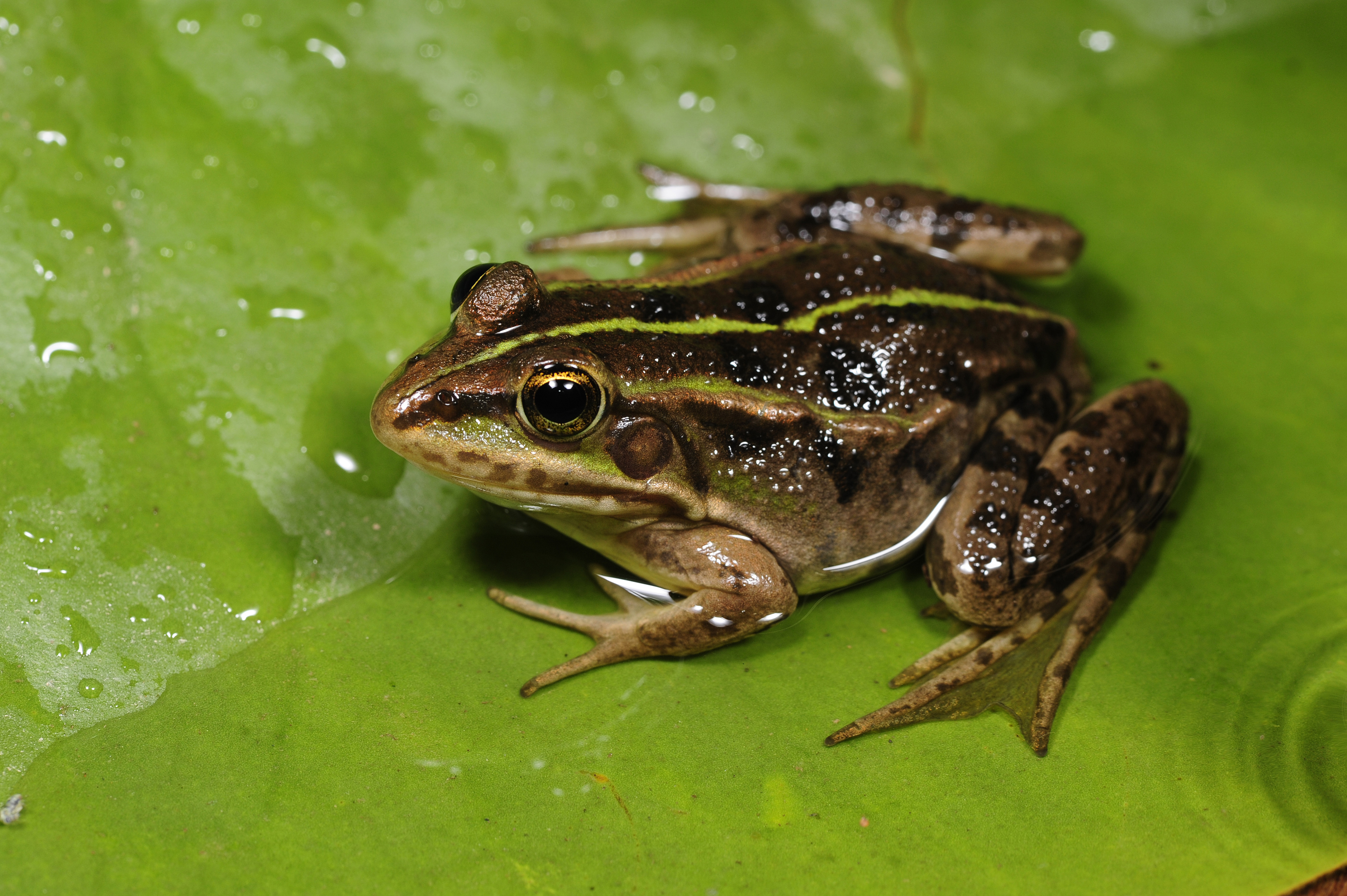

Conservation status
- Vulnerable (IUCN 3.1)

Scientific classification
- Kingdom: Animalia
- Phylum: Chordata
- Class: Amphibia
- Order: Anura
- Family: Ranidae
- Genus: Pelophylax
- Species: P. shqipericus

Binomial name
- Pelophylax shqipericus (Hotz, Uzzell, Guenther, Tunner & Heppich, 1987)

Synonyms
- List: Rana shqiperica Hotz, Uzzell, Günther, Tunner, and Heppich, 1987; Rana (Pelophylax) shqiperica (Hotz, Uzzell, Günther, Tunner, and Heppich, 1987) Dubois, 1992; Hylarana shqiperica (Hotz, Uzzell, Günther, Tunner, and Heppich, 1987) Chen, Murphy, Lathrop, Ngo, Orlov, Ho, and Somorjai, 2005

= Albanian water frog =

Species of amphibian

The Albanian water frog (Pelophylax shqipericus) is a species of true frog (family Ranidae) and is native to Albania and Montenegro. As its common name suggests, it prefers aquatic environments. The Albanian water frog is an endangered species and known populations are currently in decline. Significant threats to its habitat are presented by pollution and by drainage of wetlands, and a more direct threat is the aggressive collection of the species for commercial purposes.

The frogs are medium-sized and males sometimes bear a distinctive bright green stripe down the length of the backbone. Otherwise males are green to light brown in overall colouring with large black or dark brown spots. Females are olive green or light brown in colour and also bear brown or black large spots. As befits a species that prefers wetland habitats, the webbing on the feet extends to the tips of the toes.

== Taxonomy ==
From 30 April to 1 June 1987, zoologists Peter Beerli and Hansjürg Hotz collected several specimens of the Albanian water frog (which was unnamed at the time) in Virpazar, Lake Skadar, which at the time was part of Crna Gora, Yugoslavia (now Montenegro). These specimens were then deposited in the collections of various museums in multiple countries, including the United States, Germany, Austria, Yugoslavia and Switzerland. On 7 December that year, a study describing this species under the scientific name Rana shqiperica was published in the Proceedings of the Academy of Natural Sciences of Philadelphia. The specific epithet shqipericus comes from Shqipëria, the Albanian word for Albania. An adult male kept in the Academy of Natural Sciences, Philadelphia under the specimen number ANSP 30211 was designated as the holotype, while the other specimens were designated as paratypes. Additionally, another specimen found by Hotz in 1986 and one found by Swiss herpetologist Beat Schätti in 1981 (both from the same location as the holotype) were also listed as paratypes, and frozen tissue samples of the holotype and all paratypes were kept at the University of Illinois Urbana-Champaign.

Many species that were once included in the genus Rana were moved to separate genera at the beginning of the 21st century, when detailed molecular phylogenetic data made a distinction among the species more clear. In 1992, French zoologist Alain Dubois divided the genus Rana into 33 subgenera, with the Albanian water frog being placed in the subgenus Pelophylax under the name Rana (Pelophylax) shqiperica. A study published in 2005 further divided the species placed in the genus Rana at the time into several different genera, with those of the subgenus Pelophylax being assigned to the genus Hylarana, thus the Albanian water frog was considered to be part of this genus under the name Hylarana shqiperica. In 2006, another publication on amphibian taxonomy elevated the rank of Pelophylax from subgenus to genus, a revision which is further supported by a study published the following year, so the scientific name of the Albanian water frog was recombined once again into Pelophylax shqipericus.

There has historically been some debate among experts over whether the Albanian water frog is a distinct species from the pool frog (Pelophylax lessonae). Herpetologists Alain Dubois and Annemarie Ohler list Rana shqiperica as a valid species in a catalogue published in 1994. However, a paper published in 1996 concluded that there is no significant difference between the calls of the two supposed types of frog and thus they should be considered the same species. This synonymy would then be rejected by German herpetologist Jörg Plötner in 1998, based on the results of his genetic study which found the Albanian water frog to be a separate species from the pool frog. Plötner later published another genetic study in 2001 with his colleague Torsten Ohst which reached the same conclusion, and most authors have treated the Albanian water frog as a valid species since then. Phylogenetic analyses have revealed that the pool frog is the closest living relative of the Albanian water frog, with their last common ancestor estimated to have lived about 5.2 million years ago during the Early Pliocene. This roughly coincides with the end of the Messinian salinity crisis, an event which may have triggered the divergence of these lineages. The following cladogram shows the position of the Albanian water frog among its closest living relatives according to Dufresnes et al. (2024):

- Pelophylax Western Palearctic
  - - - - P. ridibundus marsh frogs
          ⊞Show taxa
          ⊟
          - - P. r. bedriagae
            - - P. r. kurtmuelleri
              - P. r. ridibundus
          - - cf. ridibundus lineages
              - - - P. r. persicus
                  - P. r. terentievi
                - - P. r. caralitanus
                  - - cf. ridibundus
                    - P. r. cerigensis
              - cf. ridibundus
            - P. r. cypriensis
        - P. cretensis
      - P. epeiroticus
    - pool frogs
      - P. lessonae
        - P. l. lessonae
        - P. l. bergeri
      - P. shqipericus
  - - P. perezi
    - P. saharicus

== Distribution and habitat ==
The Albanian water frog is endemic to the Balkans and primarily found only in western Albania and southern Montenegro, where it inhabits freshwater marshes, swamps, ditches, and the heavily vegetated shorelines of lakes and rivers. The northernmost part of its range is Lake Skadar, where its presence is significantly threatened by over-collection.

== Morphology ==
Male Albanian water frogs are generally about 71 mm (2.8 in) long and colouration on the dorsal side is green to light brown. They bear large brown or black spots and sometimes also have a bright green vertebral stripe. The spots disappear or are much fainter during the breeding season, and dorsal colouration changes to olive or grass green. Their vocal sacs are only lightly pigmented, greyish or green. Females are larger with a mean size of about 74 mm, are light brown to olive green, and are also dorsally spotted. On the underside, yellow colouration is present around the groin, sometimes extending to the hind legs and the belly. The belly of females is usually cream and unspotted.

Like many water frogs, P. shqipericus has entirely webbed feet, with the webbing extending to the tips of the toes.

Both males and females utter a distress call that lasts several seconds. The male advertising call does not have discrete pulse groups.

== Conservation status ==
Populations in Albania and Montenegro are diminishing due to a variety of factors. Fragmentation of its habitat is occurring as wetlands are drained for infrastructure and farming, and the quality of its remaining habitat is declining through pollution from agricultural and industrial run-off. Although Lake Skadar is a protected site on both the Albanian and Montenegrin sides and recognised as an important wetland by the Ramsar Convention, there is still a significant amount of collection of amphibians that occurs at the lake for the pet trade and the food industry. This practice reduces the population but also introduces fatal diseases, such as chytridiomycosis, and non-native frogs to the region.

Breeding and larval development of offspring rely on the aquatic nature of its habitat. It is not known how well the Albanian water frog will adapt to the threats and changes in its environment.
