= Persian marsh frog =

Scientific classification
- Kingdom: Animalia
- Phylum: Chordata
- Class: Amphibia
- Order: Anura
- Family: Ranidae
- Genus: Pelophylax
- Species: P. persicus

Binomial name
- Pelophylax persicus (Schneider, 1799)

Synonyms
- List: Rana gigas Gmelin, 1789 (preoccupied); Rana persica Schneider, 1799; Rana cachinnans Pallas, 1814 "1831"; Bufo cachinnans (Pallas, 1814 "1831") Hohenacker, 1837; Rana esculenta var. cachinnans (Pallas, 1814 "1831") Kessler, 1872

Species of amphibian

The Persian marsh frog (Pelophylax persicus) is a type of frog in the family Ranidae. Some consider it to be a species, while others believe it should be treated as a subspecies of the marsh frog, in which case its scientific name would be Pelophylax ridibundus persicus. Furthermore, the Terentjev's frog may represent the same form as it. It is found in Iran, Afghanistan, Tajikistan and Turkmenistan.

== Taxonomy ==
Illustration of two Persian marsh frogs published in 1831 and captioned as Rana cachinnans, a name which is no longer in use

The oldest scientific description of a Persian marsh frog was published in 1789, when German naturalist Johann Friedrich Gmelin established the name Rana gigas for a species of frog found in Persia (now known as Iran), but without designating a holotype or even listing what specimens he studied. However, because Rana gigas was already used in 1784 by German naturalist Johann Julius Walbaum in reference to the cane toad, this name is preoccupied and cannot be used as a valid name for the species studied by Gmelin. Therefore, German naturalist Johann Gottlob Theaenus Schneider established Rana persica in 1799 as a replacement name for this species, with the specific name referencing the location it was discovered. In a book printed in 1814 (but whose publication was delayed to 1831), German zoologist Peter Simon Pallas erected the name Rana cachinnans without listing the specimens studied for this supposed species. Baltic German polymath Karl Eichwald determined the specimens named as Rana gigas by Gmelin to be indistinguishable from those of Rana cachinnans in 1842, and thus declared the former name (and Rana persica by extension) to be a junior synonym of the latter. Rana cachinnans itself would then be synonymised in 1898 with Rana ridibunda (the scientific name used for the marsh frog at the time) by Belgian-British zoologist George Albert Boulenger, who believed that the specimens the two names were erected based on actually represent the same species.

Rana gigas, Rana persica and Rana cachinnans continued to be treated as invalid names of the marsh frog throughout the 20th Century and beginning of the 21st Century. In 1992, French zoologist Alain Dubois divided the genus Rana into 33 subgenera, with the marsh frog being placed in the subgenus Pelophylax. In 2006, another publication on amphibian taxonomy elevated the rank of Pelophylax from subgenus to genus, a revision which is further supported by a study published the following year, so the marsh frog was considered a member of the genus Pelophylax from then on. As molecular science advanced over time, it was revealed that the supposed marsh frogs in West and Central Asia exhibit notable genetic differences from the nominate form of the marsh frog found in Europe. Therefore, a paper published in 2023 suggested that the Asian frogs should be treated as a separate species. Because Rana persica is the oldest valid name used for an individual from this region, this name was resurrected as a species of Pelophylax. The valid scientific name of this frog is therefore Pelophylax persicus, and "Persian marsh frog" was proposed as its common name. In addition, the specimens which Rana gigas and Rana cachinnans were established based on actually represent the Persian marsh frog, so the paper listed the two taxa as junior synonyms of Pelophylax persicus instead of Pelophylax ridibundus. This paper also suggested that Pelophylax terentievi (commonly known as Terentjev's frog), a name which had been widely used for frogs in Central Asia, should be considered a junior synonym of Pelophylax persicus. However, this synonymy has not been accepted by all authors, and a phylogenetic study published in 2024 recovered the Persian marsh frog and Terentjev's frog as separate forms.

=== Classification ===
The Persian marsh frog is a member of Pelophylax, a genus which is widely distributed across Eurasia. More specifically, it is one of several closely related forms which greatly resemble the nominate form of the marsh frog (P. ridibundus) in appearance, which are collectively referred to as the marsh frog complex. There is much debate among herpetologists regarding whether the members of this complex should be treated as separate species or merely as subspecies of P. ridibundus. Within the complex, the closest relative of the Persian marsh frog is the Terentjev's frog (P. terentievi), and some authors treat the two as identical. The following cladogram shows the position of the marsh frog among its closest living relatives according to Dufresnes et al. (2024):

- Pelophylax Western Palearctic
  - - - - P. ridibundus marsh frogs
          ⊞Show taxa
          ⊟
          - - P. r. bedriagae
            - - P. r. kurtmuelleri
              - P. r. ridibundus
          - - cf. ridibundus lineages
              - - - P. r. persicus
                  - P. r. terentievi
                - - P. r. caralitanus
                  - - cf. ridibundus
                    - P. r. cerigensis
              - cf. ridibundus
            - P. r. cypriensis
        - P. cretensis
      - P. epeiroticus
    - pool frogs
      - P. lessonae
        - P. l. lessonae
        - P. l. bergeri
      - P. shqipericus
  - - P. perezi
    - P. saharicus
