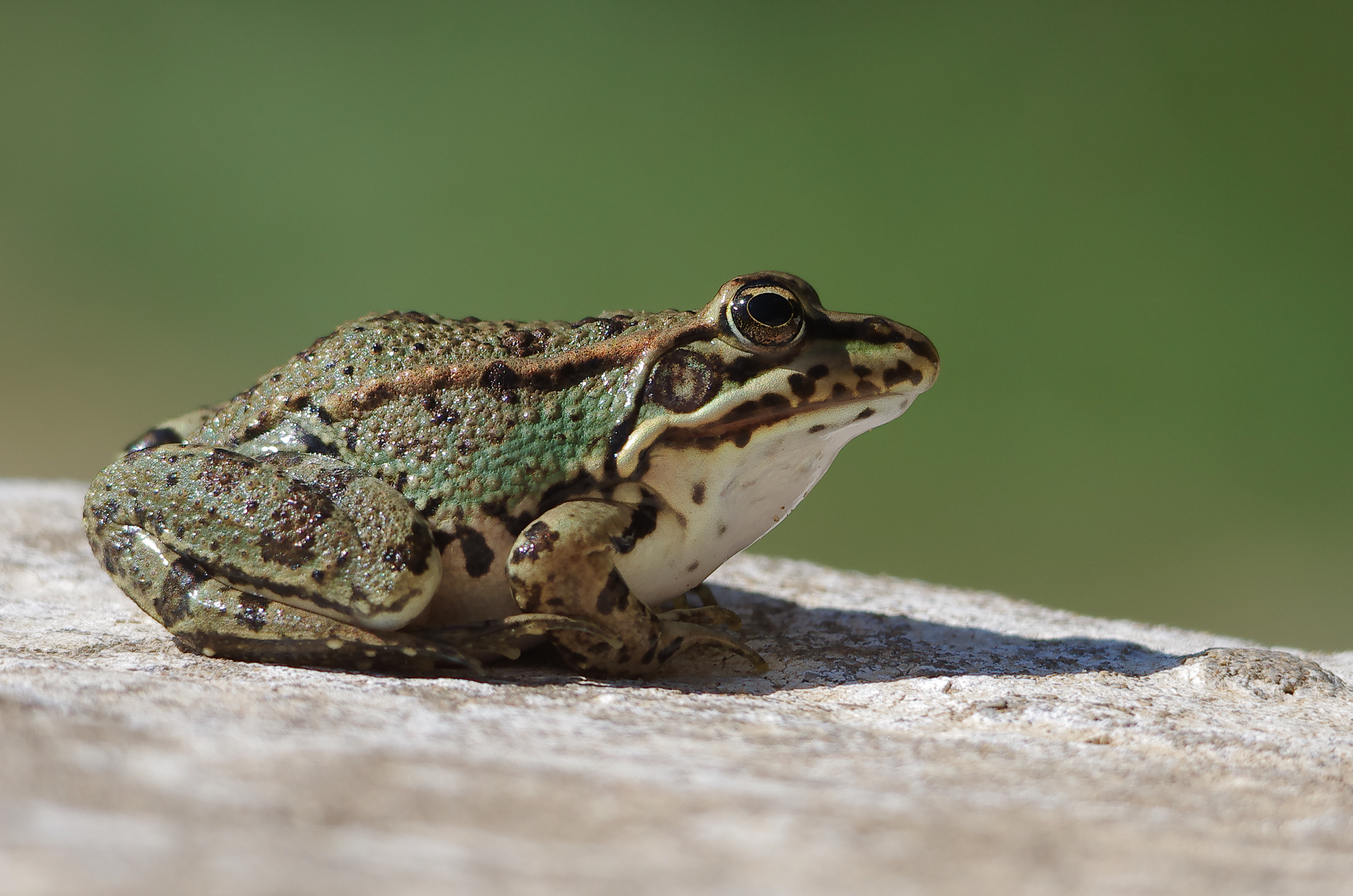
- Adult in El Haouaria, Tunisia

Conservation status
- Least Concern (IUCN 3.1)

Scientific classification
- Kingdom: Animalia
- Phylum: Chordata
- Class: Amphibia
- Order: Anura
- Family: Ranidae
- Genus: Pelophylax
- Species: P. saharicus

Binomial name
- Pelophylax saharicus (Boulenger, 1913)
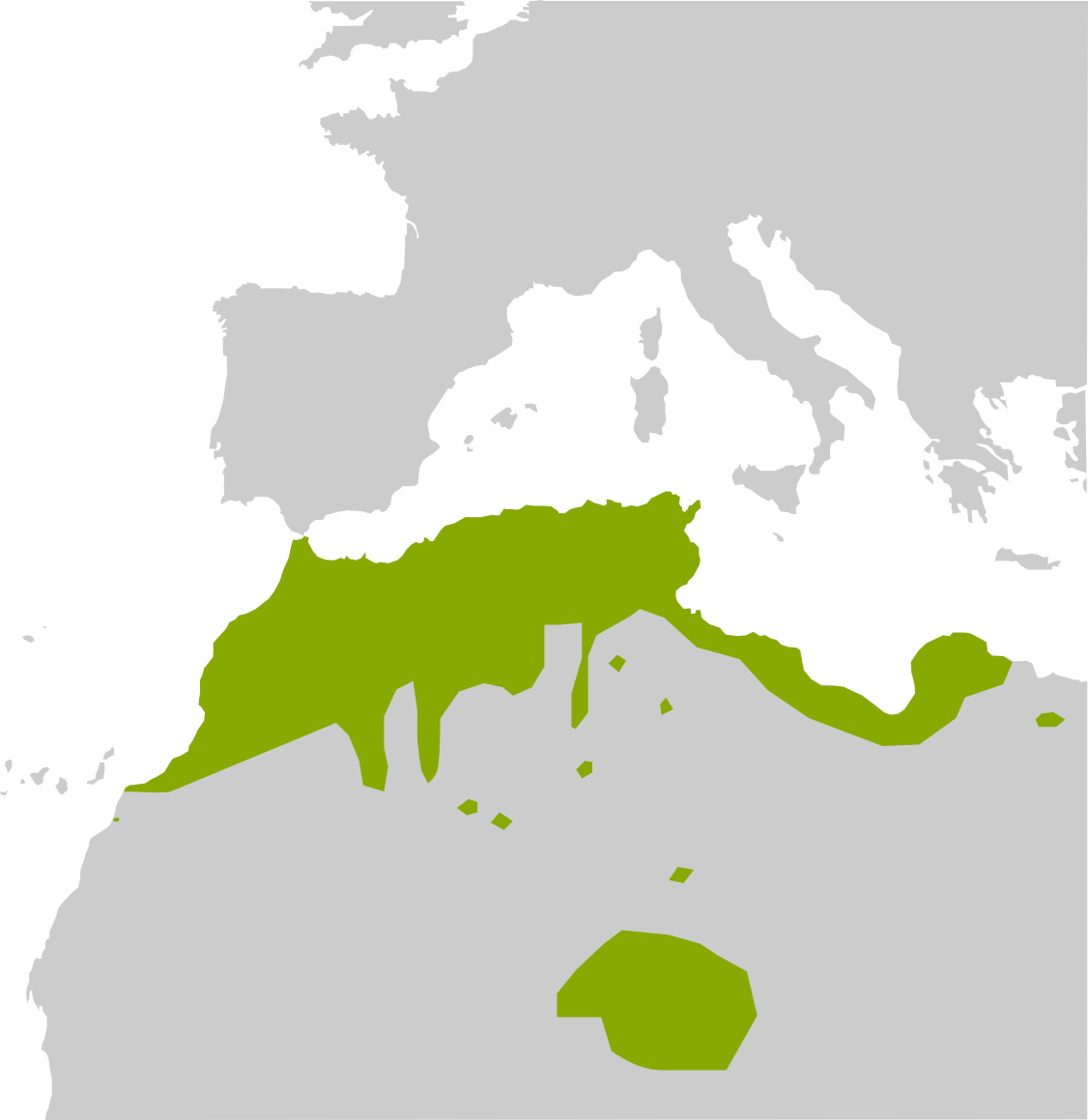

Synonyms
- List: Rana esculenta var. latastei Camerano, 1882 "1881" (preoccupied); Rana esculenta var. latastii (Camerano, 1882 "1881") Boulenger, 1883 (lapsus calami); Rana esculenta saharica Boulenger, 1913; Rana ridibunda saharica (Boulenger, 1913) Terentjev, 1927; Rana zavattarii Scortecci, 1936; Rana ridibunda riodeoroi Salvador and Peris, 1975; Rana (Rana) saharica (Boulenger, 1913) Dubois, 1987 "1986"; Rana (Pelophylax) saharica (Boulenger, 1913) Dubois, 1992; Hylarana saharica (Boulenger, 1913) Chen, Murphy, Lathrop, Ngo, Orlov, Ho, and Somorjai, 2005

= Sahara frog =

Species of amphibian

The Sahara frog (Pelophylax saharicus) is a species of frog in the family Ranidae. It is native to Egypt, Libya, Tunisia, Algeria, Morocco, Spanish North Africa (Ceuta and Melilla), and Western Sahara; it has also been introduced to Gran Canaria. In French it is called grenouille verte d'Afrique du Nord, and in Spanish it is known as rana verde norteafricana.

== Taxonomy and evolution ==
=== History of naming ===
During an expedition to the Sahara Desert in 1912, German ornithologist Ernst Hartert collected several specimens of the Sahara frog at multiple sites in Algeria, which he addressed as "the lake at El-Golea" and "the ditches of the Tidikelt oases called Igosten and In-Salah". The following year, German-British zoologist George Albert Boulenger wrote a description of these specimens for Hartert. Believing they represent a variant of the edible frog (which had the scientific name Rana esculenta at the time), he gave this amphibian the scientific name Rana esculenta saharica. In a 1927 publication, Russian zoologist Pavel Viktorovich Terentjev treated the Sahara frog as a form of the marsh frog (known as Rana ridibunda at the time) under the name Rana ridibunda saharica instead. By 1992, the Sahara frog was recognised as a separate species from other frogs and referred to as Rana saharica.

Many species that were once included in the genus Rana were moved to separate genera at the beginning of the 21st century, when detailed molecular phylogenetic data made a distinction among the species more clear. In 1992, French zoologist Alain Dubois divided the genus Rana into 33 subgenera, with the Sahara frog being placed in the subgenus Pelophylax under the name Rana (Pelophylax) saharica. A study published in 2005 further divided the species placed in the genus Rana at the time into several different genera, with those of the subgenus Pelophylax being assigned to the genus Hylarana, thus the Sahara frog was considered to be part of this genus under the name Hylarana saharica. In 2006, another publication on amphibian taxonomy elevated the rank of Pelophylax from subgenus to genus, a revision which is further supported by a study published the following year, so the scientific name of the Sahara frog was recombined once again into Pelophylax saharicus.

In addition, some Sahara frog specimens were formerly thought to represent distinct, separate forms. In 1882, Italian herpetologist Lorenzo Camerano assigned the name Rana esculenta var. latastei to the Sahara frog. Though this predates Boulenger's establishment of Rana esculenta saharica by 31 years, the name Rana latastei is preoccupied by a different species of frog that was named in 1879 and thus cannot be used for the Sahara frog. In 1936, Italian herpetologist Giuseppe Scortecci erected a species named Rana zavattarii based on several specimens found in Libya, which would then be declared a junior synonym of Rana ridibunda saharica in 1973. The specimens studied by Scortecci were claimed to be missing in 1994, but a 2014 publication reported that some were rediscovered in the Milan Natural History Museum. The name Rana ridibunda riodeoroi was established in 1975 for a type of frog found in the Western Sahara which was initially thought to be a subspecies of the marsh frog. However, it was lumped with the Sahara frog instead in 1996.

=== Evolution ===
The Sahara frog belongs to the genus Pelophylax, which is widely distributed across Eurasia, and genetic analysis has revealed that it is more closely related to the European members of this genus than to any of the east Asian species. In particular, its closest living relative is the Perez's frog (P. perezi) found on the Iberian Peninsula and in southern France. A study published in 2024 found that the lineages of these two species diverged approximately either 16 million years ago (during the end of the Burdigalian age of the Miocene) or 5.3 million years ago (during the Zanclean age of the Pliocene). The former time estimate coincides with the Betic Crisis (when sea level rise and saline lakes fragmented the Iberian Peninsula), while the latter coincides with the end of the Messinian salinity crisis (when the Mediterranean Sea dried up), suggesting that one of these events triggered the divergence of the two lineages. The following cladogram shows the position of the Sahara frog among its closest living relatives according to Dufresnes et al. (2024):

- Pelophylax Western Palearctic
  - - - - P. ridibundus marsh frogs
          ⊞Show taxa
          ⊟
          - - P. r. bedriagae
            - - P. r. kurtmuelleri
              - P. r. ridibundus
          - - cf. ridibundus lineages
              - - - P. r. persicus
                  - P. r. terentievi
                - - P. r. caralitanus
                  - - cf. ridibundus
                    - P. r. cerigensis
              - cf. ridibundus
            - P. r. cypriensis
        - P. cretensis
      - P. epeiroticus
    - pool frogs
      - P. lessonae
        - P. l. lessonae
        - P. l. bergeri
      - P. shqipericus
  - - P. perezi
    - P. saharicus

== Description ==
The Sahara frog is a large species, an exceptional female from Morocco having a snout-to-vent length of 104.5 mm (4.1 in). It is sometimes confused with Perez's frog (Pelophylax perezi), and the published description may be partially of that species. The head is as wide as it is long, the snout is oval and the eyes have horizontal pupils. Males have a pair of vocal sacs on the throat. A ridge connects the nostrils and upper eyelids and continues to the groin, separating the back from the flanks. The hind feet are webbed. The colour is variable, being reported as green, brown or mixed, sometimes with darker spots. Some frogs have a yellowish or greenish line along the spine. The legs are always spotted or barred.

== Distribution and habitat ==
The Sahara frog is native to North Africa where its range includes Western Sahara, Morocco, Algeria, Tunisia, Libya and Egypt. It is aquatic and found in and near streams, oasis pools, irrigation canals, lakes, and other water bodies.

== Status ==
The Sahara frog is abundant where a suitable wetland habitat is present. Though its population has remained steady, over-exploitation and pollution of water sources could threaten the species in the future. The International Union for Conservation of Nature has assessed its conservation status as being of "least concern".

A population was discovered in 2021 in the Etang de Berre wetland in Southern France, spreading to several localities, reproducing and present since 2011 at least, and is considered there an invasive species.
