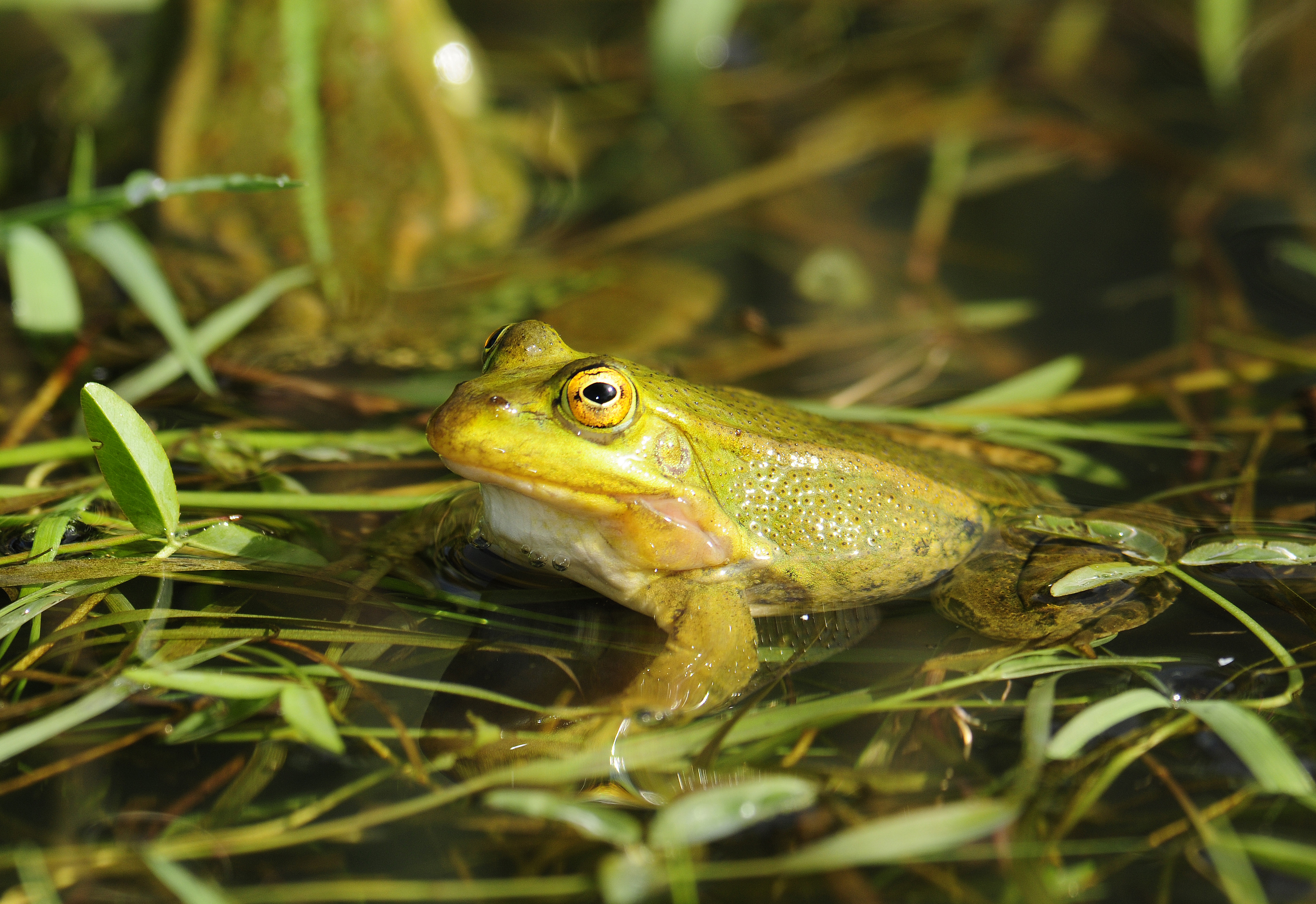

Conservation status
- Least Concern (IUCN 3.1)

Scientific classification
- Kingdom: Animalia
- Phylum: Chordata
- Class: Amphibia
- Order: Anura
- Family: Ranidae
- Genus: Pelophylax
- Species: P. lessonae
- Subspecies: P. l. bergeri

Trinomial name
- Pelophylax lessonae bergeri (Günther, in Engelmann, Fritzsche, Günther & Obst, 1986)
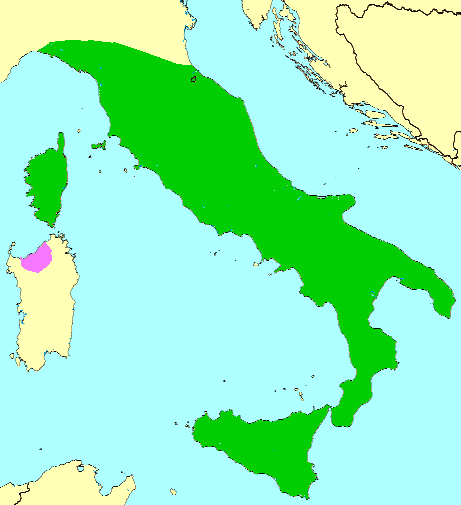

Synonyms
- Rana lessonae bergeri Günther, 1985

= Italian pool frog =

Subspecies of amphibian

The Italian pool frog (Pelophylax lessonae bergeri) is a type of frog in the family Ranidae. Though some experts have historically treated it as a distinct species, it is now usually considered a subspecies of the pool frog (Pelophylax lessonae). Found on the mainland of Italy and the Mediterranean islands of Sicily, Elba, Corsica and Sardinia, its natural habitats are rivers, swamps, freshwater lakes and freshwater marshes. It is not considered threatened by the IUCN.

== Taxonomy ==
=== History of naming ===
In 1986, German herpetologist Rainer Günther provisionally used the name Rana lessonae bergeri in a book about the amphibians and reptiles of Europe. This name was used in reference to a type of frog found in Italy (now known as the Italian pool frog) that he believed may be a subspecies of pool frog (which had the scientific name Rana lessonae at the time), and Günther included a short description and illustration of it. The subspecific name bergeri honours Polish biologist Leszek Berger, who did research on European frogs. In a paper published in 1994 and written by herpetologists Alain Dubois and Annemarie Ohler, Günther is credited as the first person to give a scientific name to this frog, as it was referred to simply as the "southern non-hybrid frog" or an unnamed species of Rana prior to this. Because Günther studied multiple specimens but did not select any as a holotype, Dubois and Ohler designated one (an adult male collected in Rome and illustrated in Günther's book) as a lectotype. However, Günther did not even mention this name in his own review of frog species published in 1990 and simply addressed the Italian pool frog as an unnamed Rana species. Additionally, he later worked alongside German zoologist Jörg Plötner in 1995 to publish a paper in which he states that he "did not intend" for his writings in the 1986 book to be the first scientific description of the frog, and that this was "clearly indicated" by the headings and taxon list in the book. A study published in 2009 concludes that while bergeri is the valid name of the Italian pool frog based on the rules of nomenclature, Günther's writings in the 1986 book do not constitute an adequate description and his illustration should not be designated as a lectotype.

Although the Italian pool frog was originally assigned to the genus Rana, its generic placement would later be changed. In 1992, Dubois divided the species assigned to Rana at the time into 33 subgenera, one of which was named Pelophylax. Though he did not assign the Italian pool frog to any subgenus at the time, he would officially place it in Pelophylax under the name Rana (Pelophylax) bergeri two years later when writing a paper together with Ohler. A study published in 2005 further divided the species placed in the genus Rana at the time into several different genera, with those of the subgenus Pelophylax being assigned to the genus Hylarana, thus the Italian pool frog was considered to be part of this genus under the name Hylarana bergeri. In 2006, another publication on amphibian taxonomy elevated the rank of Pelophylax from subgenus to genus, a revision which is further supported by a study published the following year, so the scientific name of the Italian pool frog was recombined once again into Pelophylax bergeri.

=== Classification ===
There has historically been much debate among experts over whether the Italian pool frog is a distinct species from the pool frog (Pelophylax lessonae) or merely a subspecies of it. If it is indeed distinct, its scientific name would be Pelophylax bergeri, but when treated as a subspecies it would instead be Pelophylax lessonae bergeri. A paper published in 1996 tentatively assigned species status to the Italian pool frog based on differences in their calls from those of "typical" pool frogs. However, a 2004 study using electrophoretic data instead determined that the two types of frog exhibit very little divergence and should thus be considered the same species. A phylogenetic study published in 2008 further supported this. Since then, authors in Europe have widely accepted the Italian pool frog to be a subspecies in the same species as "typical" pool frogs, which are classified as a different subspecies called the European pool frog (Pelophylax lessonae lessonae). A study published in 2024 confirmed that Italian pool frogs and European pool frogs are each other's closest living relatives, supporting the idea that they are subspecies of the same species, and suggests that they split from each other about 2.7 million years ago during the Late Pliocene. The following cladogram shows the position of the Italian pool frog among its closest living relatives according to Dufresnes et al. (2024):

- Pelophylax Western Palearctic
  - - - - P. ridibundus marsh frogs
          ⊞Show taxa
          ⊟
          - - P. r. bedriagae
            - - P. r. kurtmuelleri
              - P. r. ridibundus
          - - cf. ridibundus lineages
              - - - P. r. persicus
                  - P. r. terentievi
                - - P. r. caralitanus
                  - - cf. ridibundus
                    - P. r. cerigensis
              - cf. ridibundus
            - P. r. cypriensis
        - P. cretensis
      - P. epeiroticus
    - pool frogs
      - P. lessonae
        - P. l. lessonae
        - P. l. bergeri
      - P. shqipericus
  - - P. perezi
    - P. saharicus

In addition, individuals from Sicily and Calabria have been suggested to represent a third pool frog subspecies which is currently unnamed and closely related to the Italian pool frog. A genetic study published in 2024 found that the Sicilian frogs are more closely related to one another than to frogs on the Italian mainland, but still considered them to be part of the bergeri subspecies.

== Description ==
The Italian pool frog grows to a snout-to-vent length of about 8 cm (3.1 in) and has a pointed snout and triangular-shaped head. The tongue is notched and it has vomerine teeth in the roof of its mouth. The skin is smooth and not warty. The colour is variable and depends on the animal's location, but is usually some shade of green with black spots, but may be reddish-brown or grey. There is a pale stripe running along the centre of the back. The underparts are greyish-white marked with dark blotches and the hind legs have dark stripes. Males have a pair of external vocal sacs on either side of the mouth which are only visible when the animal is calling. The voice is a series of guttural croaks each lasting up to one and a half seconds.

== Distribution and habitat ==
The Italian pool frog is native to the mainland of Italy, south of Rimini and Genoa, and to the islands of Sicily, Elba and Corsica. It has been introduced into Sardinia. Its typical habitat is sluggish streams and rivers, lakes and swamps and their environs, and it is present at altitudes of 1,800 metres (5,900 ft) or more. It has been introduced into the United Kingdom but whether it persists there is unclear.

== Status ==
The main threat to the Italian pool frog is the draining of its aquatic habitats; as a result of this, the population appears to be declining at a slow rate. However, the frog has a wide range, is common in many places and has a large total population, so the International Union for Conservation of Nature has assessed it as being of "least concern".

== See also ==
- Hybridogenesis in water frogs
