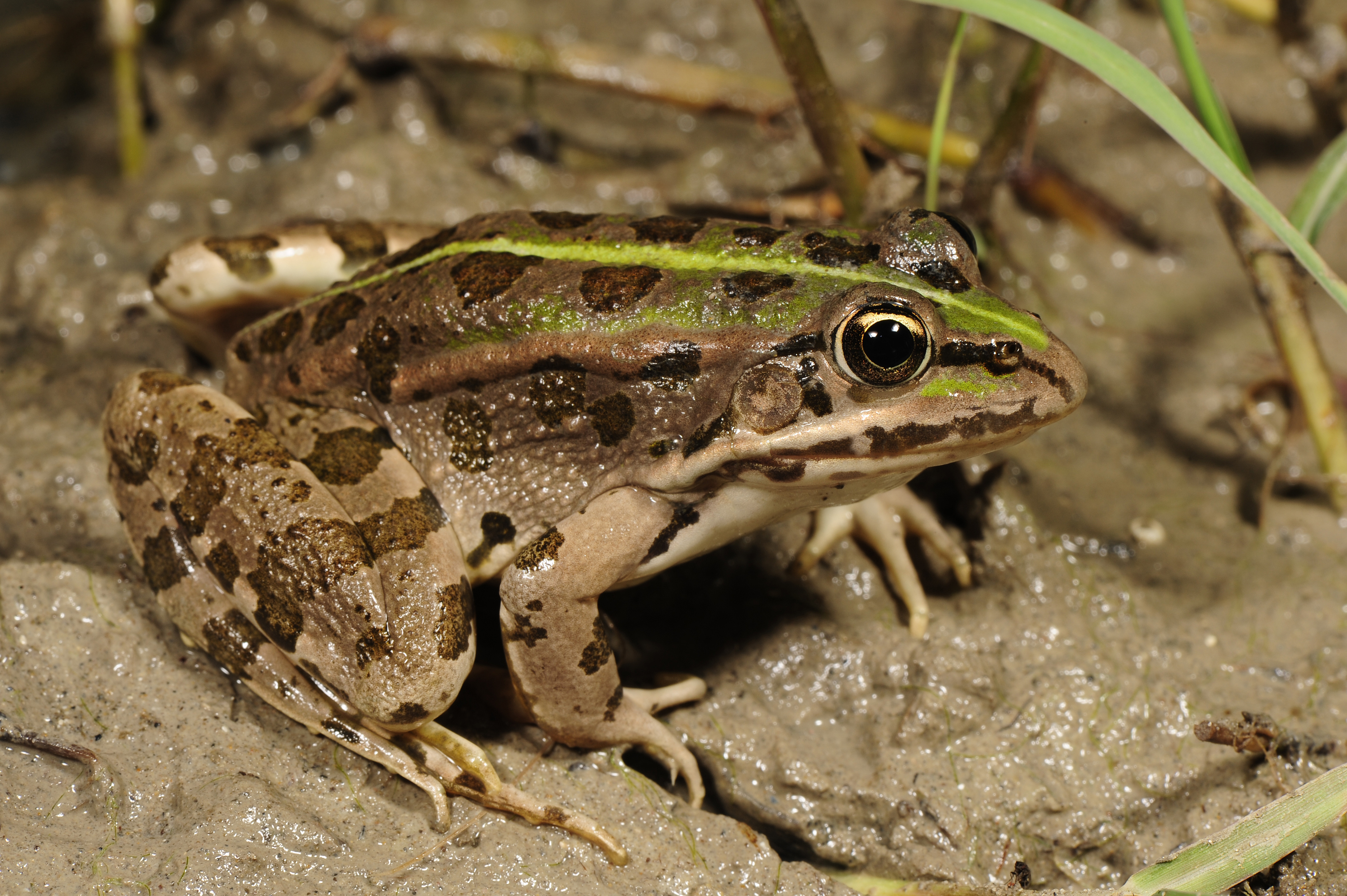
- Adult in Peloponnesus, Greece

Conservation status
- Near Threatened (IUCN 3.1)

Scientific classification
- Kingdom: Animalia
- Phylum: Chordata
- Class: Amphibia
- Order: Anura
- Family: Ranidae
- Genus: Pelophylax
- Species: P. epeiroticus

Binomial name
- Pelophylax epeiroticus (Schneider, Sofianidou & Kyriakopoulou-Sklavounou, 1984)
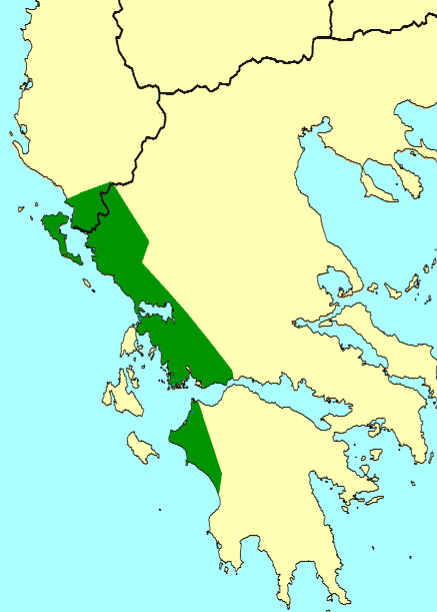

Synonyms
- List: Rana epeirotica Schneider, Sofianidou & Kyriakopoulou-Sklavounou, 1984; Rana (Pelophylax) epeirotica (Schneider, Sofianidou & Kyriakopoulou-Sklavounou, 1984) Dubois, 1992; Hylarana epeirotica (Schneider, Sofianidou & Kyriakopoulou-Sklavounou, 1984) Chen, Murphy, Lathrop, Ngo, Orlov, Ho, and Somorjai, 2005

= Epirus water frog =

Species of amphibian

The Epirus water frog (Pelophylax epeiroticus) is a species of frog in the family Ranidae. It is found in western Greece, including Kerkyra, and the southern areas of Albania. The species is collected from the wild for human consumption.

== Taxonomy and evolution ==
The Epirus water frog was first realised to be a distinct species from other frogs in 1984, when scientists recording the calls of frogs in Lake Pamvotida, Greece discovered that some of the calls did not match any previously known species. They then collected and studied several specimens, which verified that it was indeed a new species. The scientific name Rana epeirotica was given to this species, with the specific name referencing the Epirus region where the lake is located. The collected specimens were deposited in the Museum Koenig Bonn, and an adult male with the specimen number ZMFK 41679 was designated as the holotype, while ten other specimens were listed as paratypes.

Many species that were once included in the genus Rana were moved to separate genera at the beginning of the 21st century, when detailed molecular phylogenetic data made a distinction among the species more clear. In 1992, French zoologist Alain Dubois divided the genus Rana into 33 subgenera, with the Epirus water frog being placed in the subgenus Pelophylax under the name Rana (Pelophylax) epeirotica. A study published in 2005 further divided the species placed in the genus Rana at the time into several different genera, with those of the subgenus Pelophylax being assigned to the genus Hylarana, thus the Epirus water frog was considered to be part of this genus under the name Hylarana epeirotica. In 2006, another publication on amphibian taxonomy elevated the rank of Pelophylax from subgenus to genus, a revision which is further supported by a study published the following year, so the scientific name of the Epirus water frog was recombined once again into Pelophylax epeiroticus.

Phylogenetic analysis has revealed that the closest living relatives of the Epirus water frog are the Cretan frog (P. cretensis) and members of the marsh frog (P. ridibundus) complex, the latter representing either a single species with multiple subspecies or a species complex of multiple separate species. It has been estimated that the lineage of the Epirus water frog diverged from that of these related forms about 8.3 million years ago during the Tortonian age of the Late Miocene. This timing coincides with the formation of the mid-Aegean trench that split Anatolia from southeast Europe, an event which may have reproductively isolated the ancestors of the Epirus water frog from those of the Cretan and marsh frogs, triggering this divergence. The following cladogram shows the position of the Epirus water frog among its closest living relatives according to Dufresnes et al. (2024):

- Pelophylax Western Palearctic
  - - - - P. ridibundus marsh frogs
          ⊞Show taxa
          ⊟
          - - P. r. bedriagae
            - - P. r. kurtmuelleri
              - P. r. ridibundus
          - - cf. ridibundus lineages
              - - - P. r. persicus
                  - P. r. terentievi
                - - P. r. caralitanus
                  - - cf. ridibundus
                    - P. r. cerigensis
              - cf. ridibundus
            - P. r. cypriensis
        - P. cretensis
      - P. epeiroticus
    - pool frogs
      - P. lessonae
        - P. l. lessonae
        - P. l. bergeri
      - P. shqipericus
  - - P. perezi
    - P. saharicus

== Description ==
Like most frogs, Epirus water frogs show sexual dimorphism. Males can grow to 2.9 inches (74 mm) in length, with females growing larger to 3.3 inches (84 mm). The dorsal side is typically green with irregular black spots. The underside is pale. Male vocal sacs are olive aside from mating season, when they can turn a dark gray.

== Distribution and habitat ==
The species occurs in Mediterranean-type shrubby vegetation, rivers, swamps, freshwater lakes and marshes, and plantations. It is threatened by habitat loss, and is classified as vulnerable as populations within its relatively small range are fragmented.

== Reproductive behavior ==
The spawning period extends from the end of April to the beginning of May and can change by a few days depending on the latitude and altitude of a population and the local weather. In the case of high reproductive activity, calling begins in the morning at around 9 a.m. and lasts until midnight or longer with a longer break at dusk, during which the frogs are catching insects. Calling Epirus water frogs have been observed at water temperatures between 13 and 24.5 °Celsius.

== Mating call ==
The calls consist of very short pulses with intervals in between, which is why the calls sound creaky. According to the calculated equations, the calls last for 616 milliseconds at a water temperature of 15 °Celsius and consist of 32 pulses. As the temperature rises, the duration of the calls decreases, while the number of pulses per call increases. The frequency spectrum has a strong component between 1400 and 2400 Hertz. The males mostly give the calls in series.
