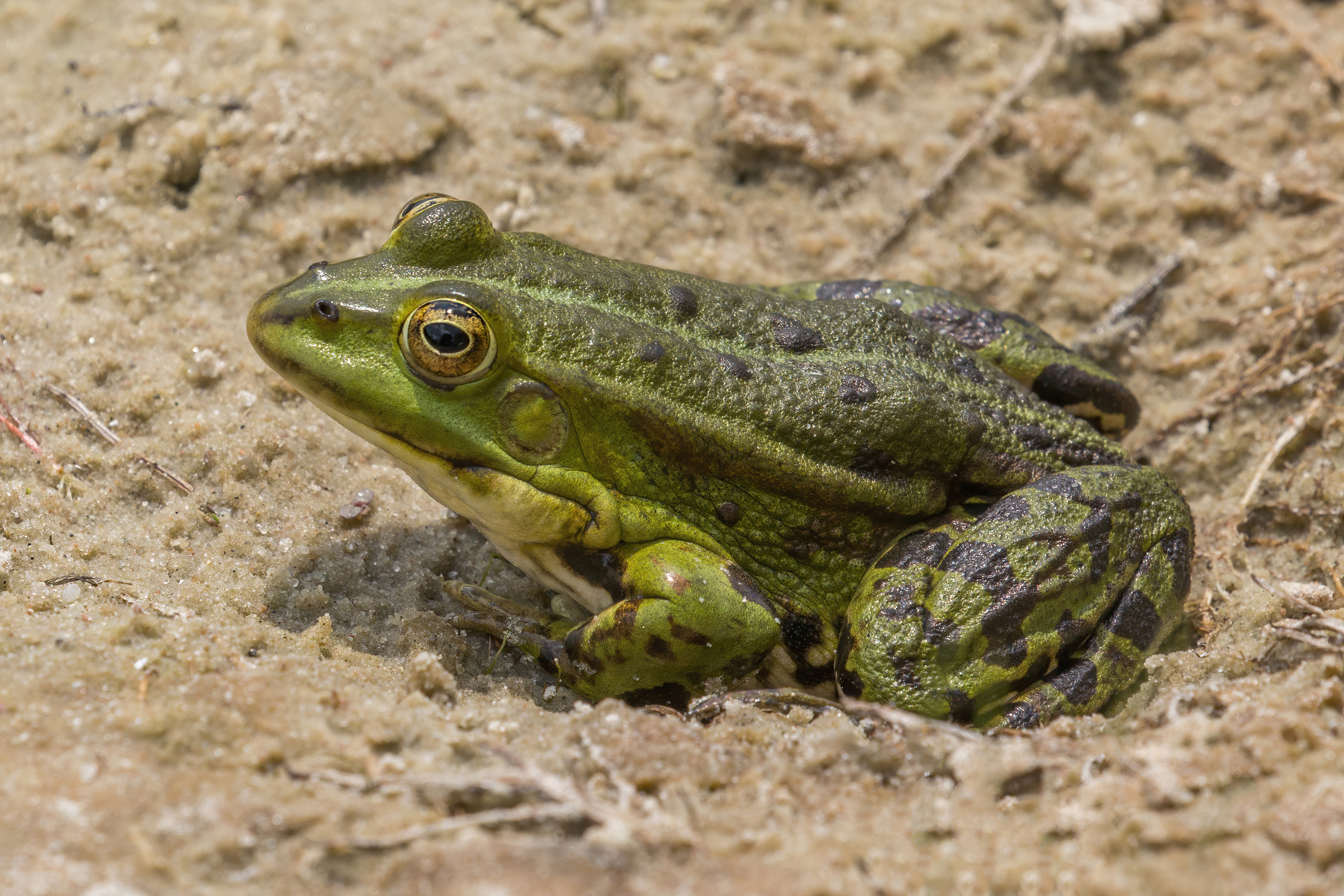
- Young adult, Poland

Conservation status
- Least Concern (IUCN 3.1)

Scientific classification
- Kingdom: Animalia
- Phylum: Chordata
- Class: Amphibia
- Order: Anura
- Family: Ranidae
- Genus: Pelophylax
- Species: P. ridibundus

Binomial name
- Pelophylax ridibundus (Pallas, 1771)

Subspecies
- See text
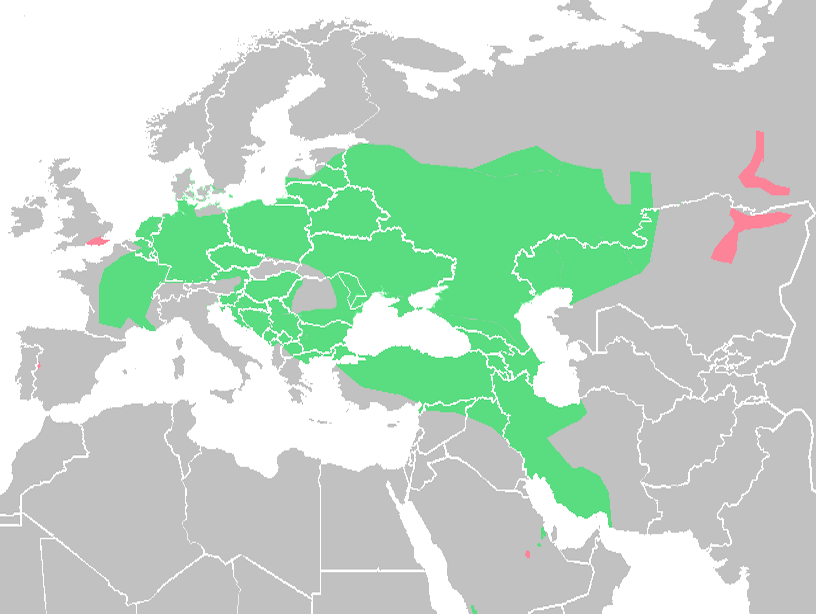
- Distribution

Synonyms
- List: Rana ridibunda Pallas, 1771; Bufo ridibunda (Pallas, 1771) Bonnaterre, 1789; Rana caucasica Pallas, 1814 "1831"; Rana bufoides Pallas, 1814 "1831"; Bufo caucasicus (Pallas, 1814 "1831") Eichwald, 1831; Rana dentex Krynicki, 1837; Rana taurica Bonaparte, 1840; Rana esculenta var. ridibunda (Pallas, 1771) Boettger, 1880; Rana fortis Boulenger, 1884; Rana (Baliopygus) ridibunda (Pallas, 1771) Schulze, 1891; Rana florinskii Kashchenko and Sipacev, 1913, Rana mangischlakensis Ahl, 1925; Rana (Rana) ridibunda (Pallas, 1771) Dubois, 1986; Rana (Pelophylax) ridibunda (Pallas, 1771) Dubois, 1992; Hylarana ridibunda (Pallas, 1771) Chen, Murphy, Lathrop, Ngo, Orlov, Ho, and Somorjai, 2005

Audio

= Marsh frog =

Marsh frog Temporal range: Early Pliocene - recent, 5.3–0 Ma
- Mature adult, Turkey

Species of frog

The marsh frog (Pelophylax ridibundus) is a species of frog in the family Ranidae. It is native to continental Europe and parts of western Asia, where it inhabits bodies of water from puddles and ponds to lakes and rivers, and even brackish coastal environments, as well as their surrounding areas. Closely related to the pool frog and Perez's frog, the marsh frog can interbreed with these species to produce fertile hybrids called the edible frog and Graf's hybrid frog respectively, which maintain their populations by breeding with one of their parental species. Though the marsh frog is very similar to these related forms in appearance, it can be distinguished from them based on vocal sac color, snout shape, leg length, the shape of a hardened lump on the foot, the extent of the foot webbing and various skeletal features.

Reaching up to 15 cm (5.9 in) in length, the marsh frog is often the largest frog species present in areas where it occurs. Mainly active during the day (though nocturnal activity has also been observed), the adult marsh frog is a generalist predator which mostly feeds on invertebrates, but will also eat rodents, reptiles, fish, young birds, and smaller frogs including others of its own species. However, it begins life as a mostly herbivorous tadpole, only eating animal matter later in life when metamorphosis has begun. Breeding typically occurs in late spring or early summer, when males use vocalisations to ward other males off and attract females. During the winter, marsh frogs usually hibernate underwater. The exact timing of breeding and hibernation varies depending on the temperature. Marsh frogs of all life stages are eaten by predators such as large fish, snakes, otters and mink, and are parasitised by various organisms including parasitic worms, protozoans, and fungi.

The meat of the marsh frog is edible; humans have both collected wild marsh frogs and farmed them in captivity for use as a food source. Marsh frogs have been traded internationally for this purpose, as well as other reasons such as education, research, the pet trade, and ornamental use. Such frogs are sometimes released or escape from captivity, and because this generalist species is highly adaptable in diet and habitat choice, they easily become established in new environments. Introduced populations have thus been established in many countries across Europe and Asia outside of its native range, where it is considered an invasive species because it preys on and competes with animals native to a region. Measures to control its spread and eradicate it from its non-native range are needed to prevent further ecological damage. In parts of its native range, the marsh frog itself is threatened by pollution and overharvesting, but its overall population remains high and faces little risk of extinction.

== Taxonomy and evolution ==
=== History of naming ===
The first scientific description of the marsh frog was published in 1771 and written by Prussian zoologist Peter Simon Pallas, who gave it the scientific name Rana ridibunda after collecting specimens of it during an expedition through the Russian Empire. Pallas did not precisely specify the type locality (where he found the frogs), only noting it as "versus mare Caspium; Volgae et Iaico" (opposite to the Caspian Sea, Volga, and on the Yaik River). A more precise location of "Gurjew" on the north coast of the Caspian Sea (now the city of Atyrau in Kazakhstan) was given in a 1928 publication written by German herpetologists Robert Mertens and Lorenz Müller. However, a 1994 paper by herpetologists Alain Dubois and Annemarie Ohler noted that because Pallas never designated a holotype specimen, a neotype needs to be selected for the species. The restriction of the type locality done by Mertens and Müller is therefore invalid unless a specimen from Atyrau is designated as the neotype, which Dubois and Ohler suggest should be done.

Illustration of two marsh frogs published in 1898 by George Albert Boulenger and captioned as Rana esculenta var. ridibunda

Though Pallas initially considered the marsh frog to be a species in the genus Rana, later authors would move it into other genera or treat it as a variant of other species. French naturalist Pierre Joseph Bonnaterre was the first to do so, moving it into Bufo under the name Bufo ridibundus in an encyclopedia published in 1789, and the same classification was used in a book written by German naturalist Johann Gottlob Theaenus Schneider in 1799. The species would later be moved back into Rana but treated as a variant of the edible frog (which formerly had the scientific name Rana esculenta), with Belgian-British zoologist George Albert Boulenger addressing it as Rana esculenta var. ridibunda in works published in 1885 and 1898. The marsh frog would be listed as a species separate from other frogs again in 1891, when German herpetologist Erwin Schulze established a subgenus of Rana called Baliopygus and listed the marsh frog as a species of it, thus naming it Rana (Baliopygus) ridibunda.

In a 1986 paper, Alain Dubois stated that frogs of the edible frog species group should be moved into the subgenus Rana, which means the scientific name of the marsh frog would be Rana (Rana) ridibunda. However, Dubois would later divide Rana into 33 subgenera and place this species in the subgenus Pelophylax under the name Rana (Pelophylax) ridibunda. A study published in 2005 further divided the species placed in the genus Rana at the time into several different genera, with those of the subgenus Pelophylax being assigned to the genus Hylarana, thus the marsh frog was considered to be part of this genus under the name Hylarana ridibunda. In 2006, another publication on amphibian taxonomy elevated the rank of Pelophylax from subgenus to genus, a revision which is further supported by a study published the following year, so the scientific name of the marsh frog was recombined once again into Pelophylax ridibundus.

==== Obsolete names ====
In addition, some marsh frog specimens were formerly thought to represent distinct, separate forms. They have since been found to represent the same species and the taxa erected based on them are thus considered synonymous. German naturalist Johann Friedrich Gmelin established the name Rana gigas in 1789 for a species of frog found in Persia (now known as Iran), but without designating a holotype or even listing what specimens he studied. In a book printed in 1814 (but whose publication was delayed to 1831), Pallas would erect the names Rana cachinnans and Rana caucasica without listing the specimens studied for any of these supposed species. Additionally, he states that his description of R. caucasica is copied from manuscript notes written by Baltic German explorer Johann Anton Güldenstädt, who referred to it as Rana bufoides instead. Because Güldenstädt's notes were never formally published and the two names refer to the same specimens, R. bufoides is objectively a junior synonym of R. caucasica. Baltic German polymath Karl Eichwald declared R. gigas to be a junior synonym of R. cachinnans in 1842, which itself and R. caucasica were synonymised with R. ridibunda by George Albert Boulenger in 1898. A study published in 2023 suggested that the specimens which Rana gigas and Rana cachinnans were established based on actually represent the Persian marsh frog, and thus considered the two taxa to be junior synonyms of Pelophylax persicus instead of Pelophylax ridibundus.

Illustration published in 1837 of one of the specimens that Johann Krynicki established Rana dentex based on

In 1837, Russian zoologist Johann Krynicki erected the species Rana dentex based on multiple specimens found along the Podkumok River in Russia, of which two still exist but were noted to be in "bad condition" in 2009. This species would then be lumped with Rana ridibunda by Boulenger in 1898. The name Rana taurica was first published as a synonym of the Rana esculenta (the edible frog) by French biologist Charles Lucien Bonaparte in 1840, who read the name on a label in the Wien Museum, though a 1994 publication considered it to represent the marsh frog instead. Boulenger established the species Rana fortis in 1884 based on his study of German specimens, but would synonymize it with Rana ridibunda the following year. The species Rana florinskii and Rana mangischlakensis were erected in 1913 and 1925 respectively, the former based on specimens from Tomsk, Russia and the latter based on ones from Mangyshlak, Kazakhstan, but both were synonymized with Rana ridibunda in 1994.

=== Subspecies ===
There is much debate among herpetologists regarding how many subspecies the marsh frog has. Several similar types of frogs have been named and described as separate species, with proponents for their validity considering them to form a species complex. However, some argue that they should be treated as subspecies of Pelophylax ridibundus instead. A phylogenetic study published in 2024 recovered the following subspecies:

Subspecies	Trinomial authority	Description	Range
Eurasian marsh frog (P. r. ridibundus) (Nominate subspecies)	(Pallas, 1771)	Large frog with highly variable colouration, rough skin, paired vocal sacs and a low, asymmetrical hardened lump on the underside of each foot.	Most of Europe
Levant water frog (P. r. bedriagae)	(Camerano, 1882)	Very similar in anatomy to the Eurasian marsh frog, distinguished primarily by its call.	Levant region of West Asia and Egypt
Beyşehir frog (P. r. caralitanus)	(Arikan, 1988)	Similar to the Eurasian marsh frog and Levant water frog, but is larger and has an orange underside.	Turkish Lakes region, southern Anatolia
Karpathos frog (P. r. cerigensis)	(Beerli, Hotz, Tunner, Heppich & Uzzell, 1994)	Small brown or olive frog. Compared to related forms, the tibia is long and the hardened lump on the foot is shorter.	Karpathos and Rhodes, Greece
Cyprus water frog (P. r. cypriensis)	Plötner, Baier, Akn, Mazepa, Schreiber, Beerli, Litvinchuk, Bilgin, Borkin, and Uzzell, 2012	Similar to the Levant water frog, but with nostrils spaced further apart, a broader head, larger hardened lump on the foot and different mating call.	Cyprus
Balkan frog (P. r. kurtmuelleri)	(Gayda, 1940)	Very similar in anatomy to the Eurasian marsh frog, distinguished primarily by its call.	Native to the Balkans, introduced to parts of western Europe (including France, Switzerland, Denmark and Italy)
Persian marsh frog (P. r. persicus)	(Schneider, 1799)	Very similar in appearance to the Levant water frog, but larger and genetically distinct.	Iran, Afghanistan, Tajikistan and Turkmenistan
Terentjev's frog (P. r. terentievi)	(Mezhzherin, 1992)	Very similar in anatomy to the Eurasian marsh frog, distinguished primarily by genetic analysis.	Tajikistan and Afghanistan

=== Evolution ===
The marsh frog is a member of Pelophylax, a genus which is widely distributed across Eurasia. Many forms (which may be either subspecies or separate species) related to the nominate form of the marsh frog are known from across Europe and west Asia, with the most closely related being the Balkan frog (P. kurtmuelleri), which are collectively referred to as the marsh frog complex. This complex has been estimated to have already evolved about 3.5 million years ago during the Late Pliocene, with the last common ancestor of all its members living at around that time. The closest living relative of the marsh frog complex as a whole is the Cretan frog (P. cretensis), and these two lineages have been suggested to have diverged about 5.2 million years ago during the Early Pliocene. This roughly coincides with the end of the Messinian salinity crisis, an event which may have triggered the divergence. The following cladogram shows the position of the marsh frog among its closest living relatives according to Dufresnes et al. (2024):

- Pelophylax Western Palearctic
  - - - - P. ridibundus marsh frogs
          ⊞Show taxa
          ⊟
          - - P. r. bedriagae
            - - P. r. kurtmuelleri
              - P. r. ridibundus
          - - cf. ridibundus lineages
              - - - P. r. persicus
                  - P. r. terentievi
                - - P. r. caralitanus
                  - - cf. ridibundus
                    - P. r. cerigensis
              - cf. ridibundus
            - P. r. cypriensis
        - P. cretensis
      - P. epeiroticus
    - pool frogs
      - P. lessonae
        - P. l. lessonae
        - P. l. bergeri
      - P. shqipericus
  - - P. perezi
    - P. saharicus

Fossilised remains indicate that frogs of the genus Pelophylax were already widespread across Europe during the Early Oligocene, as specimens dating back to this period have been found in France, Germany and Romania, suggesting that the ancestors of the marsh frog arrived to the continent over 33.9 million years ago. In particular, a complete skeleton (with the specimen number MAB19654) from the Early Oligocene-aged site of Marnes du Bois d’Asson, France has been noted to closely resemble the marsh frog, though it has not been formally assigned to any species. The oldest fossils attributed to the modern marsh frog species itself originate from Nurnus, Armenia and date back to the Early Pliocene. These have been reported under the name Pelophylax cf. ridibundus and suggest that the species already existed between 5.3 and 3.6 million years ago, with additional fossils reported under this name having been found at other Pliocene and Pleistocene-aged sites in Armenia.

== Description ==
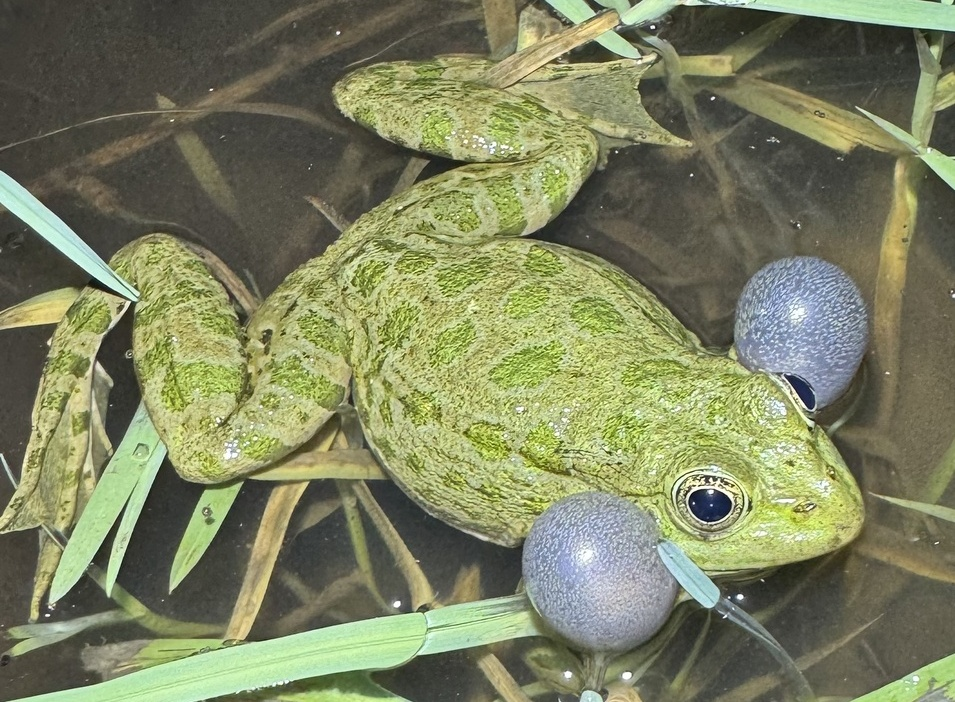
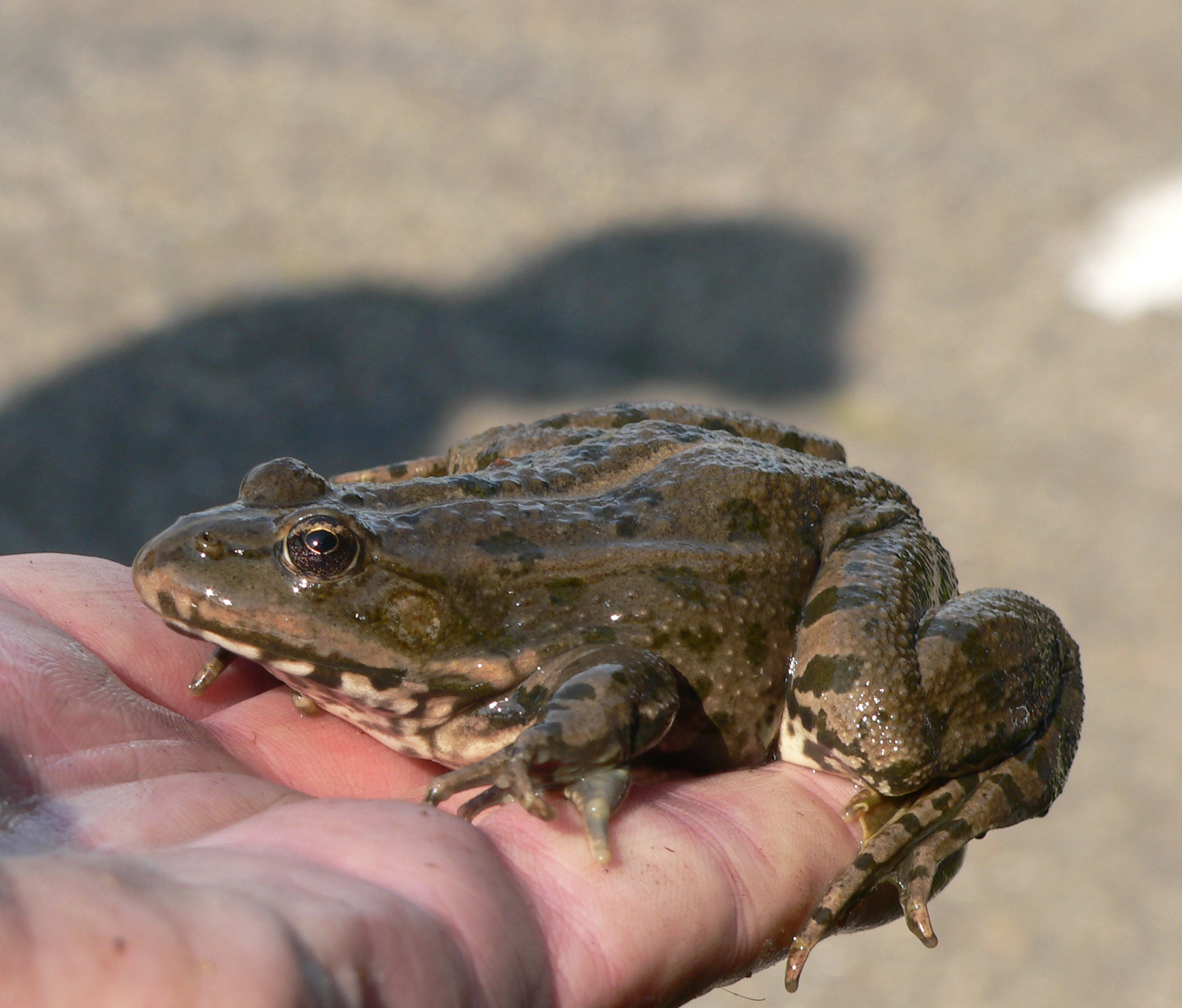
Individuals showing the range of colour variation in the marsh frog

The marsh frog is the largest type of frog in most of its range, capable of reaching a snout–vent length of up to 15 cm (5.9 in). Females typically grow slightly larger than males, and anthropogenic activity can also affect the size of individuals in a population; for example, commercial harvesting likely caused average body sizes in a Turkish population to decrease between 1999 and 2008. The skin of a marsh frog is relatively rough as it bears warts and ridges, and forms distinctive folds on the sides of its back. There is a large variation in colour and pattern, ranging from dark green or even black to lighter green, brown or grey, often with a bright green line running down the back. Dark roundish or square patterns are typically present (but sometimes absent) on the back and sides, which may be dense or scant, and the legs usually have barred patterning of a similar colour. The arms and legs can be partly brown, while the thighs and underside are usually white or cream, but may also be yellow or green. Dense black or grey spots are typically present on the underside of the lower body. Adult males have a pair of vocal sacs, one under each tympanum, which are often folded internally but inflate and become visible during vocalisation. These sacs are usually dark grey or black, a feature often distinguishing the marsh frog from the edible frog (which has lighter grey vocal sacs) and the pool frog (which has white vocal sacs). However, the vocal sacs of some marsh frogs are known to be exceptionally pale.

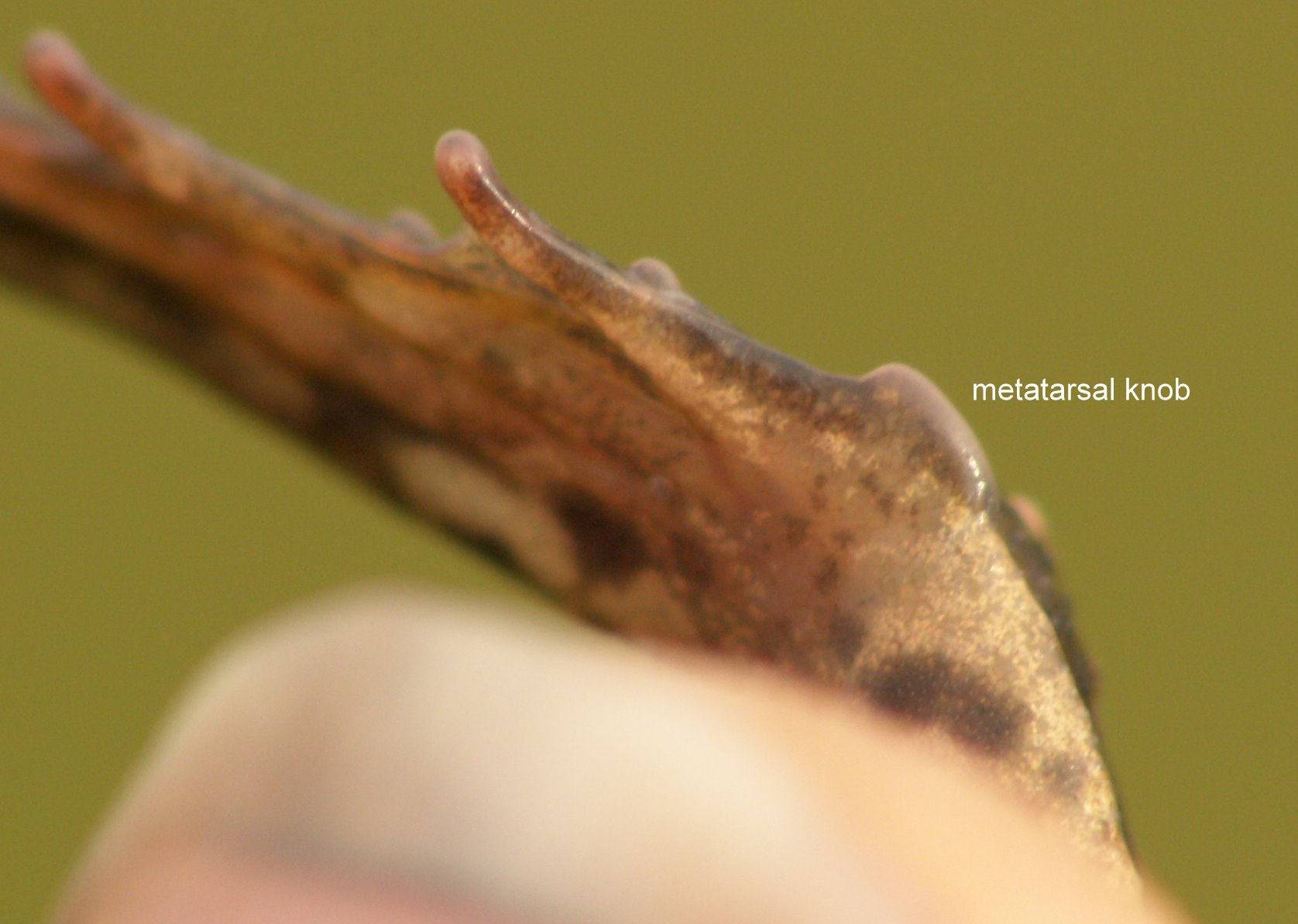
The shape of the metatarsal tubercle on the foot is an important feature for distinguishing marsh frogs from related species

The snout of a marsh frog is long and has a sharp tip, differing from some related species it lives alongside (namely the edible, pool and Epirus water frogs) which have shorter, blunter snouts. The marsh frog also has long hind legs, with the heel joint often reaching past the snout when the leg is pulled forwards along the body; in contrast, the heel of the edible frog tends to only just reach the snout when the leg is pulled that way, and those of the pool frog and Epirus water frog reach only the eye. Each foot bears a hardened lump called the metatarsal tubercle, which is low and asymmetrical, with the highest point near the toe and its height decreasing towards the leg. As revealed in a study published in 2020, the size and shape of this tubercle is the most reliable and important feature for distinguishing marsh frogs from edible or pool frogs; this tubercle is higher in the latter two species, and while that of an edible frog is similarly asymmetrical, a pool frog's metatarsal tubercle instead has a symmetrical shape resembling a semi-circle. Marsh frogs have webbed feet, and the webbing extends to the tip of the fourth toe. This feature distinguishes them from the Perez's frog and Graf's hybrid frog, in which the webbing does not reach that toe tip, though it nearly does in the latter.

Illustration of the skeleton of a female marsh frog

Some of a marsh frog's bones are distinguishable from those of other frog species, with the most diagnostic being skull bones called the frontoparietals. These are formed by fusing the frontal and parietal bones, and European Pelophylax species have ridges on their frontoparietals that start from a projection at the hind part of the bone (near where the skull connects to the vertebrae). Each species has a distinctly different ridge formation, with the marsh frog having very pronounced ridges that form sharp bulges, such that a tooth-like formation named the "dens frontoparietalis ridibundae" is present at the hind part of the bone. Furthermore, the frontoparietal bones themselves are very robust in a marsh frog. In contrast, the corresponding bones in a pool frog have a slender build with ridges reduced to a slight bulge, and those of the edible frog are intermediate between those of marsh frogs and pool frogs. In addition, the ilium (part of the hip bone) is also usable for identification; that of a marsh frog has a flattened tubercle on the front part, whereas this tubercle protrudes much further outward in a pool frog. However, because edible frogs show a wide range of gradual variation intermediate between pool and marsh frogs, identifying a single ilium to species level is impossible. Instead, a larger sample of over five ilia could be used to determine whether a population of frogs consists purely of pool or marsh frogs, or if edible frogs are also present. All three species have ilia which are notably thicker in the part where the ilium is joined to the ischium (another part of the hip bone), which distinguishes them from those of frogs in the genus Rana.

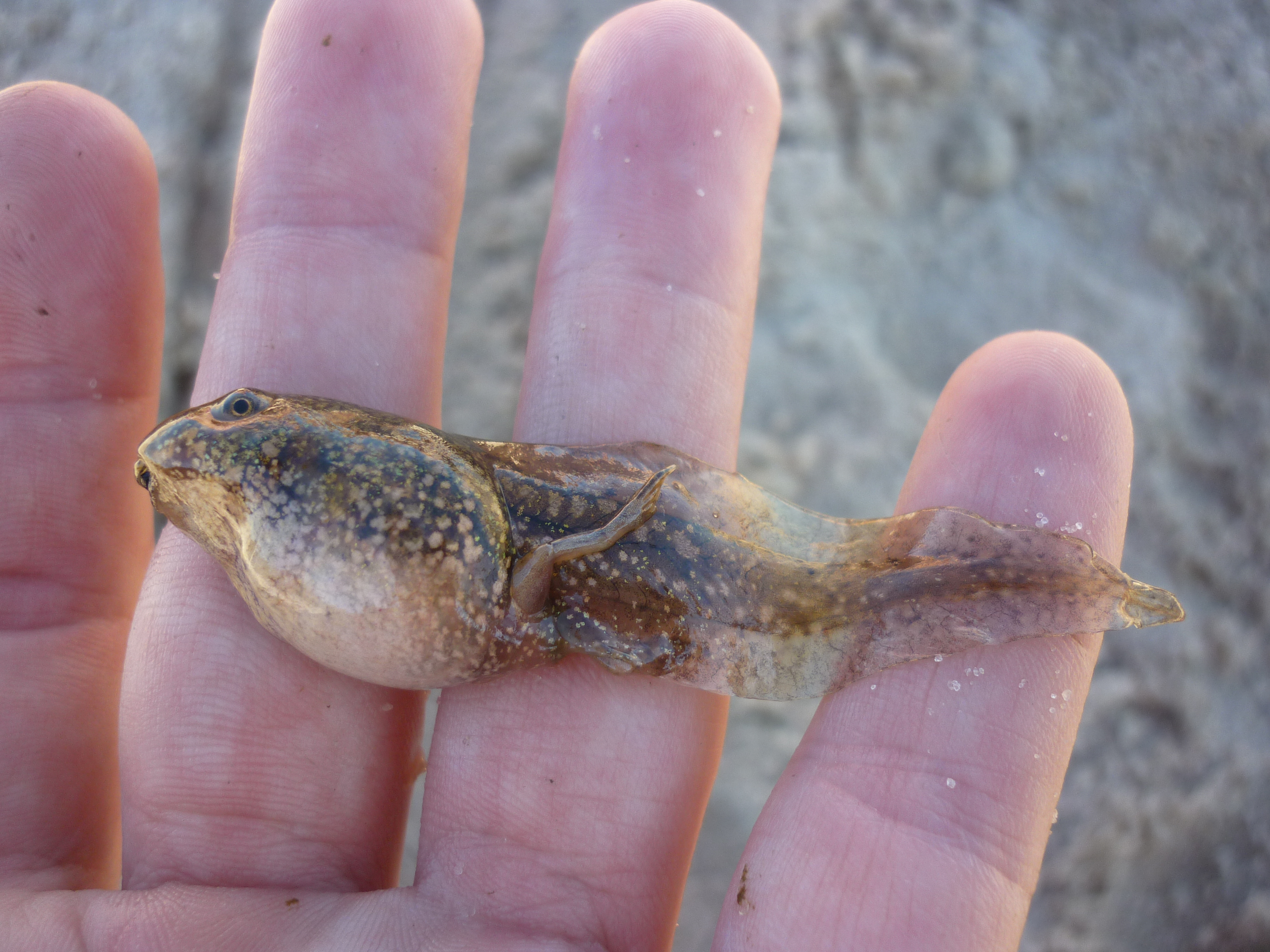
Tadpole of a marsh frog

The tadpole of the marsh frog is brown or olive in colour, becoming greener as it gets older, and its tail tip is pointed. A single respiratory opening called a spiracle is present on the left side of the body and is diagonally pointed upwards, while the cloaca is on the right side. Overall, a marsh frog tadpole is similar in anatomy to that of a pool frog, but may grow far larger; the former can exceed 15 cm (5.9 in) in length, whereas the latter typically measures only 4–8 cm (1.6–3.1 in).

== Distribution and habitat ==
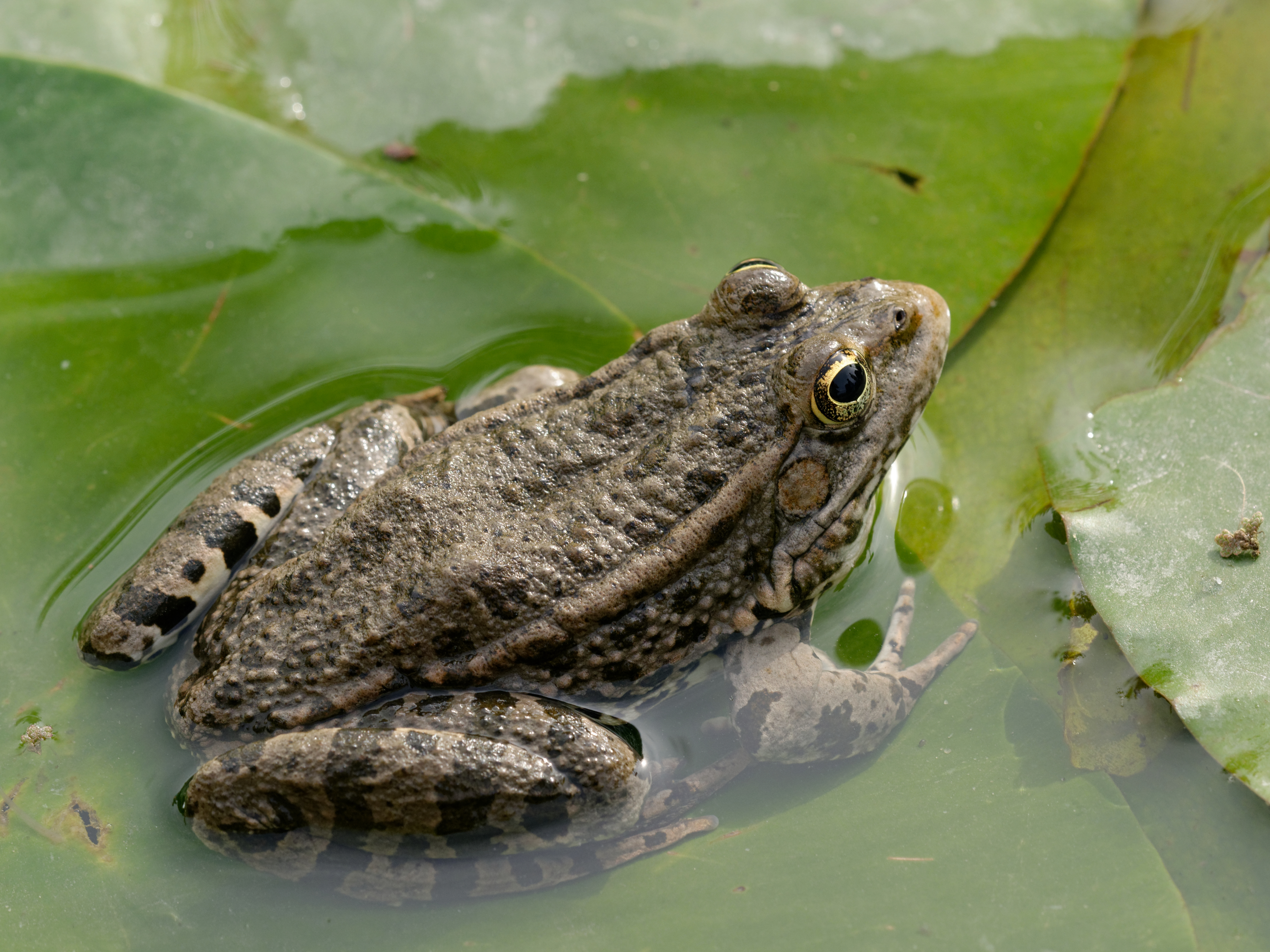
On an European white water lily pad in Jardin des Plantes, Paris, France

A widespread animal, the marsh frog occurs in large parts of Europe and is also present in Asia as far east as Kazakhstan, Iran and Afghanistan. Additionally, an isolated relict population is present in southern Hadhramaut, Saudi Arabia. Reports of marsh frogs in China and Iraq are now believed to represent the Terentjev's frog and Levant water frog respectively, which may be subspecies of the marsh frog, though some consider them to be separate species instead. Though present in much of Europe, being native to the central, eastern and southeastern parts, it is notably absent from Scandinavia. It is known to have been introduced to many areas outside of its native range, though the extent of its native range is not entirely certain; for example, it remains unclear if it is native to parts of western Europe such as France, or whether isolated colonies in Bahrain were introduced. Known introduced populations are present in Switzerland, Belgium, Spain, Sardinia, the Kamchatka Peninsula in Far Eastern Russia, the United Kingdom and the Al-Kharj region of Saudi Arabia.

The marsh frog typically inhabits large bodies of water such as deep ponds and active rivers, but is highly adaptable and can occur in a wide range of environments. Individuals are more closely tied to the aforementioned habitat types in areas where the pool frog is also present (a form of niche partitioning via habitat selection), and young frogs are particularly versatile in habitat choice. Both stagnant and flowing bodies of water, ranging from small puddles to large lakes, are known to host marsh frogs, especially if they are warm and have plenty of herbaceous vegetation. Even areas modified by human activity such as fish ponds can serve as suitable habitat, and such activity can even make an area more favourable; introduced populations in Kamchatka survive thanks to electric power stations discharging warm water into reservoirs. Marsh frogs inhabit water bodies in many types types of habitat up to an altitude of 2,500 m (8,200 ft), including forests, grasslands, steppes and even deserts, colonising dry areas via river channels and valleys. Individuals have also been found in caves in the Greater Caucasus, though the species is only rarely found in this habitat. Unusually for an amphibian, the marsh frog is tolerant of saltwater, having been reported inhabiting and even breeding in brackish pools along the shores of the Caspian Sea and Black Sea.

== Behaviour and biology ==
=== Hibernation ===
Marsh frogs generally hibernate during the winter, as the low temperatures and reduced food availability force them to do so in order to conserve energy. The typical hibernation period is from October to February but varies based on regional climate; frogs in Greece (a warmer area to the south of their range) often only begin hibernation in late November, with subadults beginning even later and sometimes still active on sunny December days. Some populations in Romania do not hibernate at all, as the presence of thermal water allows them to remain active throughout the year. Hibernation usually occurs underwater, typically within mud at the bottom of water bodies, though holes in river banks may also be used.

The weight of a marsh frog's liver increases prior to hibernation as the frog actively feeds to reach the metabolic requirements to survive the winter, and decreases during hibernation as liver glycogen is used, reaching a minimum weight soon after hibernation ends. Body fat is also used as an energy source during dormancy, so the mass of fat bodies and the lipid content of body tissues both decrease during hibernation. Marsh frogs are tolerant of the low temperatures they face during hibernation, capable of surviving even if they are frozen for over 24 hours, but die if more than 58% of their body's water content becomes ice. However, this species has no cryoprotective system, unlike the related pool frog and edible frog whose blood lactate, blood glucose, liver glucose and liver alanine levels increase in response to freezing temperatures. As a result, marsh frogs accumulate ice at a higher rate than these two relatives. Prolactin concentration in the frog's skin increases during hibernation, allowing the skin to thicken in response to low temperatures and prevent water loss from the body, as well as regulating the function of the granular glands.

When temperatures increase and the frog arouses from hibernation, its metabolism and rate of oxygen consumption increase. This causes an increase in oxidative stress, so the level of antioxidant enzymes in its organs and muscles also elevates as a form of defence against this. This antioxidative defence system therefore shows the highest response in spring, and is not significantly affected by the amount of heavy metals accumulated in the frog's body, as evidenced by how frogs from polluted and unpolluted areas show the same seasonal fluctuations in antioxidant levels. In addition, the levels of certain proteins also increases when the frog recovers from hibernation, providing the stamina needed to become active again.

=== Reproduction and development ===
Marsh frogs typically breed during late spring or early summer, but may do so throughout the year if conditions are suitable. The breeding period depends on various abiotic factors such as precipitation and temperature, and generally begins only when the water temperature exceeds 18 °C (64 °F). Breeding occurs in ponds or flooded land within a few hundred meters of their hibernation sites, and the frogs of both sexes are able to use the magnetic field of the Earth to locate breeding sites, arriving at about the same time (in contrast to some other amphibians in which one sex arrives at breeding sites before the other). Records have revealed that the breeding period of at least some populations now begins earlier in the year than before, likely due to global warming; a phenological study on frogs in Saratov Oblast, Russia revealed that while the date of the beginning of spawning migrations was relatively stable from 1892 to 1960, this date then shifted earlier by five days from 1961 to 2020. By 2025, this process accelerated suddenly and the date shifted earlier by an extra ten days.

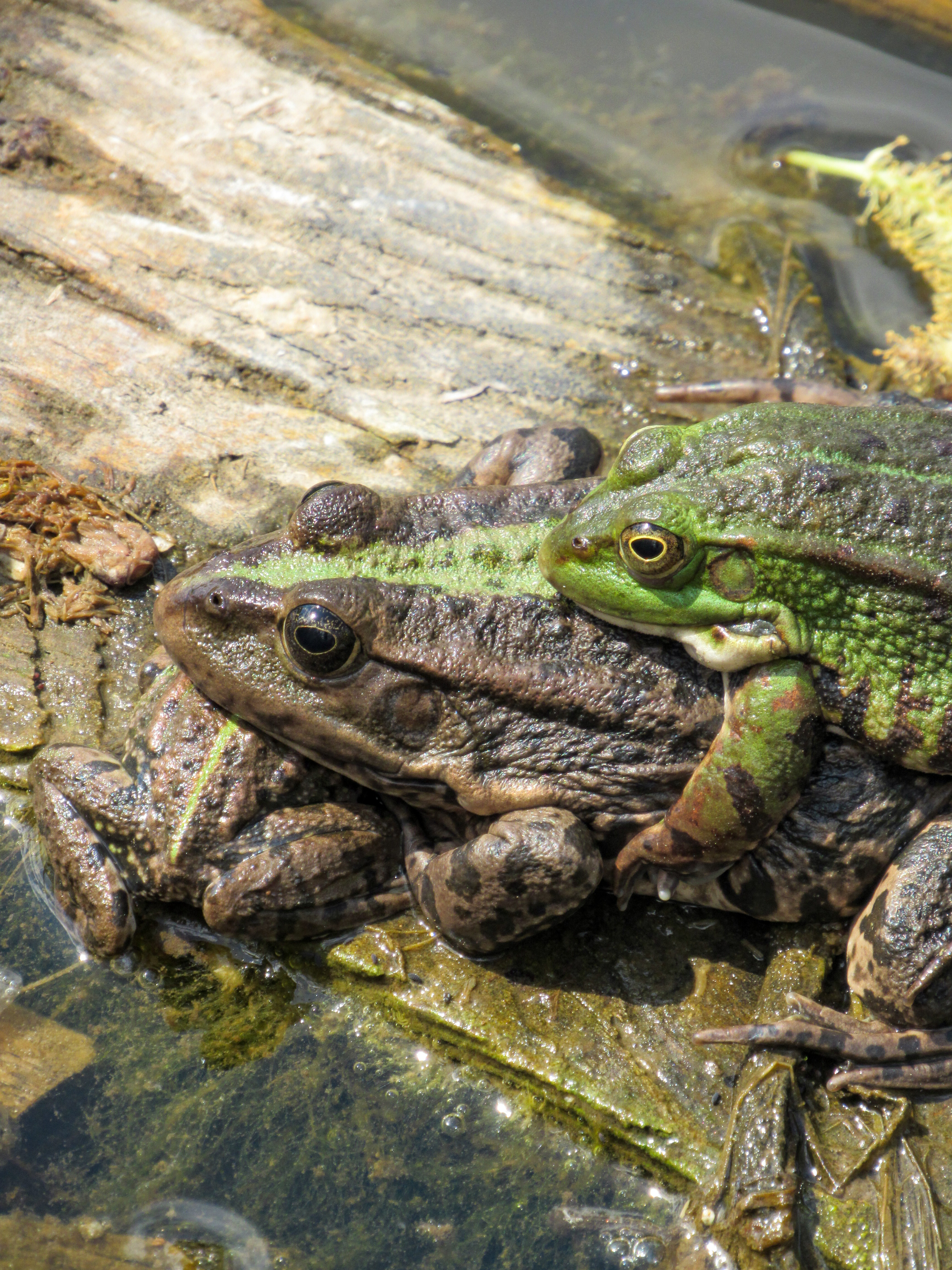
Mating pair in amplexus found in Kharkiv, Ukraine

During the breeding season, adult male marsh frogs produce mating calls to attract females. When one approaches, the male uses his forelimbs to grasp onto the area behind her forelimbs, a behaviour known as amplexus which continues while the female lays her eggs. Male frogs generally breed with females that are larger than themselves, with a study conducted in Turkey finding that 37 of the 40 amplexed pairs observed involved a male smaller than the female he was grasping onto. Because the breeding period of the marsh frog overlaps with that of some other amphibians, interspecific amplexus sometimes occurs, with this Turkish study noting that a male European green toad was seen amplexed onto a female marsh frog. The eggs of the marsh frog are laid in several clumps and fixed to underwater plants at the shallow edges of the breeding ponds, with each clump having between 144 and 645 eggs. A female may lay eggs two to seven times in one breeding season, resulting in as many as 16,400 eggs laid. However, the average number is far lower, with one study calculating a mean fecundity of 3853 eggs. Each individual egg measures about 1.73 mm (0.068 in).

Marsh frog eggs are laid in several clumps in ponds

Embryos of the marsh frog develop quickly, capable of hatching as aquatic tadpoles just 2 to 4 days after the eggs are laid, though the timing varies depending on temperature. The rate of metamorphosis is similarly affected by temperature and thus varies between different populations; one study found that wild tadpoles in the Turkish provinces of Adana and Mersin can complete metamorphosis in 45 to 65 days, whereas those in Anatolia require a much longer duration of 90 to 120 days. Light also affects tadpole development, with experiments revealing that compared to those in normal lighting, tadpoles reared under red light are smaller while those under blue light show increased growth. Blue light also leads to faster development, whereas total darkness slows it. Newly metamorphosed juveniles measuring 20–25 mm (0.79–0.98 in) emerge onto land over the course of the summer, but can grow to 26–47 mm (1.0–1.9 in) after their first hibernation.

==== Hybridogenesis ====
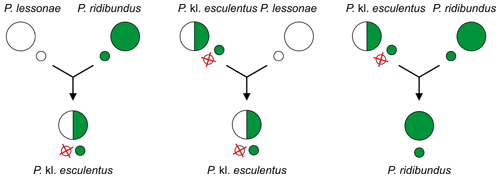
Example crosses between the marsh frog (P. ridibundus), the pool frog (P. lessonae) and their hybrid, the edible frog (P. kl. esculentus). The first is the primary hybridisation generating the hybrid; the second is the most widespread type of hybridogenesis.

Marsh frogs are capable of interbreeding with related species of frogs to produce hybrid offspring. When crossbred with some of these species, the resulting hybrids are fertile, yet their gametes (eggs or sperm) include only DNA from one parental species (usually the marsh frog) while excluding the DNA of the other parental species. These hybrids therefore maintain their populations by backcrossing (mating with the parental species whose genes are excluded), a mode of reproduction known as hybridogenesis, and organism which require input from a different species to reproduce (such as these hybrids) are known as kleptons.

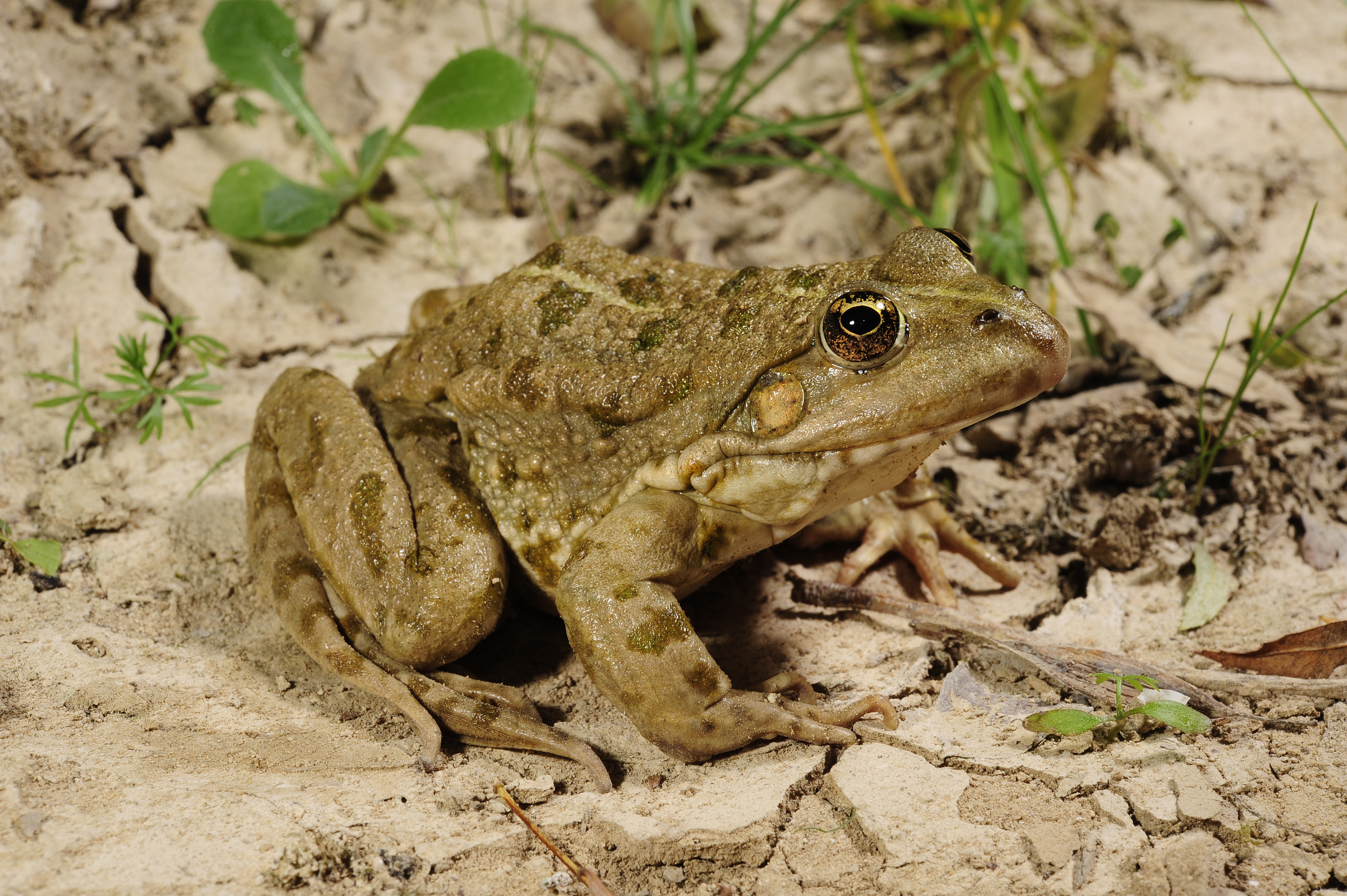
The edible frog (top) and Graf's hybrid frog (bottom) are hybrid forms with marsh frog genes

The most well-known hybridogenetic hybrid of the marsh frog is the edible frog (Pelophylax kl. esculentus), which originated from hybridisation between the Eurasian marsh frog (P. ridibundus ridibundus) and the European pool frog (P. lessonae lessonae). Most edible frogs produce gametes that only have marsh frog genes, so their populations are maintained by backcrossing with pool frogs. Another klepton that has marsh frog genes is the Graf's hybrid frog (Pelophylax kl. grafi), which also has genes from the Perez's frog (P. perezi) and produces gametes that contain only marsh frog genes, maintaining its population by backcrossing with Perez's frogs. However, it is unclear if the Graf's hybrid frog first appeared from the interbreeding of Perez's frogs and marsh frogs, or that of Perez's frogs with edible frogs that transmitted the marsh frog genome. The Italian edible frog (Pelophylax kl. hispanicus) is another klepton, one which backcrosses with the Italian pool frog (P. lessonae bergeri), and its other parental species was formerly believed to be the marsh frog. However, genetic analysis has revealed that the other parental species of the Italian edible frog is actually an otherwise unknown frog species whose "pure" form is currently extinct and was related to the marsh frog.

In addition, marsh frogs can also produce hybrids with the Epirus water frog (P. epeiroticus), Balkan frog (P. kurtmuelleri) or Albanian water frog (P. shqipericus). Hybrids with the Epirus water frog have been found in Lake Pamvotida, Greece, and can be distinguished from their parent species based on their calls, body proportions and colouration. Hybridisation between marsh frogs and Balkan frogs was first revealed in 2017 via genetic testing of wild individuals in Poland, and more such hybrids were later reported from a fish pond in Crna Mlaka, Croatia. These hybrids are believed to be non-hybridogenetic. In contrast, hybrids between marsh frogs and Albanian water frogs were originally discovered through mating experiments, and not known to exist in the wild until they were found at the aforementioned Crna Mlaka fish pond in 2011. Given that these hybrids are relatively abundant in the pond, they could represent a hybridogenetic form that is currently undescribed.

=== Vocalisations ===
Adult males calling in a pond in Bulgaria

Male marsh frogs produce loud calls and have a pair of vocal sacs which inflate when they are vocalising. Their mating calls, which they produce to attract females, have been described as metallic squeaking sounds produced in fast series, with each individual note being clearly spaced. The territorial calls, used by males to warn off other males, are short and squeaking. Calls produced by marsh frogs show a great range in variation, and certain environmental factors contribute to these differences. For example, each mating call consists of a sequence of pulse groups, and though the number of pulses per group is unaffected by temperature, the frogs produce calls in which the pulses are more distinct if the water they are in is cooler. Additionally, marsh frogs in areas with more noise pollution produce calls with lower amplitude, frequency and energy than those in quieter sites do.

== Ecology ==
=== Diet ===
Eating a fish in Ukraine

The marsh frog is a largely diurnal animal, active primarily during the day, though individuals living in smaller bodies of water may be more active at night. The adult frog is predatory and has been observed hunting during both day and night. It feeds mainly on land, with a study conducted in Croatia finding that 60% of prey taken is terrestrial, but also takes greater amounts of aquatic prey than the related edible frog and pool frog do. An ambush predator, the marsh frog commonly remains still as it waits for prey to move within reach, at which point it captures and ingests the prey animal. This frog has also been observed climbing onto water buffalo to eat the flies attracted to these large mammals, hinting at a possible mutualistic relationship. There is no significant difference between the diets of each sex, as male and female frogs forage in the same areas. However, minor intersexual dietary differences have been observed during the breeding season, with females taking a slightly wider range of prey at this time. Various factors such as temperatures and rainfall affect the feeding rate; in particular, a study on a population in Romania which does not hibernate found that feeding is reduced in winter due to the cold, as well as in autumn due to drought.

The diet of the marsh frog is mostly made up of invertebrates, with arthropods making up 90.1 to 97.3% of its diet; the exact value varies between different regions and populations, as does the types of arthropods predominantly fed on. This frog does not selectively hunt specific prey but is instead an opportunist, so its diet shifts seasonally and is often dominated by the most easily available invertebrates in the area. Adult forms of invertebrates are eaten primarily, likely as they are more active. However, some populations eat large amounts of insect larvae (such as one from Serbia in which caterpillars of geometer moths make up over half the diet). Vertebrate prey is also taken, with the most common being smaller frogs (including individuals of its own species), rodents such as voles, and small fish. Fledgling birds, lizards and snakes have also been recorded as prey items. In this aspect, the diet of the marsh frog differs from that of the pool frog, which rarely feeds on vertebrates. This may be because the marsh frog is larger and can thus eat larger animals than a pool frog can. Plant matter is sometimes found in the stomach contents of marsh frogs, albeit in small amounts, with a Serbian study finding that it only makes up 2.39% of the stomach content volume in the individuals sampled. This is likely ingested unintentionally when the frog eats an animal, but may provide some nutrition considering that it appears partly digested.

Tadpoles feeding on algae in Belgorod Oblast, Russia

As tadpoles, these amphibians are more omnivorous, leaning more towards herbivory than carnivory, and eat a wide range of organic matter including algae, detritus, plants, invertebrates, and dead animals. Before metamorphosis begins, the diet of the tadpoles consists almost entirely of algae and detritus. Plant matter remains the main food source when the tadpole develops one pair of limbs, but small amounts of animal matter are also taken at this stage. By the time two pairs of limbs have developed, a larger amount of animal matter is eaten. Foraging primarily occurs at the bottom of bodies of water, with benthic items making up most of a tadpole's diet.

==== Cannibalism ====
Marsh frogs regularly exhibit cannibalism, with many studies on their diet finding individuals to have eaten another of their own species. This behaviour is linked to factors such as resource availability and population density, so is believed to be more common in areas of lower habitat quality such as polluted regions. Increasing populations and decreasing levels of other prey available may also cause populations to display higher rates of cannibalism over time. Cannibalism is done mostly by adult frogs, and the individuals eaten are usually small and post-metamorphic, with the size difference between predator and prey being a main factor in determining predation. Additionally, eggs and tadpoles are also regularly cannibalised. In an exceptional case, an adult marsh frog was seen trying to swallow another adult of almost the same size in Bulgaria. Though the attacker ultimately failed to consume the victim, severe damage had been inflicted on the victim's spinal column, and it died soon after escaping.

=== Predators ===
Being eaten by a grass snake in Stavropol Krai, Russia

Marsh frogs of all life stages are known to fall prey to various predatory animals. The tadpoles have been noted to be very vulnerable to predation by large fish, with one experiment revealing tadpole mortality rates to be very high when European carp are present in the same body of water. Survival rates are higher when marsh frog tadpoles coexist with those of the European toad (which has chemical defences), as the carp learn to avoid eating tadpoles when the chemically-defended species is present. However, the associational protection does not last after the toads metamorphose and leave the water, at which point the carp will prey on the marsh frog tadpoles at a high rate. Snakes such as the grass snake and dice snake are also predators of this amphibian, though the latter is known to instead feed exclusively on fish in areas where both snake species occur, likely as a form of niche partitioning. In particular, a review on grass snakes in Bulgaria found that the marsh frog is the preferred prey of this reptile. The American mink (which is an introduced species in the range of the marsh frog) eats amphibians all year round but a larger part of its diet is made up of them during winter and spring, and this mammal will extract marsh frogs from their hibernation sites to eat them. Another mammalian predator of these frogs is the Eurasian otter, which has been noted to mostly feed on the juveniles and subadults.

=== Parasites ===
Throughout its life, the marsh frog serves as a host for many types of parasites, which occur in a wide range of body parts. The most common of these are parasitic worms, especially trematodes and nematodes. Depending on the species, these may occur in the digestive tract, lungs, reproductive system, muscles, kidneys, liver or bladder. A study on marsh frogs in Iran found that the most abundant parasites were larvae of Codonocephalus urniger and a species of Abbreviata, each present in more than half of the sampled frogs. Acanthocephalan worms also parasitise marsh frogs but are not as abundant; both a Turkish study and a Ukrainian study found only one species in these frogs, namely Acanthocephalus ranae. Another Turkish study found one other acanthocephalan, a species of Centrorhynchus, in their sampled frogs. A cestode worm, Ophiotaenia saphena, has been found in the intestines of marsh frogs in the lower Danube; this worm is notably not native to Europe and likely was introduced along with the American bullfrog. The number of species of worms parasitising marsh frogs varies between different colonies of frogs, with some studies finding only three worm species in one population while others recover as many as 26 in another population. Moderate levels of habitat modification (such as from urbanisation) reduce the diversity of the parasitic worms, favouring the more tolerant species, whereas higher levels of modification evenly lowers the abundance of all species. External parasites of the marsh frog include leeches, with the species Hirudo medicinalis, Batracobdella algira and Limnatis paluda having been found on its skin.

Non-animalian parasites of the marsh frog include various types of protozoans, a group consisting of several unrelated lineages of single-celled organisms. Protozoans commonly parasitise the frog's blood, with forms such as Hepatozoon, Dactylosoma, and Trypanosoma having been found in blood smears analysed via microscopy. Other forms like Opalina ranarum and Cepedea dimidiata inhabit the intestine. One protozoan, Myxobolus ridibundae, infects the testicles of male marsh frogs and causes cysts on them. Fungi also commonly occur on marsh frogs, with a Serbian study recording 18 species on the skin of this amphibian, though it is not clear whether some of these are parasitic or merely commensalistic. Among the most notable of the fungi is Batrachochytrium dendrobatidis, which causes the disease chytridiomycosis.

== As an invasive species ==
Adult seen in Newchapel, Surrey, UK, where the species is non-native

Historical records and genetic analysis prove that the marsh frog has been introduced to many regions outside of its natural range, with at least 19 European countries and multiple parts of Asia now harbouring introduced populations, and it is considered an invasive species in these areas. Invasive populations originate from multiple parts of their native range, with at least nine introduced lineages present throughout Europe. Most introductions occurred during the latter half of the 20th Century, though some took place as early as the 18th Century, with the oldest known introduction being when Elizabeth of Russia ordered for marsh frogs to be imported from southern Russia and released in parks on Yelagin Island, Saint Petersburg because she liked their calls. New cases of introductions continue to occur, with marsh frogs only first detected in parts of Italy during the early 21st Century. Introductions happen mainly because of intentional transportation and commercial trade of the frogs by humans, mostly as a food source, but also for research, education, the pet trade and use as an ornamental species. Some frogs are then either released or escape from captivity.

Because marsh frogs are highly adaptable, surviving in a wide range of habitats and having a generalist diet, they easily colonise areas they are introduced to. Furthermore, global warming may allow them to expand their range further and remain active for a longer period of the year. Their preferred environments often show a lot of overlap with that of native amphibians, exposing the native species to great risk of being preyed on by the marsh frogs or competing with them for resources. Predation by invasive marsh frogs poses a threat to native amphibians, with both adults and tadpoles of many species such as the palmate newt, Mediterranean tree frog and Western spadefoot toad suffering from heavy predation pressure.

In places where they were introduced, marsh frogs may interbreed with the native Pelophylax frogs and produce hybrid offspring. While marsh frogs naturally produce fertile hybrids with other Pelophylax species in parts of their native range, individuals originating from different locations do not have the same ability trigger genome elimination. Non-native marsh frog lineages may therefore produce either fertile or sterile hybrid offspring, which can have severe impacts on local populations of Pelophylax frogs. Such interbreeding may also dilute the gene pool, but there is evidence that it does not affect the overall population to a significant degree in some areas.

== Relationships with humans ==
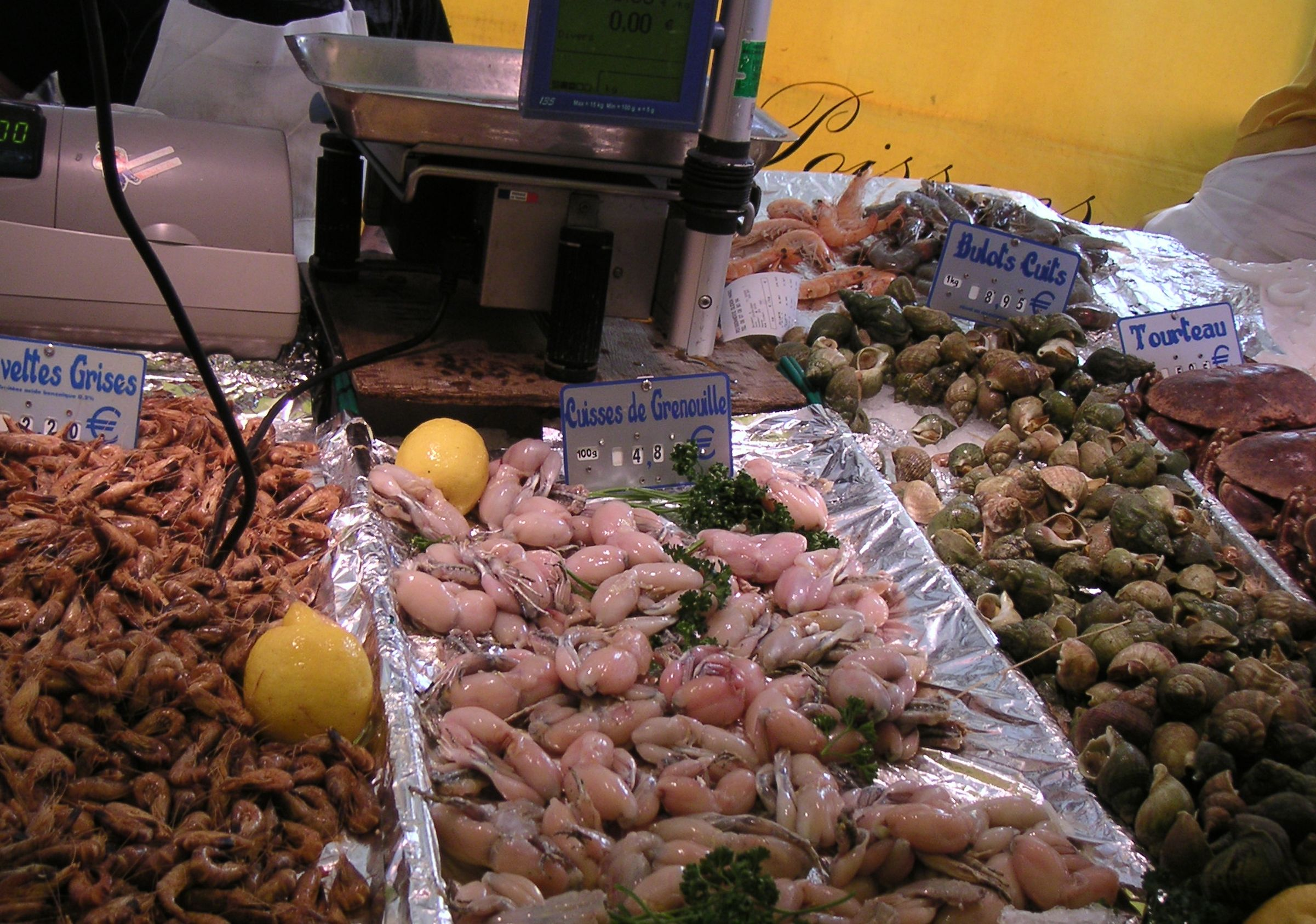
Raw frog legs for sale at a market in Paris, France

In parts of its range, the marsh frog is harvested and traded by humans as a food source, with its legs being the main part eaten. Some frogs are harvested from the wild, while others are commercially bred and reared in farms. Frog meat trading is commercially significant on a global scale, with harvested frogs being sold internationally to serve as food. The meat of the marsh frog has high amino acid and nutrient levels, and has thus been determined to be a worthwhile food source for commercial farming. Additionally, the high protein content and low fat level of frog meat makes it a fitting source of dietary and clinical nutrition. However, frog farms can also harbour pathogens which cause diseases in humans; studies have found that pathogenic bacteria is common not only on farmed marsh frogs, but also in their water and food, which can pose a risk to the health of both humans and frogs. In particular, one study found that Brucella microti-like bacteria were present in over 90% of the marsh frogs in French frog farms.

The International Union for Conservation of Nature (IUCN) has listed the conservation status of the marsh frog as Least Concern, stating that its wide range, high population and tolerance for many habitat types suggest that there is little risk of it becoming globally extinct. However, some localised populations are declining, with those in the former Yugoslavia, Turkey, east Asia and maybe Romania significantly decreasing due to severe pollution and excessive harvesting for the frog leg trade. Exposure to common pesticides in agricultural areas can cause considerable muscle atrophy and reduce the animal's survival rate. Severe pollution can even damage the DNA of the frog, causing abnormalities in the red blood cells and micronuclei of the cells. The marsh frog is listed on some local Red Data Lists and protected by law in certain countries such as in Bulgaria where it is listed as Near Threatened. Some regions have established measures to prevent these frogs from being killed on roads by vehicles, and harvest management is needed to protect it in certain areas.

Because it feeds primarily on insects, including species that can cause severe damage to crops, the marsh frog can serve as a form of biological control to combat agricultural pests. However, because the adult frogs also eat a large number of fish, they may cause severe damage to fish farms. Furthermore, due to the ecological damage done by this species in areas where it is introduced, there is also a need to control and eradicate it from its non-native range.
