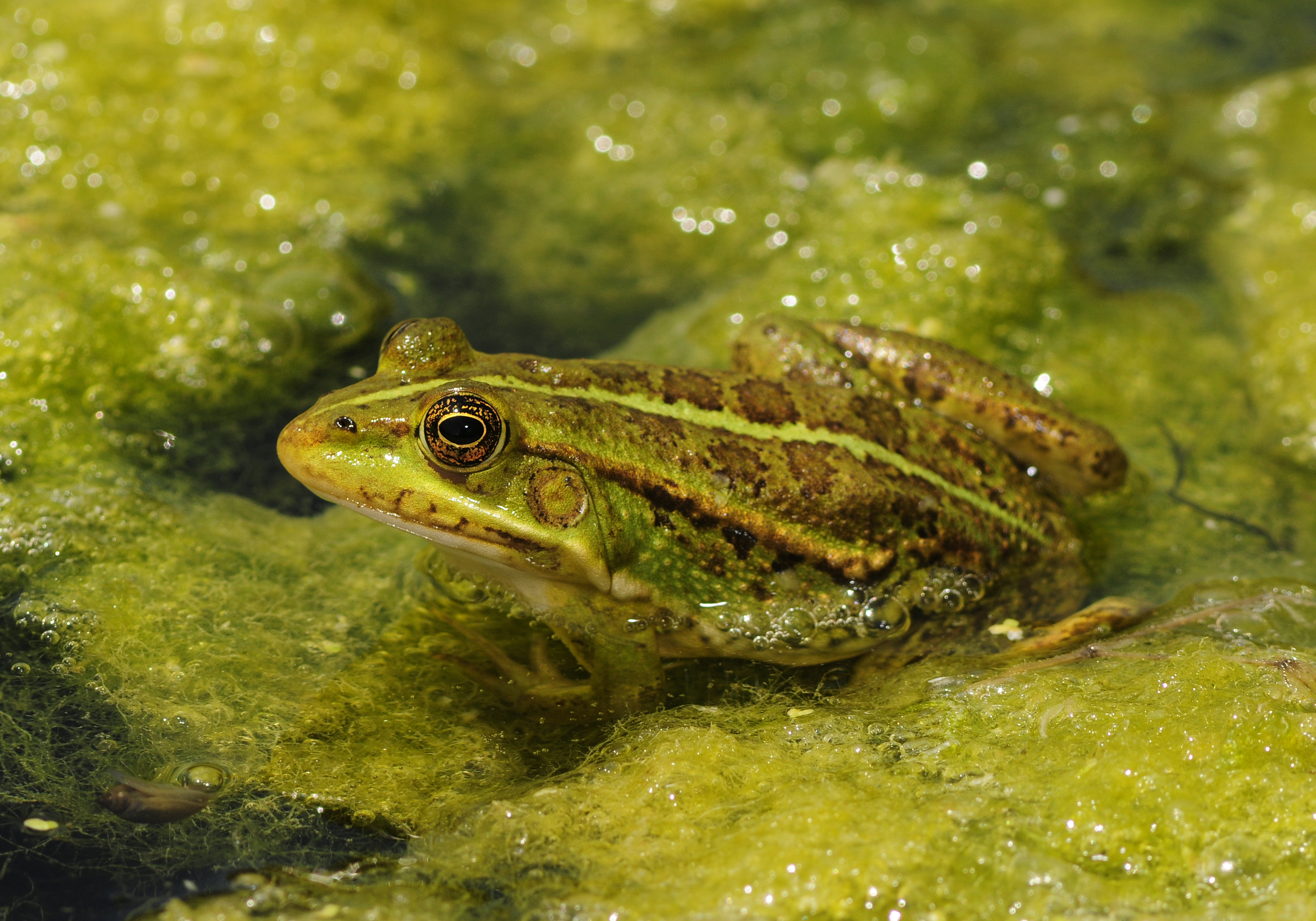

Conservation status
- Least Concern (IUCN 3.1)

Scientific classification
- Kingdom: Animalia
- Phylum: Chordata
- Class: Amphibia
- Order: Anura
- Family: Ranidae
- Genus: Pelophylax
- Species: P. kurtmuelleri

Binomial name
- Pelophylax kurtmuelleri (Gayda, 1940)

Synonyms
- Rana kurtmuelleri Gayda, 1940

= Balkan frog =

Species of amphibian

The Balkan frog (Pelophylax kurtmuelleri) also known as the Balkan water frog and Greek marsh frog) is a species of frog occurring in Greece and, to a lesser extent, in Albania, Montenegro, and Serbia. The species highly resembles Pelophylax ridibundus, from which it was only distinguished in 1991 by bio-acoustic analysis. The separation of the species is not unanimously accepted.

The average length is 72 mm for males, 78 mm for females. The back is green or occasionally brown, often with a light green stripe down the middle, and with darker spots irregularly distributed across the back. The tympanum is bronze or green surrounded by a darker color.

The species is found across Greece except in the northeastern corner, where P. ridibundus is found instead. In Western Greece it lives along with Pelophylax epeiroticus. It occurs from sea level up to 1000 m, though large populations are not found above 600 m. Small introduced populations live in Denmark, Poland and Italy.

== Description ==
The Balkan water frog has a body length of approximately 75 to 100 millimeters, with males reaching a maximum length of around 80 millimeters and females a maximum of 100 millimeters. They are therefore comparatively large water frogs, belonging to the same family as lake frogs, and exhibit pronounced sexual dimorphism.

The dorsal coloration is usually green, but in some individuals it may be partly or entirely brown. The dorsal side typically features a light green stripe running down the centre of the back and has irregularly distributed dark green, brown, grey or blackish spots. The underbelly is pale and usually unspotted. The eyes are set relatively close together; the eardrums are bronze-coloured or grey with a green central area. Males have pairs of pale or dark grey vocal sacs at the corners of the mouth.
