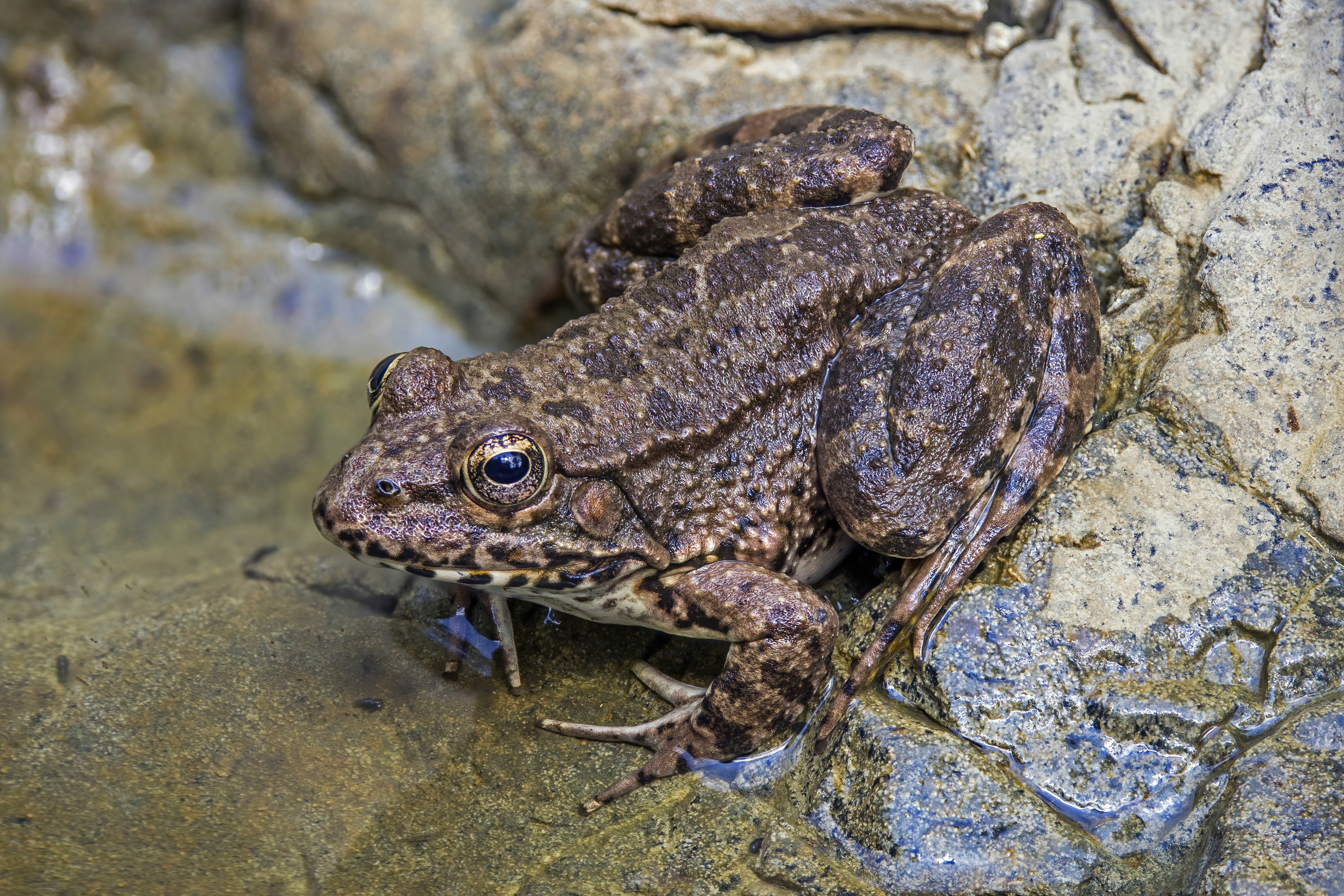

Conservation status
- Vulnerable (IUCN 3.1)

Scientific classification
- Kingdom: Animalia
- Phylum: Chordata
- Class: Amphibia
- Order: Anura
- Family: Ranidae
- Genus: Pelophylax
- Species: P. cypriensis

Binomial name
- Pelophylax cypriensis Plötner, Baier, Akn, Mazepa, Schreiber, Beerli, Litvinchuk, Bilgin, Borkin, and Uzzell, 2012

= Pelophylax cypriensis =

Species of frogs

Pelophylax cypriensis or the Cyprus water frog is a species of frog in the family Ranidae. It is endemic to the island of Cyprus. It is widespread in Cyprus, with the highest density in the Troodos area, the most humid part of the island. It can live in both stagnant and brackish water, including small pools, streams, and ditches.

== Taxonomy ==
The species was previously thought to be a population of Pelophylax cypriensis, but was split off as a distinct species in 2012. However, this taxonomic arrangement is not accepted by all authorities.

== Description ==
It is a medium-sized frog, being 6 to 10 cm (2.4 to 3.9 in) in length. Females (body length up to 75 mm or 3.0 in) are generally larger than males (up to 65 mm or 2.6 in). The skin is rather warty and colouration varies widely. There are four unwebbed toes on the front legs and five webbed toes on the hindlegs. Males have paired external vocal sacs.

== Distribution and habitat ==
The Cyprus water frog is endemic to and found throughout the island of Cyprus. It inhabits nearly all suitable water bodies on the island and is most common in the Troodos area, its type locality and the most humid part of the island. It has not been recorded from large areas of the Mesaoria Plain in central, eastern, and southeastern Cyprus. It is also sparsely recorded from the north of the island, especially the Karpas Peninsula, but this lack of records is likely due to undersampling in the region. Subpopulations of the species are frequently found in artificial water bodies and near some streams, especially in the Pedieos watershed. It occurs at altitudes of up to 1,700 m (5,600 ft).

It occurs in a wide variety of aquatic habitats such as streams, ponds, ditches, and wetlands, surrounded by forests, shrubland, or grassland. It occurs in both brackish and stagnant water bodies.

== Ecology ==
Breeding takes place between March and June. Female Cyprus water frogs spawn clutches of up to 10,000 eggs in stagnant water bodies during the spring. Tadpoles develop in the water before metamorphosing during the summer. The species is known to feed on insects, mosquitofish, and, in one case, on a bird nestling.

== Conservation ==
The Cyprus water frog faces a variety of threats, including habitat loss, climate change, harvesting for consumption, and non-native Pelophylax frogs and freshwater fish. Due to these threats, its restricted range, and decreasing population, it is listed as being vulnerable on the IUCN Red List. Urbanisation and development in coastal regions, the draining of wetlands for agriculture, and climate-change induced droughts are all decreasing the extent and quality of the frog's habitat. Additionally, frog legs are a traditionally popular food in Cyprus and the species is probably harvested for its legs. The import of other Pelophylax frogs for their legs could also threaten the Cyprus water frog by leading to hybridisation with them. Invasive freshwater fish are widespread in Cyprus and may represent a predatory threat to the Cyprus water frog.

The species is found in Troodos National Forest Park and Cape Greco National Forest Park.

== Gallery ==
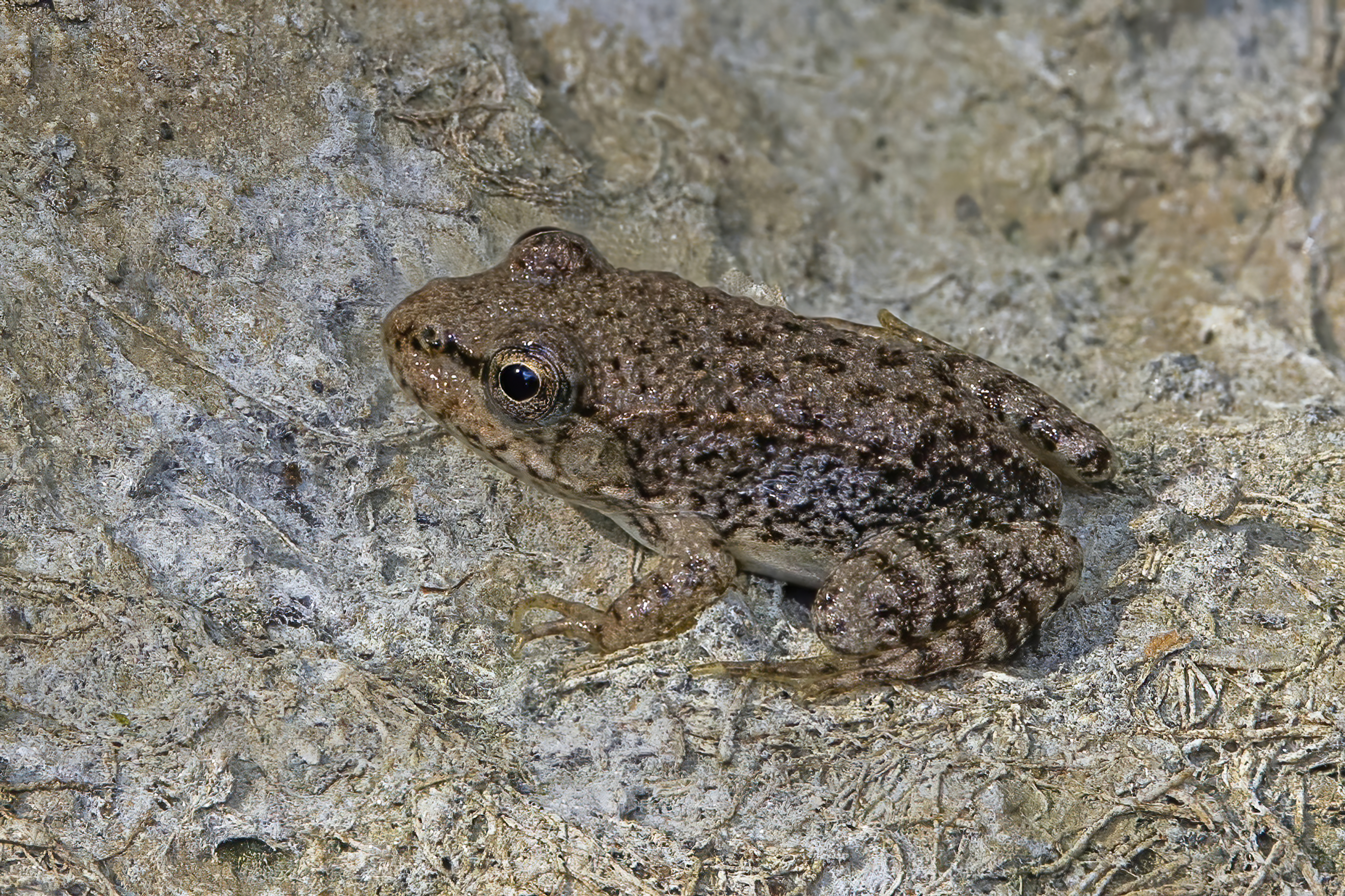
Juvenile

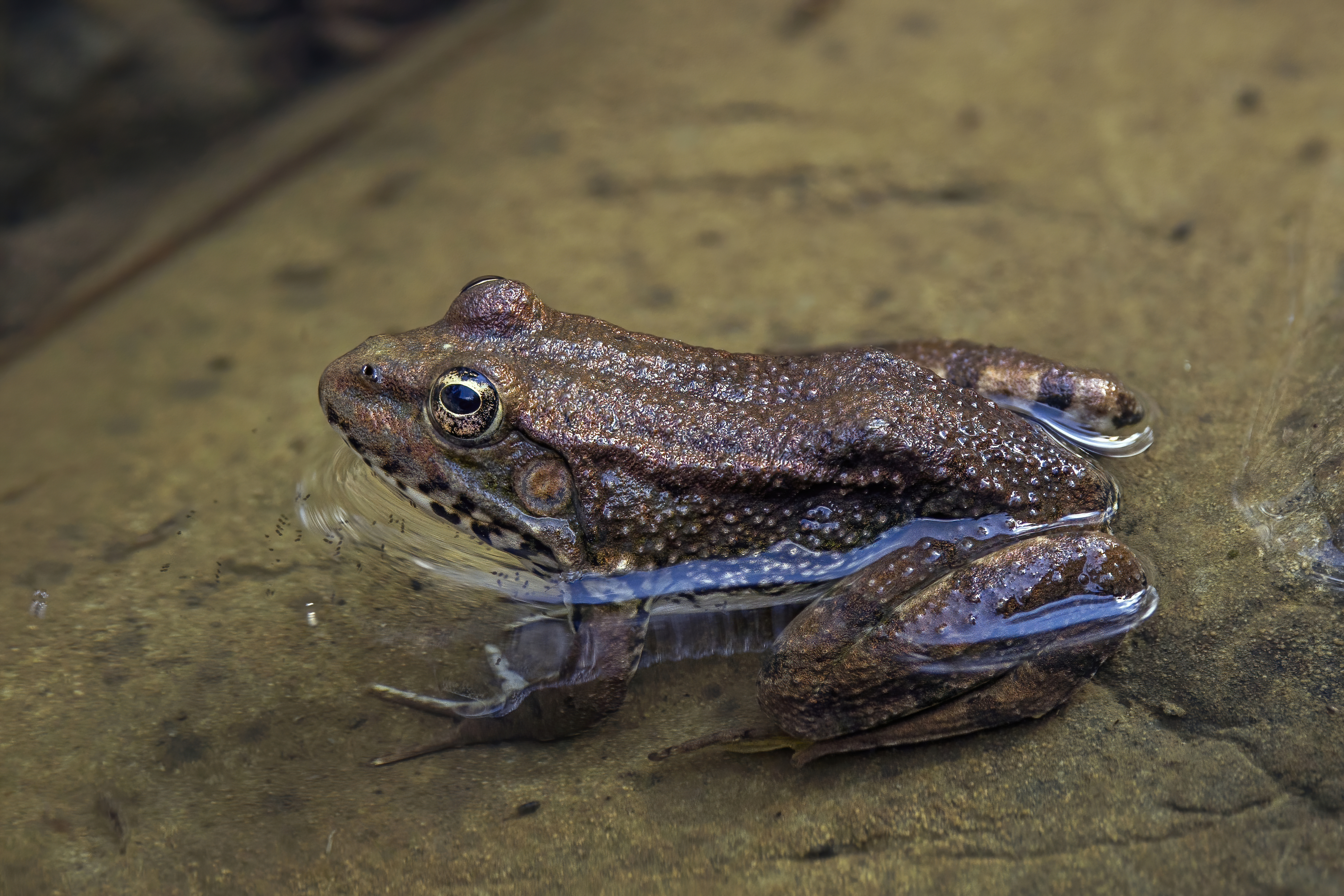

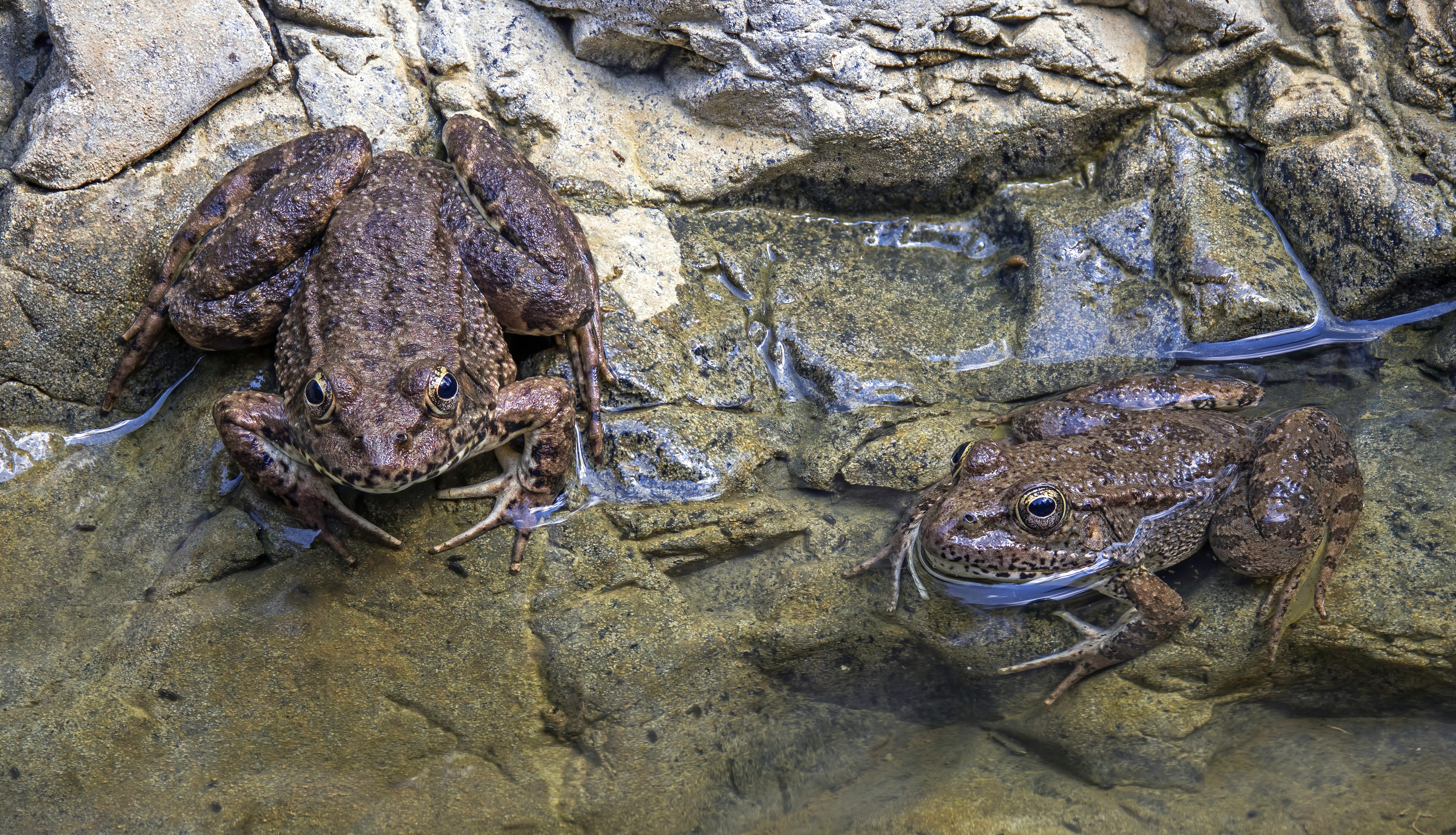
