= Pelophylax terentievi =

Conservation status
- Data Deficient (IUCN 3.1)

Scientific classification
- Kingdom: Animalia
- Phylum: Chordata
- Class: Amphibia
- Order: Anura
- Family: Ranidae
- Genus: Pelophylax
- Species: P. terentievi

Binomial name
- Pelophylax terentievi (Mezhzherin, 1992)

Synonyms
- Rana terentievi Mezhzherin, 1992

Species of amphibian

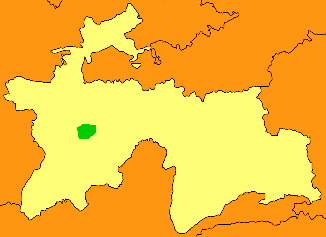
Distribution of Pelophylax terentievi

Pelophylax terentievi, commonly known as Terentjev's frog or Central Asian pond frog, is a species of frog in the family Ranidae. It is found in Xinjiang, China and Tajikistan, and possibly in Afghanistan.

Its natural habitats are swamps and hot deserts. Its status is insufficiently known.

== Description ==
Pelophylax terentievi have complex layers of tubular bones where dark rings are present. Dark rings are due to growth stunts during periods of inadequate nutrition or hibernation.
