= Alain Dubois =

French herpetologist

- Born: 4 June 1948 (age 78); Paris, France
- Education: University of Paris; Ecole Normale Supérieure
- Known for: Amphibian taxonomy, evolution, and biogeography
- Scientific career
- Fields: Herpetology, taxonomy, biogeography
- Workplaces: Muséum national d'histoire naturelle
- Thesis: Contribution a l'etude des amphibians du Nepal: les grenouilles du sous-genre Paa (famille Ranidae, genre Rana) (1976)
- Author abbrev. (zoology): Dubois

Alain Dubois (born 4 June 1948) is a French herpetologist and zoological taxonomist. Developing an early interest in frogs, with his research publication at age 20, he became the first to study frogs of Nepal and those of the surrounding India and Pakistan. He spent his entire professional career at the Muséum national d'histoire naturelle in Paris. He had served as editor-in-chief of Amphibia-Reptilia, Alytes and Bionomina, and as editor of Zootaxa and PeerJ.

== Biography ==
Dubois was born in Paris to Jacques Dubois and Suzanne Dubois. He developed an early fascination for animals, and had made a catalogue by twelve years of age. As a student, he joined the secondary school association for young naturalists, called Société des Naturalistes du Lycée Carnot. When he learned of the works of Jean Rostand, a zoologist and philosopher of science, who had created a private laboratory at his home in Ville d'Avray, near Paris, he was much impressed that he would spent most of his Sundays at Rostand's. Rostand told him how to do research and started working on amphibian at age 14. In 1968, Rostand helped him to publish his first scientific work on the frogs (focussing on Rana esculenta) and toad pigmentation in two papers in the Bulletin Mensuel de la Société Linnéenne de Lyon.

In 1965, Dubois enrolled in the Faculté des Sciences at the University of Paris to study biology. Participating in a student expedition, he spent 14 months hiking Nepal during 1968-1969. There he met Corneille Jest of the French National Centre for Scientific Research who asked him to join his exploration. With the help of Jest, he was able to collect more than 10,000 amphibian specimens and document them with photographs. After returning home, he analysed and compiled his observations publishing several research papers. In 1976, he earned a doctoral degree from the Ecole Normale Supérieure de Paris under the supervision of Maxime Lamotte on the thesis Contribution a l'etude des amphibians du Nepal: les grenouilles du sous-genre Paa (famille Ranidae, genre Rana).

In 1978, Dubois worked as a technician at the Muséum national d'histoire naturelle in Paris. He became a renowned specialist in the study of extant amphibians and is notably the author of works on their taxonomy, evolution, and biogeography. He has also published works on biological nomenclature, aimed at improving the International Code of Zoological Nomenclature, and has even proposed an alternative code. He eventually became full professor and Director of the Reptiles-Amphibians Laboratory of the museum.

He has also published on the concept of genus in biology, notably in Le genre en zoologie : essai de systématique théorique (1988). He was a founding member of the Société Française de Systématique.

Dubois served as editor in the major herpetological and zoological journals – as editor-in-chief of Amphibia-Reptilia, Alytes and Bionomina, and as editor of Zootaxa and PeerJ.

== Bibliography ==
- Dubois, Alain (September 1986). "À propos de l'emploi controversé du terme « monophylétique » : Nouvelles propositions". Bulletin mensuel de la Société linnéenne de Lyon. 55 (7): 248–254. doi:10.3406/linly.1986.10766. ISSN 0366-1326.
- Dubois, Alain (18 February 2011). "The International Code of Zoological Nomenclature must be drastically improved before it is too late". Bionomina (2). Auckland: Magnolia Press: 1–104. doi:10.11646/bionomina.2.1.1. ISSN 1179-7649.
- Alain Dubois, Jean Rostand : biologiste contre le nucléaire, Paris, Berg International, 2012. ISBN 978-2917191491
