= Fri, Kasos =

Capital of Kasos, Greece

Fri Φρυ
- Settlement
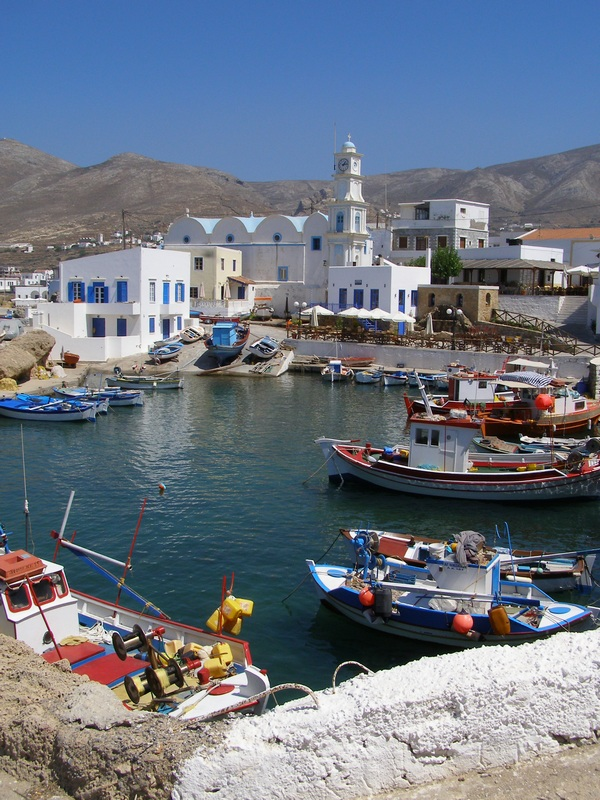
- Old Harbor of Fri

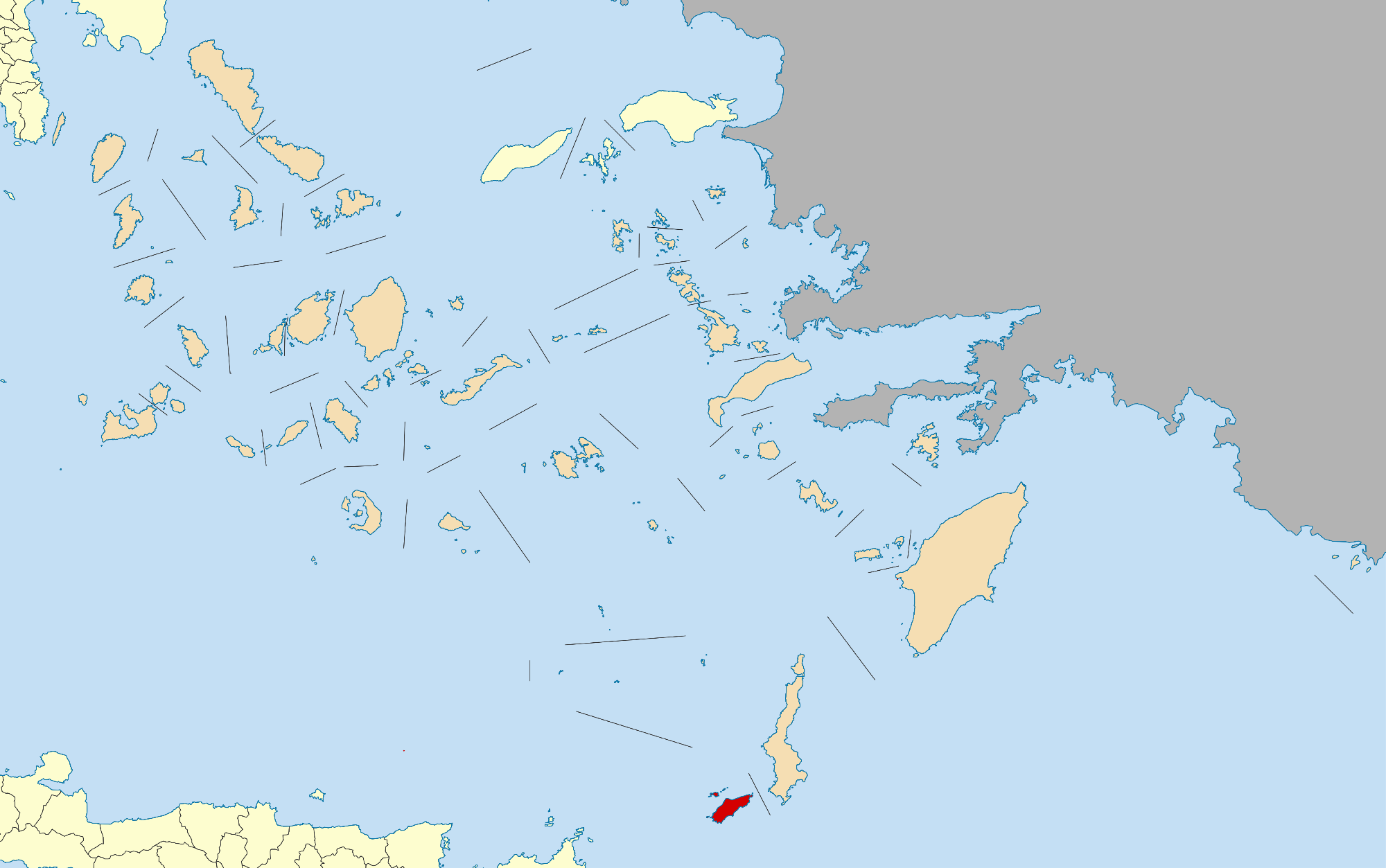

- Location within Greece
- Coordinates: 35°23′51″N 26°55′30″E
- Country: Greece
- Administrative region: South Aegean
- Regional unit: Karpathos-Kasos
- Municipality: Kasos
- Village established: 1840 (186 years ago)

Population (2021)
  - Total: 346
- Time zone: UTC+2 (EET)
  - Summer (DST): UTC+3 (EEST)
- Postal code: 85800
- Area code: 22450
- Vehicle registration: ΚΧ, ΡΟ, ΡΚ

Fri (Greek: Φρυ) is the capital of the Greek island of Kasos in the Dodecanese. As of 2021, its population was 346.

== Geography ==
Fri is located in the northern coast of Kasos. The settlement is built around the Mpouka bay. East of Fri is Mpouka and 500 meters from Fri is the old harbour, Emporeios.

== History ==
Fri was built in 1840 from inhabitants of Aghia Marina and refugees of the Kasos Massacre. The name was probably given due to the shape of the shoreline which resembles an eyebrow. The seat of the municipality of Kasos is located in Fri as well as a local clinic and the archeological museum. Today, Fri has a small sports center and a public library. There is also an elementary school. Since 2010 the meteorological station of the National Observatory of Athens is located in the Municipality of Kasos in Fri. The port of Fri is connected with Piraeus, Crete, Karpathos and Rhodes. Most of the houses in Fri have two floors and feature a traditional architecture. These houses are found in Fri the last 150 years along with old churches and monasteries.

== Climate ==
Fri has a hot semi-arid climate (Köppen climate classification: BSh). According to the data of the National Observatory of Athens and the Hellenic National Meteorological Service stations, Fri records the mildest winters in Greece, with a record low temperature of 2.7 °C (for the period 1989–2025). It is also the second driest area of Greece after Schoinoussa. Fri falls in 11a hardiness zone.

Climate data for Fri 4 m a.s.l.
Month	Jan	Feb	Mar	Apr	May	Jun	Jul	Aug	Sep	Oct	Nov	Dec	Year
Record high °C (°F)	22.5 (72.5)	25.2 (77.4)	25.8 (78.4)	30.5 (86.9)	36.7 (98.1)	37.2 (99.0)	35.7 (96.3)	36.9 (98.4)	35.7 (96.3)	32.8 (91.0)	27.4 (81.3)	24.4 (75.9)	37.2 (99.0)
Mean daily maximum °C (°F)	16.2 (61.2)	16.3 (61.3)	17.5 (63.5)	19.9 (67.8)	23.4 (74.1)	26.2 (79.2)	28.2 (82.8)	28.3 (82.9)	26.8 (80.2)	23.8 (74.8)	20.9 (69.6)	17.9 (64.2)	22.1 (71.8)
Daily mean °C (°F)	14.1 (57.4)	14.1 (57.4)	15.2 (59.4)	17.3 (63.1)	20.7 (69.3)	24.0 (75.2)	26.2 (79.2)	26.6 (79.9)	25.0 (77.0)	21.8 (71.2)	18.9 (66.0)	15.8 (60.4)	20.0 (68.0)
Mean daily minimum °C (°F)	11.9 (53.4)	12.0 (53.6)	12.8 (55.0)	14.6 (58.3)	18.0 (64.4)	21.8 (71.2)	24.2 (75.6)	24.9 (76.8)	23.2 (73.8)	19.9 (67.8)	16.8 (62.2)	13.8 (56.8)	17.8 (64.1)
Record low °C (°F)	2.7 (36.9)	4.3 (39.7)	5.2 (41.4)	7.2 (45.0)	13.6 (56.5)	16.2 (61.2)	20.4 (68.7)	21.1 (70.0)	17.6 (63.7)	14.4 (57.9)	11.1 (52.0)	6.3 (43.3)	2.7 (36.9)
Average rainfall mm (inches)	54.8 (2.16)	31.0 (1.22)	35.7 (1.41)	12.0 (0.47)	9.1 (0.36)	1.7 (0.07)	0.9 (0.04)	0.3 (0.01)	3.3 (0.13)	20.7 (0.81)	26.9 (1.06)	53.4 (2.10)	249.8 (9.84)
Source 1: Karpathiakanea.gr
Source 2: National Observatory of Athens Monthly Bulletins (Jul 2010-Jan 2026) and World Meteorological Organization
