= Kasos (city) =

Coordinates: 35°24′14″N 26°56′17″E

Kasos or Casos or Casus (Ancient Greek: Κάσος) was a city and polis (city-state) of ancient Greece on the island of Kasos. It was located in the interior of the island; its port was at Emporeion.

Its site is located near modern Kastro/Poli.
