= Lyciasalamandra flavimembris =

Conservation status
- Endangered (IUCN 3.1)

Scientific classification
- Kingdom: Animalia
- Phylum: Chordata
- Class: Amphibia
- Order: Urodela
- Family: Salamandridae
- Genus: Lyciasalamandra
- Species: L. flavimembris

Binomial name
- Lyciasalamandra flavimembris (Mutz and Steinfartz, 1995)

Synonyms
- Mertensiella luschani flavimembris Mutz and Steinfartz, 1995

Species of amphibian

Lyciasalamandra flavimembris, the Marmaris Lycian salamander or Marmaris salamander, is a species of salamander in the family Salamandridae. It is endemic to Turkey and is found along the southwestern Anatolian coast between Marmaris and Ula. It was first described as subspecies of Mertensiella luschani, now Lyciasalamandra luschani.

== Description ==
Adult males measure 52–74 mm (2.0–2.9 in) in snout–vent length and 102–142 mm (4.0–5.6 in) in total length. Adult females measure 48–77 mm (1.9–3.0 in) in snout–vent length and 90–149 mm (3.5–5.9 in) in total length. The specific name flavimembris refers to the yellow limbs of this species. The body has dark brown ground colour above, with silvery white spotting; the tail is slightly lighter. The parotoid glands are yellow. There are also lightly coloured patches above the eyes. The venter is unpigmented, forming sharp contrast with the dorsal colouration.

== Habitat and conservation ==
Lyciasalamandra flavimembris is associated with rocky limestone outcrops and occurs at elevations up to 890 m (2,920 ft) above sea level. It is often found in maquis shrubland or pine woodlands. It is a rare species threatened by habitat loss from forest fires and by collection for scientific purposes. However, while IUCN (2009) concluded that "there is only limited habitat loss taking place", Göçmen and Kariş (2017) stated that the known populations "were under heavy habitat destruction".
