= Nisyrus (Karpathos) =

Nisyrus or Nisyros (Ancient Greek: Νίσυρος) was a town of ancient Greece on the island of Karpathos.

Its site is unlocated.
