= Giannis Louloudis =

Entrepreneur

- Born: March 27, 2004 (age 21); Rhodes
- Occupation: Entrepreneur
- Parents: Christos Louloudis (father); Chrysovalantou Diamantea (mother)

Giannis Louloudis (born 27 March 2004) is a Greek Sneaker Collector and reseller.

== Early life ==
Giannis Louloudis was born to Christos Louloudis and Diamantea Chrysovalantou on 27 March 2004. Raised in Karpathos and now living in Rhodes, Greece.

== Career ==
In April 2021, Louloudis along with Nick Pelardis started designing their first sneaker, the 'Mpasok Lows' which are based on the logo of the Panhellenic Socialist Movement.
