= Andrea Morisco =

Andrea Morisco (in Greek: Ἀνδρέας Μουρίσκος, Andreas Mouriskos) was a Genoese pirate active in the Aegean Sea in the late 13th century, who in 1304 entered the service of the Byzantine Empire. As an admiral and corsair, he was active under Byzantine colours until 1308, when he was captured and executed in Cyprus.

== Life ==
Morisco was a Genoese pirate, active at least since 1279, who had had a successful career fighting against both the Turks and the Venetians. In late 1304, Morisco with his two ships entered the service of the Byzantine emperor Andronikos II Palaiologos, who gave him the rank of vestiarios. The Venetians in retaliation attacked him and burned one of his ships, but in 1305, he attacked the island of Tenedos, and with the aid of some passing Genoese ships recovered it for the Empire.

At this time, the Byzantines became involved in open war against the mercenaries of the Catalan Company, whom they had invited to fight against the Turks, but who now had turned against Byzantium. In this war, Morisco supplied the town of Madyta, which was besieged by the Catalans, with food, and intercepted the passage of some Turkish allies of the Catalans from crossing over the Hellespont back into Anatolia—the latter a dubious success, as they proceeded to raid the Byzantine province of Thrace instead. For his service, Andronikos II made Morisco an admiral and gave him and his brother Lodovico the islands of Rhodes, Karpathos and Kasos as fiefs.

During one of his fights with the Catalans in the Sea of Marmara, he was defeated and captured by the Catalans, but was able to buy his freedom and returned to Tenedos. In 1306, he was back in action, and along with the Byzantines' Genoese allies participated in the unsuccessful siege of Gallipoli, which was held by the Catalans. In 1307 and 1308, along with other Byzantine-sponsored pirates, Morisco was active in the Aegean, attacking Venetian shipping off the Peloponnese.

In 1308, Morisco was captured by King Henry II of Cyprus, and executed by hanging in Famagusta.

== Sources ==
- Laiou, Angeliki E. (1972). Constantinople and the Latins: The Foreign Policy of Andronicus II, 1282–1328. Harvard University Press. ISBN 0-674-16535-7.
- Luttrell, Anthony (1997). "The Genoese at Rhodes: 1306–1312". In Balletto, L. (ed.). Oriente e Occidente tra Medioevo ed età moderna: Studi in onore di Geo Pistarino. Genoa: Acqui Terme. pp. 737–761. OCLC 606372603.
- Nicol, Donald M. (1993). The Last Centuries of Byzantium, 1261–1453 (Second ed.). Cambridge: Cambridge University Press. ISBN 978-0-521-43991-6.
- Trapp, Erich; Beyer, Hans-Veit; Walther, Rainer; Sturm-Schnabl, Katja; Kislinger, Ewald; Leontiadis, Ioannis; Kaplaneres, Sokrates (1976–1996). Prosopographisches Lexikon der Palaiologenzeit (in German). Vienna: Verlag der Österreichischen Akademie der Wissenschaften. ISBN 3-7001-3003-1.
