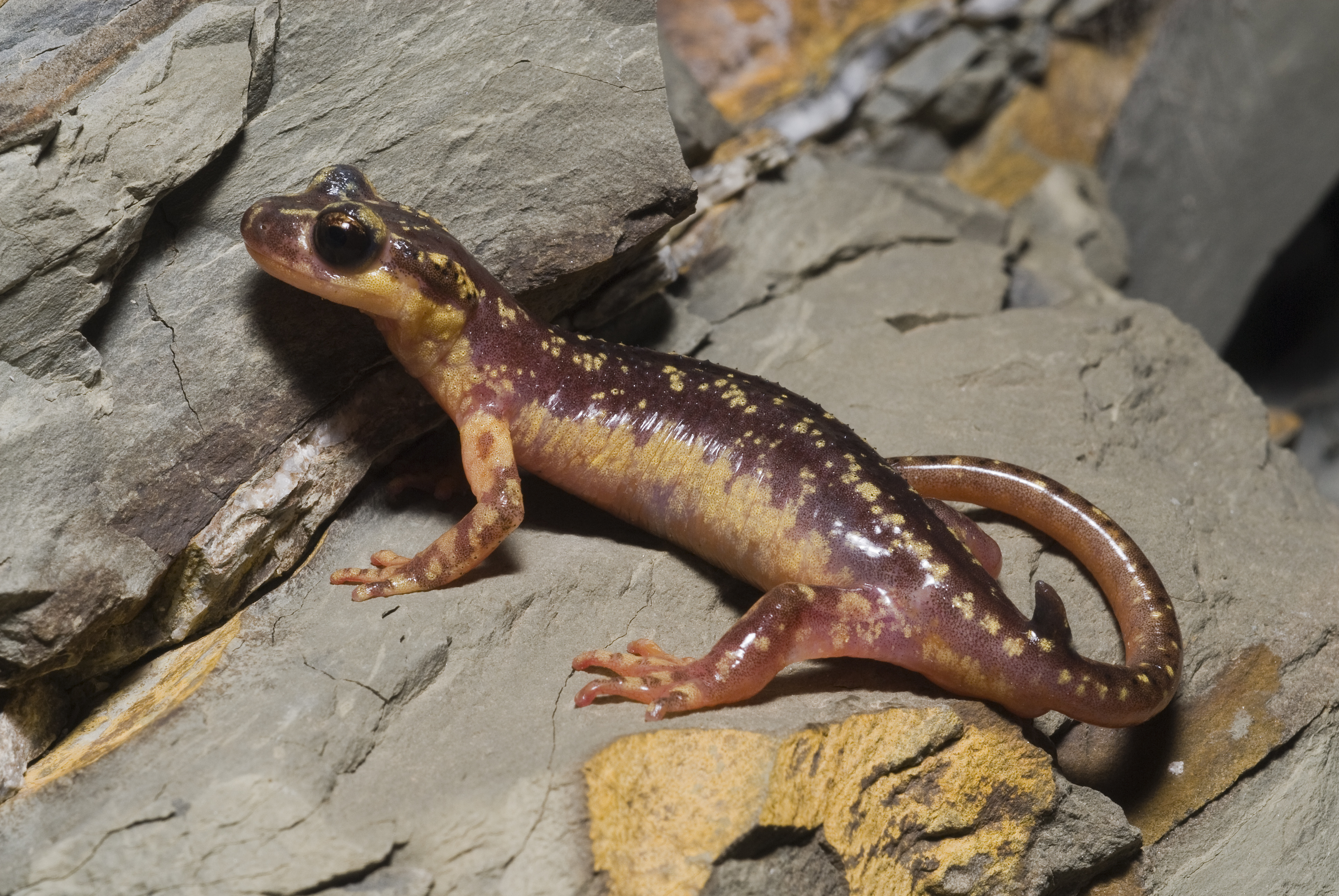

Conservation status
- Vulnerable (IUCN 3.1)

Scientific classification
- Kingdom: Animalia
- Phylum: Chordata
- Class: Amphibia
- Order: Urodela
- Family: Salamandridae
- Genus: Lyciasalamandra
- Species: L. helverseni

Binomial name
- Lyciasalamandra helverseni (Pieper, 1963)

= Lyciasalamandra helverseni =

Species of amphibian

Lyciasalamandra helverseni, the Karpathos salamander, is a viviparous species of salamander in the family Salamandridae found only in Greece. Its natural habitats are Mediterranean-type shrubby vegetation and rocky areas.

== Description ==
The Karpathos salamander can reach up to 14 centimeters (5.5 inches) in length. The females of this species are typically larger than the males and have more rough skin on their back. Males have a thorny tubercle on the dorsal area at the base of their tail.

== Reproduction ==
During mating, the male grabs the female's front legs with his mouth in order to force her on his back, so he can press his tubercle up to the female's cloaca and place a spermatophore. The female gives birth to fully developed juveniles, the number of which is usually less than three.

== Habitat and distribution ==
The Karpathos salamander is endemic to the islands of Karpathos, Saria and Kasos. All three of them are located in the southeast Aegean Sea and are part of the Aegean and Western Turkey sclerophyllous and mixed forests ecoregion. These salamanders are typically found in areas with limestone, such as pine forests, maquis shrublands and rocky areas. In the summer, they can be found in limestone caves; and they are often near human settlements in loose rock walls and ruins. They prefer low temperatures and humid conditions and unlike many amphibians, they birth on land and they are not associated with water.

== Status and conservation ==
The Karpathos salamander is fairly common within its restricted range. Despite that, it is listed as a vulnerable species in the IUCN Red List of Threatened Species because it is known from fewer than five locations. The most threatened population is the one in the island of Kasos. This species occurs in some protected areas, all of which are part of the Natura 2000 network.
