= Ismael Gibraltar =

Ottoman admiral (died c.1825)

Ismail Gibraltar in 1819 at the age of 43; lithography by Johann Friedrich Fritz in Hamburg after a painting by Christoffer Suhr

Ismael Gibraltar was an Ottoman admiral active during the Greek War of Independence as the commander of the Egyptian fleet.

In August–October 1821, after the outbreak of the Greek War of Independence, he commanded the Egyptian squadron that joined the fleet of Nasuhzade Ali Pasha. After relieving Patras, on 1 October, Ali sent Ismael Gibraltar into the Gulf of Corinth, where he destroyed the commercial port of Galaxeidi; 34 vessels were captured and the rest of the town's fleet, the largest in western Greece, burned.

In 1824, he was placed by the ruler of Egypt, Muhammad Ali, in command of a fleet of three frigates and ten sloops, with some 3,000 Albanian troops, to capture the island of Kasos, whose inhabitants had been raiding Ottoman shipping during the previous years. The Egyptian force landed on 19 June 1824, catching the Kasiots completely unaware. For only 30 casualties among the Albanian segment of the Egyptian force, the island was plundered and destroyed: 500 men were slain, and over 2,000 women and children were enslaved.

He acted as an emissary of Muhammad Ali, for whom he completed diplomatic missions in England, Sweden, Germany, and Italy.

His date and circumstances of death are variously recorded: according to an anonymous necrology he died in 1826 in a military encounter with the Greeks unrecorded elsewhere; according to others sources he died from disease during his return to Alexandria after the battles of autumn 1824 between the Greeks and the Egypto-Ottomans, i.e. late 1824 or early 1825.
