= Armathia =

Island in Greece

Native name: Αρμάθια
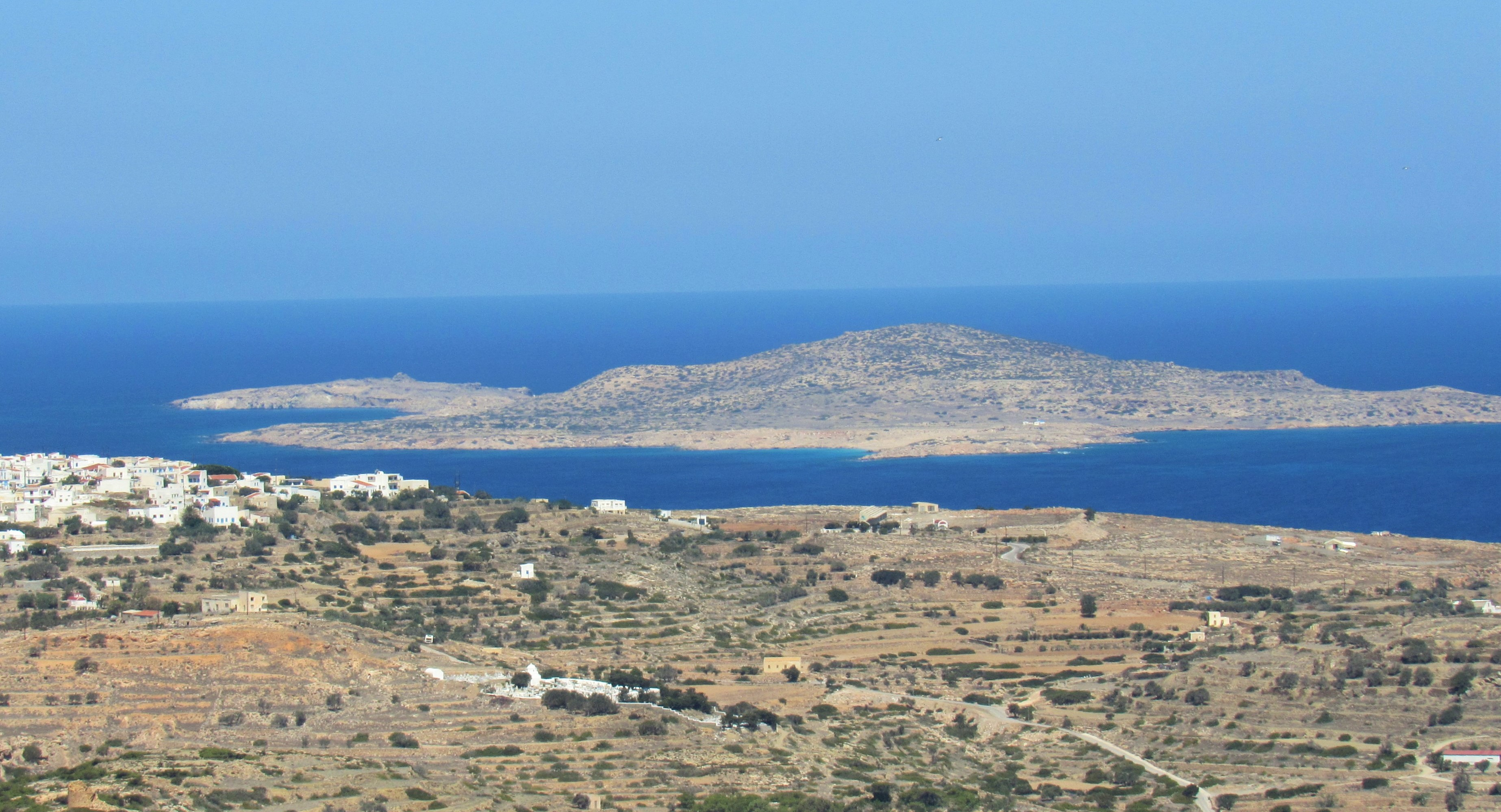
- View of Armathia from Kasos
- Interactive map of Armathia

Geography
- Coordinates: 35°26′12″N 26°51′49″E
- Archipelago: Dodecanese

Administration
- Greece
- Region: South Aegean
- Regional unit: Karpathos-Kasos
- Municipality: Heroic Island of Kasos

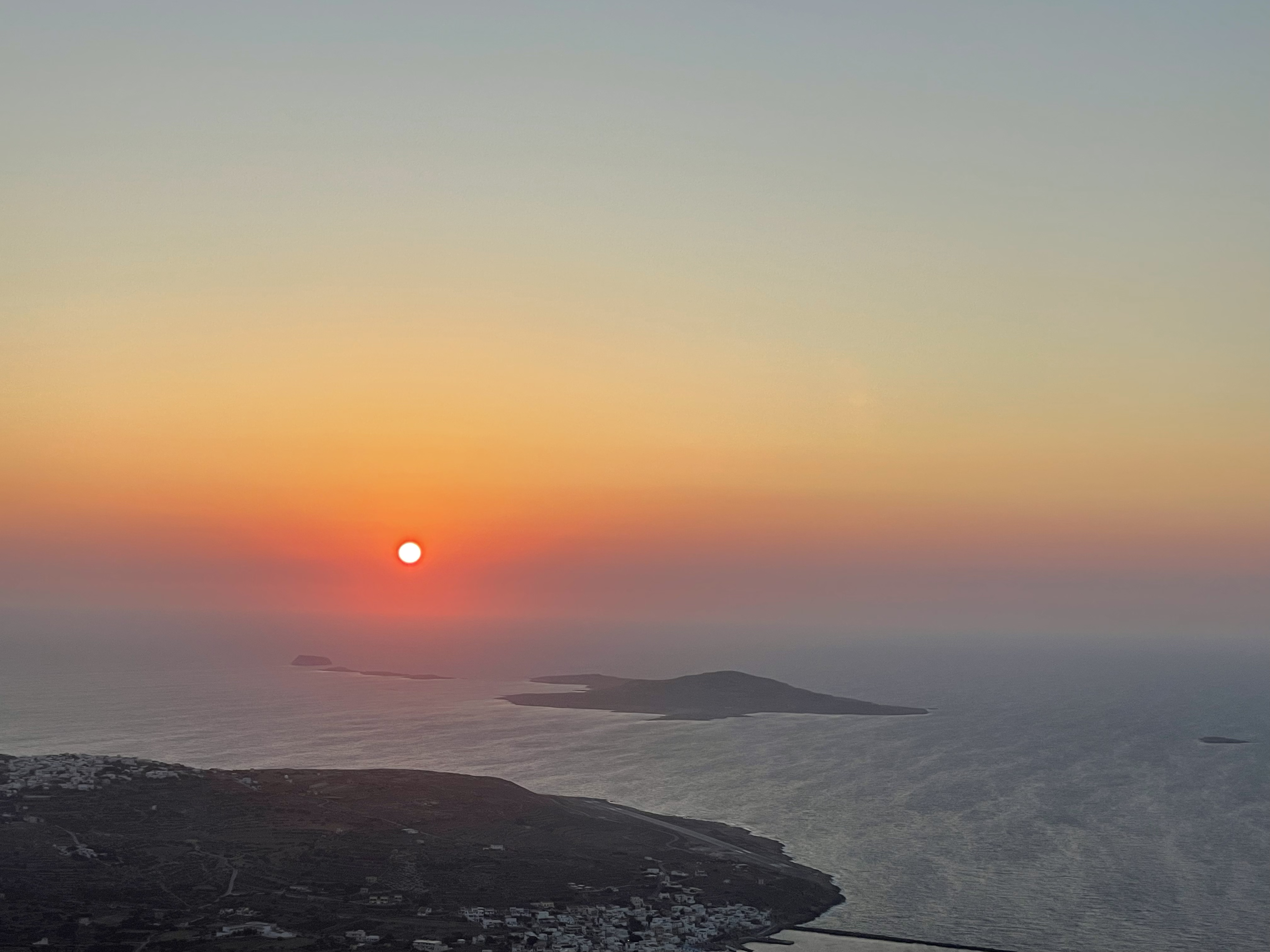
View of Armathia from Kasos at sunset

Armathia (Greek: Αρμάθια) is a Greek island belonging to the Dodecanese group in the eastern Aegean Sea. It is part of the municipality of Kasos. In the census of 1951, there were 8 recorded inhabitants, but it has since become uninhabited. At its peak, it sustained a community of over 100 who were mainly involved in mining the rich deposits of gypsum intended for export. It is now a tourist destination for day trippers from neighbouring developed islands. An observatory attracts wildlife observers.

== Sources ==
- Giannopoulos, Giannis (2006). "Δωδεκάνησος, η γένεση ενός ονόματος και η αντιμετώπισή του από τους Ιταλούς" [Dodecanese, the genesis of a name and the Italian approach]. Ἑῶα καὶ Ἑσπέρια (in Greek). 6: 275–296. doi:10.12681/eoaesperia.78. ISSN 2241-7540.
