= Lyciasalamandra fazilae =

Conservation status
- Endangered (IUCN 3.1)

Scientific classification
- Kingdom: Animalia
- Phylum: Chordata
- Class: Amphibia
- Order: Urodela
- Family: Salamandridae
- Genus: Lyciasalamandra
- Species: L. fazilae

Binomial name
- Lyciasalamandra fazilae (Basoglu & Atatür, 1974)

Species of amphibian

Lyciasalamandra fazilae, or Fazila's salamander, is a species of salamander in the family Salamandridae found only in Turkey. Its natural habitats are temperate forests and Mediterranean-type shrubby vegetation. It is threatened by habitat loss.
