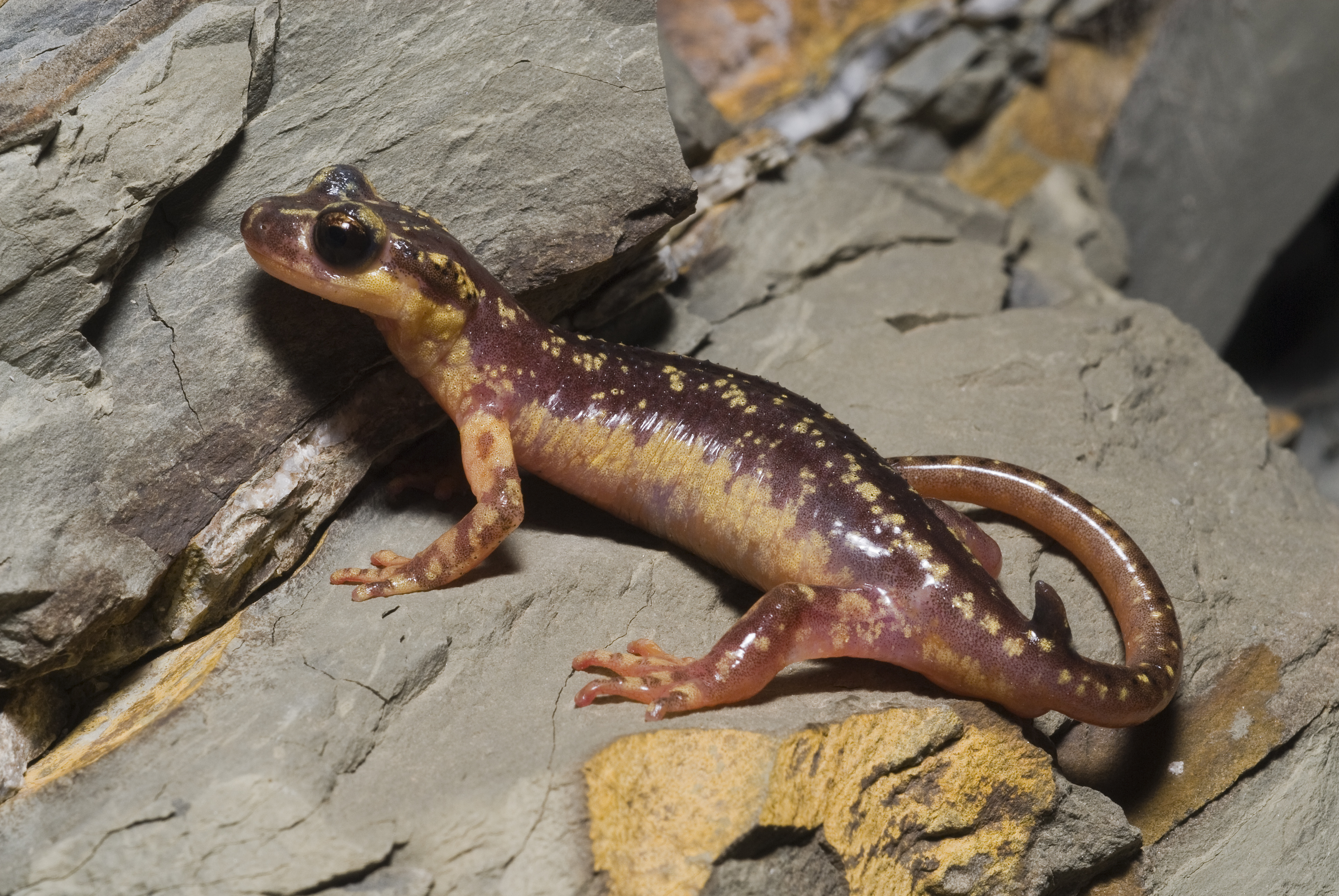
- Lyciasalamandra helverseni

Scientific classification
- Domain: Eukaryota
- Kingdom: Animalia
- Phylum: Chordata
- Class: Amphibia
- Order: Urodela
- Family: Salamandridae
- Subfamily: Salamandrinae
- Genus: Lyciasalamandra; Veith and Steinfartz, 2004

Type species
- Lyciasalamandra luschani

= Lyciasalamandra =

Genus of amphibians

Lyciasalamandra is a genus of salamanders in the family Salamandridae. They are native to southwestern coast of Turkey and nearby Aegean Islands (Greece). As of early 2018, all species in the genus are threatened. The common name Lycian salamanders has been coined for them.

== Species ==
Lyciasalamandra contains seven recognized species:

Image	Scientific name	Distribution
	Lyciasalamandra antalyana (Basoglu and Baran, 1976)	Turkey.
	Lyciasalamandra atifi (Basoglu, 1967)	Turkey.
	Lyciasalamandra billae (Franzen and Klewen, 1987)	Turkey.
	Lyciasalamandra fazilae (Basoglu and Atatür, 1974)	Turkey.
	Lyciasalamandra flavimembris (Mutz and Steinfartz, 1995)	Turkey.
	Lyciasalamandra helverseni (Pieper, 1963)	Greece.
	Lyciasalamandra luschani (Steindachner, 1891)	Greece, Turkey

Molecular data suggest that some recently described species (Lyciasalamandra irfani, Lyciasalamandra arikani, and Lyciasalamandra yehudahi), which as of early 2018 are still listed by the AmphibiaWeb, should be considered as subspecies of Lyciasalamandra billae.

== Reproduction ==
All Lyciasalamandra species are viviparous, as are four species of Salamandra.
