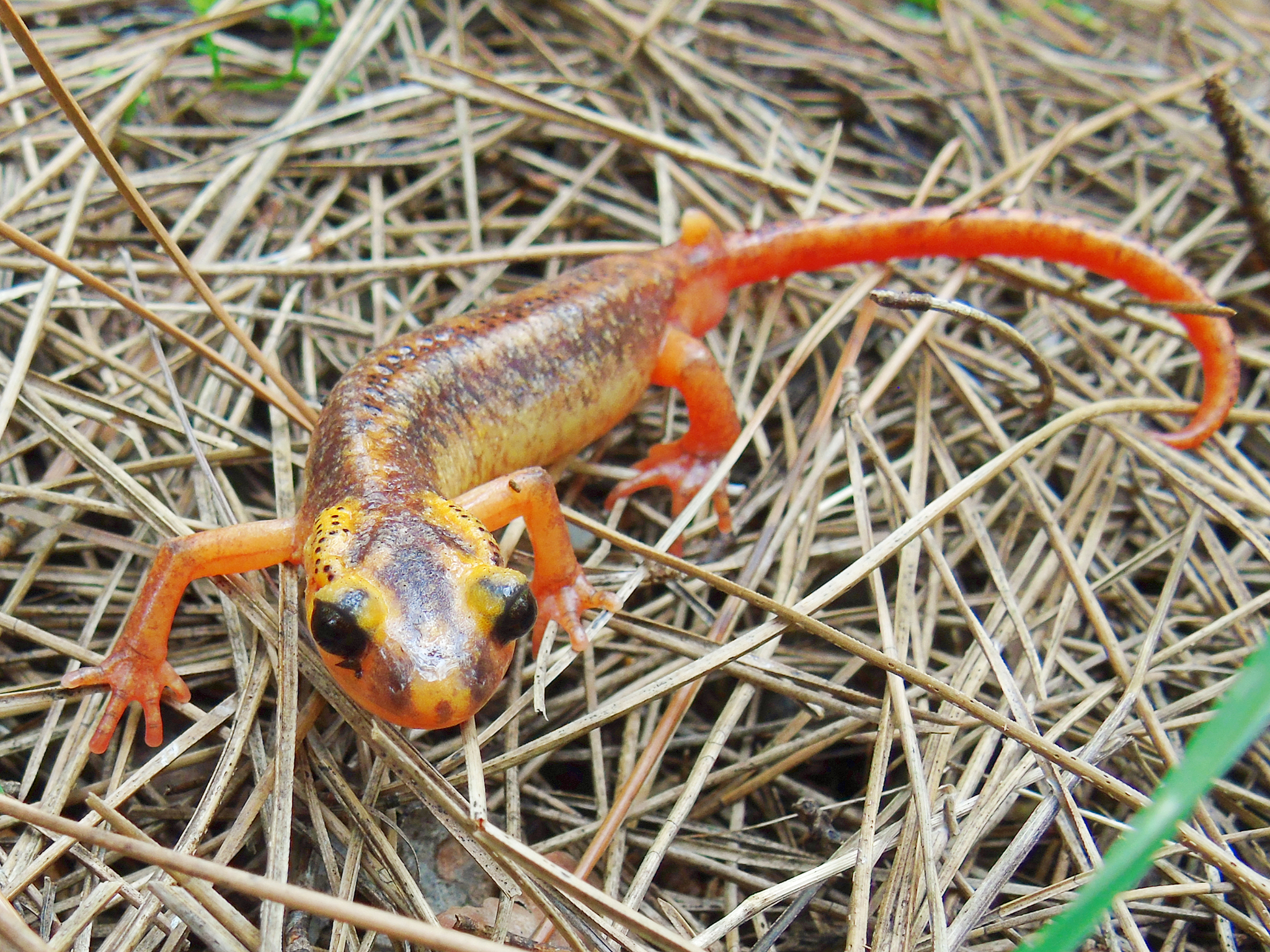

Conservation status
- Endangered (IUCN 3.1)

Scientific classification
- Domain: Eukaryota
- Kingdom: Animalia
- Phylum: Chordata
- Class: Amphibia
- Order: Urodela
- Family: Salamandridae
- Genus: Lyciasalamandra
- Species: L. antalyana

Binomial name
- Lyciasalamandra antalyana (Basoglu & Baran, 1976)

= Lyciasalamandra antalyana =

Species of amphibian

Lyciasalamandra antalyana, the Anatolia Lycian salamander, is a species of salamander in the family Salamandridae found only in Turkey. Its natural habitats are temperate forests, Mediterranean-type shrubby vegetation, and rocky areas. It is threatened by habitat loss.

== Description ==
The total length reaches 12-13.9 cm. There is a sexual dimorphism: females are larger than males. The head is flattened and elongated. There is a skin fold on the throat. Paratoids (glands) are visible on the back of the head.

== Habitat ==
It prefers temperate forests, scrubby and rocky places. Occurs at altitudes up to 100-650 m above sea level. It is active at night. It is most active in the cooler and wetter winter months, which are also the breeding season.
