= Kasos Massacre =

Massacre during the Greek War of Independence

Kasos massacre
- Part of the Massacres during the Greek War of Independence
Date	June 1824
Location	Kasos, Greece (Then Kaşot, Sanjak of Rhodes, Ottoman Empire) 35°24′N 26°55′E
Result	Capture of Kasos

Belligerents
Kasiots	Ottoman Egypt

Commanders and leaders
Unknown	Ismael Gibraltar; Djiritli Hüseyn Bey

Casualties and losses
500 dead, over 2,000 sold as slaves	30 killed and wounded
- Location of Kasos within Greece

The Kasos massacre was the massacre of Greek civilians in 1824 by Ottoman forces, during the Greek War of Independence.

== Kasos in the Greek War of Independence ==
At the outbreak of the Greek War of Independence, Kasos was semi-autonomous, some of its inhabitants had prospered by engaging in trade. It possessed a population of 7,000 people and a fleet of approximately 100 ships. With the onset of hostilities, the Kasiots began raiding the coasts of Anatolia, the Levant, and even Egypt. Under their elected admiral, Nikolaos Gioulios, they also often gave aid to the other Greek rebels in Crete, Samos, and elsewhere. As George Finlay reports, "It was said that the Kasiots usually murdered their captives at sea", especially since the island was barren and could with difficulty sustain its existing population. Apostolos Vakalopoulos also points out that control of Kasos was necessary for consolidating Ottoman–Egyptian control over rebellious Crete; strategically, Kasos was analogous with Samos and Psara as an advanced bulwark and base of operations for the Greek revolutionaries.

Already in June 1823, an Egyptian fleet commanded by Ismael Gibraltar disembarked 3,000 Albanian troops under Djiritli Hüseyn Bey at Crete. By spring 1824, Hüseyn Bey, by a judicious mixture of force and terror, combined with amnesty towards the Greek rebel leaders who were willing to submit, had managed to wipe out the Greek revolt in Crete. With Crete subdued, the Ottoman sultan, Mahmud II, and his semi-autonomous governor in Egypt, Muhammad Ali, turned their attention on Kasos and resolved to make an example of the island.

The Kasiots learned of their intentions, sending letters to the Provisional Administration of Greece to request aid, but the government replied that it was unable to mobilize the fleet for lack of money. The Egyptian fleet first appeared off the island on 2 June, launched an ineffectual bombardment, and made moves as if to land troops; as this was probably merely a reconnaissance mission, it soon departed. It was not until 18 June that the full 45 ships of the Egyptian fleet appeared off the island.

== Capture of Kasos and massacre ==
The island was not well fortified, apart from a few guns placed at the coast to cover the likely landing place. The Egyptian commanders furthermore contrived to deceive the islanders: after sailing past the island exchanging heavy artillery fire for two days with the defenders—on the 19th alone the Egyptians fired over 4,000 shots—the fleet moved towards the northern tip of the island. There it launched 18 great boats, pretending that it would make landing there, covered by much musket fire; while 24 boats with 1,500 Albanians landed behind the village of Agia Marina under cover of night on 19 June. The bulk of the population lived in the four mountainous villages around the main town, which were now between two hostile forces. Hüseyn Bey issued a call for surrender, rejecting requests for time to consider the proposal. Finally, the village elders chose to submit; this did not prevent Hüseyn Bey from executing many of them later. A number of Kasiots managed to escape by sailing to Karpathos.

The men who were posted on the shore batteries on the western side, under a certain Captain Markos, put up firmer resistance, but they too were overcome, as the Albanians, veterans of mountain warfare, used the cover provided by the higher ground to approach and defeat them, suffering only 30 killed and wounded in the process. Markos himself was captured and brought bound before Hüseyn Bey, where suddenly he managed to break his bonds, grab a knife from one of his guards, and kill three of them before he too was killed. The Albanians were given 24 hours to plunder at will; the Egyptian troops seized much plunder, as well as 15 larger and 40 smaller vessels, while three newly built ships and all the damaged ones were burned. After that, however, Ismael Gibraltar and Hüseyn Bey firmly restored order on the island, executing three Arabs who disobeyed orders to that effect.

Of the Kasiot men, 500 were slain, and over 2,000 women and children were captured; a small number was bought back by their relatives, while the rest were sent to the slave markets of Egypt and Crete. The Egyptian admiral managed to recruit a considerable number of survivors—as well as from the neighbouring islands of Karpathos and Symi—as sailors into his own fleet, offering a salary of 50 kuruş a month, before returning in triumph to Alexandria with his captured vessels, as well as fifteen elders and the families of the principal Kasiots as hostages.

== Aftermath ==
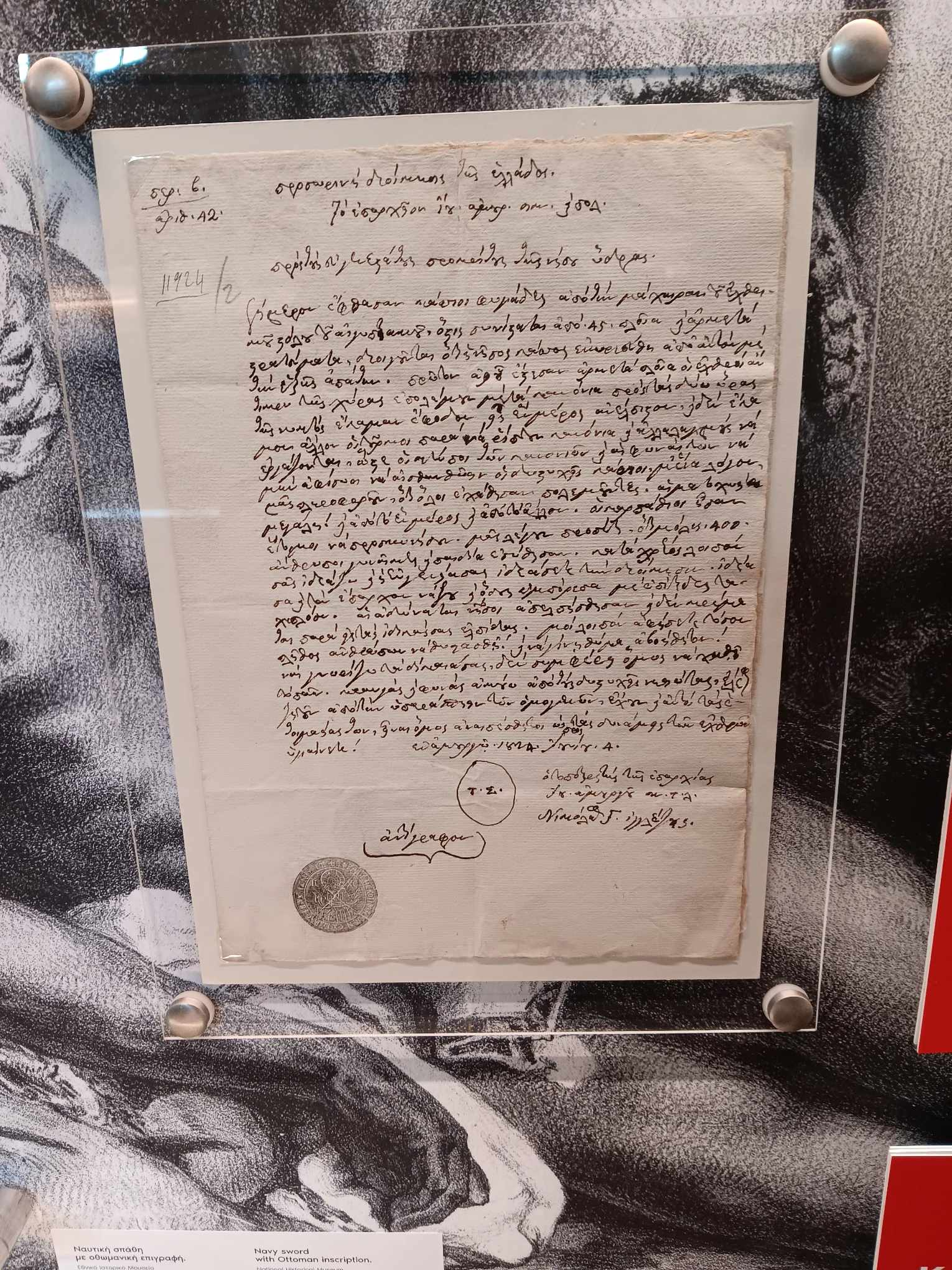
Letter written by Nikolaos Inglesis surveyor of Ios-Amorgos to the prefects of Hydra concerning the Kasos Massacre

News of the danger facing Kasos arrived at Hydra on the 21st, and the Greek fleet under Antonios Kriezis mobilized with much delay and difficulty, not arriving before the island until 2 July. Kriezis patrolled the waters between Karpathos and Rodos without encountering any hostile ships. The agha left as governor by Ismael Gibraltar fled the island to Karpathos, but the island was entirely destroyed; Vice Admiral Georgios Sachtouris and his captains proposed to the islanders to transport them to the Peloponnese, but the Kasiots refused, and the Greek fleet, receiving news that the main Ottoman fleet had set sail from Constantinople, was forced to leave the island. Indeed, the destruction of Kasos was followed soon after by another, heavier blow for the Greeks: the Destruction of Psara.

== See also ==
- List of massacres in Turkey
- Outline of Greek genocide

== Sources ==
- Finlay, George (1861). History of the Greek Revolution, Vol. II. Edinburgh and London: William Blackwood and Sons.
- Gordon, Thomas (1832). History of the Greek revolution, Volume II. Edinburgh and London: William Blackwood and T. Cadell.
- Orlandos, Anastasios (1869). Ναυτικά, ήτοι, Ιστορία των κατά τον υπέρ της ανεξαρτησίας της Ελλάδος αγώνα πεπραγμένων υπό των τριών ναυτικών νήσων (in Greek). Athens: Ch. N. Filadelfefs.
- Vakalopoulos, Apostolos E. (1982). Ιστορία του νέου ελληνισμού, Τόμος ΣΤ′: Η Μεγάλη Ελληνική Επανάσταση (1821–1829) - Η εσωτερική κρίση (1822–1825) [History of modern Hellenism, Volume VI: The Great Greek Revolution (1821–1829) - Internal Crisis (1822–1825)] (in Greek). Thessaloniki.
- Xiradaki, Koula (1995). Γυναίκες του 21 [Women of 21] (in Greek). Athens: Dodoni. ISBN 960-248-781-X. OCLC 37155066. OL 761940M.
