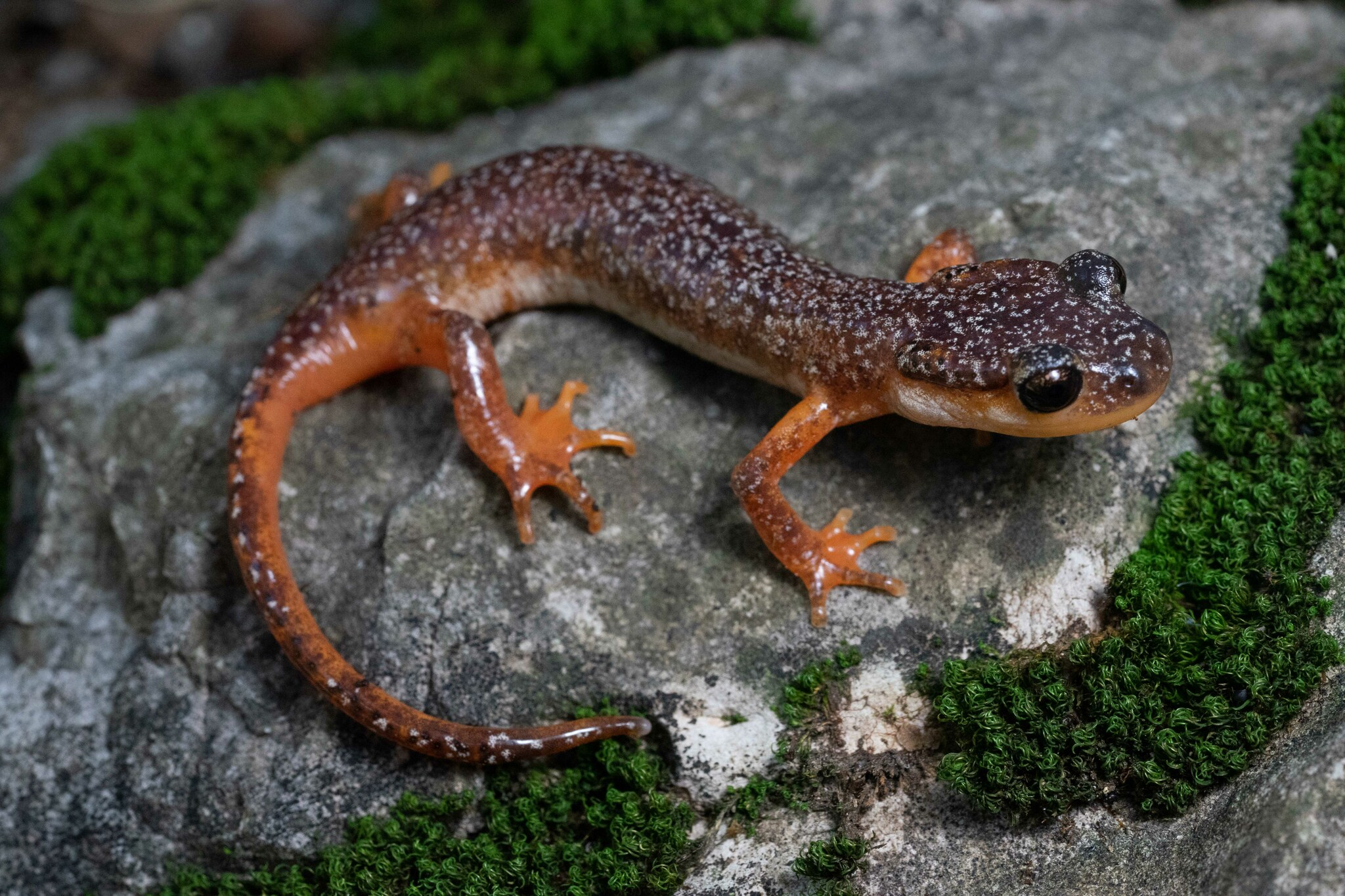

Conservation status
- Endangered (IUCN 3.1)

Scientific classification
- Kingdom: Animalia
- Phylum: Chordata
- Class: Amphibia
- Order: Urodela
- Family: Salamandridae
- Genus: Lyciasalamandra
- Species: L. billae

Binomial name
- Lyciasalamandra billae (Franzen & Klewen, 1987)

Synonyms
- Mertensiella luschani billae Franzen and Klewen, 1987; Lyciasalamandra irfani Göçmen, Arikan, and Yalçinkaya, 2011; Lyciasalamandra yehudahi Göçmen and Akman, 2012; Lyciasalamandra arikani Göçmen and Akman, 2012

= Lyciasalamandra billae =

Species of amphibian

Lyciasalamandra billae, the bay Lycian salamander, is a species of salamander in the family Salamandridae found only in Turkey. Its natural habitats are temperate forests and Mediterranean-type shrubby vegetation. It is threatened by habitat loss.
