= Poseidon Karpathos F.C. =

Poseidon Karpathos
- Full name: Athlitikos Syllogos Poseidon Karpathos
- Founded: 1946; 80 years ago
- Ground: Pigadia Ground
- Capacity: 500
- Chairman: Kosmas Giallourakis
- Manager: Giannis Karaminas
- League: Dodecanese FCA First Division
- 2025–26: Dodecanese FCA First Division, 9th
Home colours	Away colours

Poseidon Karpathos Football Club (Greek: Αθλητικός Σύλλογος Ποσειδών Καρπάθου) is a Greek football club based in Karpathos, Dodecanese. Founded in 1946, the club plays its home matches at the Pigadia Ground, in the capital of Karpathos. The club's traditional colors are blue and red.

== History ==
Poseidon Karpathos is the only official football club based on the island of Karpathos, representing the island in official league competitions. Founded in 1946, the club operates senior, youth, cadet, and junior academy squads. The emblem of the club features the island of Karpathos intersected by a trident, the symbol of Poseidon, the ancient god of the sea.

Among the club's greatest highlights are its five appearances at the top tier of Dodecanese amateur football, as well as the landmark 1981–82 season, which marked the club's inaugural participation in official competitions organized by the Dodecanese Football Clubs Association and the Hellenic Football Federation.

In 2026, Poseidon celebrated the 80th anniversary of its foundation, unveiling a new commemorative crest for the occasion. On 20 August 2026, the club announced the establishment of a "B" team to compete in the Third Division of the Dodecanese Football Clubs Association, aimed at developing young local talent from the island to bolster the senior squad.
