= Lyciasalamandra atifi =

Conservation status
- Endangered (IUCN 3.1)

Scientific classification
- Kingdom: Animalia
- Phylum: Chordata
- Class: Amphibia
- Order: Urodela
- Family: Salamandridae
- Genus: Lyciasalamandra
- Species: L. atifi

Binomial name
- Lyciasalamandra atifi (Basoglu, 1967)

Species of amphibian

Lyciasalamandra atifi, or Atif's salamander, is a species of salamander in the family Salamandridae found only in Turkey. Its natural habitats are temperate forests and rocky areas. It is threatened by habitat loss.
