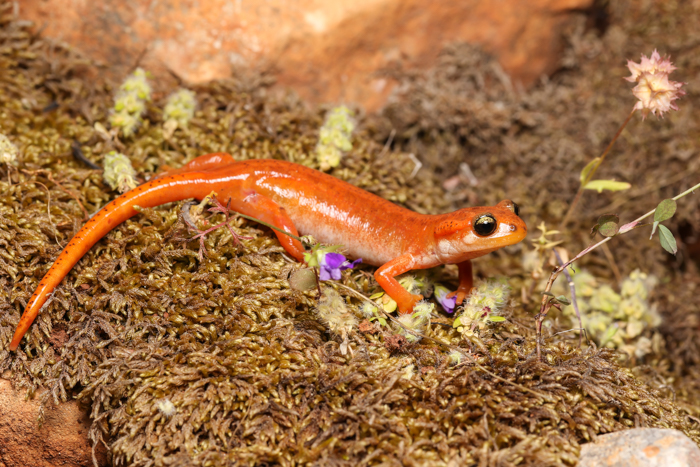

Conservation status
- Endangered (IUCN 3.1)

Scientific classification
- Kingdom: Animalia
- Phylum: Chordata
- Class: Amphibia
- Order: Urodela
- Family: Salamandridae
- Genus: Lyciasalamandra
- Species: L. luschani

Binomial name
- Lyciasalamandra luschani (Steindachner, 1891)

Synonyms
- Molge luschani Steindachner, 1891; Mertensiella luschani – Wolterstorff, 1925; Salamandra luschani – Arnold & Burton, 1978; Lyciasalamandra luschani – Veith & Steinfartz, 2004

= Luschan's salamander =

Species of amphibian

Luschan's salamander or Lycian salamander (Lyciasalamandra luschani) is a species of salamander in the family Salamandridae. It is found in the southwestern Anatolia in Turkey and adjacent Greece, in the island of Kastellorizo and its satellites.

== Description ==
Luschan's salamander is brown with small yellow dots dorsally, yellow or whitish laterally, and flesh-colored ventrally. The eyes and the narrow paratoid glands are prominent. Its tail is thin. Males have a protruding "spike" at the base of their tails on the dorsal surface. Adults may grow to 13 cm (5.1 in) in length. The Luschan's salamander is a nocturnal, land-dwelling animal, most active during the rainy or wet season, which lasts from November to April in the Mediterranean region. Males and females have similar weights.

Male and female L. luschani are sexually dimorphic. Males can be distinguished by a protuberance near the tail absent in both females and juvenile salamanders. The females, however, have a cloaca that can be used to determine their sex. Juvenile salamanders possess neither. One study has also shown that females tended to have a larger snout to vent length on average than males, but males had a significantly larger maximum snout-vent-length in comparison.

One population of the Lyciasalamandra luschani was found at the Dodurga village in southwestern Anatolia. The population was split into two types. Type 1 had a light brown dorsum, while type 2 had a light brown dorsum that is orangish. The other main differences can be seen in the upper eyelids such that they have a greenish light yellow color in type 2 salamanders. These eyelids also had a darker mid part. The type 2 specimens had dark brown spots all over them. Both type 1 and type 2 specimens have visible viscera, a wider posterior parotid gland, and an unpigmented ventral trunk. Males may sometimes exhibit a defensive posture with an arched back. It is worth noting that both type 1 and type 2 secretory adenoid glands can be found randomly distributed throughout the partoids.

== Subspecies ==
The three subspecies are:

- L. l. basoglui (Baran & Atatür, 1980)
- L. l. finikensis (Basoglu & Atatür, 1975)
- L. l. luschani (Steindachner, 1891)

== Genetics & phylogeny ==
At least eight subspecies of Mertensiella luschani have been described: M. l.billae, M. l. fazilae, M. l. luschani, M. l. atif, M. l. finikensis, M. l. flavimembris, M. l. antalyana, and M. l. basoglui. M. luschani overall was supported to be a well evidenced sister taxon to the Salamandra clade with a boot-strap of 100% and decay index of 41. Scientists also described that M. l. finikensis, M. l. luschani, and M. l. basoglui seem to form a monophyletic group with a bootstrap of 100% and a decay index of 15.

Scientists have also worked to categorize M. luschani into its appropriate phylogenetic positions based on different DNA sequences it possesses. A study on the 16,650 base pair nucleotide sequence of the salamander's mitochondrial DNA revealed that it has similar features to other vertebrate genomes. For example, the line of genetic code from the mitochondria produces 22 transfer RNAs, 2 ribosomal RNAs, and 13 peptides. The nucleic acid breakdown is the following: 15% guanine, 32% adenine, 29% thymine, and 24% cytosine. There are two non coding repeats of 124 base pairs that interrupt the typical vertebrate mitochondrial consensus genome sequence.

It has also been shown that the control region of this mitochondrial genome is 922 base pairs long. The origin of light strand replication has also been noted to form a secondary structure known as a stem-loop. The 16S and 12S ribosomal RNA genes are 1567 and 921 nucleotides in length. As with other genetic sequences, the majority of genes that produce proteins began with the ATG start codon. Exceptions to this include COI, ND3, and ND6. Based on genomic data and subsequent phylogenetic results, some scientists have argued that hagfish and lamprey should not be used as outgroup taxa.

=== Cytogenetic analyses ===
One analysis on genetic composition of the L. l. luschani subspecies showed hetermorphic nucleolus organizing regions. Surprisingly, these were all found on a single homolog of chromosome pairs. It was shown to have similar karytompes of 2n = 24 biarmed chromosomes. And this was consistent with other species in the Lyciasalamandra genus. In addition, the scientists had observed that there were solid C-bands near the centromere of the chromosomes. They had also seen heterochromatin on the telomeres as well.

== Habitat and distribution ==
L. luschani's natural habitats are temperate forests and arid Mediterranean environments. During active seasons, they live under shelters (i.e., rocks, wood) during the day, and at night, they forage. L. lushani populations are threatened by habitat loss. One of its subspecies, L. l. helverseni, is known to be found within a pine forest on the island of Carpathos. M. luschani has also been reported to inhabit about 350 kilometers of southwestern Turkish coast.

== Conservation ==
One source, the Red Data Book of Threatened Animals of Greece, classifies the salamander, particularly L. luschani basoglui, as vulnerable. Another source, the Red Data Book of the International Union for Conservation of Nature (IUCN) considers the salamander as an endangered species.

Concerns about Luschan's salamander conservation are rooted in 1) habitat loss due to development, and 2) subspecies isolation.

== Diet ==
When comparing adult and juvenile L. luschani basoglui salamanders, scientists found that there were statistically significant differences in the measurements of body length, body weight, snout to vent length, head width, mean prey length, and mean prey volume. This study showed that juvenile salamanders tended to have a diet heavily centered on collembolans and gastropods, whereas adult males tended to mostly eat beetles, and adult females mostly ate beetles and Hymenoptera. The researchers also discovered that L. l basoglui's snout-vent-length and the head with were significant predictors of both mean prey length and mean prey volume.

== Reproduction ==
Luschan's salamanders are viviparous. Females give birth to two offspring that are produced from each of the female's two oviducts. Gestation time ranges from 5–8 months.

Using 9 salamanders from the M.l. antalyna subspecies, scientists discovered the basic reproductive biology of M. luschani. The period for L. luschani birthing spans around two seasons, from the end of September to the end of March.

This partially due to the fact that a preferred humidity and temperature are desired before the salamander gives birth. Amplexus was observed frequently in April, suggesting that springtime may be its mating season.

== Development and life cycle ==
It has been discovered that soon after the metaphosphoric deposits of "periosteal parallel-fibred" bone can be found near the embryonic bone. L. l luschani may also have a rested growth period each year that tends to occur during the winter.

M. luschani achieve maturation at about 3 years old and are considered to be juveniles beforehand. Their life expectancy was shown to be about 5.4 years with some males living up to 8 years and some females living up to 10 years.

== Anatomy and morphology ==
M. luschani is said to have a flat and wide head. Its general trunk and body is orange with brown spots.

In one of the earliest papers describing the morphology of M. luschani, its anatomy was compared between two seemingly similar salamanders: Mertensiella caucasica and Salamandra salamandra. M. luschani's skull is larger than that of M. caucasica but similar in size to that of S. salamandra. M. luschani's skull also has two short premaxillae. Its jaw has been described to be somewhere in between the skull of Mertensiella caucasica and Salamandra salamandra. It has big nasal bones as well. The frontal bones of the skull have a pointed end on the side closest to the tail.

Lyciasalamander luschani basoglui has been described to have fairly rough skin, about 68 nanometers thick, that allows it to conserve water for extended time periods. The skin is mentioned to also have deep pits of 141 nanometers. It was found to have rougher skin than Salamndra salamandra. This suggests that L. l. basoglui has a slower rate of water vaporization through their skin than other salamanders.

Additionally, the salamander possesses one cervical vertebra, about sixteen trunk vertebrae, one sacral vertebra, three caudosacral vertebrae, and at least two dozen caudal vertebrae. The number of caudal vertebrae was as high as thirty in some species. The hips of M. luschani are said to be in between the size of M. caucasica and S. salamandra. Part of this pelvic girdle is made up of cartilage, but ossification starts centrally and then spreads laterally.

M. luschani has a stomach made up of the pylorus and fundus, like other salamanders. The stomach is composed of four layers: tunica serosa, tunica muscularis, submucosa, and tunica mucosa. The tunica mucosa can be further subdivided into the lamina muscularis, lamina propria, and lamina epitheliasis. As for the specific cell types present in each layer, the mucous layer has simple columnar epithelium. Vasculature as well as collagen can be found in the submucosa layer. Glands found in the pylorus appear to be branched and tubular, while glands in the fundus are of a simple tubular form.

The small intestine is made up of similar layers and lacks the muscularis mucosa layer. Goblet cells are present within the pseudostratified ciliated epithelium in the mucous membrane of the intestine. The small intestine is also made up of folds called villi. The study that characterized this also found that M. luschani had significantly greater lamina epitheliasis thickness and lumen area compared to the intestines of the Southern crested newt, Triturus karelinii.

== Physiology ==
Scientists have determined that the liver esterases present in M. l. luschani are all carboxylesterases. Since the esterases were all inhibited by diisopropyl fluorophosphate (DFP), it was clear that such esterases were present. They also appeared to be stable in higher temperatures up to 45 degrees Celsius. There were around ten molecular forms of esterases present based on isoelectric focusing and gel electrophoresis. The main two molecular weights seen were typically 70,000 and 230,000

== Parasites ==
Lyciasasalamandra luschani, also known as Mertensiella luschani, has been shown to be a parasitic host for certain nematodes or helminths. Angiostoma aspersae have been found in certain salamander carcasses. Of the salamanders observed, about 92 percent of them had this nematode infecting their bodies.
