= Karpathos-Kasos =

Karpathos-Kasos Περιφερειακή Ενότητα Καρπάθου - Ηρωϊκής Νήσου Κάσου
- Regional unit
- Municipalities of the Dodecanese

- Karpathos-Kasos within Greece

- Location within Greece
- Coordinates: 35°30′N 27°10′E
- Country: Greece
- Administrative region: South Aegean

Area
  - Total: 374.3 km^{2} (144.5 sq mi)

Population (2021)
  - Total: 7,790
  - Density: 20.8/km^{2} (53.9/sq mi)
- Time zone: UTC+2 (EET)
  - Summer (DST): UTC+3 (EEST)

Karpathos-Kasos (Greek: Περιφερειακή Ενότητα Καρπάθου - Ηρωϊκής Νήσου Κάσου, literally: "Regional Unit of Karpathos - Heroic Island of Kasos") is one of the regional units of Greece. It is part of the region of South Aegean. The regional unit covers the islands of Karpathos, Kasos, Saria and several smaller islands in the Aegean Sea.

== Administration ==
As a part of the 2011 Kallikratis government reform, the regional unit Karpathos was created out of part of the former Dodecanese Prefecture. It was renamed to Karpathos-Kasos in 2017. It is subdivided into 2 municipalities. These are (number as in the map in the infobox):

- Karpathos (5)
- Kasos (6)

== Province ==
The province of Karpathos (Greek: Επαρχία Καρπάθου) was one of the provinces of the Dodecanese Prefecture. It had the same territory as the present regional unit. It was abolished in 2006.
