= Kasos =

Island of Greece

Κάσος Kasos
- Municipality
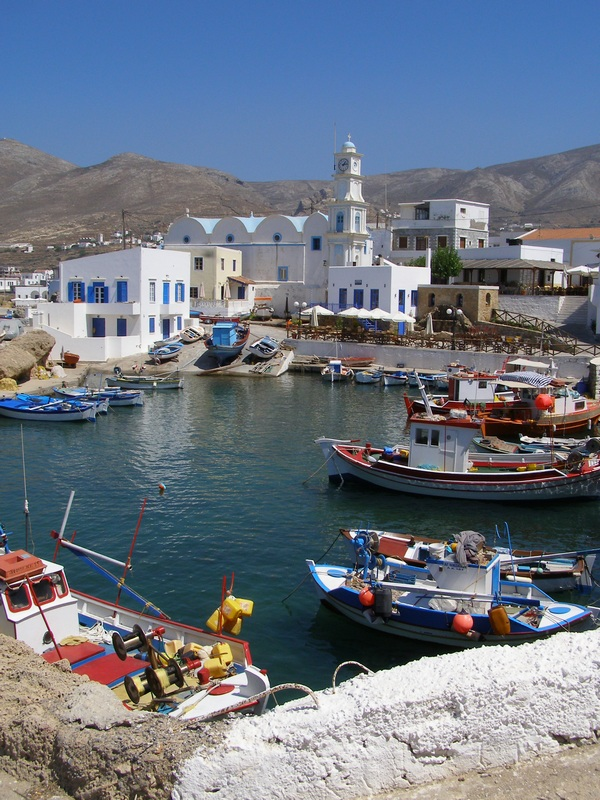
- Old Harbor of Fri

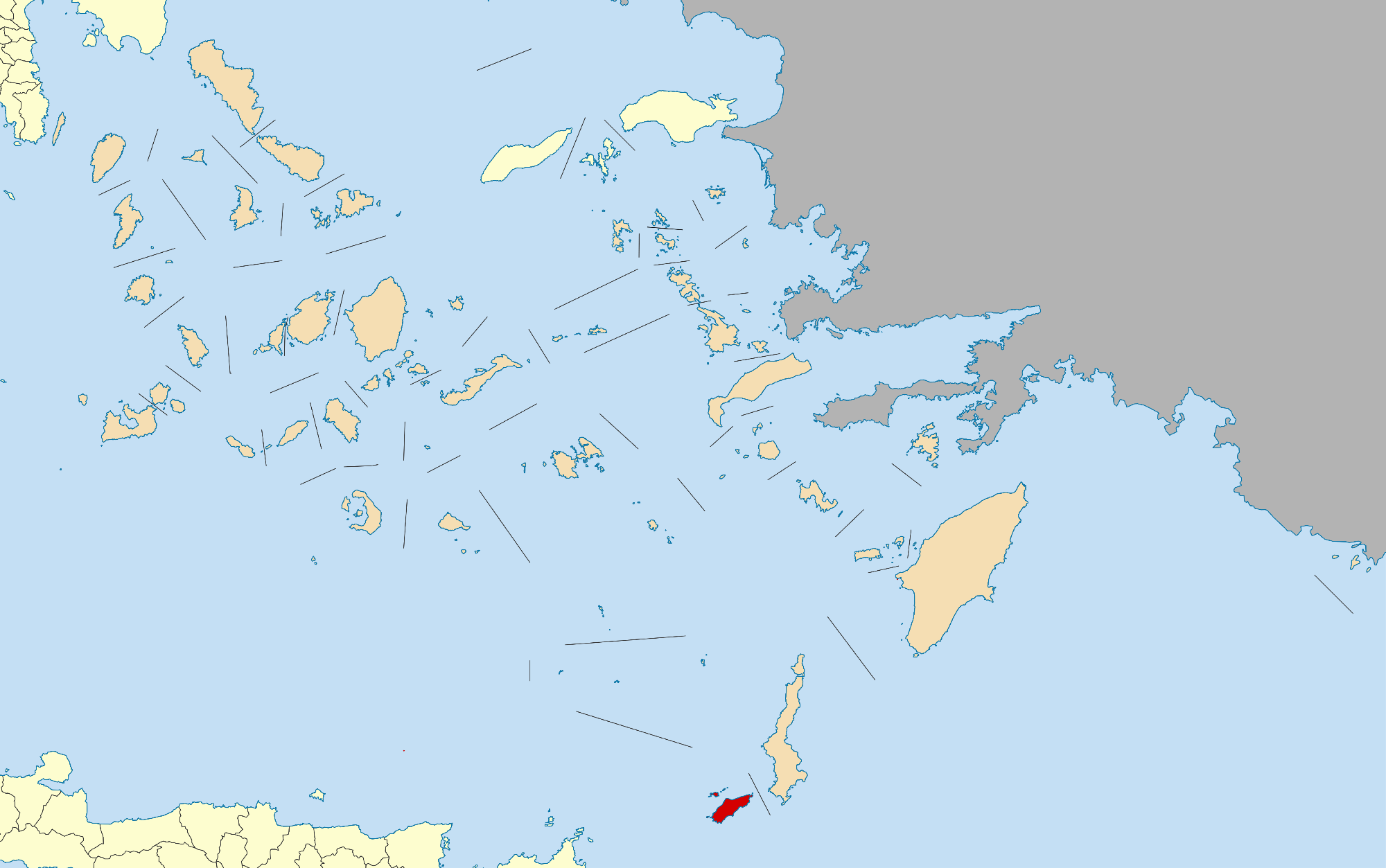

- Location within Greece
- Coordinates: 35°23′51″N 26°55′30″E
- Country: Greece
- Administrative region: South Aegean
- Regional unit: Karpathos-Kasos
- Seat: Fri

Area
  - Municipality: 69.464 km^{2} (26.820 sq mi)
- Highest elevation: 550 m (1,800 ft)
- Lowest elevation: 0 m (0 ft)

Population (2021)
  - Municipality: 1,223
  - Density: 17.61/km^{2} (45.60/sq mi)
- Demonym: Kasiot
- Time zone: UTC+2 (EET)
  - Summer (DST): UTC+3 (EEST)
- Postal code: 85800
- Area code: 22450
- Vehicle registration: ΚΧ, ΡΟ, ΡΚ
- Website: www.kasos.gr

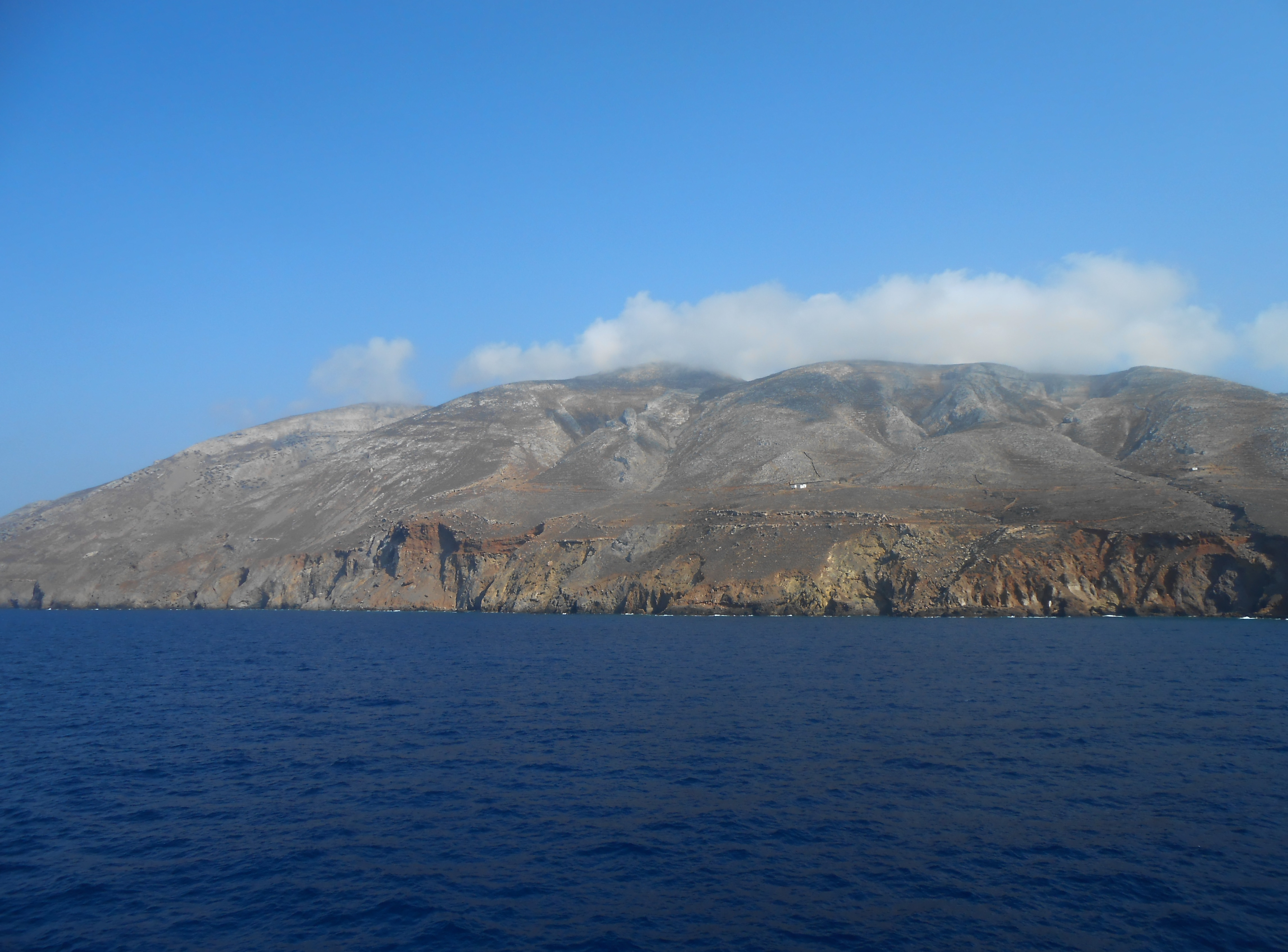
Kasos Island

Kasos (/ˈkɑːsoʊs/; Greek: Κάσος, pronounced [ˈka̠so̞s]), also Casos, is a Greek island municipality in the Dodecanese. It is part of the regional unit Karpathos-Kasos. The capital of the island is Fri. As of 2021, its population was 1,223.

== Names ==
There are several references to the island in the works of ancient authors, including as Amphe (Ἄμφη), Astrabe (Άστράβη), and Achni (Άχνη). Concerning Kasos (Κάσος), Samuel Bochart (1674) and Victor Bérard (1902) suggested that it could derive from the Canaanite word kas 'foam', and that it is a doublet with Greek Achni (Άχνη). The island is also known in Italian as Caso and in Turkish as Kaşut or Çoban (چوبان). Since 2018, the municipality is officially named the Heroic Island of Kasos (Ηρωική Νήσος Κάσου), in recognition of the Kasos Massacre in 1824 during the Greek War of Independence.

== Geography ==
Kasos lies southwest of Karpathos, and east of Crete. The island lies within the subtropical zone, being at 35ºN latitude. Adjacent to the island is the Strait of Kasos, through which some of the Modified Atlantic Water enters the Sea of Crete. Its shape is elliptic and resembles that of Rhodes. The main island has a surface of 49 square kilometres (19 sq mi), being 17 km (11 mi) long and 6 km (4 mi) across at its widest. It is very mountainous, with its highest mount being Mt. Prionas, which is 550 metres (1,800 feet) high. There is fresh water on the island. Lawrence Durrell is rather disparaging about the island, begrudging it a mere 22 words in a brief comparison to Karpathos, calling it a "smaller, stonier version of the same sort of thing."

The Florentine monk and geographer Christoforo Buondelmonti, around 1415, explored Karpathos and makes a reference to seeing Kasos in the distance. His map of Karpathos seems to include a schematic view of Kasos to the west. In 1687, the English merchant Bernard Randolph referred to the island as Cassio or Casos, and wrote the following about it:

Tho 'tis but a small Island, yet it abounds in all things necessary for life. The middle of the Island is almost a plain, well planted with Olive trees, and Vine-yards; with all sorts of Fruits. To the West are five small Islands, amongst which is very good riding for ships. These Islanders have obtained a great favour from the Port, by means of a Favorite of Solyman the Magnificent, who obtained a Command, that none of the tribute-Masters should molest them, they shewing a discharge, for 1000 dollars yearly to be paid at Constantinople for all taxes. Yet are they but poor, (or at least pretend so) Here is a Monastery of Candiotes, who came from the City of Settia, when that City was destroyed; They live here very well, and have the enjoyment of their possessions on the Island of Candia, paying only the tenths to the Turks.

A bona fide early tourist to leave an engaging description of the island's interior and inhabitants was the Orientalist, pioneer of Egyptology, and translator of the Quran, Claude-Étienne Savary; while on his way to Crete in late 1779, bad weather made him remain several days on the island. His account is made more poignant, depicting as it does a harmonious setting just forty years before the Ottoman devastation of 1824. The French naturalist Charles Sigisbert Sonnini, visiting a few years after Savary, at the end of the 18th century, commented on the "very good wine" and "the honey which they gather [being] still, as in ancient times, abundant, and of excellent quality".

In 1888, the Austro-Polish geologist Gejza Edler Bukowski von Stolzenburg (1858–1937), was on the island to conduct a geological survey. He writes (translated from the German): "A few days were enough to get an overview of the geological construction of this small island..." His results were published in 1890 in Vienna, along with a map.

The Municipality of Kasos (Δήμος Κάσου) includes several uninhabited offshore islands, the largest of which are Armathia and Makronisi. Its total land area is 69.464 square kilometres (26.820 sq mi).

The island has five villages, Fri (pronounced like "free", pop. 357), Agia Marina (444), Panagia (34), Poli (80), and Arvanitochori (169). Fri is the capital and home to the island's harbor and Agia Marina is the most populous village. The airport is located close to Fri and is big enough for an ATR 42 to land.

In the early 1950s, the English travel-writer Robert Liddell visited the island for the memorial of the 1824 holocaust, that takes place every June. He wrote that "[t]he best things about Phry are its odd, little name (short for Ophrys), and the magnificent outline of Cárpathos seen in the east."

=== Climate ===
Kasos has a hot semi-arid climate (Köppen climate classification: BSh). According to the data of the National Observatory of Athens and the Hellenic National Meteorological Service stations, Kasos records the mildest winters in Greece, with a record low temperature of 2.7 °C (for the period 1989–2026). It is also the second driest area of Greece after Schoinoussa. Kasos falls in 11a hardiness zone.

Climate data for Fri 4 m a.s.l.
| Month | Jan | Feb | Mar | Apr | May | Jun | Jul | Aug | Sep | Oct | Nov | Dec | Year |
|---|---|---|---|---|---|---|---|---|---|---|---|---|---|
| Record high °C (°F) | 22.5 (72.5) | 25.2 (77.4) | 25.8 (78.4) | 30.5 (86.9) | 36.7 (98.1) | 37.2 (99.0) | 35.7 (96.3) | 36.9 (98.4) | 35.7 (96.3) | 32.8 (91.0) | 27.4 (81.3) | 24.4 (75.9) | 37.2 (99.0) |
| Mean daily maximum °C (°F) | 16.2 (61.2) | 16.3 (61.3) | 17.5 (63.5) | 19.9 (67.8) | 23.4 (74.1) | 26.2 (79.2) | 28.2 (82.8) | 28.3 (82.9) | 26.8 (80.2) | 23.8 (74.8) | 20.9 (69.6) | 17.9 (64.2) | 22.1 (71.8) |
| Daily mean °C (°F) | 14.1 (57.4) | 14.1 (57.4) | 15.2 (59.4) | 17.3 (63.1) | 20.7 (69.3) | 24.0 (75.2) | 26.2 (79.2) | 26.6 (79.9) | 25.0 (77.0) | 21.8 (71.2) | 18.9 (66.0) | 15.8 (60.4) | 20.0 (68.0) |
| Mean daily minimum °C (°F) | 11.9 (53.4) | 12.0 (53.6) | 12.8 (55.0) | 14.6 (58.3) | 18.0 (64.4) | 21.8 (71.2) | 24.2 (75.6) | 24.9 (76.8) | 23.2 (73.8) | 19.9 (67.8) | 16.8 (62.2) | 13.8 (56.8) | 17.8 (64.1) |
| Record low °C (°F) | 2.7 (36.9) | 4.3 (39.7) | 5.2 (41.4) | 7.2 (45.0) | 13.6 (56.5) | 16.2 (61.2) | 20.4 (68.7) | 21.1 (70.0) | 17.6 (63.7) | 14.4 (57.9) | 11.1 (52.0) | 6.3 (43.3) | 2.7 (36.9) |
| Average rainfall mm (inches) | 54.8 (2.16) | 31.0 (1.22) | 35.7 (1.41) | 12.0 (0.47) | 9.1 (0.36) | 1.7 (0.07) | 0.9 (0.04) | 0.3 (0.01) | 3.3 (0.13) | 20.7 (0.81) | 26.9 (1.06) | 53.4 (2.10) | 249.8 (9.84) |
Source 1: Karpathiakanea.gr
Source 2: National Observatory of Athens Monthly Bulletins (Jul 2010 – Jan 2026) and World Meteorological Organization

== History ==
From the apparent derivation of the name, it would seem that the island was known to Phoenician traders, who might have sought shelter there, although no evidence has come to light. The first known settlements are Minoan and Mycenaean in origin. According to Homer (Iliad, 2.676), Kasos contributed ships toward the Trojan War. During Classical Antiquity it closely followed the history of nearby Karpathos. It was a member of the Delian League.

After a short period in the hands of the Knights of St John, Kasos was governed by the Venetian Cornaro family from 1306, before falling to Barbarossa and the Ottomans in 1537. The whereabouts of the Venetian administrative centre are not recorded; there are considerable structural remains in and around the Byzantine area of Panagia, with its picturesque group of early chapels known as "Six Churches" (Έξι Εκκλησίες). In 1912, Frederick W. Hasluck discovered a collection of medieval coins in Smyrna, that are believed to have been concealed on the island of Kasos around 1370; they are now known as the "Kasos Hoard".

Kasos took part in the Greek Revolution and supported the cause with its fleet. In 1824, Mehmet Ali Pasha of Egypt, furious with the Kasiots, dispatched his fleet to the island, where the Egyptian armada plundered the island, killed 500 people and enslaved 2000, an event described as the Kasos massacre.

The island's population recovered as did its economy, still largely based on shipping. The introduction of steam ships made Kasos' shipyard (which produced wooden sailing ships) redundant and its economy suffered accordingly. Beginning in the later half of the 19th century, many emigrated from Kasos, initially to Egypt (about 5,000 people), then to Istanbul, Greece, USA and South Africa. By the 1920s, out of about 2,300 houses on the island, only 400 were permanently inhabited.

On 12 May 1912, during the Italo-Turkish War of 1911–1912, after the so-called "Battle of Cassos" which took place on 29 January 1912, the island was occupied by the sailors of the Regia Marina ship Regina Elena. With the 1923 Treaty of Lausanne, Kasos joined the other islands of the Dodecanese in the Italian possession of the Italian Aegean Islands.

In March 1935 the Greek naval warship Averof evacuated Eleftherios Venizelos from Helatros beach, where today a commemorative bust marks the statesman's failed coup attempt and subsequent exile and death in Paris the following year.

As the Second World War unfolded in the Aegean, in the spring of 1941 a small band of British special operatives based on Crete planned a raid on Kasos to assess the strength of the Italian garrison. On 20 May, the raiding party, including John Pendlebury, and their vessel, H.M.S. Dolphin, an armed caique, got as far as the islet of Elasa, some 50 km east of Kasos, before they were forced to abort their mission by German fighter aircraft. Crete fell to the Germans a few days later. In September 1943, after the armistice with the Anglo-Americans, the Italians lost control of the Dodecanese for the rest of the war to Nazi Germany, which already occupied almost all of Greece: although defended by a small Italian garrison, Kasos was lost to the Germans on the 18th of that month, remaining under German occupation until the summer of 1945.

Dr. Raymond Mills records being the medical officer on Kasos at the end of the war in charge of 3000 Greek and Italian refugees, who had escaped from the German occupation of the three islands of Rhodes, Kos and Leros; these men were repatriated later in 1945.

Kasos was ceded by Italy to Greece with the Paris Peace Treaties of 1947. The island formally joined the Kingdom of Greece on 7 March 1948 together with the other Dodecanese islands.

== Archaeology ==
The Kasos Archaeological Museum, curated in Fri's original demarcheion, includes material from all periods of the island's history: Prehistoric to Early Christian times; exhibits linked to the 1821 Greek War of Independence, and the Kasos Massacre of 1824; and artefacts related to local history and folklore.

The Ellinokamara site outside Agia Marina, with remains from prehistory to Byzantine times, has been extensively investigated. The site first reached the attention of Western scholarship in 1845 as a result of a visit in September 1843 by the German classical archaeologist Ludwig Ross. In 1879, Pierre-Marie-Mondry Beaudouin recorded several inscriptions, carefully identifying their findspots.

The Bronze Age and later acropolis of Poli has a few vestiges of early defensive walling. The associated cemeteries featured some burials with unique, inscribed lenticular discs, mainly from the 4th and 3rd centuries BC, some of which are on display in Fri's museum. One of them, immortalizing one Αυσίδαμος (Avsidamos), was acquired by Charles Thomas Newton in the mid-1850s and given to the British Museum.

In 2019, archaeologists discovered a number of shipwrecks dating from several different historical periods. Scientists have also found evidence that points towards an ancient port facility. The investigations in the area continued in January 2021, and the scientists revealed four further wrecks, dating back to the Greek, Roman and Byzantine eras; one was a 2,000-year-old Roman ship with amphorae. Archaeologists also found iron cannons, pottery and some random objects.

== Natural history ==
Early identification of some of the botanical species of the island was undertaken in a brief visit by Charles Forsyth Major in 1886 and published in 1894. More recently (2021), scientists Cristina Cattaneo and Mauro Grano undertook an updated floristic and ecological analysis.

In 1993, an account was published of the discovery on the island of a slug described as "obviously an endemic species of Kasos island".

A dead specimen of the grass snake Natrix natrix (Linnaeus, 1758) (Squamata, Serpentes) was found on the island by Mauro Grano and Cristina Cattaneo in August 2019, representing a new record for the island. They write in their paper that the island's "position, geological history, small size and extreme aridity lead to a rather poor herpetofauna containing one amphibian... and six reptiles". The amphibian is the Karpathos salamander, a threatened species that is only found in three islands, one of which is Kasos.

The molar tooth of a dwarf elephant has been discovered on the island, of probable Late Pleistocene age. It is very similar to that of the Asian elephant-sized Palaeoloxodon creutzburgi from nearby Crete. Remains of deer, probably representing an extinct endemic species, have also been reported from Pleistocene deposits on the island.

In 2021, researchers published the first identification on the island of the lesser shrew (Crocidura suaveolens).

== Notable residents ==
- Dimitrios Antoniou (1906–1994), poet, better known by his pen name D. I. Antoniou (Greek: Δ.Ι. Αντωνίου).
- Kassia (revered in the Eastern Orthodox Church as St. Kassiane), a Byzantine abbess, poet, composer, and hymnographer.
- Antoine Malliarakis Mayo (French/Greek, 1905–1990) surrealist artist, born in Port Said, the son of an engineer from Kasos. The surname is shared with that of the hero of the 1824 massacre.
- Nikolaos G. Mavris (1899–1978), physician, regional administrator, philanthropist, author, folklorist. The Municipal Library in Fri was his foundation. His papers are archived in the American School of Classical Studies at Athens.

== See also ==
- Kasos Massacre

== Sources ==
- Bertarelli, L.V. (1929). Guida d'Italia, Vol. XVII. Consociazione Turistica Italiana, Milano..
