= Karpathos =

Greek island in the Aegean Sea

Karpathos Κάρπαθος
- Municipality
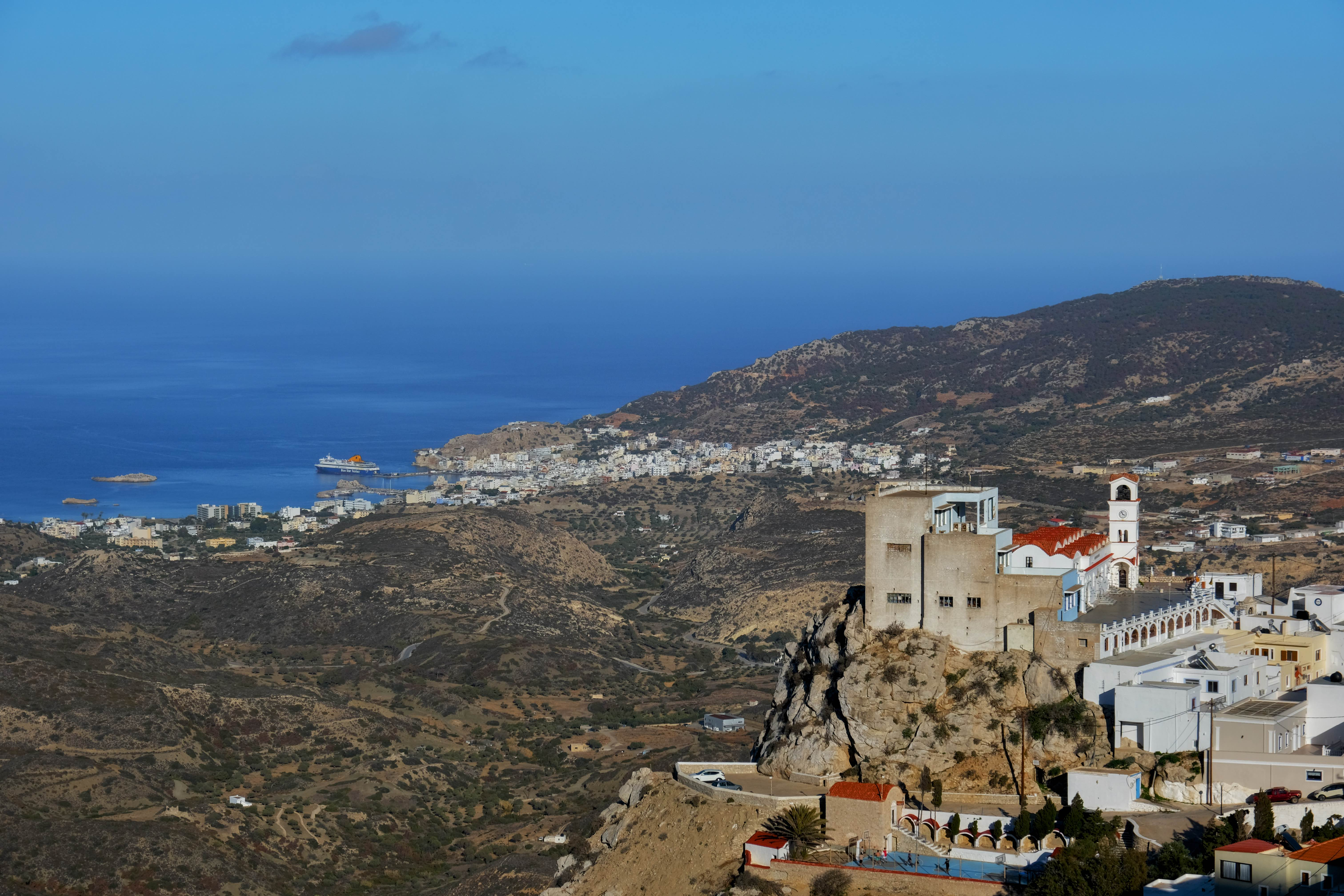
- View of Menetes and Pigadia

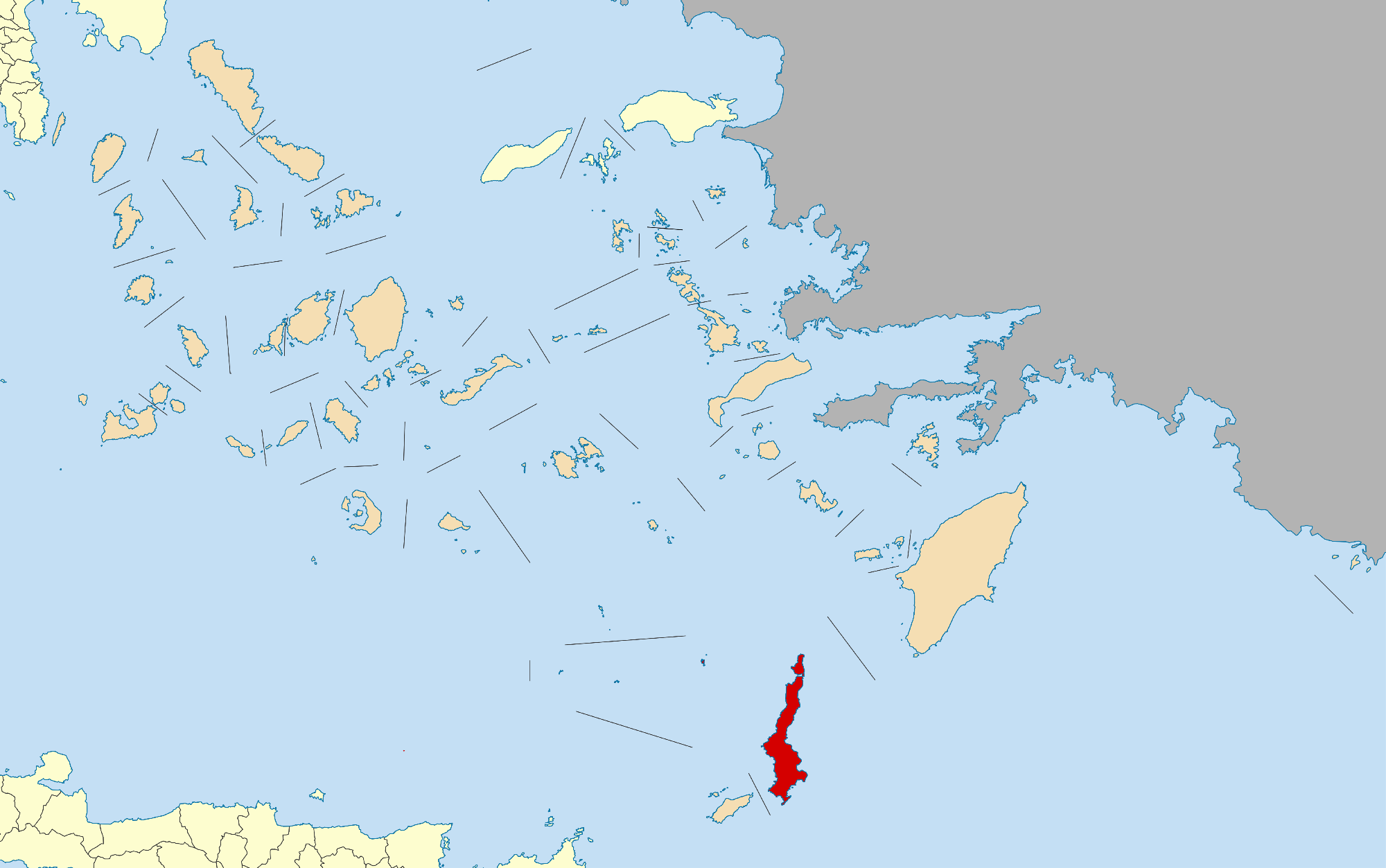

- Location within Greece
- Coordinates: 35°35′N 27°08′E
- Country: Greece
- Administrative region: South Aegean
- Regional unit: Karpathos-Kasos

Area
  - Municipality: 324.8 km^{2} (125.4 sq mi)
  - Municipal unit: 219.9 km^{2} (84.9 sq mi)
- Highest elevation: 1,215 m (3,986 ft)
- Lowest elevation: 0 m (0 ft)

Population (2021)
  - Municipality: 6,567
  - Density: 20.22/km^{2} (52.37/sq mi)
  - Municipal unit: 6,037
  - Municipal unit density: 27.45/km^{2} (71.10/sq mi)
  - Community: 3,047
- Time zone: UTC+2 (EET)
  - Summer (DST): UTC+3 (EEST)
- Postal code: 857 00
- Area code: +030 22450
- Vehicle registration: ΚΧ, ΡΟ, ΡΚ
- Website: karpathos.gr

Karpathos (Greek: Κάρπαθος, pronounced [ˈkarpaθos]), also Carpathos, is the second largest of the Greek Dodecanese islands, in the southeastern Aegean Sea. Together with the neighboring smaller Saria Island it forms the municipality of Karpathos, which is part of the regional unit Karpathos-Kasos. Because of its remote location, Karpathos has preserved many peculiarities of dress, customs and dialect, the last resembling those of Crete and Cyprus. The island has also been called Carpathus in Latin and Scàrpanto in Italian.

== Etymology ==
Homer calls the island Krapathos, with metathesis of two letters in the first syllable. Other names of the island include Tetrapolis and Anemoessa.

== Municipality ==
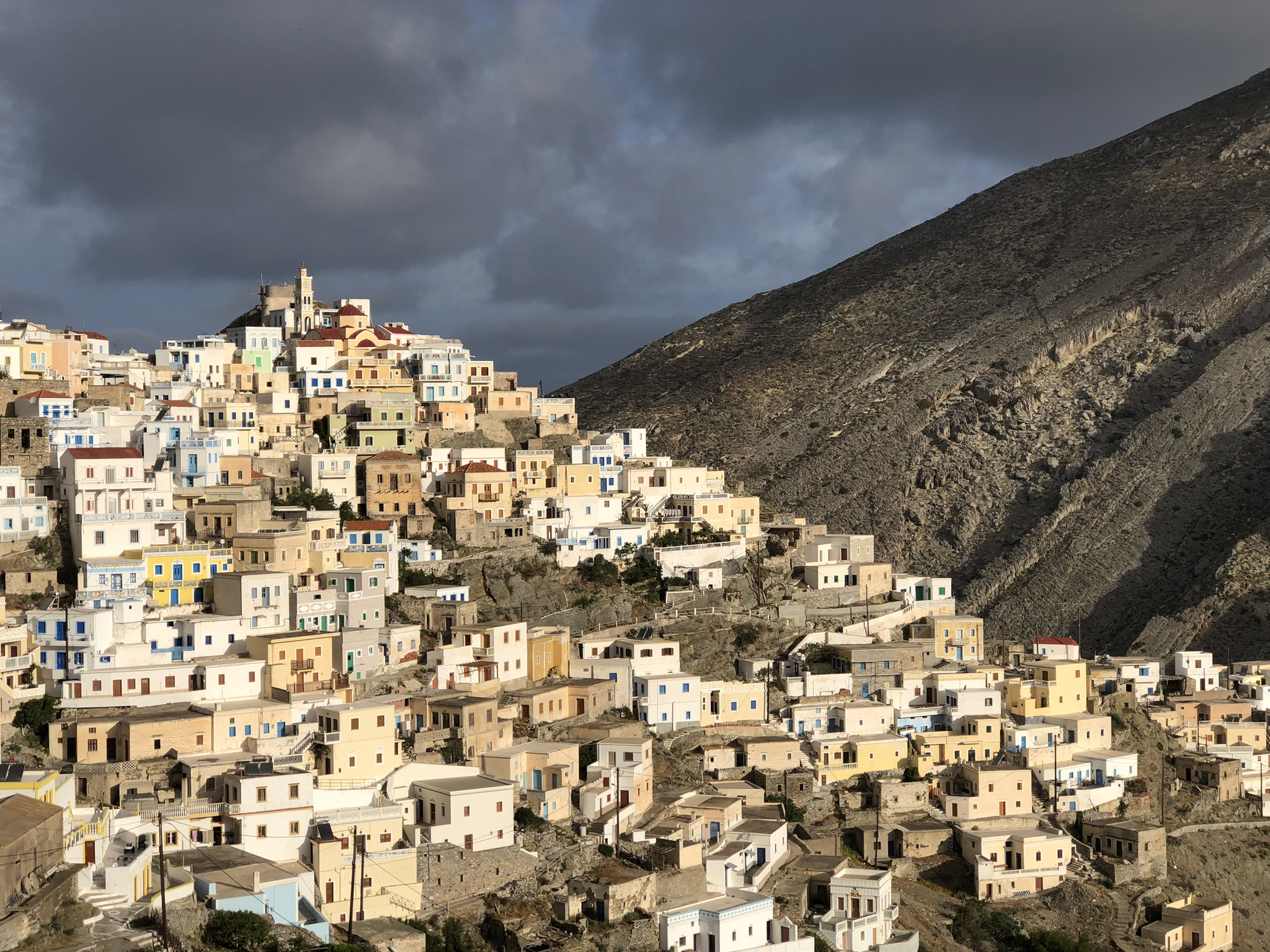
The community of Olympos

The present municipality of Karpathos was formed at the 2011 local government reform, by the merger of the following two former municipalities, that became municipal units:

- Karpathos
- Olympos

The municipality has an area of 324.800 km^{2}, and the municipal unit spans 219.924 km^{2}.

== Mythology ==
Karpathos is the mythological homeland of the Titan Iapetus, and the birthplace of the prophetic sea god and son of Poseidon, Proteus.

== History ==
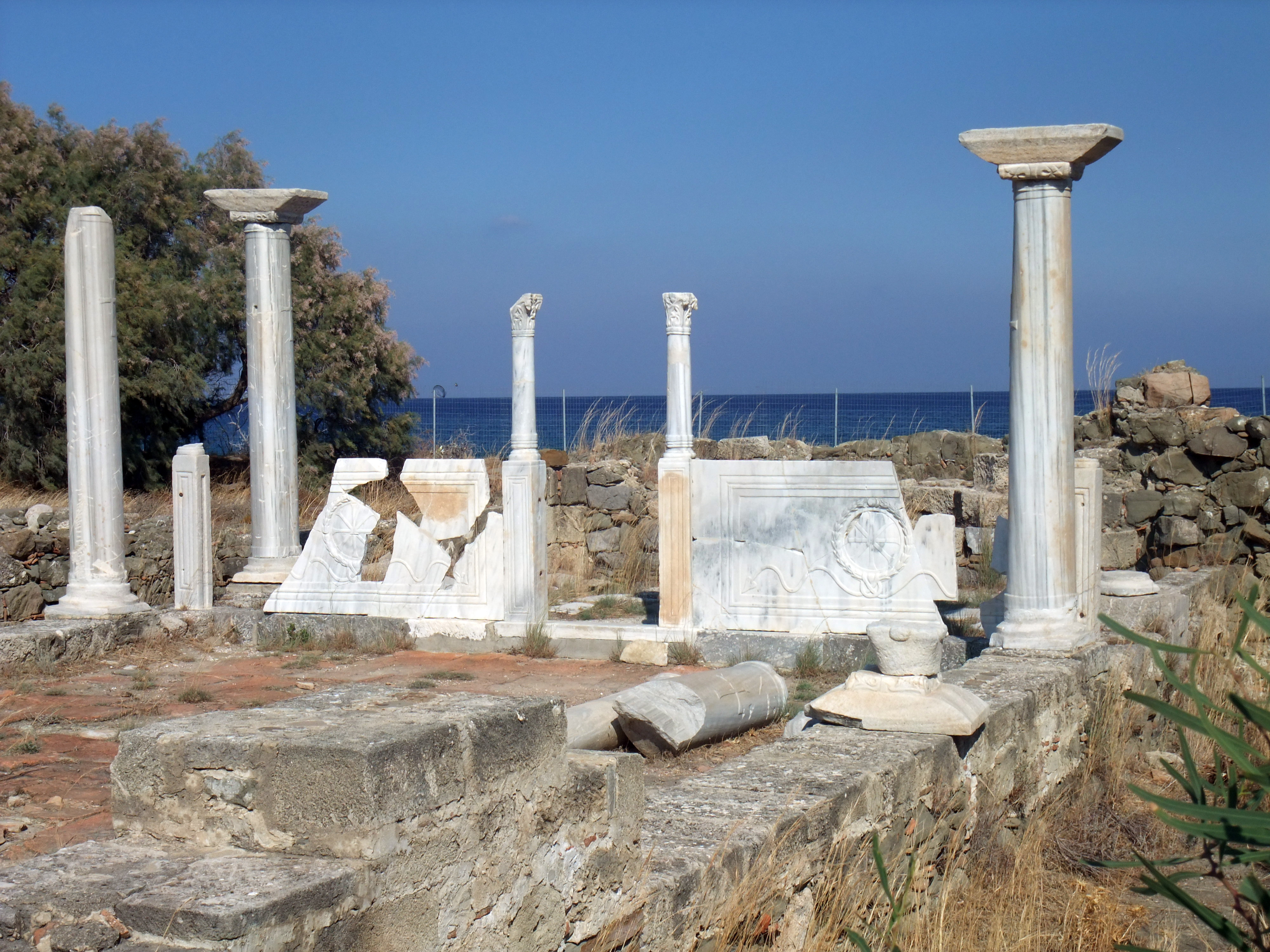
Remains of the early Christian basilica of St Fotini, Pigadia

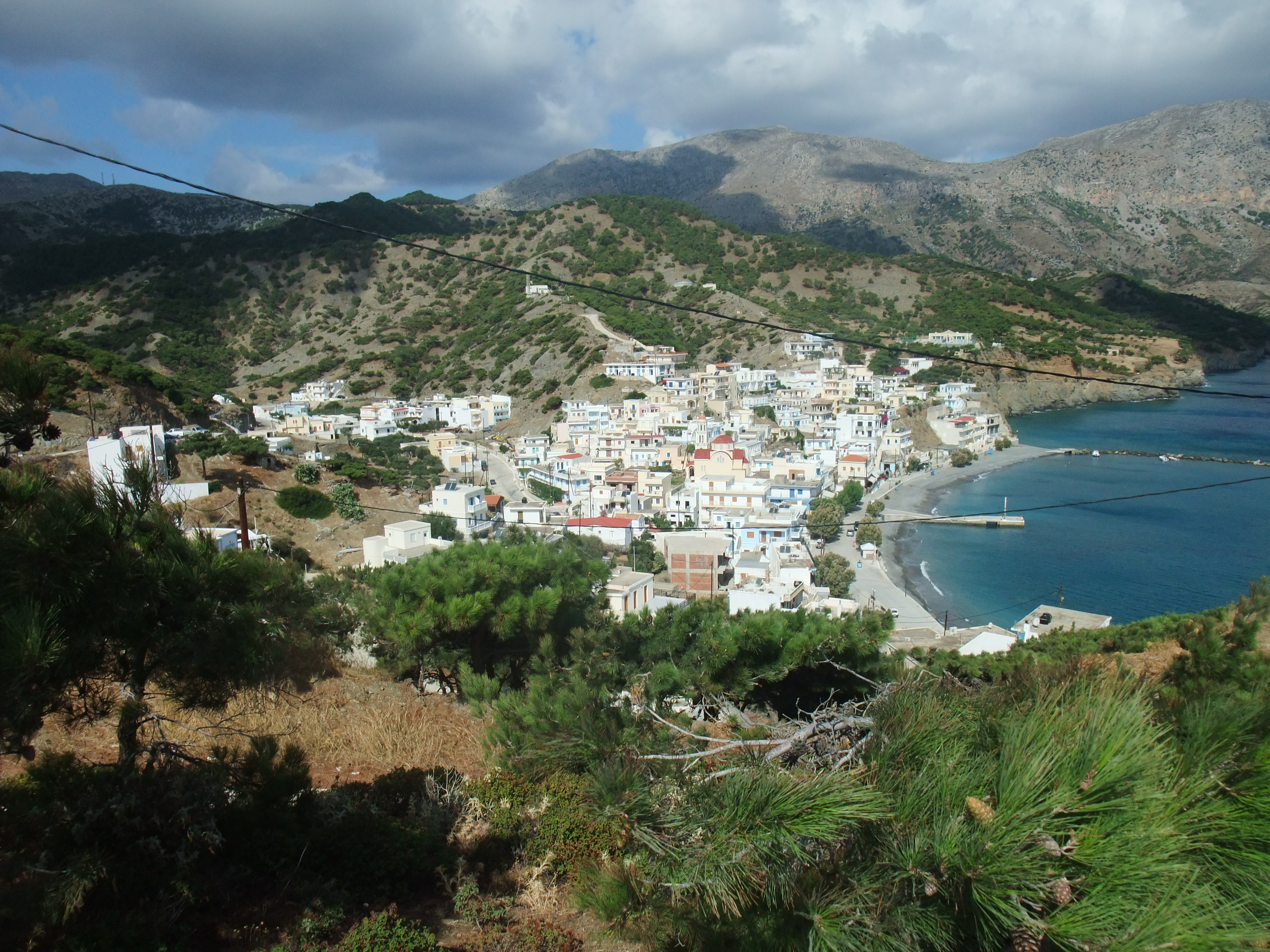
Diafáni village

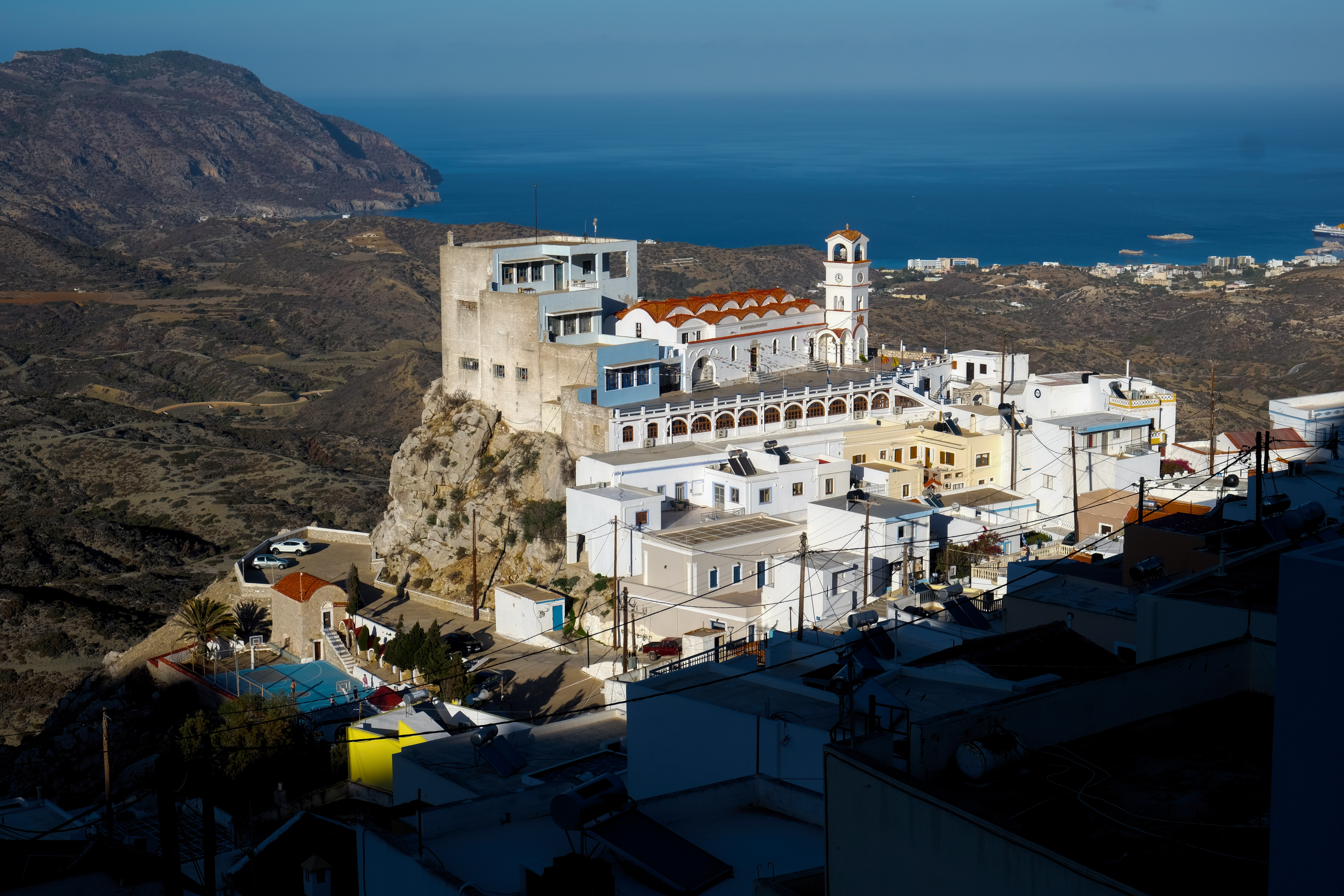
Menetes village

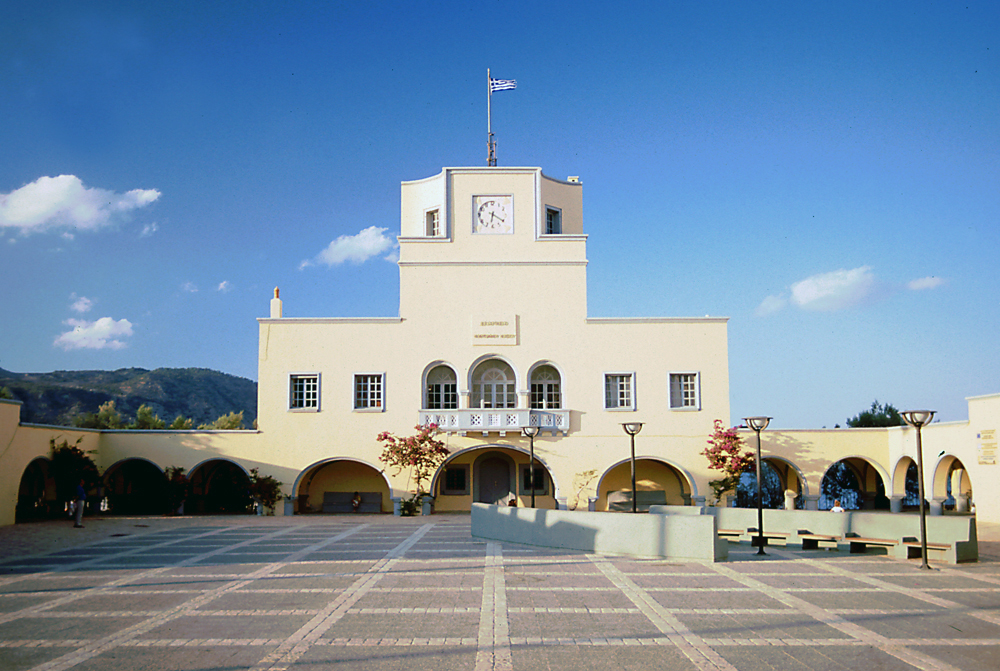
The Administration Building in Papagos Square, Pigadia, also houses the Karpathos Archaeological Museum.

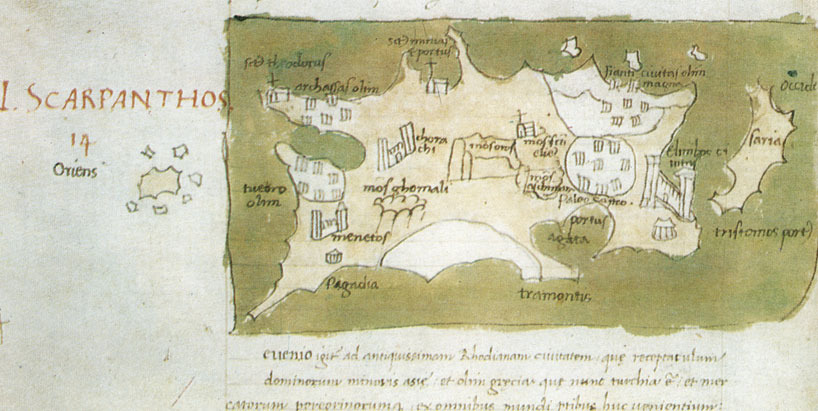
Map of Karpathos, by Buondelmonti Cristoforo, 1420

The island of Karpathos was in both ancient and medieval times closely connected with Rhodes. Its current name is mentioned, with a slight shift of one letter, in Homer's Iliad as Krapathos (οἳ δ' ἄρα Νίσυρόν τ' εἶχον Κράπαθόν τε Κάσον τε). Apollonius of Rhodes, in his epic Argonautica, made it a port of call for the Argonauts travelling between Libya and Crete (Κάρπαθος: ἔνθεν δ' οἵγε περαιώσεσθαι ἔμελλον). The island is also mentioned by Diodorus (who claims it was a colony of the Dorians), Pomponius Mela, Pliny the Elder, and Strabo.

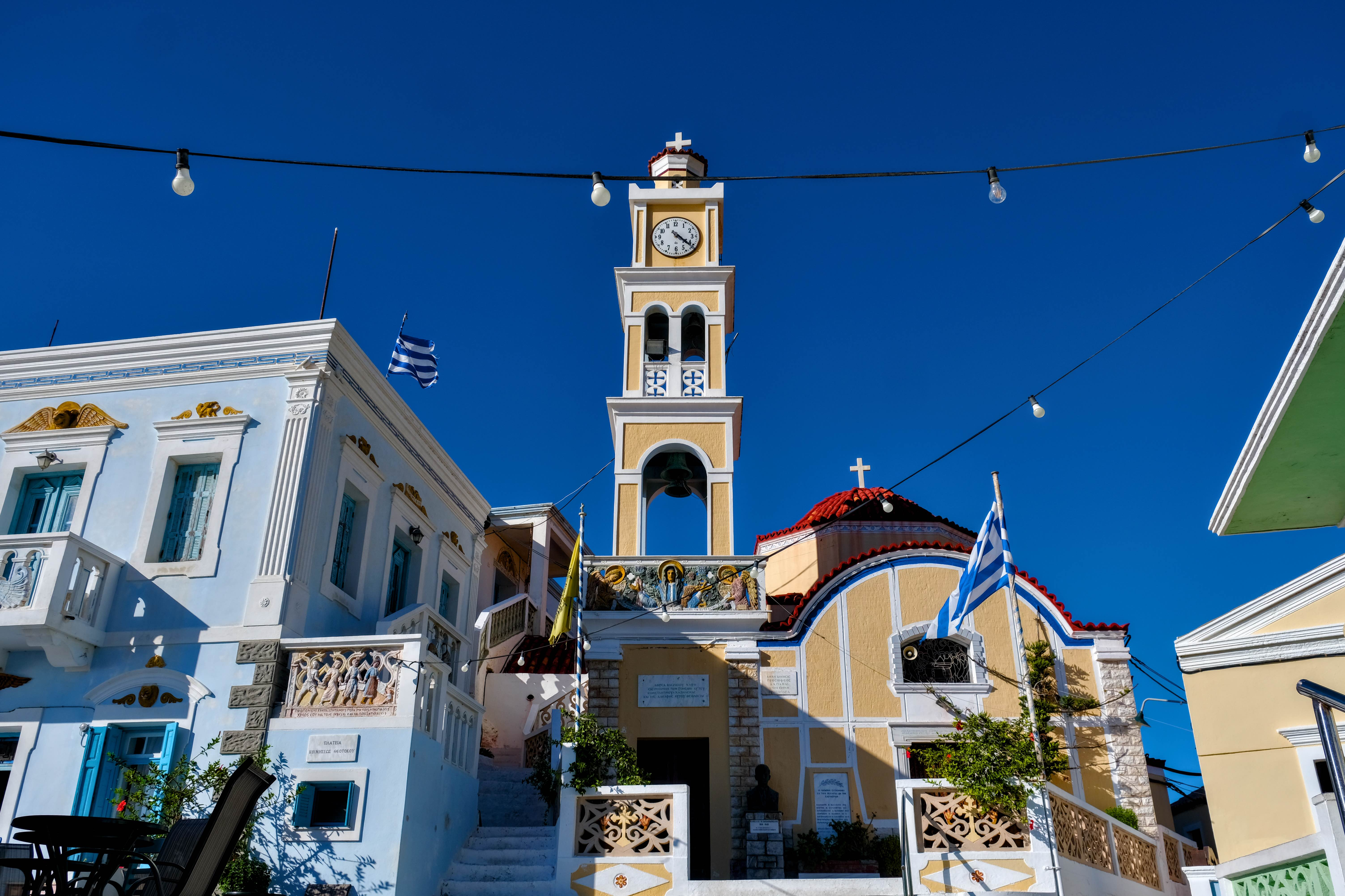
Main church of Olympos

The island's cities are listed on the Delian League's tribute lists.

The Karpathians sided with Sparta in the Peloponnesian War in 431 BCE and lost their independence to Rhodes in 400 BCE. In 42 BCE, the island fell to Rome. After the division of the Roman Empire in 395 CE, the island became part of the Byzantine Empire.

Of its Christian bishops, the names that are known of are; Olympius, who was a supporter of Nestorius, Zoticus (in 518), Mennas (in 553), Ioannes, Leo (in 787), and Philippus (in 879). In the 14th century, the island was a see of the Latin Church, four of whose bishops bore the name Nicolaus. No longer a residential bishopric, Karpathos (in Latin Carpathus) is today listed by the Catholic Church as an archiepiscopal titular see.

In 1304, Karpathos was given as fief to the Genoese corsairs Andrea and Lodovico Moresco, but in 1306 it fell to Andrea Cornaro, a member of the Venetian Cornaro family. The Cornaro controlled Karpathos until 1538, when it passed into the possession of the Ottoman Turks.

During the Greek War of Independence from 1821 to 1822, the island rebelled, but afterwards it fell again under Ottoman rule. In 1835, Sultan Mahmud II conceded to the island the privilege of the maktu tax system; that is, the tax was calculated as an annual lump sum, and not on a household basis. The Ottoman rule ended on 12 May 1912, when the Italians occupied the island and the rest of the Dodecanese, during the Italo-Turkish War of 1911–12. On that day, sailors from the Regia Marina battleship Vittorio Emanuele and the destroyer Alpino landed in Karpathos. With the Treaty of Lausanne (1923), Karpathos joined the other islands of the Dodecanese in the Italian possession of the Italian Aegean Islands. The Italians occupied the island until September 1943, when Italy surrendered. Afterwards, Karpathos was occupied by German forces, who eventually left the island on 4 October 1944. The island was ceded by Italy to Greece with the Paris Peace Treaties of 1947. The island formally joined the Kingdom of Greece on 7 March 1948, together with the other Dodecanese islands.

In the late 1940s and 1950s, due to the economic problems after World War II, a number of Karpathians emigrated to the U.S. eastern seaboard cities; Karpathos today has a significant Greek-American constituency who have returned to their island and invested heavily. Inhabitants of the mountains to the north are more traditional.

== Exploration ==
Among 19th-century explorers of the island were the British explorers Theodore and Mabel Bent in the spring of 1885. Most of their energies were spent in excavating the site of Vroukounta in the far north of the island. Some of their finds are now in the British Museum, London.

== Geography ==
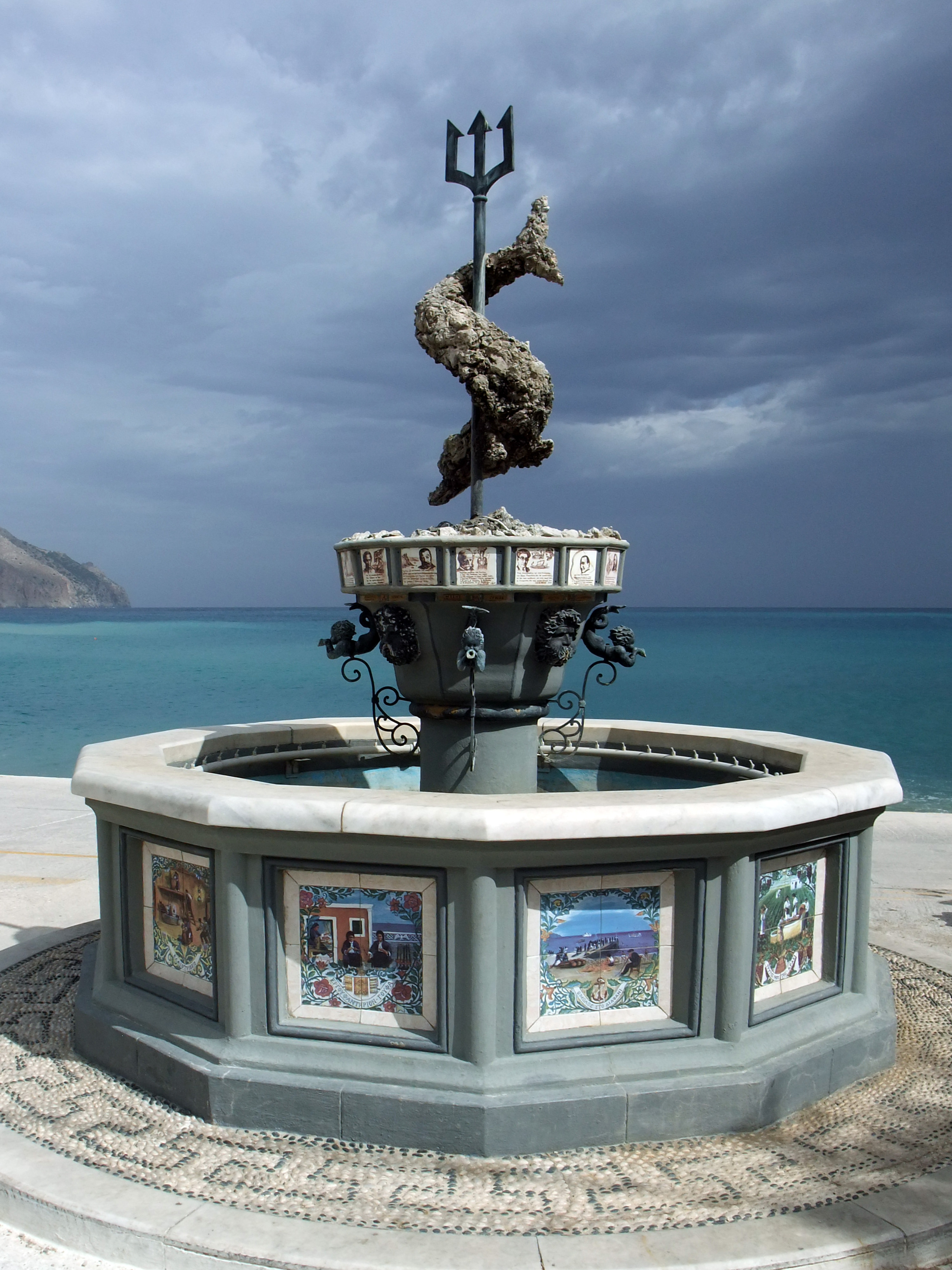
Modern fountain of Neptune (Poseidon) in Diafáni

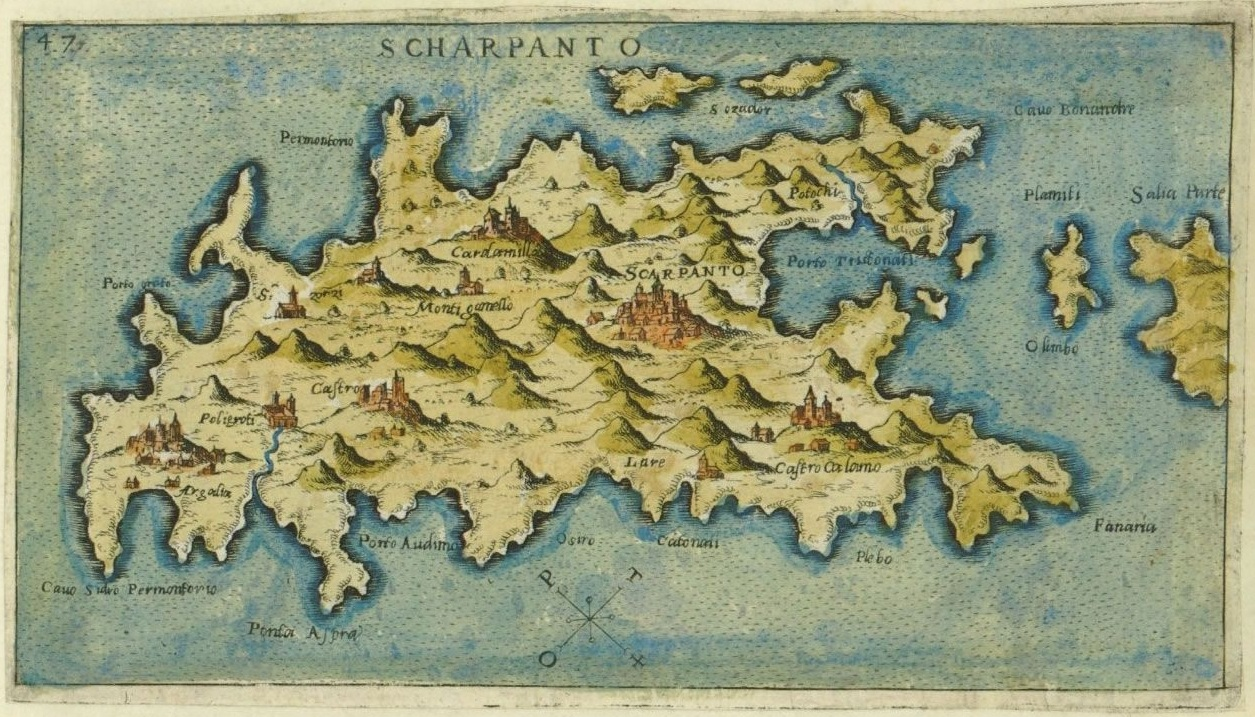
Map of Karpathos (Scarpanto), by Giacomo Franco, 1597

The island is located about 47 kilometres (29 miles) southwest of Rhodes, in the part of the Mediterranean which is called the Carpathian Sea (Latin: Carpathium Mare). The Sea of Crete, a sub-basin of the Mediterranean Sea, has its eastern limit defined by the island of Karpathos. Karpathos' highest point is Kali Limni, at 1,215 metres (3,986 ft). Karpathos comprises 11 villages. Pigadia (official name Karpathos), the capital and main port of the island, is located in the southeast of the island. The capital is surrounded by the villages of Menetes, Arkasa, Finiki, Pyles, Othos, Volada and Aperi. The villages of Mesochori and Spoa are located in central Karpathos, while Olympos and the second port of Karpathos, Diafani, are in the north.

The island Saria was once united with Karpathos, but an earthquake divided them. Saria preserves many important antiquities.

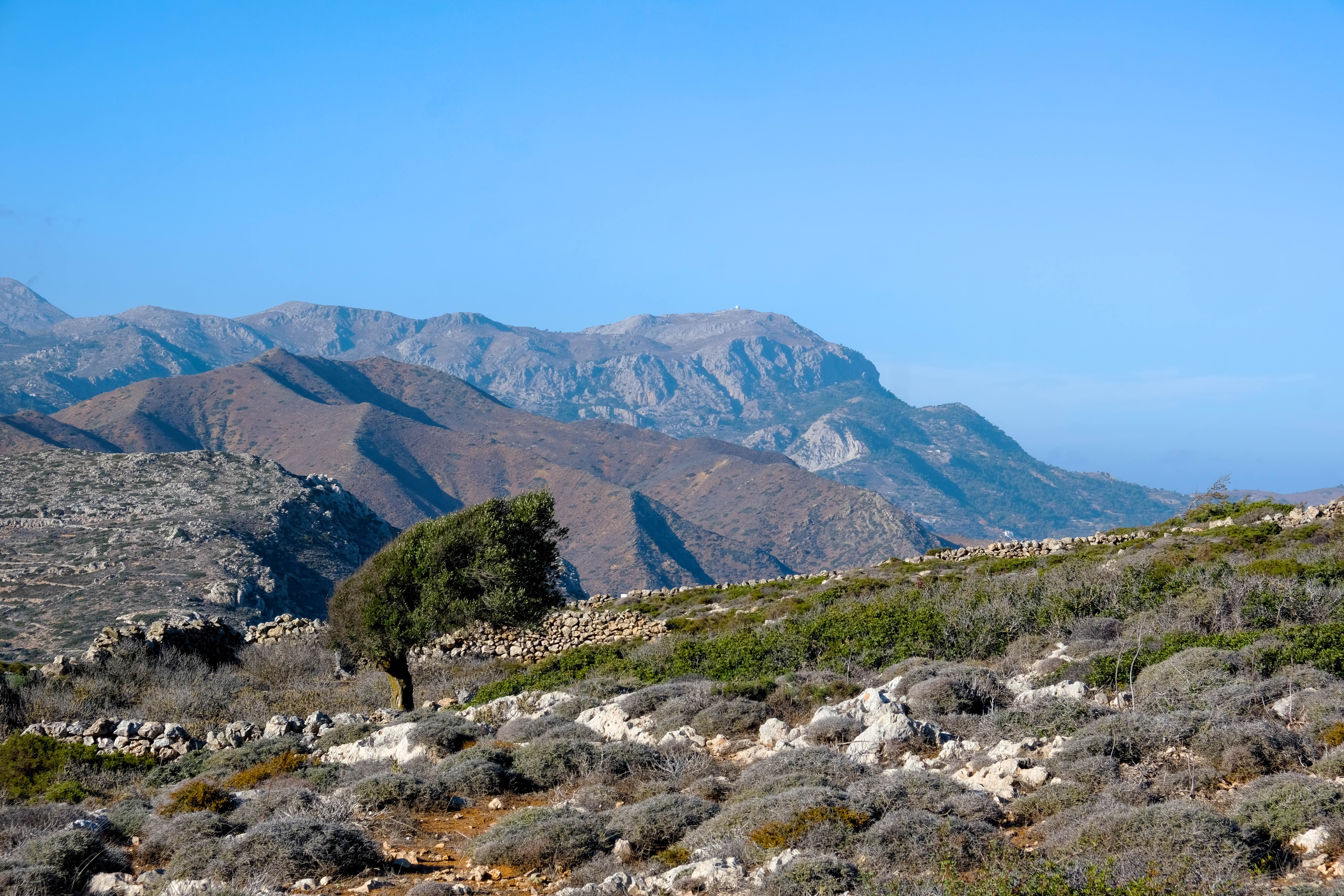
Landscape of Karpathos

=== Climate ===
Karpathos has a hot semi-arid climate (Köppen climate classification: BSh). The island has one of the mildest winters in Europe, and according to the Hellenic National Meteorological Service, the lowest temperature that has been recorded, was 2.2 °C (36 °F) on 9 February 1976 and 14 February 2004.

Climate data for Karpathos Airport (Hellenic National Meteorological Service) 1996‍–‍2026
Month	Jan	Feb	Mar	Apr	May	Jun	Jul	Aug	Sep	Oct	Nov	Dec	Year
Mean daily maximum °C (°F)	16.2 (61.2)	16.1 (61.0)	17.3 (63.1)	19.7 (67.5)	23.6 (74.5)	27.3 (81.1)	29.2 (84.6)	29.5 (85.1)	27.7 (81.9)	24.5 (76.1)	21 (70)	17.7 (63.9)	22.5 (72.5)
Daily mean °C (°F)	13.8 (56.8)	13.7 (56.7)	14.9 (58.8)	17.1 (62.8)	20.7 (69.3)	24.3 (75.7)	26.4 (79.5)	26.9 (80.4)	25.1 (77.2)	21.8 (71.2)	18.5 (65.3)	15.4 (59.7)	19.9 (67.8)
Mean daily minimum °C (°F)	11.4 (52.5)	11.4 (52.5)	12.5 (54.5)	14.5 (58.1)	17.8 (64.0)	21.4 (70.5)	23.6 (74.5)	24.2 (75.6)	22.5 (72.5)	19.2 (66.6)	16.1 (61.0)	13 (55)	17.3 (63.1)
Average rainfall mm (inches)	67.6 (2.66)	45.4 (1.79)	32 (1.3)	14.7 (0.58)	12.3 (0.48)	2.09 (0.08)	0.01 (0.00)	0 (0)	4.78 (0.19)	11.6 (0.46)	30.3 (1.19)	71.6 (2.82)	292.38 (11.55)
Source: (Mar 1996 – Feb 2026)

== Transportation ==
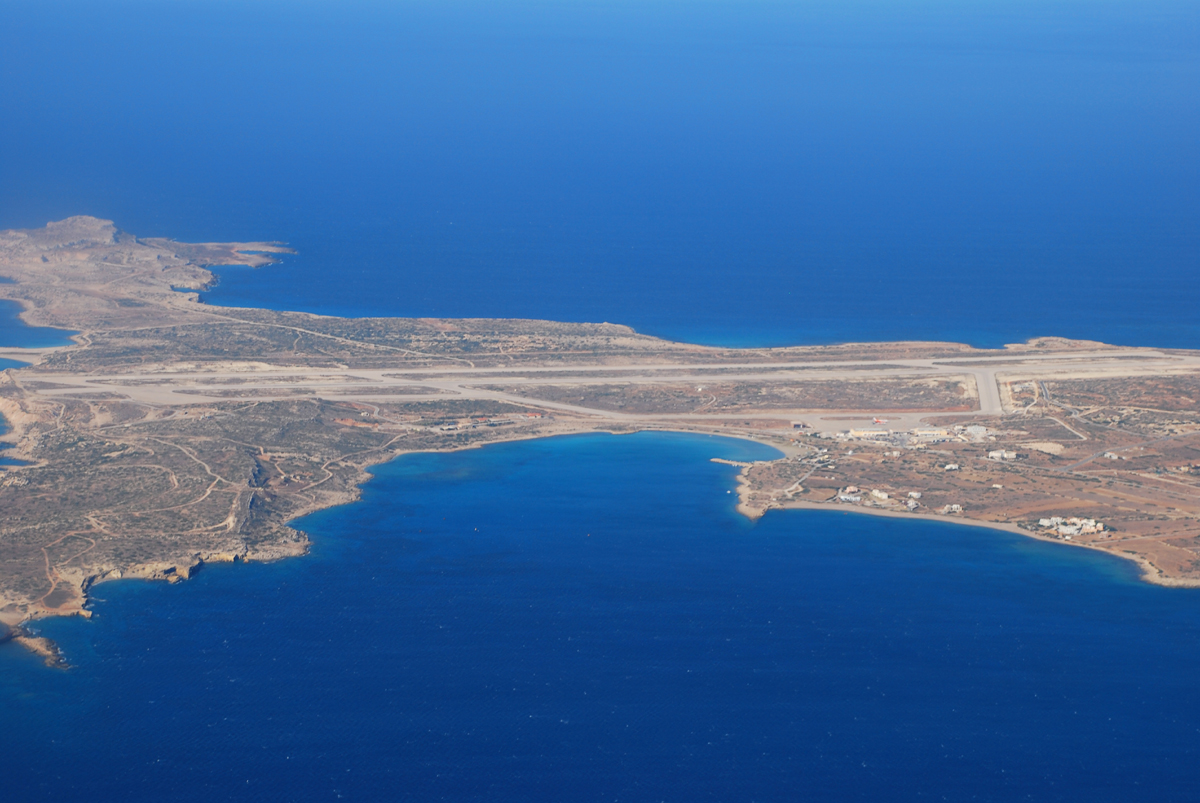
The airport

Karpathos Island National Airport, with its relatively large runway, is located on the south side (Afiartis area). Karpathos is connected to neighboring islands and to the mainland via ferries and airplanes. The ferries provide transport to and from Piraeus (via Crete and Rhodes). Scheduled domestic flights connect the island with Rhodes, Kasos, Crete and Athens daily. Additionally, charter flights from various European cities are frequently scheduled during the high season (April–October).

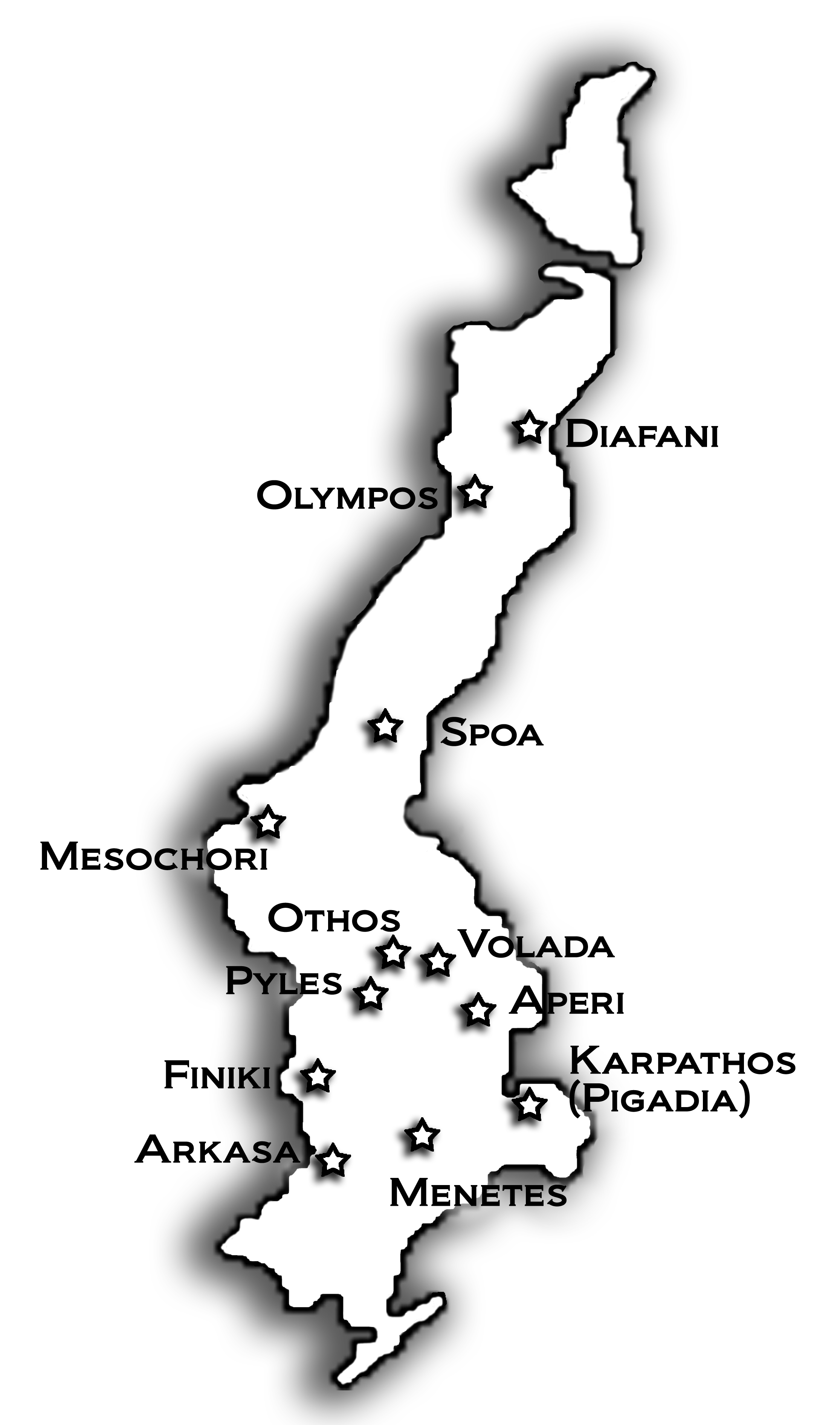
The twelve villages of Karpathos

Within the island, cars are the preferred mode of transportation. The port, the airport, the main villages and other popular locations are connected by an adequate system of municipal roads, most of which are paved. During the summer months, small private boats depart from Pigadia to various locations daily, including Olympos (via Diafani) and some inaccessible beaches. Fixed-rate taxis (agoraia) and municipal buses are also available all year long.

== Sports ==
Poseidon Karpathos F.C. is the principal and official club representing the island in the Dodecanese and the Greek regional championships. Apart from Poseidon, each village on the island maintains its own local athletic association. These include Proteas Aperi, Apollon Volada, Aris Othos, Argonautis Pyles, Koursaros Arkasa, Anagennisi Menetes, Vrysiani Mesochori, Anagennisi Spoa, and Olympos Olympou. Every summer, all local clubs participate in the Pan-Karpathian Football Championship. In addition, youth football tournaments are organized, while in recent years a basketball tournament has also been hosted at the facilities of Proteas Aperi.

== Population ==
The municipality's 2021 census population was 6,567 inhabitants. This number more than doubles in the summer months as many Karpathian expatriates come to the island for their vacation with their families. Also, taking into consideration the number of tourists that visit, there can be up to 20,000 people on the island during the summer months. The population density is greatest on the 15th of August due to the Panagias festival (Dormition of Mary), which is considered the most important festival on the island. Individuals travel from around the world to attend the festival and view the many traditions that still remain on the island.

=== Census ===
Community	1947	1951	1961	1971	1981	1991	2001	2011	2021
Karpathos (Pigadia)	-	-	-	-	-	-	2,180	2,788	3,047
Menetes	1,651	1,499	1,413	1,233	1,179	954	760	662	638
Arkasa	-	-	-	-	390	394	507	564	540
Olympos	-	-	-	-	-	-	684	556	530
Mesochori	-	-	-	-	357	344	446	371	451
Aperi	-	-	-	-	457	402	470	355	428
Othos	-	-	-	-	282	229	385	281	264
Volada	-	-	-	-	-	-	418	264	241
Spoa	339	340	380	293	251	254	301	169	224
Pyles	-	-	-	-	-	-	414	216	204

== Beaches ==
The beaches of Karpathos island can be divided into four large groups: the beaches on the east coast are smaller and gravelly but without wind; the beaches of the southern part of the island, near the airport, are made of fine white sand; the sandy beaches on the west coast are the most exposed to the Meltemi and they are available only in low wind conditions; the beaches of the north of the island are accessible only by sea and partly by jeep.

- East coast: Amoopi, Karpathos Beach (Vrontis), Achata, Kato Latos (reachable only on foot), Kyra Panagia, Apella, Agios Nikolaos (Spoa).
- South coast: Mihaliou o Kipos (known by inhabitants of the village of Othos as "Shell beach"), Damatria, Diakoftis, Devils Bay, Agrilaopotamos (nude beach), Pounta beach.
- West coast: Lefkos beach, Mesohori, Finiki, Arkasa Leucadius.
- North coast: Diafani, Alimounta (Saria island), Palatia (Saria island), Kalamia, Vananda, Apokapos (or Papa-Mina), Opsi, Kantri, Forokli, Kapi, Nati, Philios (or Agios Minas), Agnontia.

== See also ==
- List of traditional Greek place names

== Sources ==
- Bertarelli, L.V. (1929). Guida d'Italia, Vol. XVII. Consociazione Turistica Italiana, Milano.
