= Hybridogenesis in water frogs =

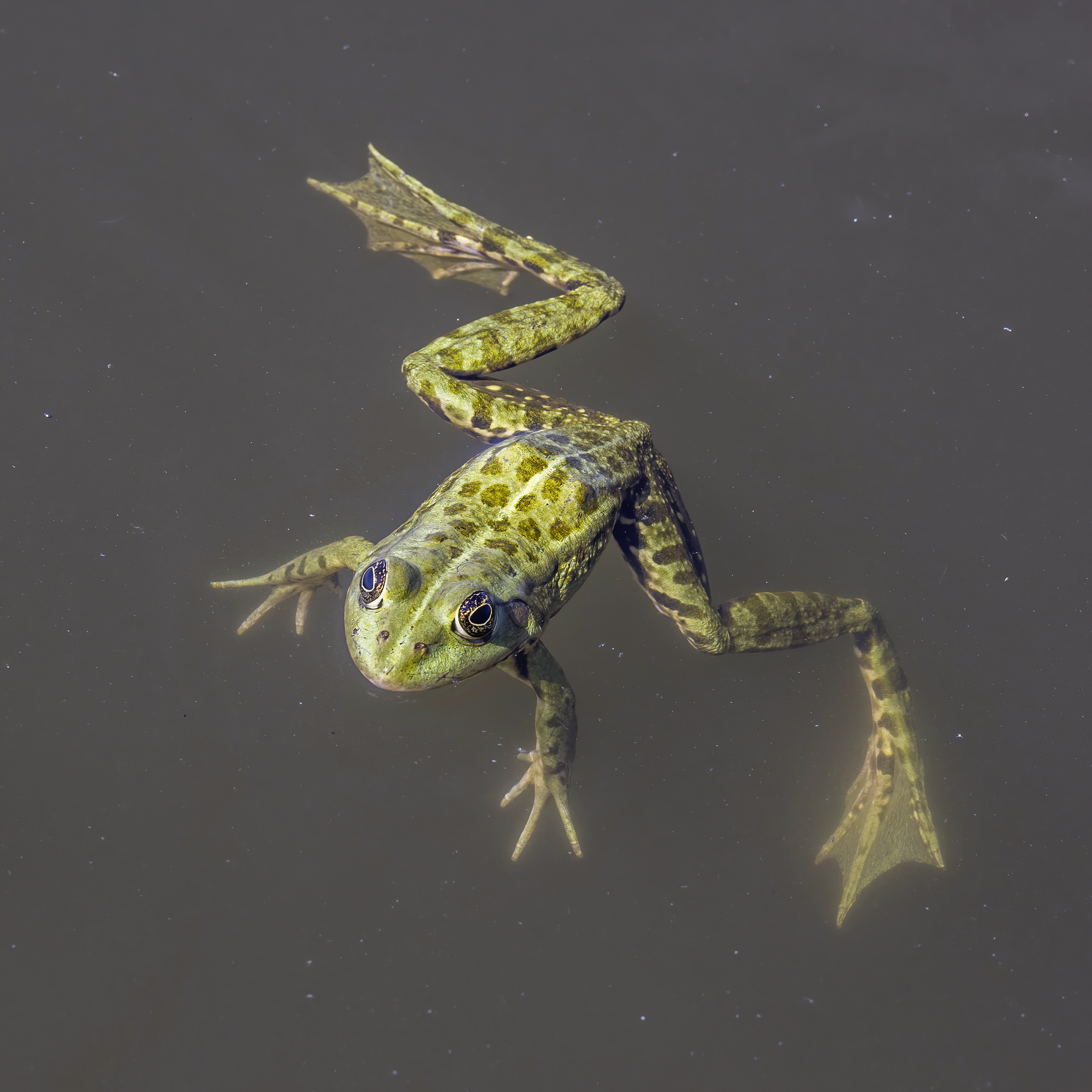
in the Danube delta

The fertile hybrids of European water frogs (genus Pelophylax) reproduce by hybridogenesis (hemiclonally). This means that during gametogenesis, they discard the genome of one of the parental species and produce gametes of the other parental species (containing a genome not recombined with the genome of the first parental species). The first parental genome is restored by fertilization of these gametes with gametes from the first species (sexual host). In all-hybrid populations of the edible frog Pelophylax kl. esculentus, however, triploid hybrids provide this missing genome.

Because half of the genome is transmitted to the next generation clonally (not excluded unrecombined intact genome), and only the other half sexually (recombined genome of the sexual host), the hybridogenesis is a hemiclonal mode of reproduction.

For example, the edible frog Pelophylax kl. esculentus (mostly RL genome), which is a hybridogenetic hybrid of the marsh frog P. ridibundus (RR) and the pool frog P. lessonae (LL), usually excludes the lessonae genome (L) and generates gametes of the P. ridibundus (R). In other words, edible frogs produce gametes of marsh frogs.

The hybrid populations are propagated, however, not by the above primary hybridisations, but predominantly by backcrosses with one of the parental species they coexist (live in sympatry) with (see below in the middle).

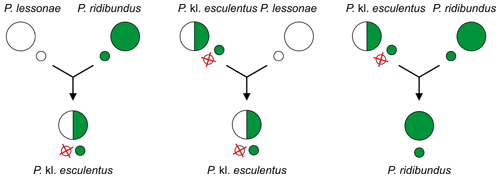
Example crosses between pool frog (Pelophylax lessonae), marsh frog (P. ridibundus) and their hybrid - edible frog (P. kl. esculentus). The first example is the primary hybridization-generating cross. The second one is an example of hybridogenesis and occurs in the most widespread hybridogenetic L–E system, the third example occurs in the R–E system, is less frequent in nature, but is considered as possible e.g., if an L-E system is invaded by P. ridibundus. P. kl. esculentus × P. kl. esculentus crossings result in inviable P. ridibundus tadpoles and are not shown here. Large circles - adult frogs, small circles - gametes, × - lack of gametes containing genome of one of the parental species.

Since the hybridogenetic hybrids require another taxon as sexual host to reproduce, usually one of the parental species, they are called kleptons (with "kl." in scientific names).

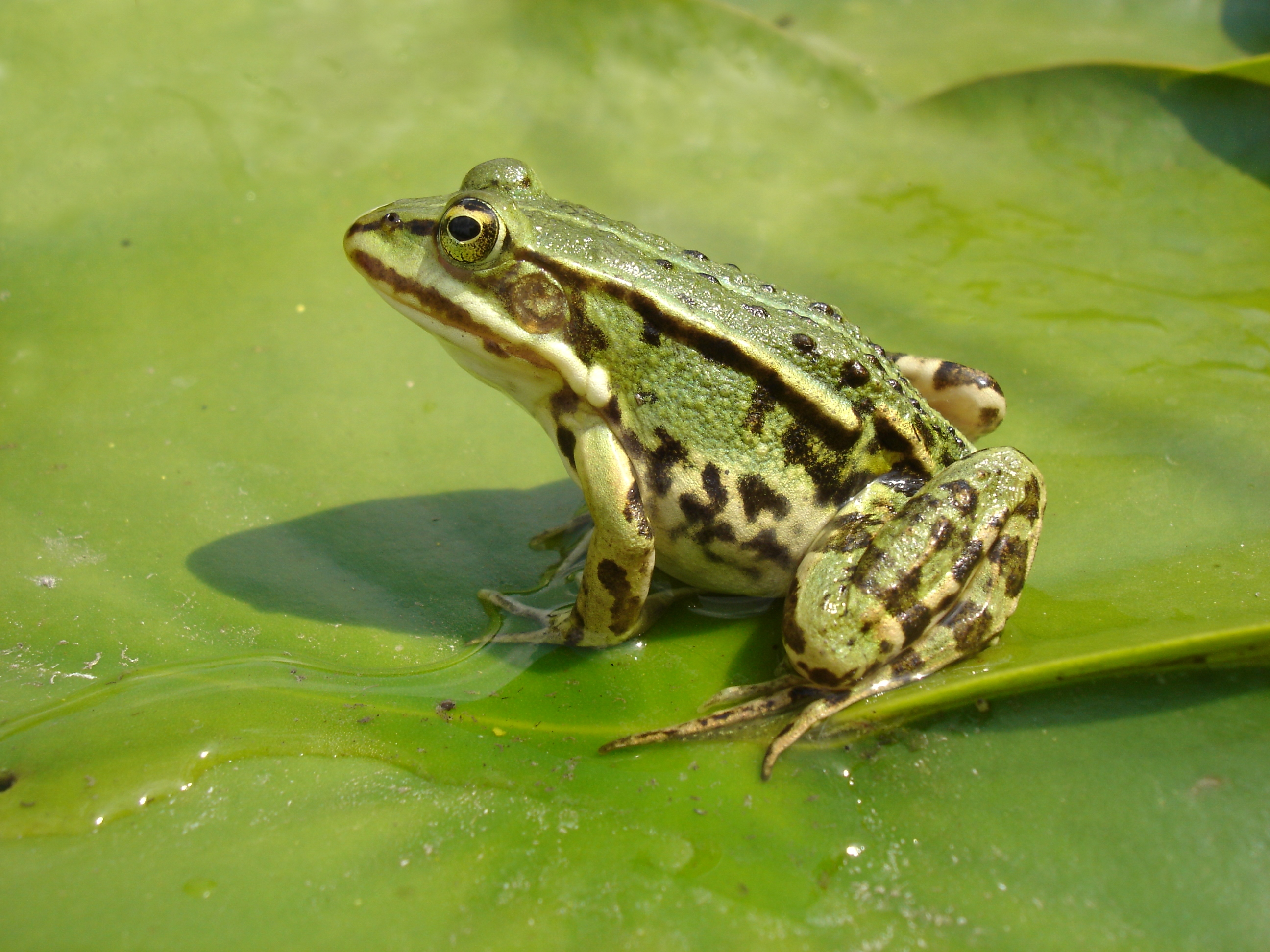
Edible frog Pelophylax kl. esculentus

There are three known hybridogenetic hybrids of the European water frogs:

- edible frog Pelophylax kl. esculentus (usually genotype RL):
  pool frog P. lessonae (LL) × P. ridibundus (RR)
- Graf's hybrid frog Pelophylax kl. grafi (PR):
  Perez's frog P. perezi (PP) × P. ridibundus (RR) or
  Perez's frog P. perezi (PP) × edible frog P. kl. esculentus (RE)
  (it is unclear which one crossing was the primary hybridisation)
- Italian edible frog Pelophylax kl. hispanicus (RB):
  Italian pool frog P. bergeri (BB) × P. ridibundus (RR)

== Parental genome exclusion ==
Hybridogenesis implies that gametes of hybrids don't contain mixed parental genomes, as normally occurs by independent chromosome segregation and crossover in meiosis (see also second Mendel's law, recombination). Instead, each gamete carries a complete (haploid) genome of only one parent species. Usually one entire genome of the parental species is excluded prior to meiosis during gametogenesis, such that only one (remaining) parental genome is represented among gametes and genes from the other parent are not passed on by the hybridogen. This discarding occurs gradually during subsequent mitotic divisions, not in one step.

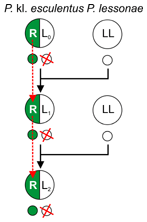
Pelophylax kl. esculentus are a hemiclone here, because they share half of their genome (R haplotype, red arrows). L-E system.

Typical gametogenesis in Pelophylax kl. esculentus (in the L-E system). 1 - exclusion of the P. lessonae genome, 2 - duplication (endoreduplication) of the P. ridibundus genome - restoration of diploidy, 3 - meiosis, L and R - P. lessonae and ridibundus genomes.

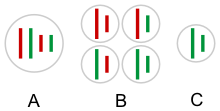
Gametes of a hybridogenetic hybrid contain the unrecombined genome of one parental species (C), instead of all possible combinations of both parental (red and green) chromosomes (B). A – somatic cell.

== Hemiclones ==
Hybridogenesis is a hemiclonal mode of reproduction — half of a hybrid genome is transmitted intact clonally from generation to generation (R genome in the L-E system) — not recombined with a parental species genome (L here), while the other half (L) is transmitted sexually — obtained (replaced) each generation by sexual reproduction with a parental species (sexual host, P. lessonae in the L-E system).

== Hybridogenetic systems overview ==
There are at least three hybridogenetic species (hybrids) of water frogs in Europe – edible frog Pelophylax kl. esculentus, Graf's hybrid frog Pelophylax kl. grafi and Italian edible frog Pelophylax kl. hispanicus. Their mating patterns are classified into several hybridogenetic systems:

Hybrid	Originated from			Maintained by crosses with	Excluded genome	System
Pelophylax kl. esculentus RL	P. ridibundus RR	×	P. lessonae LL	P. lessonae LL	L	L–E
Pelophylax kl. esculentus RL	P. ridibundus RR	×	P. lessonae LL	P. ridibundus RR	R or L 3:1	R–E
Pelophylax kl. esculentus RL	P. ridibundus RR	×	P. lessonae LL	P. kl. esculentus LLR	L from RL; R from LLR	E
Pelophylax kl. esculentus RL	P. ridibundus RR	×	P. lessonae LL	P. kl. esculentus RRL	R or L 3:1 from RL; L from RRL	E
Pelophylax kl. grafi RP	P. ridibundus ? RR or P. kl. esculentus ? RL	×	P. perezi PP	P. perezi PP	P	P–G
Pelophylax kl. hispanicus RB	P. ridibundus RR	×	P. bergeri BB	P. bergeri BB	B	B–H

(capital abbreviations below scientific names are genotypes)

All these hybrids contain genome of marsh frog P. ridibundus (R) and genome of second parental species (L, P or B).

Most of above hybridogenic systems consist of a hybrid coexisting (living in sympatry) with one of the parental species required for its reproduction. P. kl. esculentus for example in the most frequent L-E system must mate with P. lessonae to produce new hybrids, in the R-E system with P. ridibundus. Because these hybrids depend on other taxa as sexual hosts to reproduce ("parasitize" on them sexually), they are kleptons ("kl." in scientific names).

== Edible frog Pelophylax kl. esculentus ==
The Pelophylax esculentus complex consists of the hybrid taxon – edible frog P. kl. esculentus (genotype RL) and parental species – marsh frog P. ridibundus (RR) and pool frog P. lessonae (LL). Hybrids are females and males, which is unusual, because hybrids of other hybridogenic species are only females.

The primary hybridisation originating P. kl. esculentus (genotype RL) is:

- P. lessonae (LL) × P. ridibundus (RR)

It occurs between P. lessonae (LL) males and P. ridibundus (RR) females, because smaller P. lessonae males prefer larger females. The lineages of hybrids are maintained later through other matings, described below.

P. lessonae and P. ridibundus have distinct habitat requirements and usually don't live together.

=== P. lessonae – P. kl. esculentus (L–E) system ===
The P. lessonae – P. kl. esculentus (L–E, LE, lessonae–esculentus) system is most widespread hybridogenetic system. It is found in Western Europe.

Hybrids P. kl. esculentus (genotype RL) exclude here the P. lessonae genome (L) and make exclusively clonal P. ridibundus gametes (R). In other words, edible frogs produce gametes of marsh frogs! Their lineages are maintained usually through backcrosses of a female P. kl. esculentus (RL) with a male P. lessonae (LL). The offspring consist of only P. kl. esculentus.

P. kl. esculentus hybrids (RL) can mate also with each other, but only 3% of resulting tadpoles (RR) survive to sexual maturity (97% do not). The genomes of interhybrid crosses are female, because of carrying X chromosomes of females from primary hybridisation.

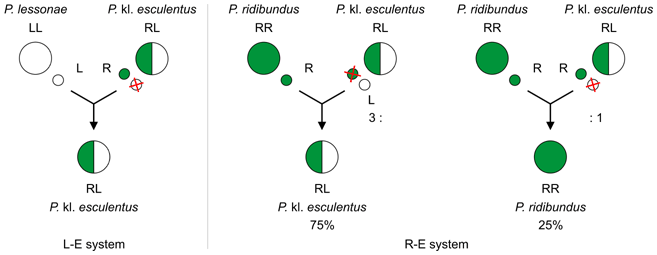
Hybridogenesis – L–E and R–E systems.

=== P. ridibundus – P. kl. esculentus (R–E) system ===
The P. ridibundus – P. kl. esculentus (R–E, RE, ridibundus–esculentus) system inhabits Eastern Europe.

It is essentially a reverse form of the L–E system.

Hybrids P. kl. esculentus (genotype RL) exclude here the P. ridibundus (R) or P. lessonae (L) genome in a 3:1 ratio and make mainly clonal P. lessonae (L), less P. ridibundus gametes (R). One frog produce either L or R gametes or a mixture of both. Their lineages are maintained through backcrosses of a male P. kl. esculentus (RL) with a female P. ridibundus (RR). The offspring consist of P. kl. esculentus males (75%) or P. ridibundus females (25%). This is called hybrid-amphispermy.

=== All-hybrid populations (E system) ===
All-hybrid populations (E system, EE–system) consist exclusively of P. kl. esculentus – diploid RE and triploid LLR or RRL hybrids. There are even known tetraploid LLRR hybrids. All-hybrid populations inhabit the entire range of the water frog complex.

RL diploids discard L genome and produce gametes of P. ridibundus (R), or discard R or L genome and produce gametes of P. lessonae (L) or P. ridibundus (R) respectively. In both cases, diploid hybrids generate also not reduced diploid gametes (RL) needed to recreate triploids.

Triploids LLR and RRL are providers of P. lessonae (L) and P. ridibundus gametes (R) respectively in this system lacking both of parental species. So triploid hybrids allow P. kl. esculentus populations to remain without the parental species.

Because triploids discard this genome, which is available in one copy and leave two copies of second genome, they don't perform endoreduplication. Moreover, this not eliminated genome is transmitted to haploid gametes sexually, not clonally (recombined between two L's or between two R's), in contrast to the genome of diploid hybrids.

Such modified hybridogenesis (or gametogenetic system) occurring in allotriploid hybrids, where during meiosis chromosomes (genomes) from the doubled set (LL from LLR or RR from RRL here) are used to produce haploid gametes (L or R respectively), whereas the remaining ones may be excluded (R from LLR or L from RRL) is known as meiotic hybridogenesis.

In one Slovak population however, triploid males (LLR) and diploid LR females generate clonal LL and clonal R gametes respectively, instead of recombined L and clonal LR.

P. lessonae (LL) and P. ridibundus (RR) offspring do not survive to sexual maturity in the E system.

Adults (P. kl. esculentus)		Gametes
LLR	→	L
LR	→	LR*, R, L**
LRR	→	R

Gametes		Offspring
L + L	→	~~LL~~	P. lessonae
L + LR*	→	LLR	P. kl. esculentus
L + R	→	LR	P. kl. esculentus
LR* + R	→	LRR	P. kl. esculentus
R + R	→	~~RR~~	P. ridibundus

Maintenance of pure (all-hybrid) P. kl. esculentus populations, without P. lessonae and ridibundus.

L, R – P. lessonae and P. ridibundus haploid genomes;
~~LL~~, ~~RR~~ – do not survive to sexual maturity;
* females only (eggs); ** L gametes are produced by LR, but author doesn't write whether they take part in reproduction or not.

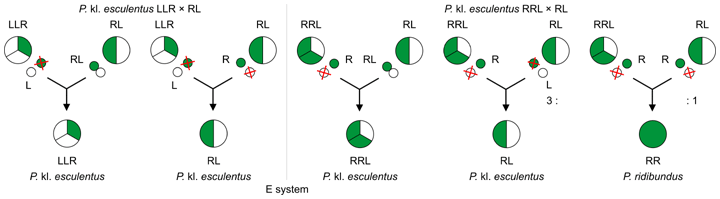
Hybridogenesis – All-hybrid (E) system.

== Graf's hybrid frog Pelophylax kl. grafi and the P–G system ==
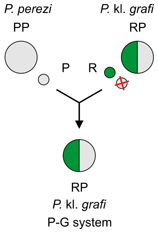
Hybridogenesis in Graf's hybrid frog Pelophylax kl. grafi (P–G system).

It is not clear, whether the primary hybridisation which originated Graf's hybrid frog Pelophylax kl. grafi (genotype PR) was:

- Perez's frog P. perezi (PP) × marsh frog P. ridibundus (RR) or
- Perez's frog P. perezi (PP) × edible frog P. kl. esculentus (RE)

Unlike P. perezi and Pelophylax kl. grafi, P. ridibundus and P. kl. esculentus do not belong to native fauna of Iberian Peninsula.

Hybrids P. kl. grafi (PR) discard the P. perezi genome (P) and make exclusively clonal P. ridibundus gametes (R). Their lineages are maintained in so called P–G system through backcrosses of P. kl. grafi (PR) with P. perezi (PP).

== Italian edible frog Pelophylax kl. hispanicus and the B–H system ==
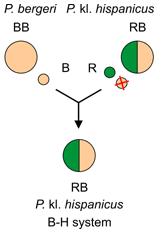
Hybridogenesis in Italian edible frog Pelophylax kl. hispanicus (B–H system).

The primary hybridisation which originated Italian edible frog Pelophylax kl. hispanicus (genotype RB) was:

- Italian pool frog P. bergeri (BB) × marsh frog P. ridibundus (RR)

Hybrids Pelophylax kl. hispanicus (RB) discard the P. bergeri genome (B) and make exclusively clonal P. ridibundus gametes (R). Their lineages are maintained in so called B–H system through backcrosses of P. kl. hispanicus (PR) with P. bergeri (BB).

== Water frogs and hybridogenesis definition ==
Mating patterns of hybridogenetic water frogs don't fit precisely known definitions of hybridogenesis:

- hybridogenetic hybrids are not only females, but also males
- in all-hybrid populations of the edible frog Pelophylax kl. not another species, but esculentus triploid hybrids of the same species provide excluded genome, serving (adopting the role) as the sexual host (sexual host species from definitions), what actually is not an exception to the rule.

== Mitochondrial DNA ==
The Pelophylax kl. esculentus complex frogs have either of four phenotypes of mtDNA:

Taxon	mtDNA type			
Taxon	A	B	C	D
marsh frog P. ridibundus	+	+		
pool frog P. lessonae			+	+
edible frog P. kl. esculentus	+	+	+	+

Type A is P. ridibundus specific and type B is P. lessonae-like (differs only by 0.3% from type C). Most of P. kl. esculentus have C or D phenotype of the P. lessonae, not P. ridibundus mtDNA.

Distribution of these phenotypes don't reflect exactly typical matting patterns. Mitochondria along with the mtDNA are inherited exclusively from the female. Since the primary hybridisations producing P. kl. esculentus occur between P. ridibundus females (large) and P. lessonae males (small) and later are maintained through backcrosses P. kl. esculentus females with P. lessonae males (L–E system), the expected mtDNA phenotype of P. kl. esculentus would be the phenotype of P. ridibundus. This unexpected phenotype distribution might be explained in such a way that most of P. kl. esculentus lineages might go through at least one backcross between P. kl. esculentus male with P. lessonae female. And such phenotype pattern suggests, that primary hybridisations are rare.

The introgression of P. lessonae mtDNA in P. ridibundus (type B) might be caused by matting between P. ridibundus and P. kl. esculentus having P. lessonae mtDNA.

== Evolutionary origin of hybridogenesis in edible frog ==
During the ice ages, the population of the common ancestor of both parental species of the edible frog was split into two. These populations diverged, but remained genetically close enough to be able to create fertile hybrids. However, when diploid edible frogs mate with each other, their offspring are often malformed, so there are no pure populations of edible frogs unless some triploid individuals are present (the E system described above).

== Impact of alien species ==
Introduction of alien species belonging to water frog complex (Pelophylax esculentus complex), for example, the exotic marsh frog P. ridibundus, may be harmful to native frog populations because of the creation of new hybridisation opportunities and subsequent exclusion of some of genomes from the population. In some cases it was proved.

== See also ==
- Parthenogenesis
- Parthenogenesis in amphibians
- Gynogenesis
