= Haplometra cylindracea =

Scientific classification
- Domain: Eukaryota
- Kingdom: Animalia
- Phylum: Platyhelminthes
- Class: Trematoda
- Order: Plagiorchiida
- Family: Plagiorchiidae
- Genus: Haplometra
- Species: H. cylindracea

Binomial name
- Haplometra cylindracea (Zeder, 1800)

Species of fluke

Haplometra cylindracea is a trematode parasite of frogs. Adult worms measure usually 10 mm and they are located in the lungs. H. cylindracea develops through 2 intermediate hosts: the first, a freshwater snail, the second, a water beetle.

== Morphology ==
Adult worms are usually 10 mm long and they have elongate, cylindrical body. Ventral sucker is smaller than oral sucker. Eggs are dark brown in colour and measures 220 μm. Cercariae contains characteristic stylet.

== Hosts ==
Definitive hosts are frogs. H. cylindracea was documented in Rana temporaria, Rana esculenta, Rana ridibunda, Rana dalmatina, Rana arvalis, Bufo spp., Bombina spp.

First intermediate host is snail from family Lymnaeidae, i.e. Galba truncatula, Lymnaea palustris, Radix spp.
