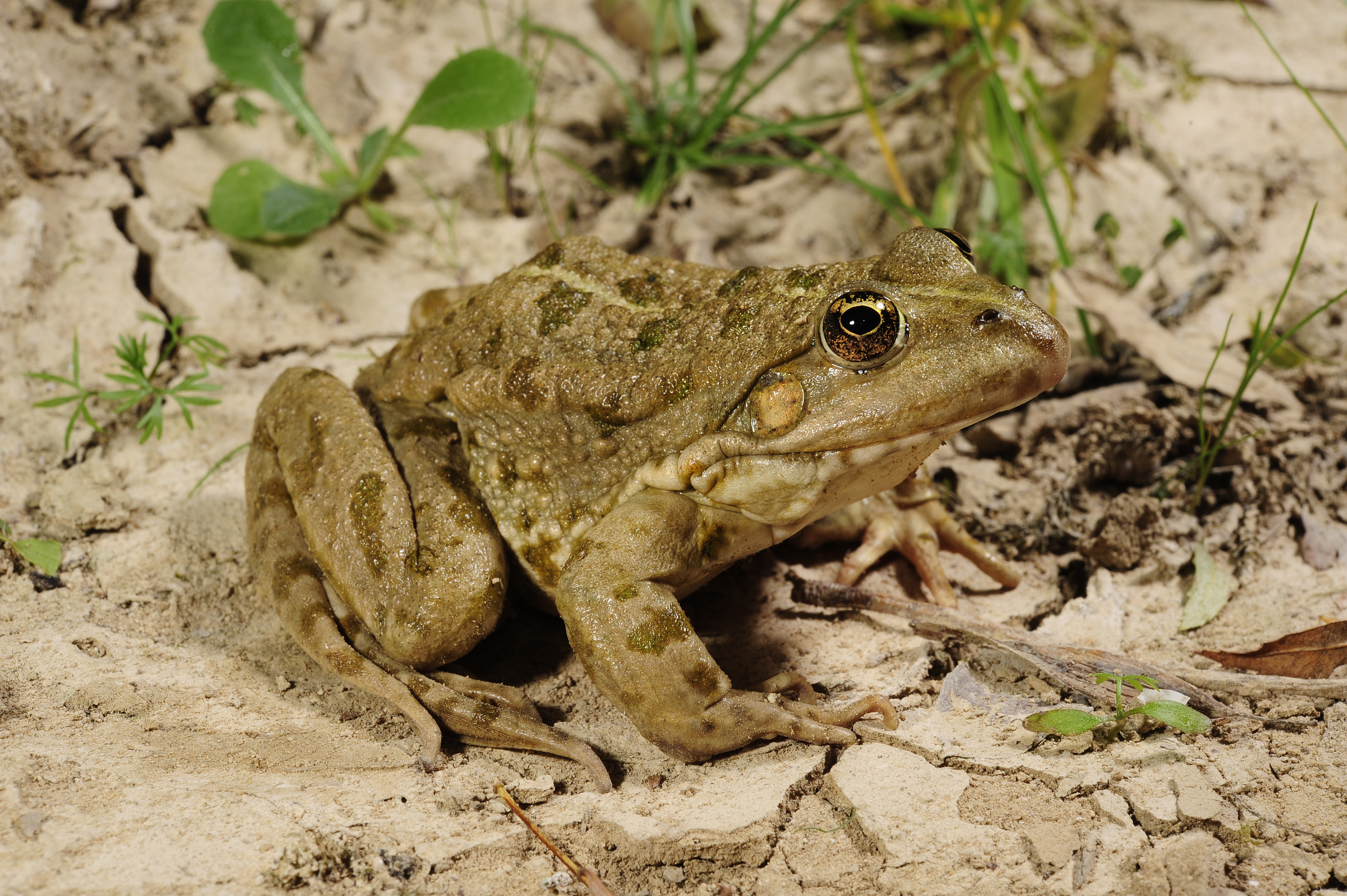

Scientific classification
- Kingdom: Animalia
- Phylum: Chordata
- Class: Amphibia
- Order: Anura
- Family: Ranidae
- Genus: Pelophylax
- Species: P. perezi × P. ridibundus

Binomial name
- Pelophylax kl. grafi (Crochet, Dubois, Ohler & Tunner, 1995)
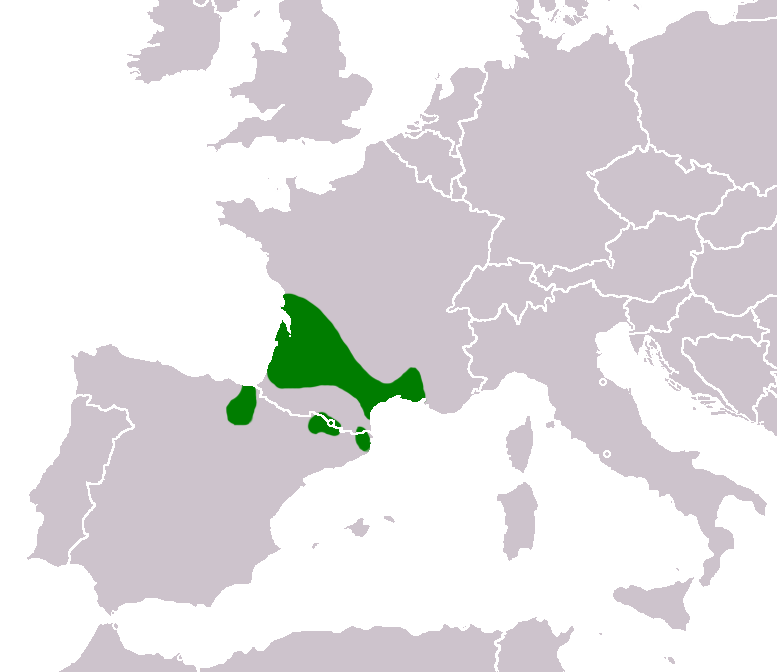

Synonyms
- Pelophylax grafi (Crochet, Dubois, Ohler & Tunner, 1995); Rana grafi Crochet, Dubois, Ohler & Tunner, 1995

= Pelophylax kl. grafi =

Graf's hybrid frog

Hybrid amphibian

Graf's hybrid frog (Pelophylax kl. grafi) is a hybridogenic species in the true frog family Ranidae. It is found in France and Spain. Its natural habitats are rivers, intermittent rivers, swamps, freshwater lakes, intermittent freshwater lakes, freshwater marshes, intermittent freshwater marshes, arable land, pastureland, and heavily degraded former forest. It is becoming rare due to habitat loss.

== Taxonomy ==
It is a hybrid between Perez's frog and the marsh frog. It is called Grenouille de Graf in French.

== Description ==
Graf's hybrid frog is a medium to large frog, with a length of around 12 cm. It is typically green, with dark spots on the back and sometimes a light green band along the center of the back. It can vary in color quite significantly from brown to grayish-brown. It has a bright yellow iris with horizontal oval pupils and visible eardrums. The skin is smooth or slightly bumpy. Males have two white vocal sacs. Eggs have a diameter of between 1 and 2.5 mm, are light brown above and yellowish below.

== Distribution ==
The species is found widely throughout southern France and portions of the Iberian Peninsula. It inhabits a wide variety of aquatic habitats, including freshwater and brackish water bodies of natural or man-made origin.

== Ecology ==
Graf's hybrid frog is a fertile hybrid. Frogs mate via amplexus, with females laying 800 to several thousands eggs in several clusters in shallow water or near vegetation. These eggs are then fertilized by the male.

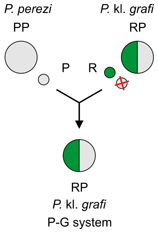
Hybridogenesis in Graf's hybrid frog Pelophylax kl. grafi (P–G system).

== See also ==
- Hybridogenesis in water frogs
