= Choledocystus =

Scientific classification
- Kingdom: Animalia
- Phylum: Platyhelminthes
- Class: Trematoda
- Order: Plagiorchiida
- Family: Plagiorchiidae
- Genus: Choledocystus; Pereira & Cuocolo, 1941

Species
- Several, including: Choledocystus elegans (Travassos, 1926); Choledocystus hepaticus

Genus of flukes

Choledocystus is a genus of parasitic flukes, flatworms in the family Plagiorchiidae.
