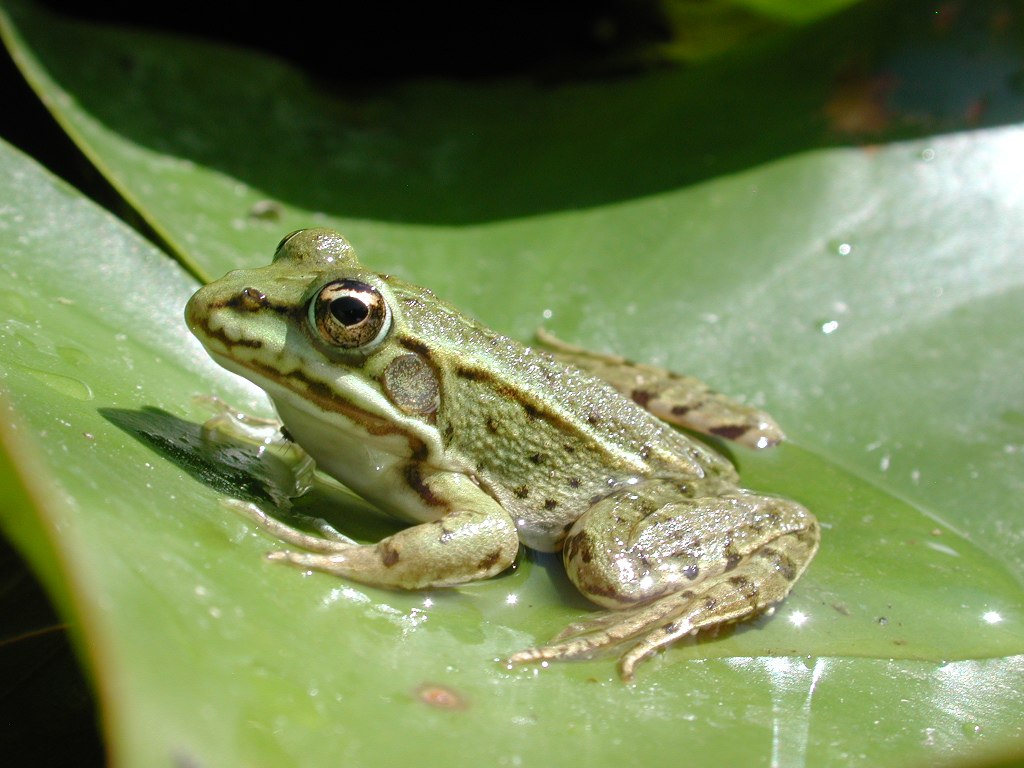

Scientific classification
- Kingdom: Animalia
- Phylum: Chordata
- Class: Amphibia
- Order: Anura
- Family: Ranidae
- Genus: Pelophylax
- Species: P. bergeri × P. ridibundus

Binomial name
- Pelophylax kl. hispanicus (Bonaparte, 1839)
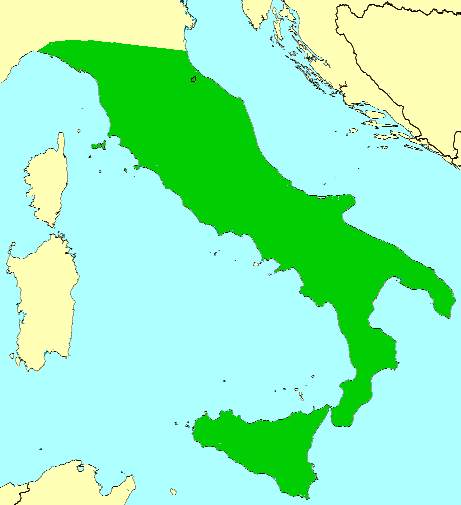

Synonyms
- Pelophylax hispanicus (Bonaparte, 1839); Rana hispanica Bonaparte, 1839

= Italian edible frog =

Hybrid amphibian

The Italian edible frog (Pelophylax kl. hispanicus) is a hybridogenic species in the true frog family Ranidae. These frogs are the offspring of P. bergeri and either P. ridibundus or the edible frog (P. kl. esculentus) which is itself of hybrid origin.

It is endemic to Italy; despite the specific name hispanicus (Latin for "the Spanish one"), it does not occur in Spain. Its natural habitats are rivers, intermittent rivers, swamps, freshwater lakes, intermittent freshwater lakes, freshwater marshes, and intermittent freshwater marshes. It is not considered threatened by the IUCN.

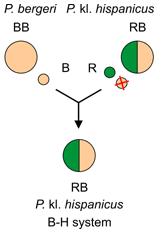
Hybridogenesis in Italian edible frog Pelophylax kl. hispanicus (B–H system).

== See also ==
- Hybridogenesis in water frogs
