= Haplometra =

Scientific classification
- Kingdom: Animalia
- Phylum: Platyhelminthes
- Class: Trematoda
- Order: Plagiorchiida
- Family: Plagiorchiidae
- Genus: Haplometra; Looss, 1899

Genus of flatworms

Haplometra is a genus of flatworms belonging to the family Plagiorchiidae.

The species of this genus are found in Europe.

Species:

- Haplometra brevicaeca Timon-David, 1962
- Haplometra cylindracea (Zeder, 1800)
