= Plagiorchis elegans =

Scientific classification
- Kingdom: Animalia
- Phylum: Platyhelminthes
- Class: Trematoda
- Order: Plagiorchiida
- Family: Plagiorchiidae
- Genus: Plagiorchis
- Species: P. elegans

Binomial name
- Plagiorchis elegans (Rudolphi, 1802)

Species of fluke

Plagiorchis elegans is a species of parasitic trematodes (flukes) in the genus Plagiorchis. Its host is Stagnicola elodes.
