= Plagiorchis =

Scientific classification
- Kingdom: Animalia
- Phylum: Platyhelminthes
- Class: Trematoda
- Order: Plagiorchiida
- Family: Plagiorchiidae
- Genus: Plagiorchis; Lühe, 1899

Species
- Plagiorchis elegans (Rudolphi, 1802); Plagiorchis fastuosus Szidat, 1924; Plagiorchis laricola Skrjabin, 1924; Plagiorchis moravicus Sitko, 1993; Plagiorchis mutationis Panova, 1927; Plagiorchis nanus (Rudolphi, 1802); Plagiorchis notabilis Nicoll, 1909; Plagiorchis pseudofastuosus Belopol'skaya, 1975; Plagiorchis vitellatus (von Linstow, 1875)

Genus of flukes

Plagiorchis is a genus of parasitic trematodes (flukes) in the family Plagiorchiidae.
