= Pelophylax fukienensis =

Conservation status
- Least Concern (IUCN 3.1)

Scientific classification
- Kingdom: Animalia
- Phylum: Chordata
- Class: Amphibia
- Order: Anura
- Family: Ranidae
- Genus: Pelophylax
- Species: P. fukienensis

Binomial name
- Pelophylax fukienensis (Pope, 1929)
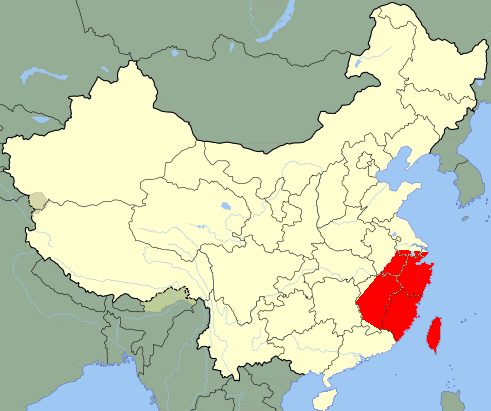

Synonyms
- Rana fukienensis Pope, 1929; Rana plancyi fukienensis Pope, 1929

Species of frog

Pelophylax fukienensis is a species of frog in the family Ranidae. It is found in Fujian (formerly romanized as "Fukien", hence the name), Zhejiang, and Jiangxi provinces of China as well as in Taiwan.

Its natural habitats are subtropical or tropical moist lowland forests, subtropical or tropical moist montane forests, swamps, freshwater marshes, rural gardens, heavily degraded former forest, water storage areas, ponds, irrigated land, seasonally flooded agricultural land, and canals and ditches. It is not considered threatened by the IUCN, though the Taiwanese populations have strongly declined.

Pelophylax fukienensis is a medium to large-sized frog, with males reaching 47 mm (1.9 in) and females 65 mm (2.6 in) length.
