= Pelophylax demarchii =

Conservation status
- Data Deficient (IUCN 3.1)

Scientific classification
- Kingdom: Animalia
- Phylum: Chordata
- Class: Amphibia
- Order: Anura
- Family: Ranidae
- Genus: Pelophylax
- Species: P. demarchii

Binomial name
- Pelophylax demarchii (Scortecci, 1929)

Synonyms
- Rana demarchii Scortecci, 1929; Euphlyctis demarchii — Poynton and Broadley, 1985; Limnonectes (Hoplobatrachus) demarchii — Dubois, 1987; Hoplobatrachus demarchii — Dubois, 1992; Rana (Pelophylax) demarchii — Kosuch, Vences, Dubois, Ohler, and Böhme, 2001; Hylarana demarchii — Chen, Murphy, Lathrop, Ngo, Orlov, Ho, and Somorjai, 2005

Species of frog

Pelophylax demarchii is a species of frog in the family Ranidae. It is only known from its unspecific type locality, Eritrea. Its taxonomic status is unclear. Common name Eritrea pond frog has been coined for it.

== Etymology ==
The specific name demarchii honours Marco De Marchi, an Italian naturalist, hydrobiologist, industrialist, and philanthropist.

== Taxonomy ==
Pelophylax demarchii was described by Italian herpetologist Giuseppe Scortecci based on two syntypes, of which one is lost. It is uncertain whether it is a valid species; it most closely resembles Pelophylax ridibundus and might be its synonym.

== Habitat and conservation ==
Ecological requirements, distribution, and current population status of this species are unknown. Consequently, it is listed as "data deficient" in the IUCN Red List of Threatened Species.
