= Klepton =

Aspect of reproductive biology

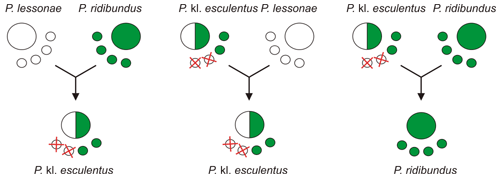
Klepton genetic inheritance in frogs

In biology, a klepton (abbreviated kl.) and synklepton (abbreviated sk.) is a species that requires input from another biological taxon (normally from a species which is closely related to the kleptonic species) to complete its reproductive cycle. Specific types of kleptons are zygokleptons, which reproduce by zygogenesis; gynokleptons which reproduce by gynogenesis, and tychokleptons, which reproduce by a combination of both systems.

Kleptogenic reproduction results in three potential outcomes:

- A unisexual female may simply activate cell division in the egg through the presence of a male's sperm without incorporating any of his genetic material—this results in the production of clonal offspring.
- The female may also incorporate the male's sperm into her egg, but can do so without excising any of her genetic material. This results in increased ploidy levels that range from triploid to pentaploid in wild individuals.
- Finally, the female also has the option of replacing some of her genetic material with that of the male's, resulting in a "hybrid" of sorts without increasing ploidy.

== Etymology ==
The term is derived from the (Ancient or Modern) Greek κλέπτ(ης), klépt(ēs), 'thief' + -on, after taxon, or kleptein, 'to steal'. A klepton "steals" from an exemplar of another species in order to reproduce. In a paper entitled "Taxonomy of Parthenogenetic Species of Hybrid Origin", Charles J. Cole argues that the thief motif closely parallels the behaviour of certain reptiles.

== Examples ==
=== Salamander species ===
In the wild, five species of Ambystoma salamanders contribute to a unisexual complex that reproduces via a combination of gynogenesis and kleptogenesis: A. tigrinum, A. barbouri, A. texanum, A. jeffersonium, and A. laterale. Over twenty genomic combinations have been found in nature, ranging from "LLJ" individuals (two A. laterale and an A. jeffersonium genome) to "LJTi" individuals (an A. laterale, A. jeffersonium, and an A. tigrinum genome). Every combination, however, contains the genetic information from the A. laterale species, and analysis of mitochondrial DNA has indicated that these unisexual species most likely diverged from an A. barbouri individual some 5 million years ago, making them the oldest known unisexual vertebrate species.

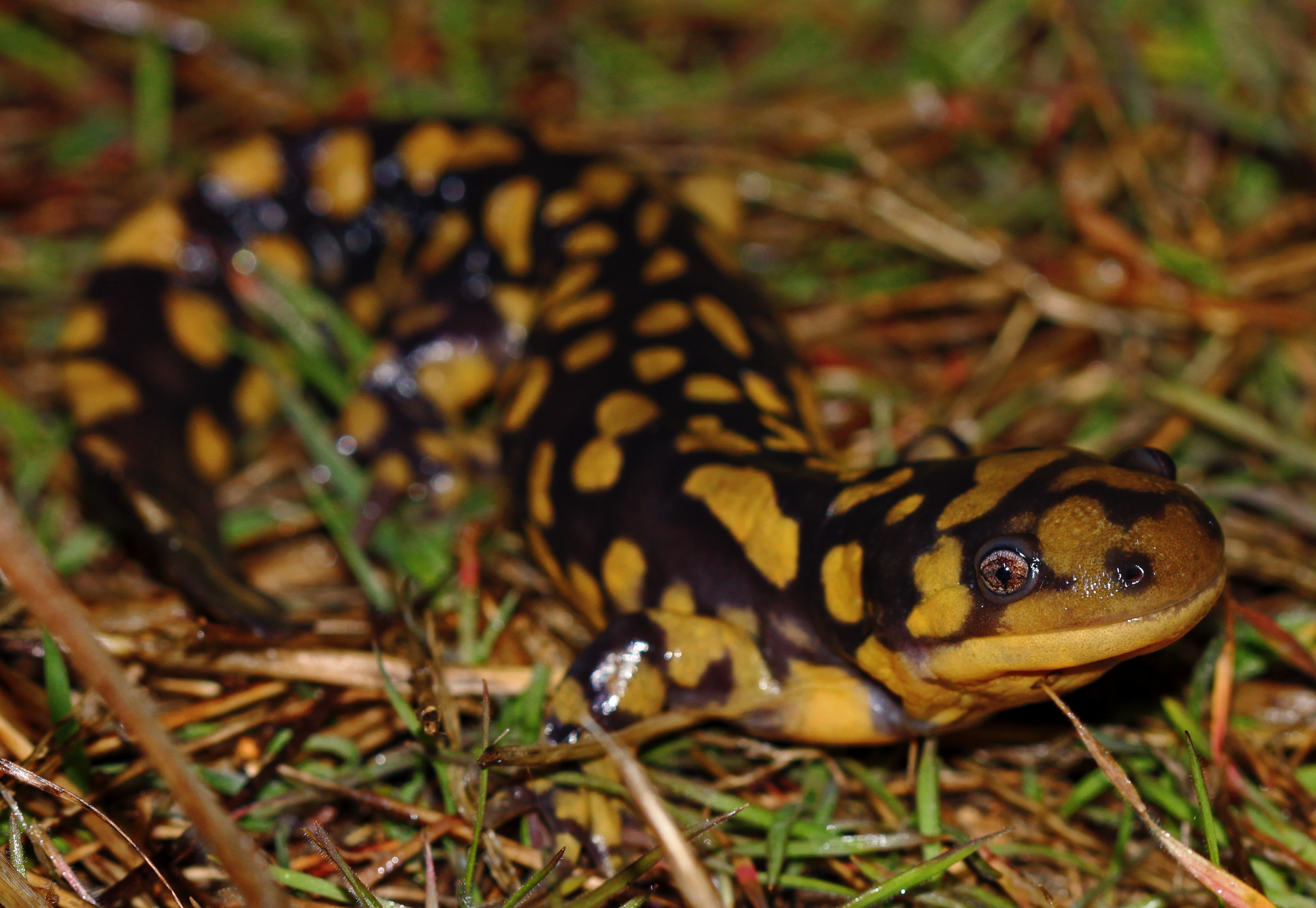
A. tigrinum

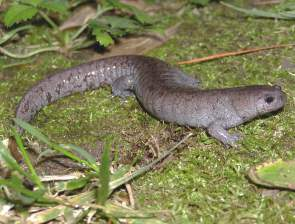
A. barbouri

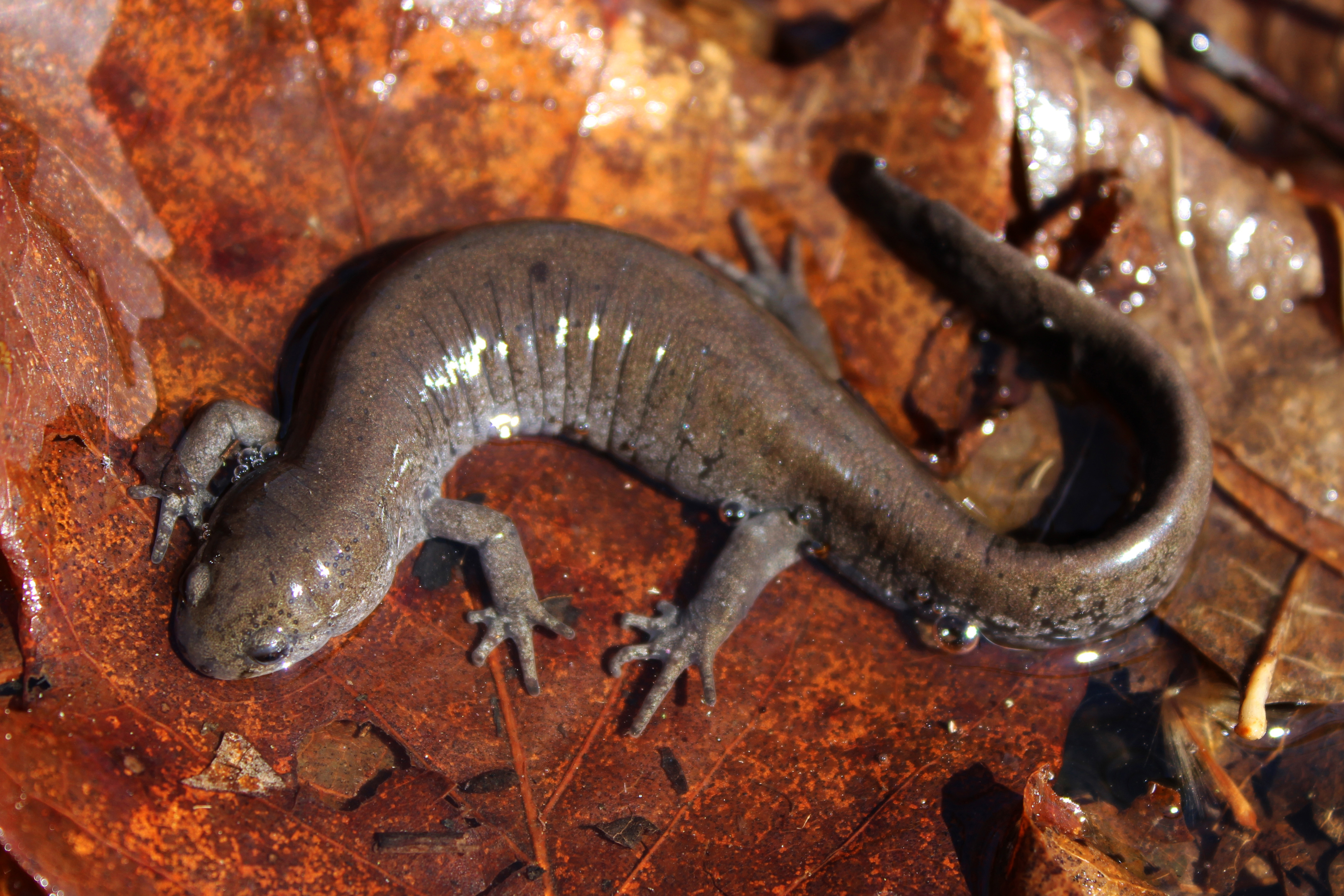
A. texanum

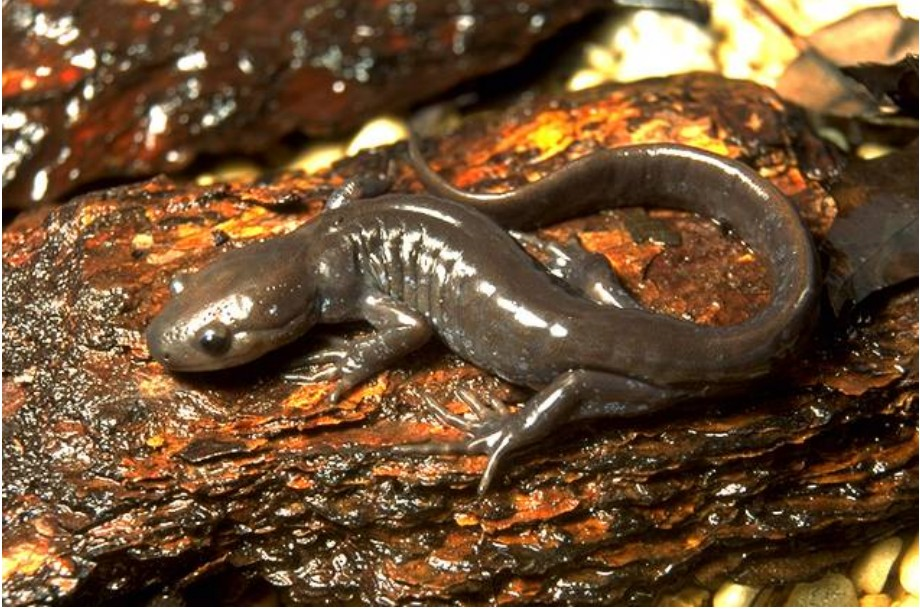
A. jeffersonianum

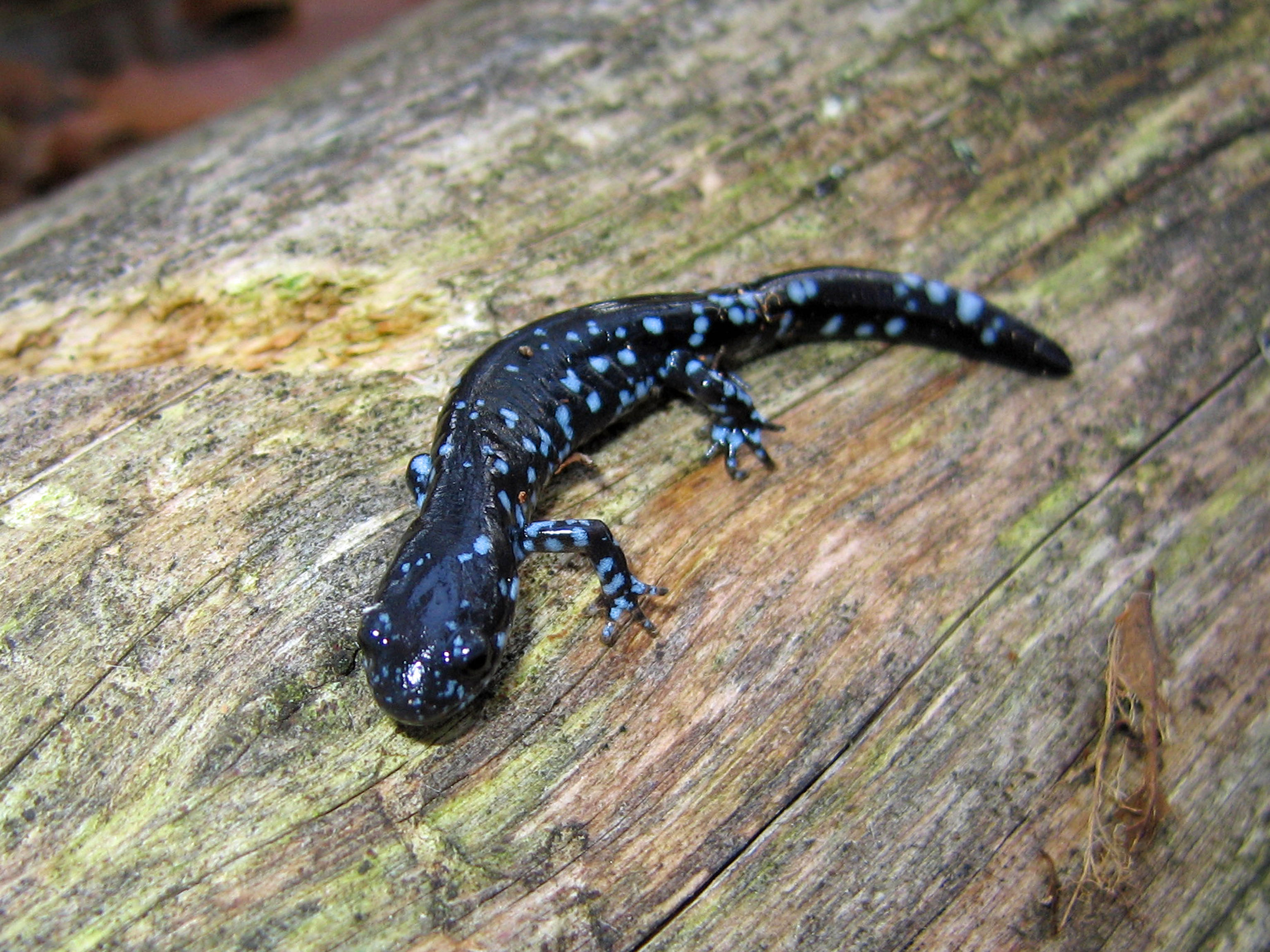
A. laterale

Five species of Ambystoma salamanders that reproduce by a combination of gynogenesis and kleptogenesis in the wild.

The fact that these salamanders have persisted for so long is remarkable, as it contradicts the notion that a majority of asexual lineages arise when the conditions are right and quickly disappear. It has been argued that this persistence is very much due to the aforementioned "genome replacement" strategy that accompanies kleptogenic reproduction—replacing a portion of the maternal genome with paternal DNA in offspring has allowed unisexual individuals to "refresh" their genetic material through time. This facet of kleptogenesis was recently ascertained from genetic research that indicates there is no ancestral A. laterale genome that is maintained from one unisexual to the next, and that there is not a specific "L" genome that is found more often than others. "L" genetic material found in these salamanders has also not evolved to be substantially unique from sexual genomes.

In 2007 Bogart et al found that, within a population, unisexual and sexual individuals are able to co-exist; that the genetic makeup of the unisexuals is highly variable; and that unisexual individuals share alleles with sexual individuals.

=== Frog species ===
Other species exhibiting the property include European water frogs of the genus Pelophylax.

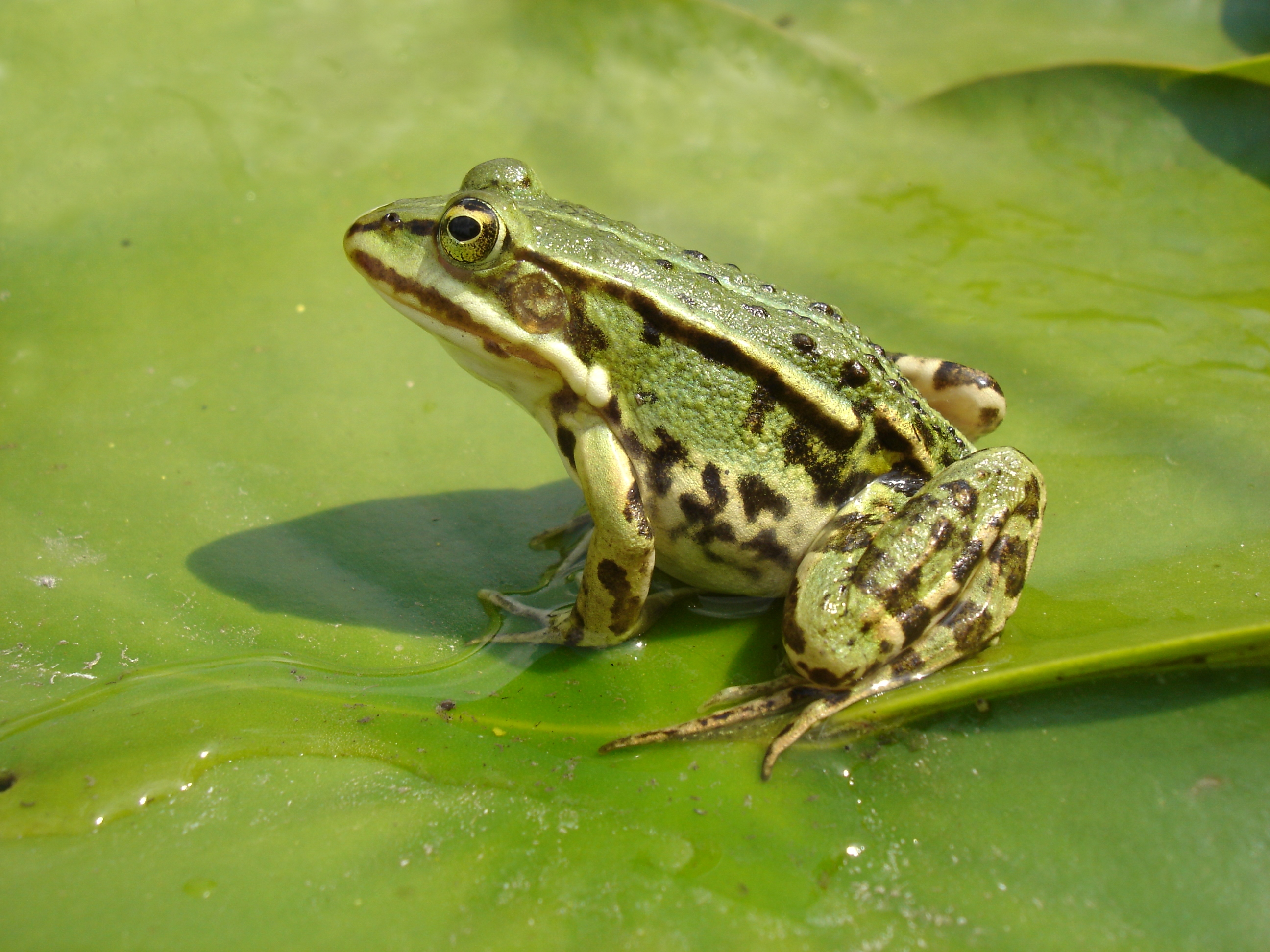
Pelophylax kl. esculentus
(P. lessonae × P. ridibundus)

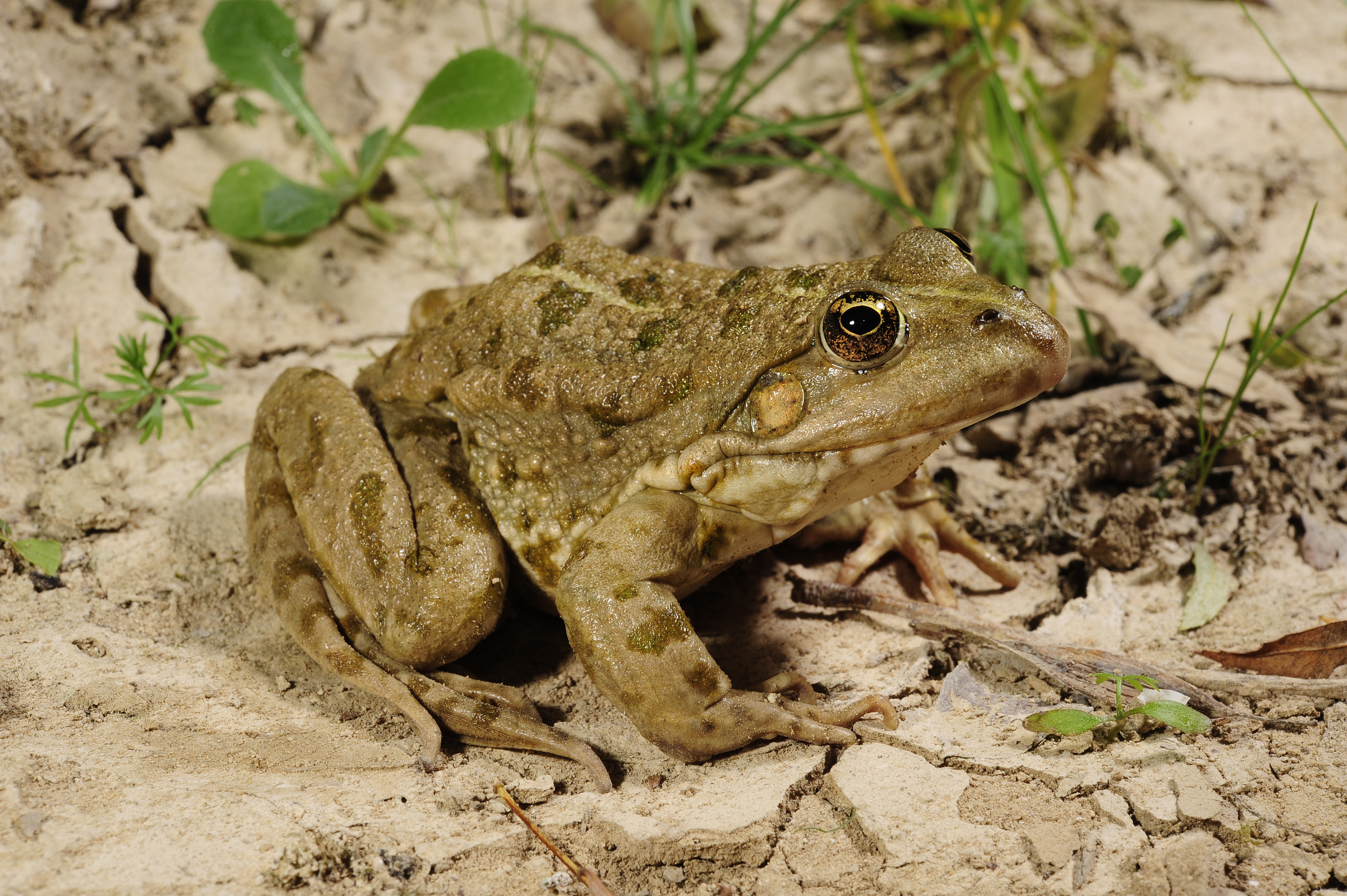
Pelophylax kl. grafi
(P. perezi × P. ridibundus)

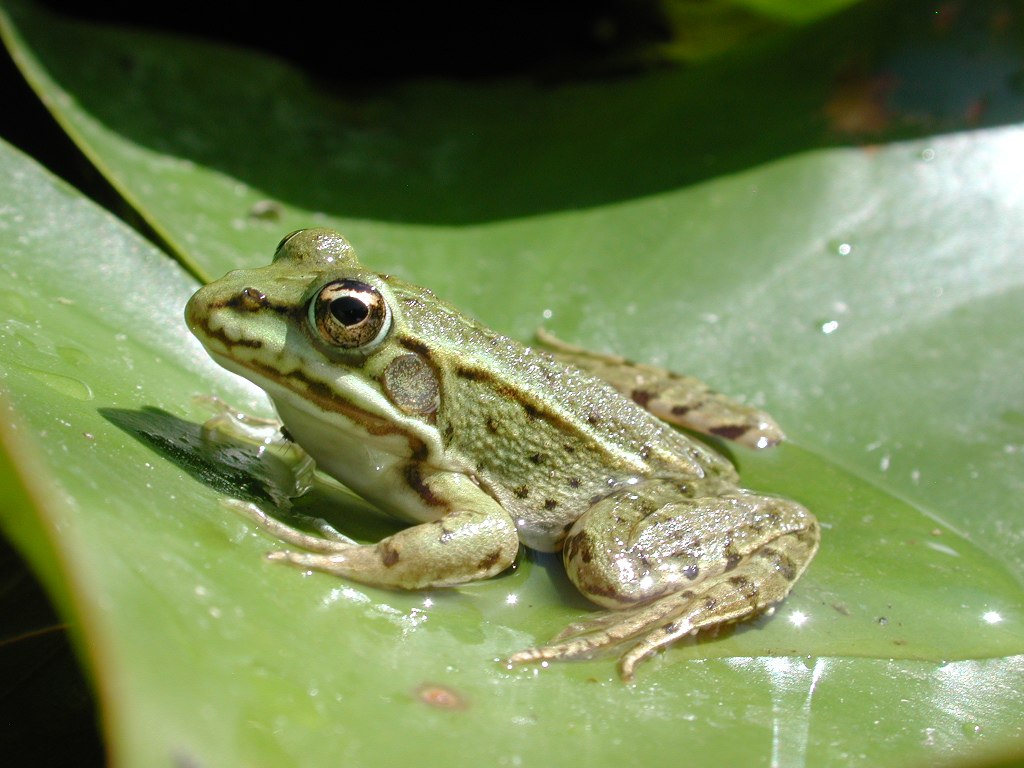
Pelophylax kl. hispanicus
(P. bergeri × P. ridibundus )

Three klepton species of Pelophylax found in Europe.

=== Fish species ===
The Amazon Molly (Poecilia formosa) exhibits gynogenesis.

== See also ==
- Eukaryotes, which can be unisexual or asexual
- Gametophytic apomixis, a phenomenon in plants that requires fertilization of the endosperm, but reproduction is clonal
- Gynogenesis
