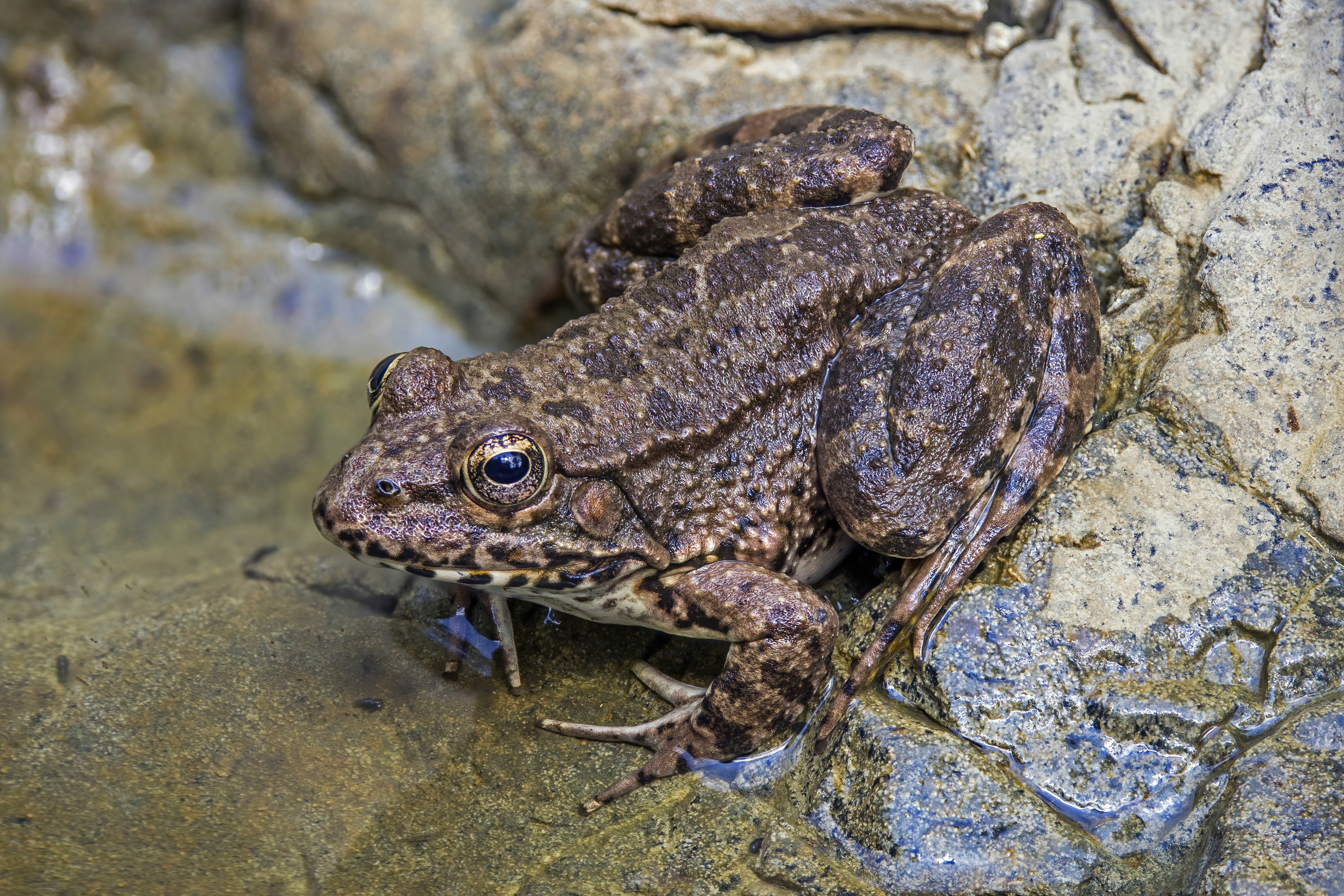
- Cyprus water frog P. cypriensis

Scientific classification
- Kingdom: Animalia
- Phylum: Chordata
- Class: Amphibia
- Order: Anura
- Family: Ranidae
- Genus: Pelophylax; Fitzinger, 1843

Type species
- Rana esculenta Linnaeus, 1758

Diversity
- 13-25 species, some of which are hybridogenic

Synonyms
- Baliopygus Schultze, 1891; "Palmirana" Ritgen, 1828 (nomen nudum)

= Pelophylax =

Pelophylax Temporal range: Early Oligocene–present

Genus of amphibians

Pelophylax is a genus of true frogs widespread in Eurasia, with a few species ranging into northern Africa. This genus was erected by Leopold Fitzinger in 1843 to accommodate the green frogs of the Old World, which he considered distinct from the brown pond frogs of Carl Linnaeus' genus Rana.

They are also known as water frogs, as they spend much of the summer living in aquatic habitat; the pond frogs can be found more often, by comparison, on dry land, as long as there is sufficient humidity. Yet there are species of Eurasian green frogs – the Central Asian P. terentievi, or the Sahara frog (P. saharicus) – which inhabit waterholes in the desert.

== Systematics and taxonomy ==
Parent species of Graf's hybrid frog, P. kl. grafi

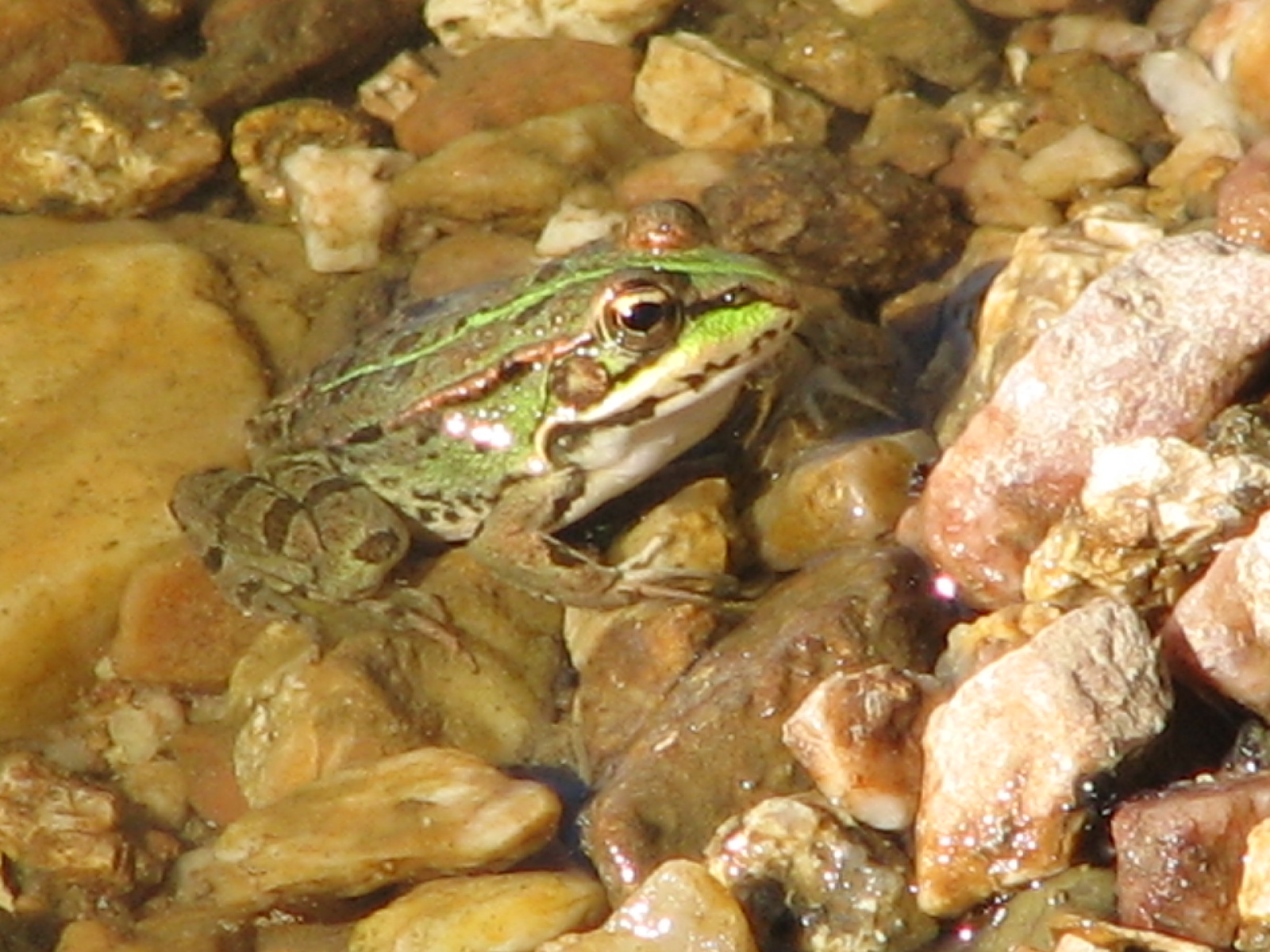
Perez's frog, P. perezi

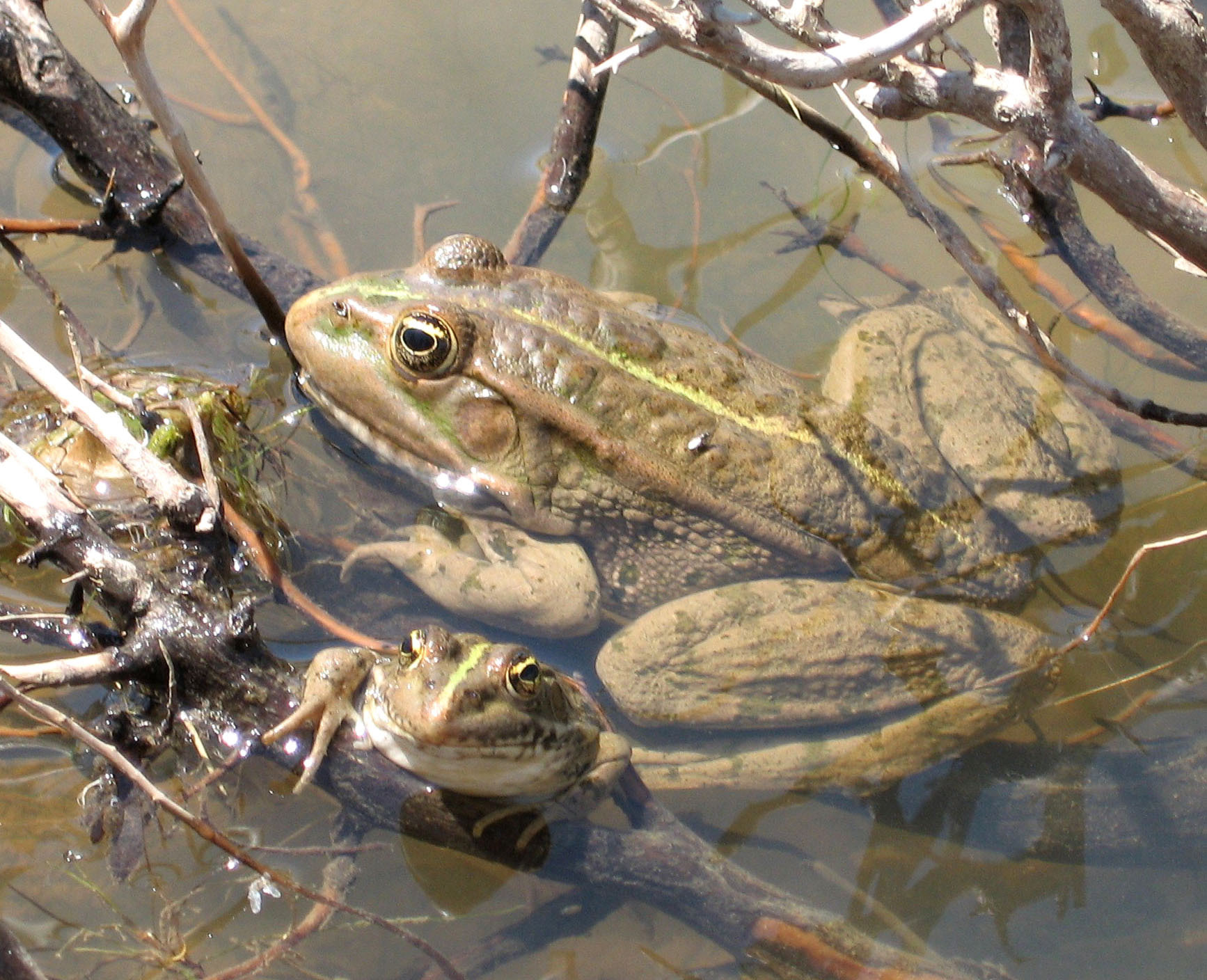
Marsh frog, P. ridibundus

Most authors throughout the 19th and 20th century disagreed with Fitzinger's assessment. The green frogs were included again with the brown frogs, in line with the tendency to place any frog similar in habitus to the common frog (R. temporaria) in Rana. That genus, in the loose circumscription, eventually became a sort of "wastebin taxon".

Around 2000, with molecular phylogenetic studies becoming commonplace, it was discovered that Fitzinger's assessment was correct after all – not only is Pelophylax an independent genus, but it does in fact belong to a lineage of Raninae not particularly close to Rana. But it also turned out that these Eurasian green frogs might not form a monophyletic lineage. The sheer number of species involved in the group of Pelophylax and its closest relatives means that it will probably be some time until the definite circumscription of this genus is resolved.

The Pelophylax frogs belong to a group of moderately advanced Raninae – possibly a clade – that also includes such genera as Babina, Glandirana, Hylarana, Pulchrana, Sanguirana, Sylvirana, as well as Hydrophylax which like Pelophylax is suspected of being not monophyletic. These genera were formerly also included in Rana by most authors, and several of them have only been established in the 1990s. And as regards the possible paraphyly of Pelophylax, it seems that some species assigned there are very close to Hylarana, and thus it might simply be a matter of moving them to that genus. But hybridogenic speciation is running rampant in the Old World green frogs, and this obfuscates the data gained from DNA sequence analyses.

=== Evolution ===
The extinct P. pueyoi from the Miocene of Spain

Pelophylax is a rather old and well-represented genus, with articulated fossils from Europe known as far back as the Early Oligocene. It has been theorized that Pelophylax originated in Asia no later than 5 million years before the earliest known fossils, and then dispersed west. It may have colonized Europe in the wake of a cooling/drying trend and the resulting Eocene-Oligocene extinction event, as part of an overall replacement of Europe's previously tropical frog fauna of African origin (such as the pyxicephalid Thaumastosaurus) by a more temperate fauna of Asian origin. Further allowing for this migration would have been the drying out of the Turgai Strait at the same time, which formerly served as a barrier between northern Asia and Europe.

Following the establishment of Pelophylax in Europe, their diversification appears to have been based around the expansion and contraction of the Paratethys Sea, which served as a geographic barrier to the dispersal of many taxa.

==== Fossils ====
The oldest Pelophylax specimen is an articulated but headless specimen known from the earliest Oligocene of Chartres-de-Bretagne, France, which appears to be from the Pelophylax kl. esculentus hybrid complex. The species P. aquensis (formerly Rana aquensis) is known from the Late Oligocene of southern France, and fossil species become more common during the Miocene.

=== Species ===
Including named klepta (hybridogenic species), Pelophylax sensu lato contained 25 species. However, more recent lumps have reduced this to 13 species, subsuming many of the former small-range endemic species of eastern Europe and west Asia into P. ridibundus.

The following species have been variously suggested:

- Pelophylax bedriagae – Levant water frog (now lumped with P. ridibundus)
- Pelophylax bergeri – Italian pool frog (now lumped with P. lessonae)
- Pelophylax caralitanus (Arikan, 1988) (now lumped with P. ridibundus)
- Pelophylax cerigensis – Karpathos frog (now lumped with P. ridibundus)
- Pelophylax chosenicus – Seoul frog (now lumped with P. plancyi)
- Pelophylax cretensis – Cretan frog
- Pelophylax cypriensis – Cyprus water frog (now lumped with P. ridibundus)
- Pelophylax demarchii (validity and taxonomic status unclear; klepton?)
- Pelophylax epeiroticus – Epirus water frog
- Pelophylax fukienensis (formerly in P. plancyi)
- Pelophylax hubeiensis (now lumped with P. plancyi)
- Pelophylax kurtmuelleri – Balkan frog (now lumped with P. ridibundus)
- Pelophylax lessonae – pool frog
- Pelophylax mongolius – Yellow River frog
- Pelophylax nigromaculatus – dark-spotted frog (may include P. tenggerensis)
- Pelophylax perezi – Perez's frog
- Pelophylax persicus – Persian marsh frog (now lumped with P. ridibundus)
- Pelophylax plancyi – eastern golden frog
- Pelophylax porosus – Daruma pond frog
- Pelophylax ridibundus – marsh frog
- Pelophylax saharicus – Sahara frog
- Pelophylax shqipericus – Albanian water frog
- Pelophylax tenggerensis (now lumped with P. mongolius)
- Pelophylax terentievi (now lumped with P. ridibundus)

Named klepta (hybridogenic species) of Pelophylax are:

- Pelophylax kl. esculentus – edible frog (P. lessonae × P. ridibundus)
- Pelophylax kl. grafi – Graf's hybrid frog (P. perezi × P. ridibundus)
- Pelophylax kl. hispanicus – Italian edible frog (P. bergeri × P. ridibundus / P. kl. esculentus)

In addition, one species has been described that is sometimes assigned to Pelophylax, but must be considered a nomen oblitum:

- "Hyla" ranaeformis Laurenti, 1768 (= "Hyla gibbosa" Lacépède, 1788 (unavailable: published in non-binomial work) )

The following fossil species are also known:

- †Pelophylax aquensis (Late Oligocene of France)
- †Pelophylax barani (Middle/Late Miocene of Turkey)
- †Pelophylax meriani (Early Miocene of Germany)
- †Pelophylax pueyoi (Late Miocene of Spain)
- †Pelophylax quellenbergi (Late Miocene of Spain)

== Invasiveness ==
Due to mass transport of Anatolian (P. r. bedriagae) and Balkan (P. r. ridibundus and P. r. kurtmuelleri) marsh frogs around Europe to breed for frog legs, these lineages of marsh frogs have become an unnoticed but widespread invasive species throughout Europe and northern Africa, invading habitats where they were not previously found and threatening other amphibian taxa, including native Pelophylax species/genotypes. This transport may potentially represent one of the largest amphibian invasions worldwide, despite being largely overlooked due to the close similarity between native and introduced Pelophylax. In addition, P. perezi has become an introduced species on the Azores, Balearic, Canary, and Madeira Islands. A similar situation among introduced Pelophylax may exist in China.

== See also ==
- Hybridogenesis in water frogs
