= Pelophylax pueyoi =

Pelophylax pueyoi Temporal range: Late Miocene
- Fossil at Naturalis Biodiversity Center

Scientific classification
- Kingdom: Animalia
- Phylum: Chordata
- Class: Amphibia
- Order: Anura
- Family: Ranidae
- Genus: Pelophylax
- Species: †P. pueyoi

Binomial name
- †Pelophylax pueyoi (Navás, 1922)

Synonyms
- Rana pueyoi Navás, 1922

Extinct species of amphibian

Pelophylax pueyoi is an extinct species of large frog from Late Miocene of Spain. Initially classified as a member of the "green frog" complex within the genus Rana, it has since been reclassified into the genus Pelophylax as that genus has been split from Rana.

It is known from a Konservat-Lagerstätte in the Libros sulphur mines of Teruel, where it is abundant. Fossils of both adults and tadpoles are known.

Rana pueyoi
