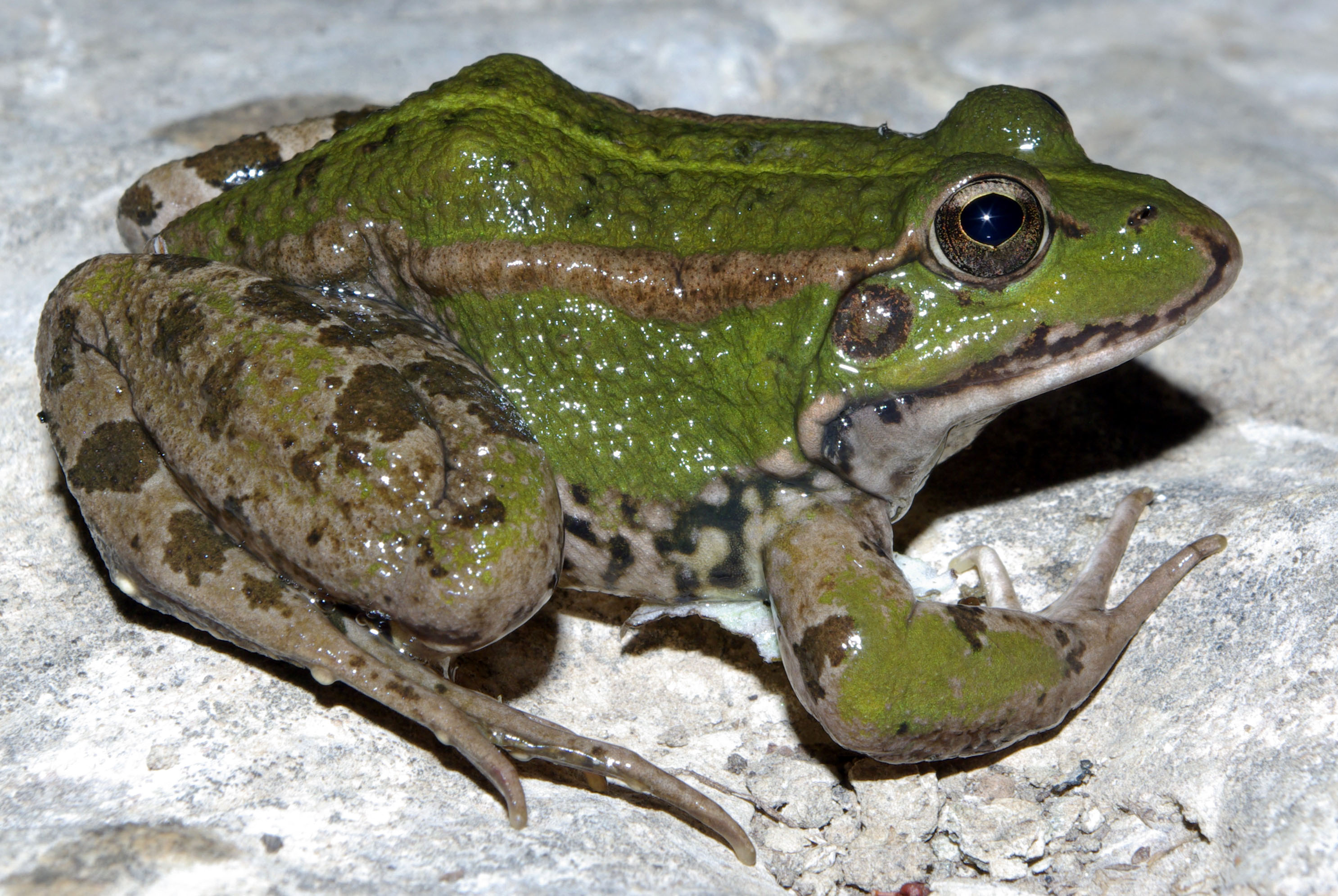
- Adult in Sargentes de la Lora, Spain

Conservation status
- Least Concern (IUCN 3.1)

Scientific classification
- Kingdom: Animalia
- Phylum: Chordata
- Class: Amphibia
- Order: Anura
- Family: Ranidae
- Genus: Pelophylax
- Species: P. perezi

Binomial name
- Pelophylax perezi (López-Seoane, 1885)
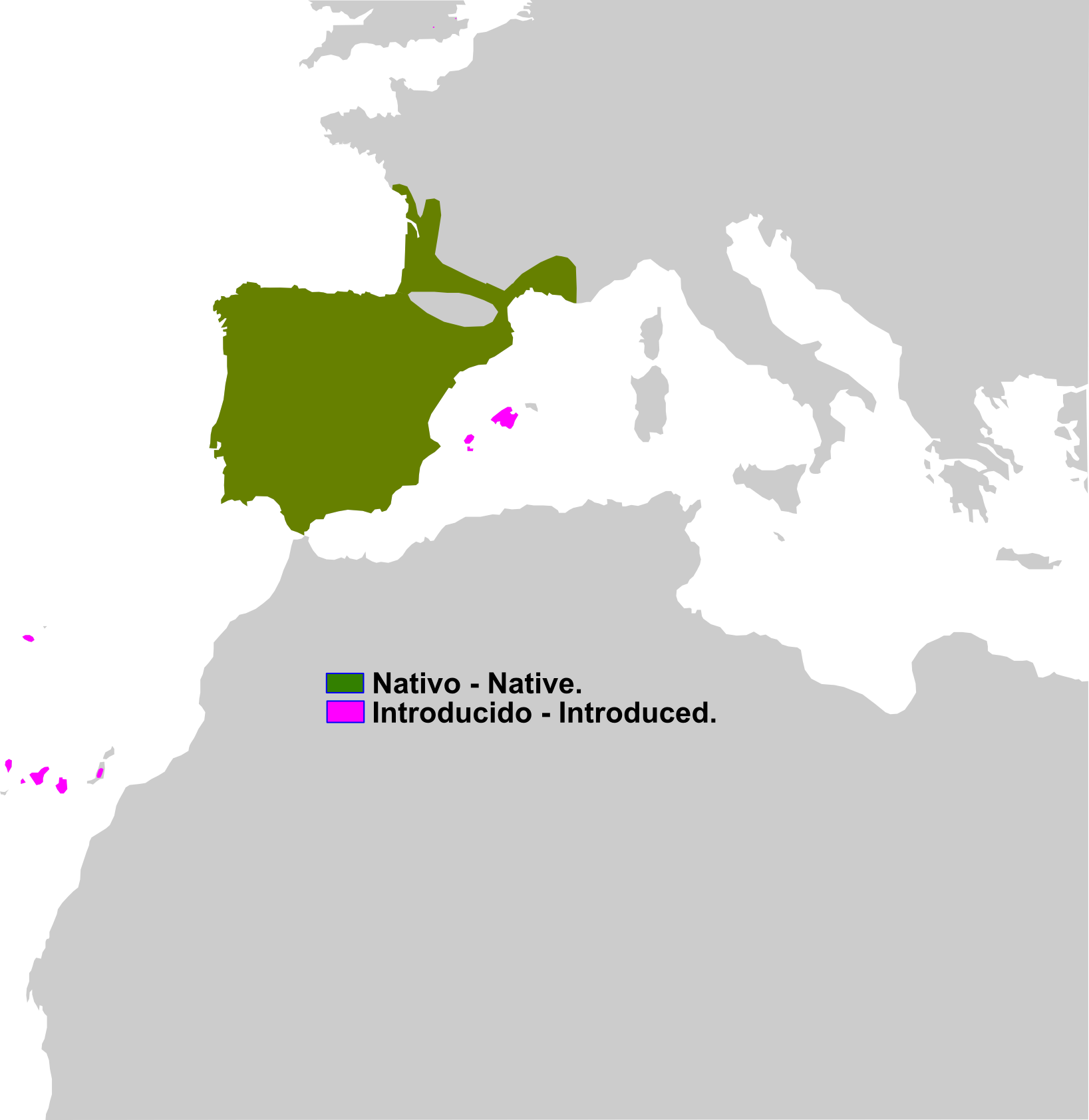

Synonyms
- List: Rana esculenta perezi López-Seoane, 1885; Rana ridibunda perezi (López-Seoane, 1885) Mertens, 1925; Rana perezi (López-Seoane, 1885) Hotz, 1974; Rana (Pelophylax) perezi (López-Seoane, 1885) Dubois, 1992; Hylarana perezi (López-Seoane, 1885) Chen, Murphy, Lathrop, Ngo, Orlov, Ho, and Somorjai, 2005

= Perez's frog =

Species of amphibian

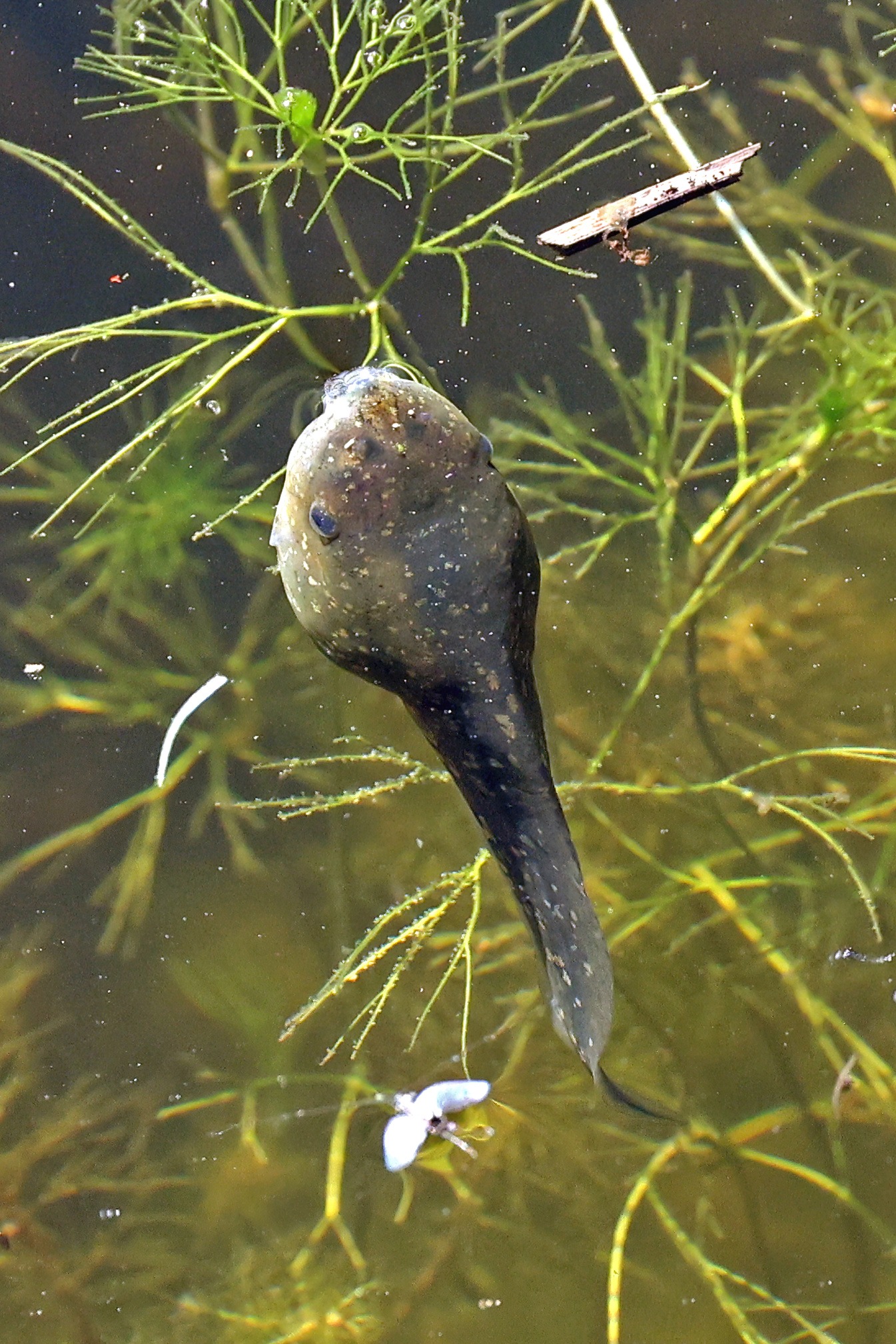
tadpole

The Perez's frog (Pelophylax perezi), also known as Iberian waterfrog, Iberian green frog or Coruna frog, is a species of frog in the family Ranidae. It is native to southern France, Portugal, Spain, and has been introduced to the Canary and Balearic Islands, Madeira, the United Kingdom, and the Azores. In the Iberian Peninsula it is widespread and common.

Its natural habitats are temperate forests, temperate shrubland, Mediterranean-type shrubby vegetation, rivers, intermittent rivers, swamps, freshwater lakes, intermittent freshwater lakes, freshwater marshes, intermittent freshwater marshes, sandy shores, arable land, and urban areas. It is not considered threatened by the IUCN.

== Taxonomy and evolution ==
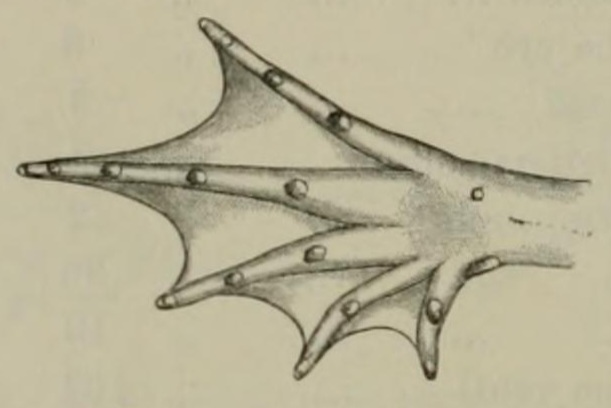
Illustration of the foot of a Perez's frog by Victor Lópe-Seoane published in the 1885 paper which first described the frog

The Perez's frog was first described in 1885 by Spanish naturalist Victor López-Seoane, who believed it was a subspecies of the edible frog and gave it the scientific name Rana esculenta perezi in honour of his friend and fellow zoologist Laureano Pérez Arcas. López-Seoane studied multiple specimens collected across northwest Spain and Portugal, but did not designate any as a holotype. Therefore, one of these specimens (an adult female collected in A Coruña, Spain and kept in the Museum of Comparative Zoology under the specimen number MCZ 6832) was designed as the lectotype in 1995. Some later authors considered the Perez's frog to be a subspecies of the marsh frog rather than the edible frog, with German herpetologist Robert Mertens being the first to do so, referring to it as Rana ridibunda perezi in 1925. Mertens would use this name again in a book he coauthored with German zoologist Heinz Wermuth in 1960, though a paper published in 1929 lists it as merely a junior synonym of Rana esculenta perezi.

Scientists would eventually come to realize that the Perez's frog is not a subspecies but a distinct species different from other known frogs. The first to propose this was Swiss herpetologist Hansjürg Hotz, who therefore referred to it as Rana perezi in 1974, and this classification would then be followed in a biochemical study published in 1977. In 1992, French zoologist Alain Dubois divided the genus Rana into 33 subgenera, with the Perez's frog being placed in the subgenus Pelophylax under the name Rana (Pelophylax) perezi. A study published in 2005 further divided the species placed in the genus Rana at the time into several different genera, with those of the subgenus Pelophylax being assigned to the genus Hylarana, thus the Perez's frog was considered to be part of this genus under the name Hylarana perezi. In 2006, another publication on amphibian taxonomy elevated the rank of Pelophylax from subgenus to genus, a revision which is further supported by a study published the following year, so the scientific name of the Perez's frog was recombined once again into Pelophylax perezi.

The Perez's frog belongs to the genus Pelophylax, which is widely distributed across Eurasia, and genetic analysis has revealed that it is more closely related to other European members of this genus than to any of the east Asian species. However, its closest living relative is the Sahara frog (P. saharicus) found in northern Africa. A study published in 2024 found that the lineages of these two species diverged approximately either 16 million years ago (during the end of the Burdigalian age of the Miocene) or 5.3 million years ago (during the Zanclean age of the Pliocene). The former time estimate coincides with the Betic Crisis (when sea level rise and saline lakes fragmented the Iberian Peninsula), while the latter coincides with the Messinian salinity crisis (when the Mediterranean Sea dried up), suggesting that one of these events triggered the divergence of the two lineages. The following cladogram shows the position of the Perez's frog among its closest living relatives according to Dufresnes et al. (2024):

- Pelophylax Western Palearctic
  - - - - P. ridibundus marsh frogs
          ⊞Show taxa
          ⊟
          - - P. r. bedriagae
            - - P. r. kurtmuelleri
              - P. r. ridibundus
          - - cf. ridibundus lineages
              - - - P. r. persicus
                  - P. r. terentievi
                - - P. r. caralitanus
                  - - cf. ridibundus
                    - P. r. cerigensis
              - cf. ridibundus
            - P. r. cypriensis
        - P. cretensis
      - P. epeiroticus
    - pool frogs
      - P. lessonae
        - P. l. lessonae
        - P. l. bergeri
      - P. shqipericus
  - - P. perezi
    - P. saharicus

== See also ==
- Hybridogenesis in water frogs
