= Plagiorchiidae =

Scientific classification
- Kingdom: Animalia
- Phylum: Platyhelminthes
- Class: Trematoda
- Order: Plagiorchiida
- Suborder: Xiphidiata
- Superfamily: Plagiorchioidea
- Family: Plagiorchiidae; Lühe, 1901

Genera
- Enodiotrema Looss, 1900; Glossimetra Mehra, 1937; Plagiorchis Lühe, 1899

Synonyms
- Enodiotrematinae Baer, 1924

Family of flukes

Plagiorchiidae is a family of parasitic trematodes (flukes) in the order Plagiorchiida.
