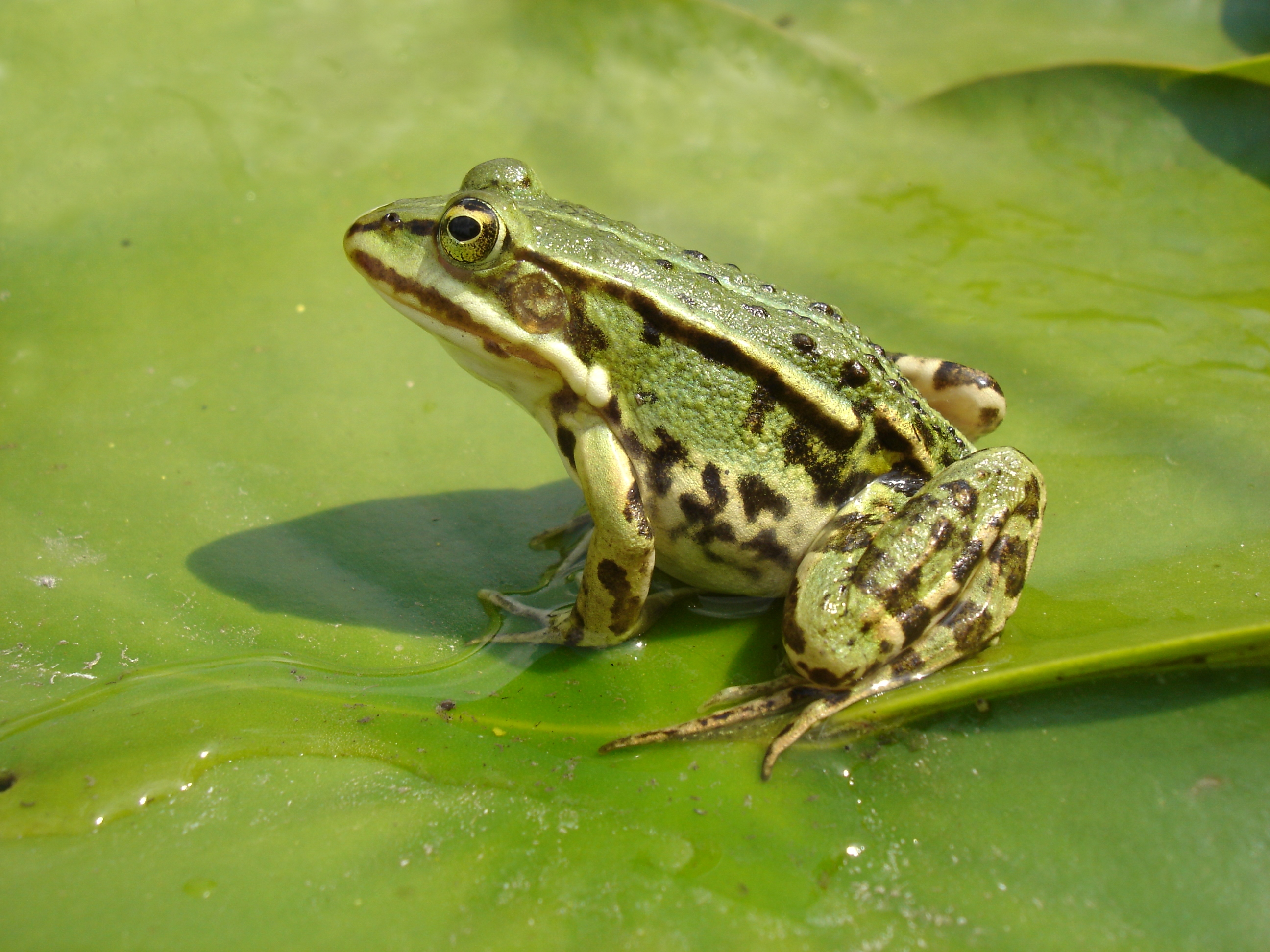

Scientific classification
- Kingdom: Animalia
- Phylum: Chordata
- Class: Amphibia
- Order: Anura
- Family: Ranidae
- Genus: Pelophylax
- Species: P. lessonae × P. ridibundus

Binomial name
- Pelophylax kl. esculentus (Linnaeus, 1758)

Synonyms
- Pelophylax esculentus (Linnaeus, 1758); Rana esculenta Linnaeus, 1758

= Edible frog =

Species of amphibian

Sounds made by edible frogs

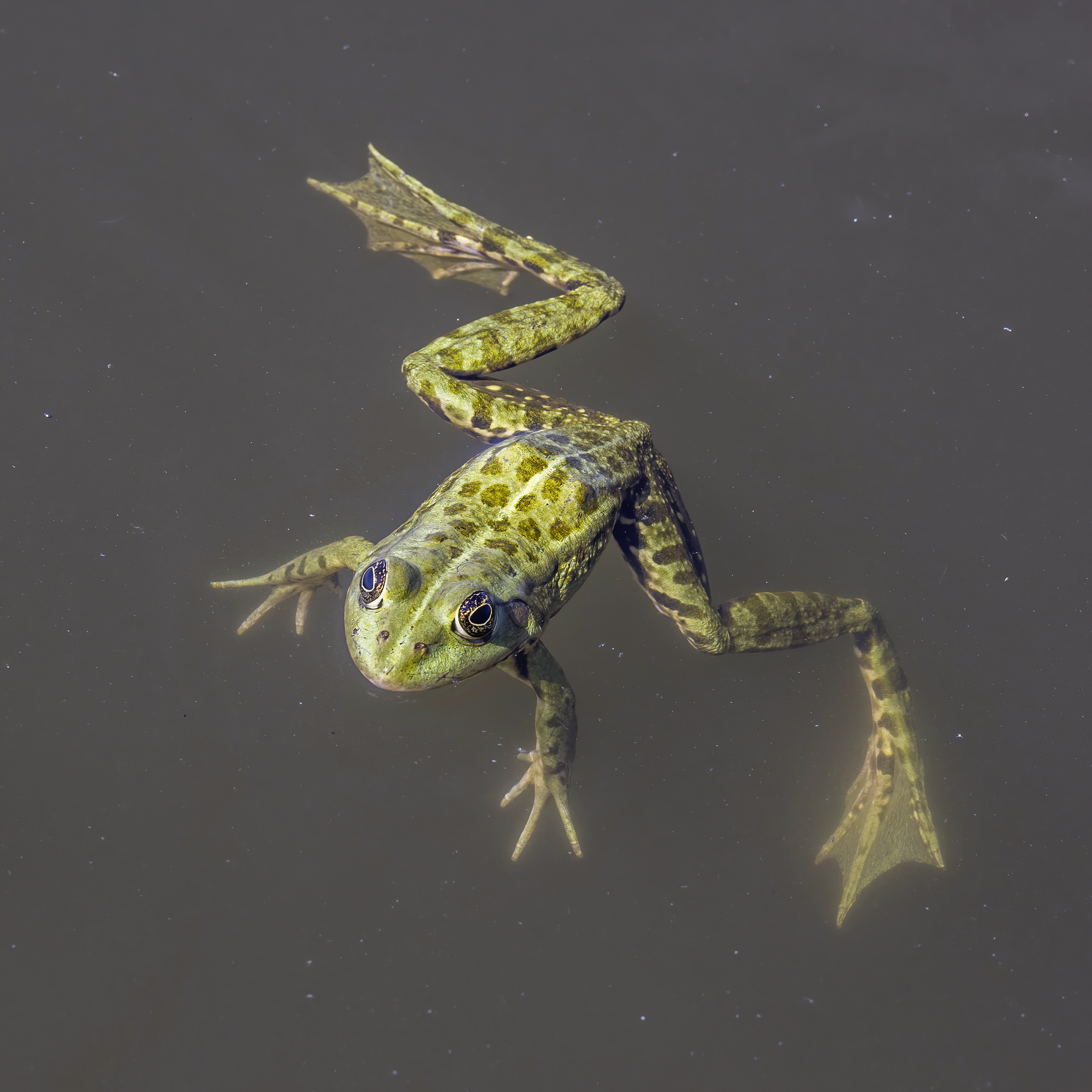
Pelophylax esculentus complex

The edible frog (Pelophylax kl. esculentus) is a hybrid species of common European frog, also known as the common water frog or green frog (however, this latter term is also used for the North American species Rana clamitans).

It is used for food, particularly in France as well as Germany and Italy, for the delicacy frog legs. Females are between 5 and 9 cm (2.0 and 3.5 in) long, males between 6 and 11 cm (2.4 and 4.3 in).

This widespread and common frog has many common names, including European dark-spotted frog, European black-spotted pond frog, and European black-spotted frog.

== Distribution ==
Pelophylax esculentus is endemic to Europe. It naturally occurs from the northern half of France to western Russia, and from Estonia and Denmark to Bulgaria and northern Italy. The edible frog is introduced in Spain, Norway and the United Kingdom. The natural range is nearly identical to that of P. lessonae.

== Hybridogenesis ==
Pelophylax kl. esculentus is the fertile hybrid of the pool frog (Pelophylax lessonae) and the marsh frog (Pelophylax ridibundus). It reproduces by hybridogenesis (hemiclonally).

Hybridogenesis implies that during gametogenesis hybrids (of RL genotype) exclude one parental genome (L or R) and produce gametes with an unrecombined genome of the other parental species (R or L, respectively), instead of containing mixed recombined parental genomes. The hybrid populations are usually propagated by mating (backcrosses) with a sympatric parental species – P. lessonae (LL) or P. ridibundus (RR) – providing the second, discarded parental genome (L or R respectively). Hybridogenesis is thus a hemiclonal mode of reproduction; half of the genome is transmitted to the next generation clonally, unrecombined (intact); the other half sexually, recombined.

For example, in the most widespread so called L–E system, edible frogs Pelophylax kl. esculentus (RE) produce gametes of the marsh frog P. ridibundus (R) and mate with coexisting pool frogs Pelophylax lessonae (L gametes) – see below in the middle.

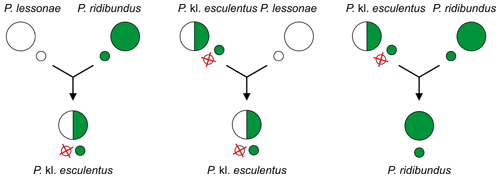
Example crosses between pool frog (Pelophylax lessonae), marsh frog (P. ridibundus) and their hybrid, edible frog (P. kl. esculentus). The first is the primary hybridisation generating the hybrid; the second is the most widespread type of hybridogenesis.

Because this hybrid requires another taxon as a sexual host to reproduce, usually one of the parental species, it is a klepton, hence the addition of the "kl." (for klepton) in the species name.

There are also known all-hybrid populations, where diploid hybrids (LR) coexist with triploid (LLR or LRR) hybrids, providing L or R genomes respectively. In this situation, diploid hybrids (LR) generate not only haploid R or L gametes, but also the diploid gametes (RL) needed to recreate triploids.

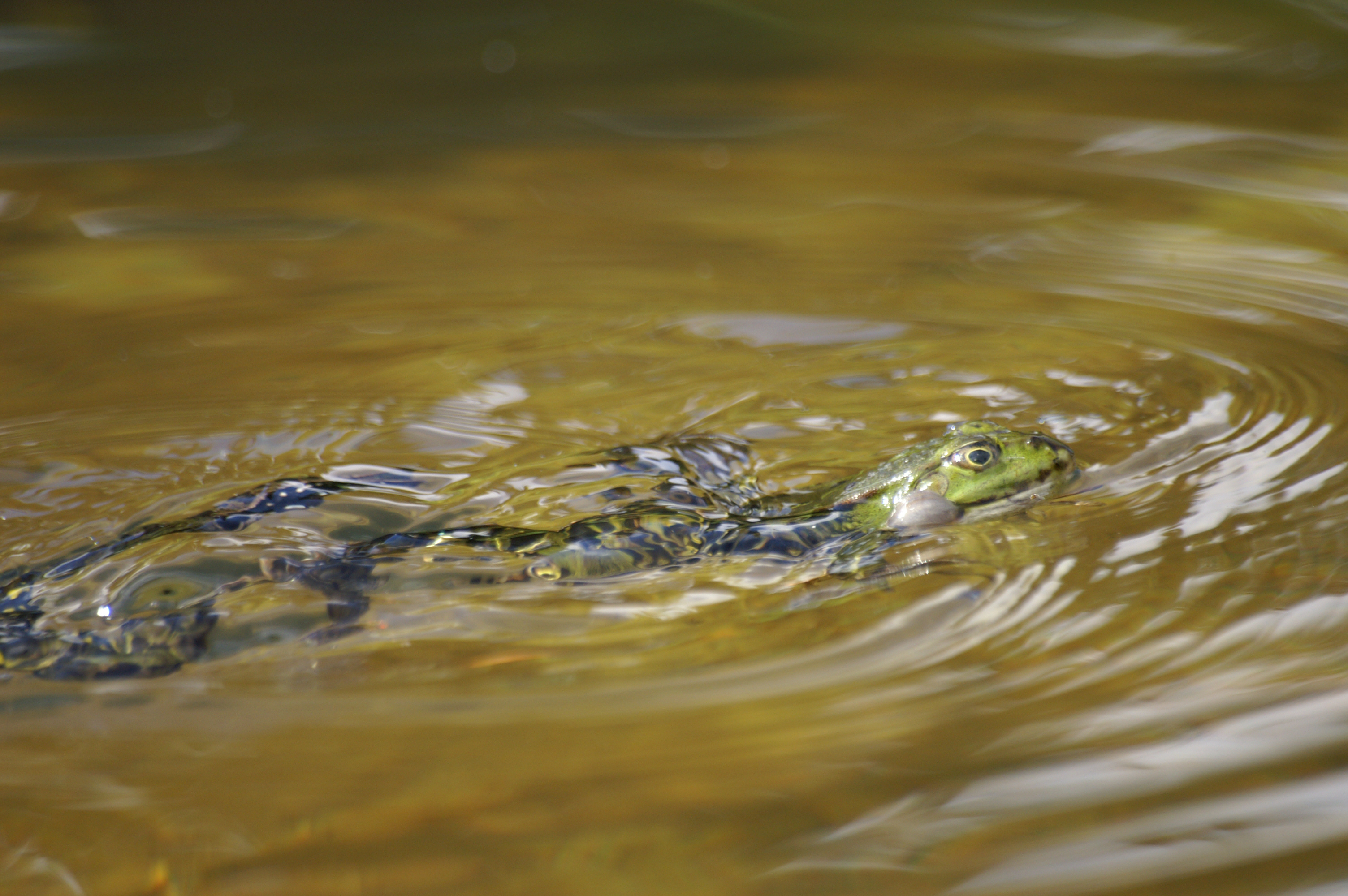
Swimming frog

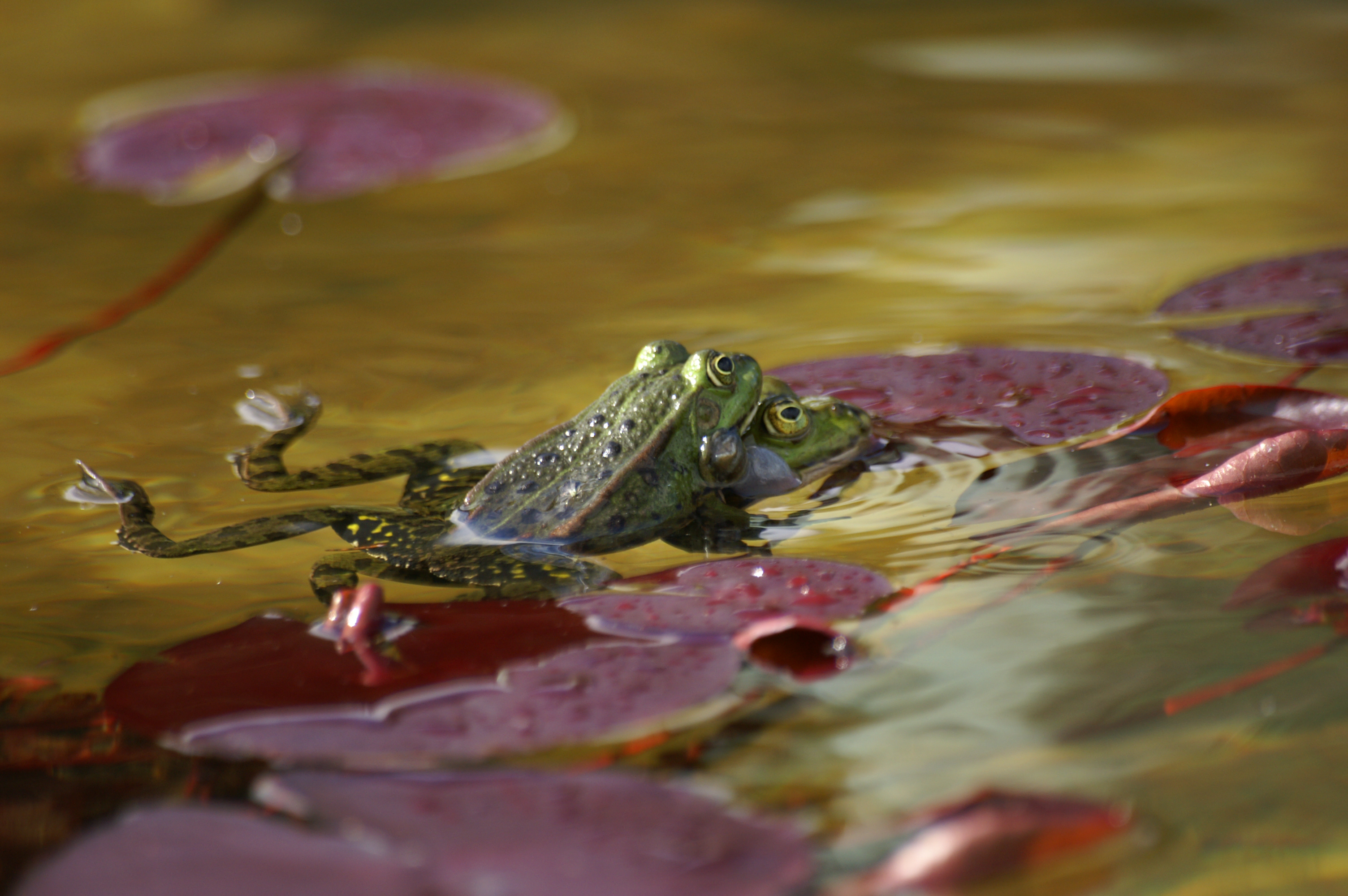
Attempted copulation between two males

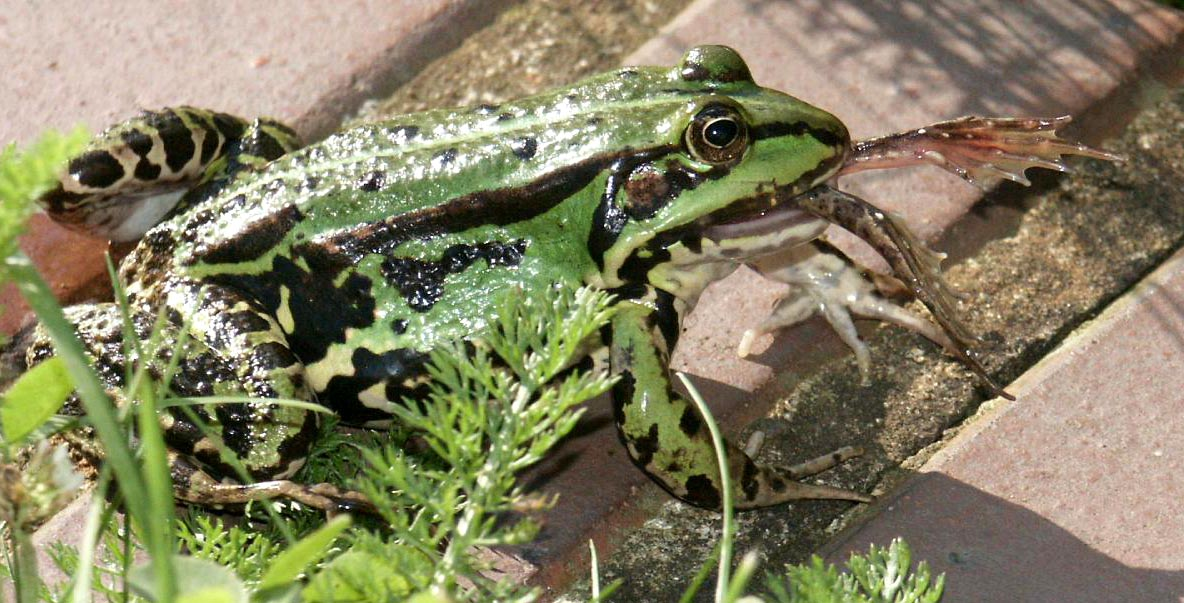
Example of cannibalism

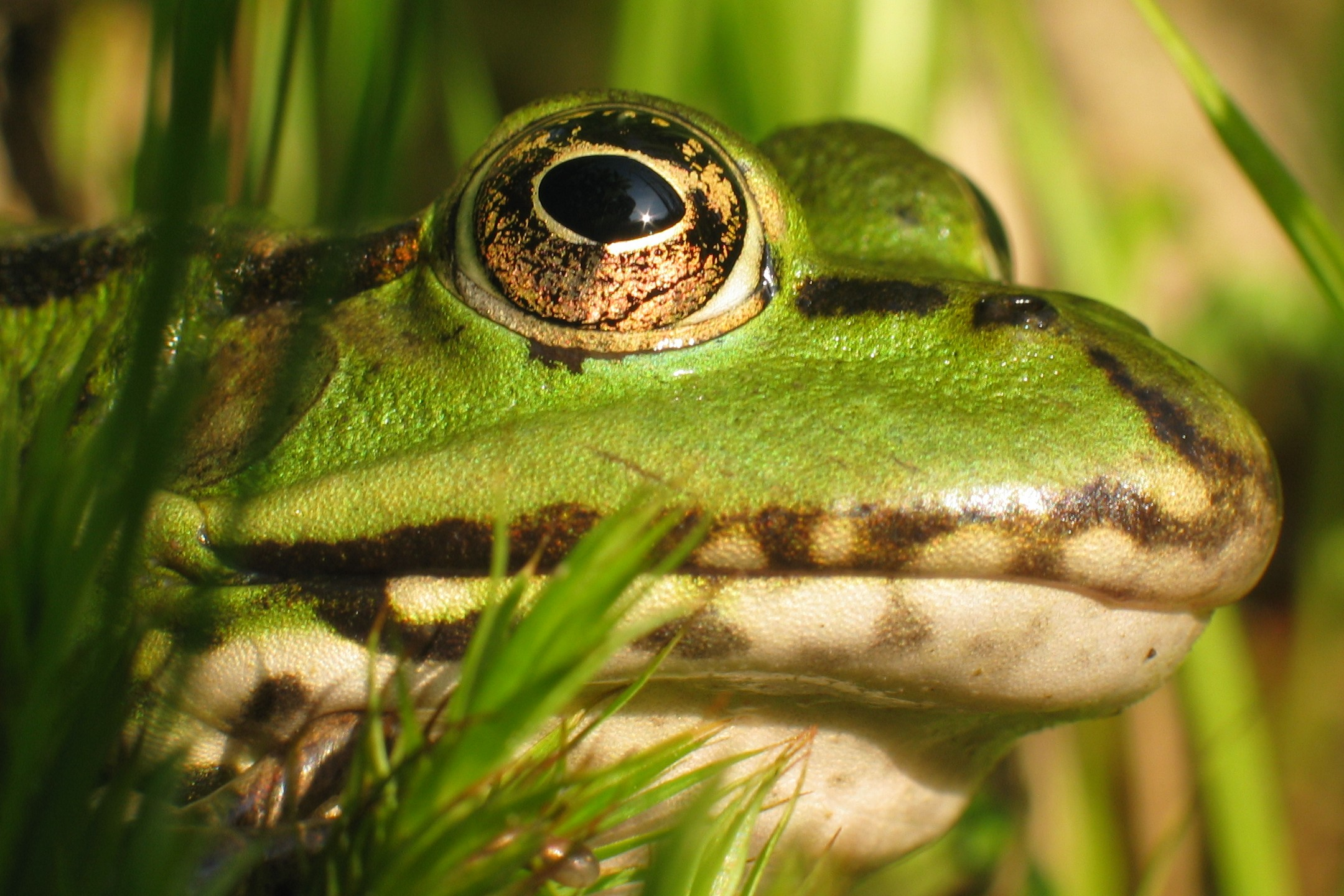
Close-up of head

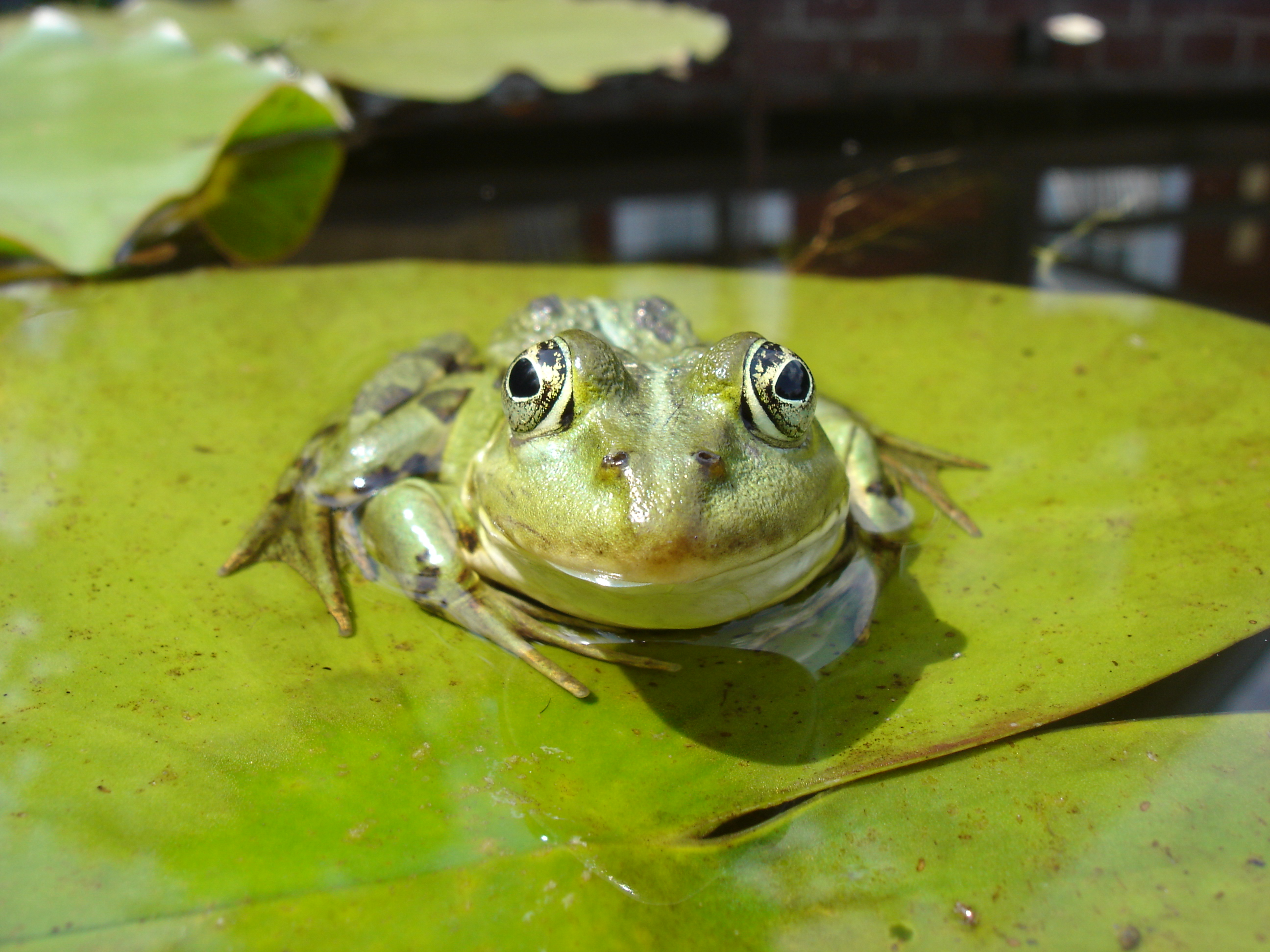
Head close-up, another perspective

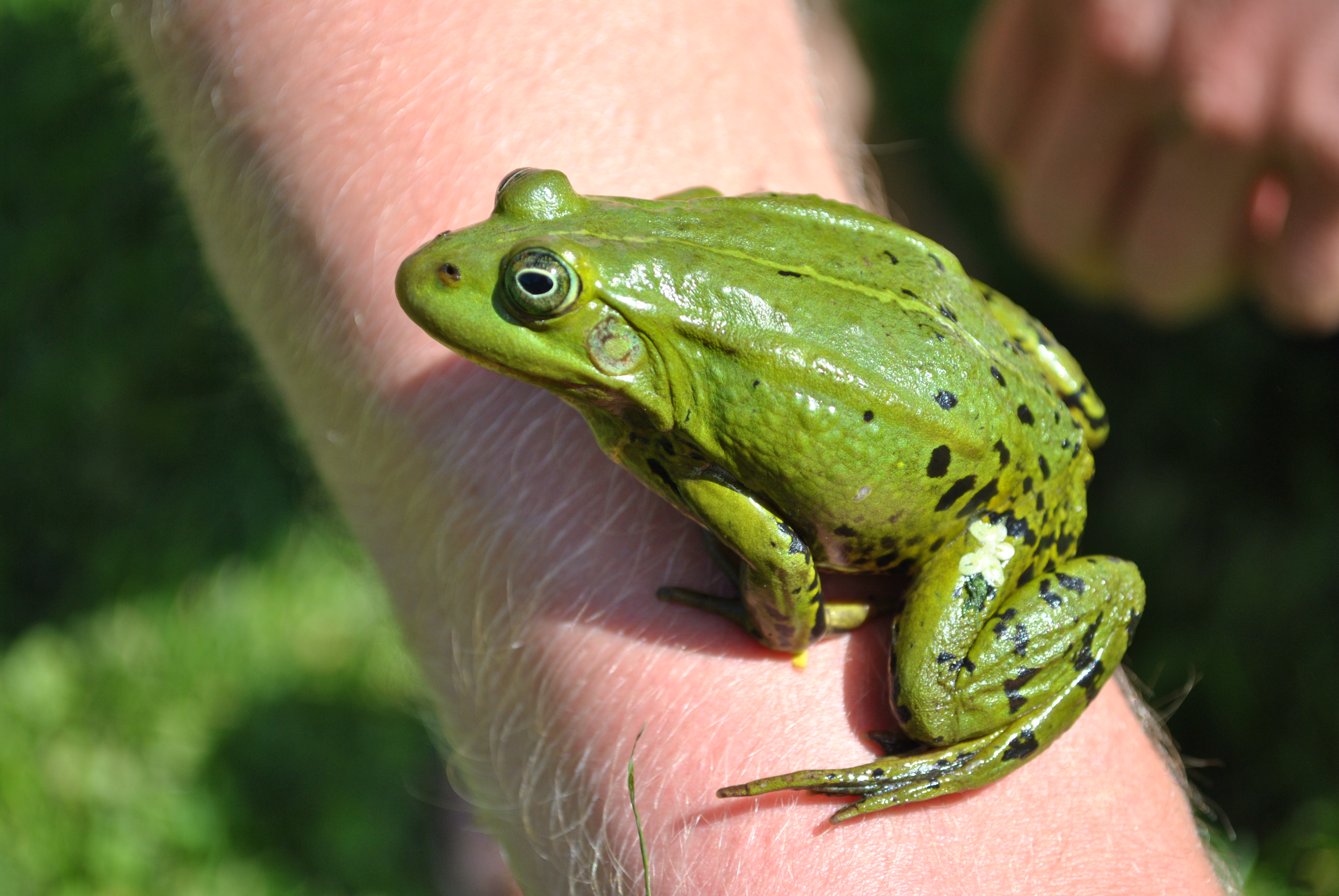
Edible frog on a human arm

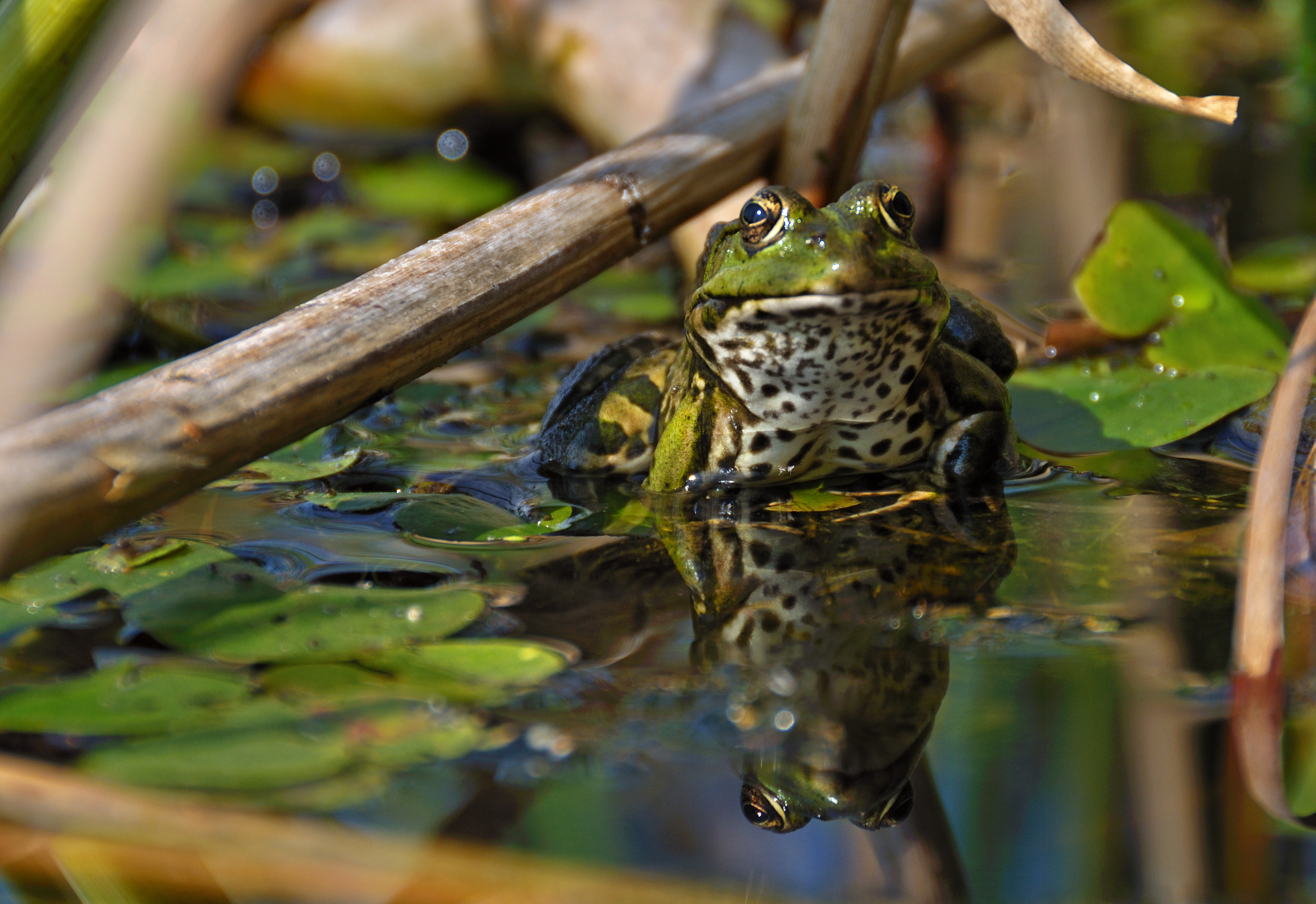
Edible frog in pond habitat

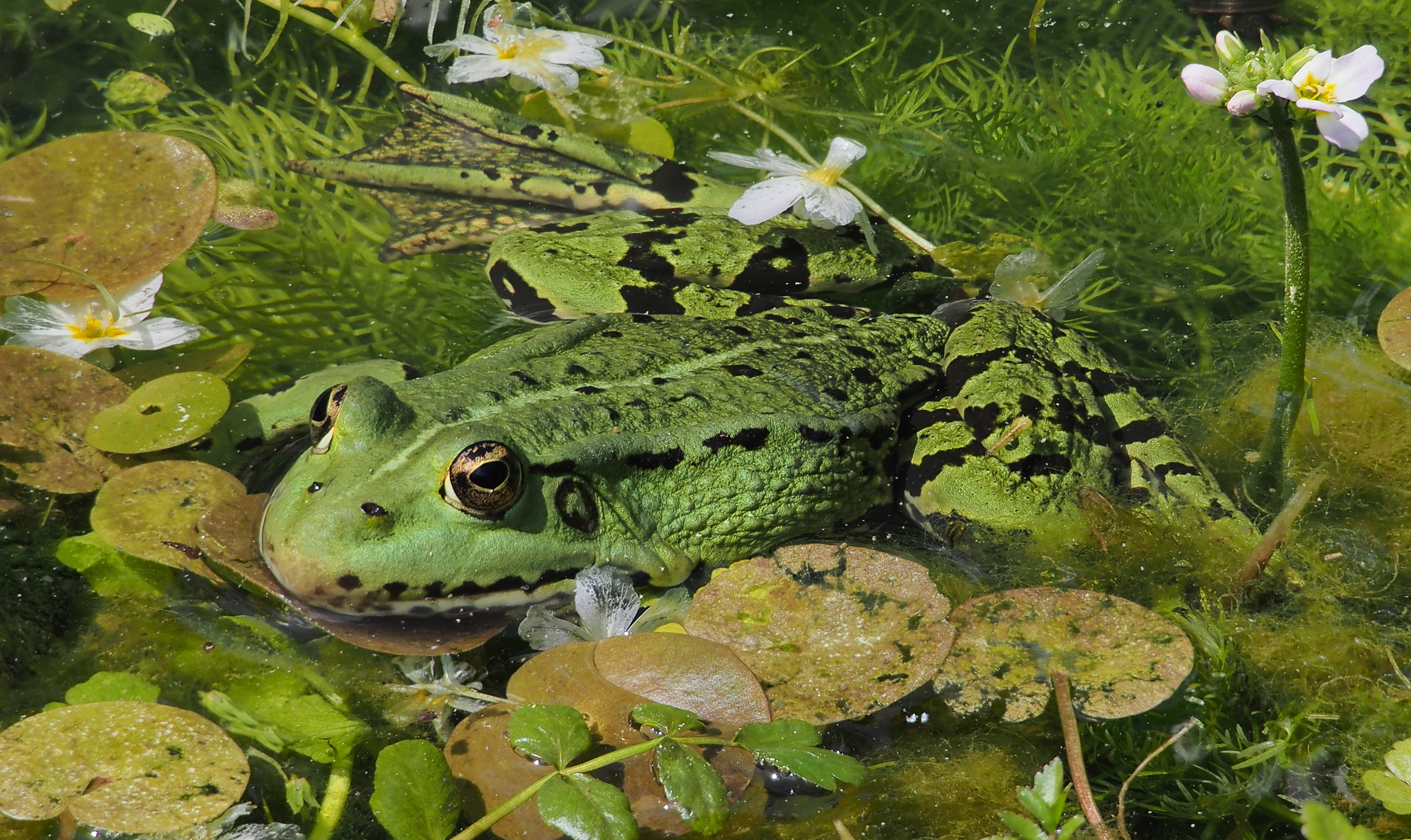
Edible frog in a swamp

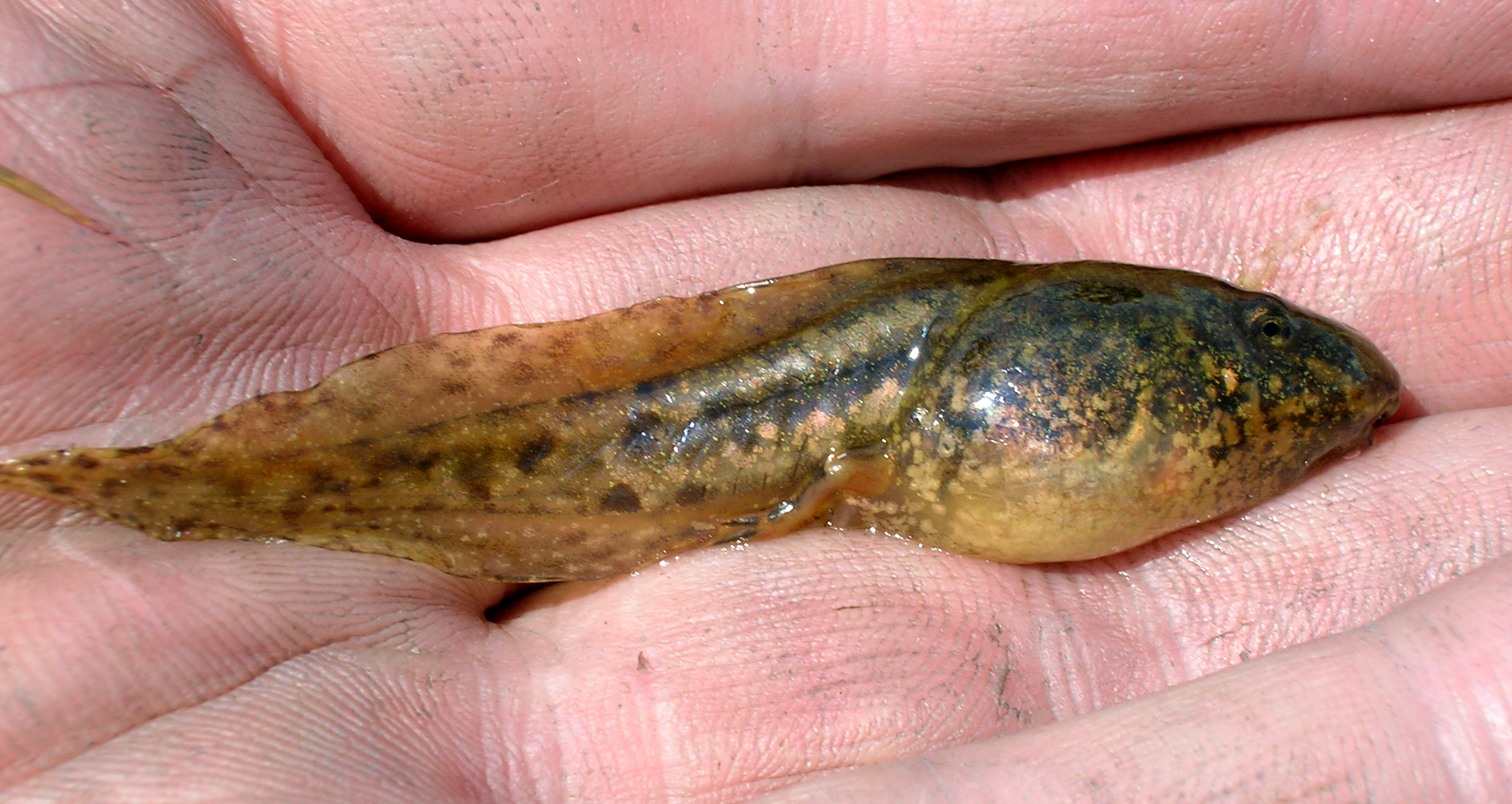
Tadpole
