= List of amphibians of Crete =

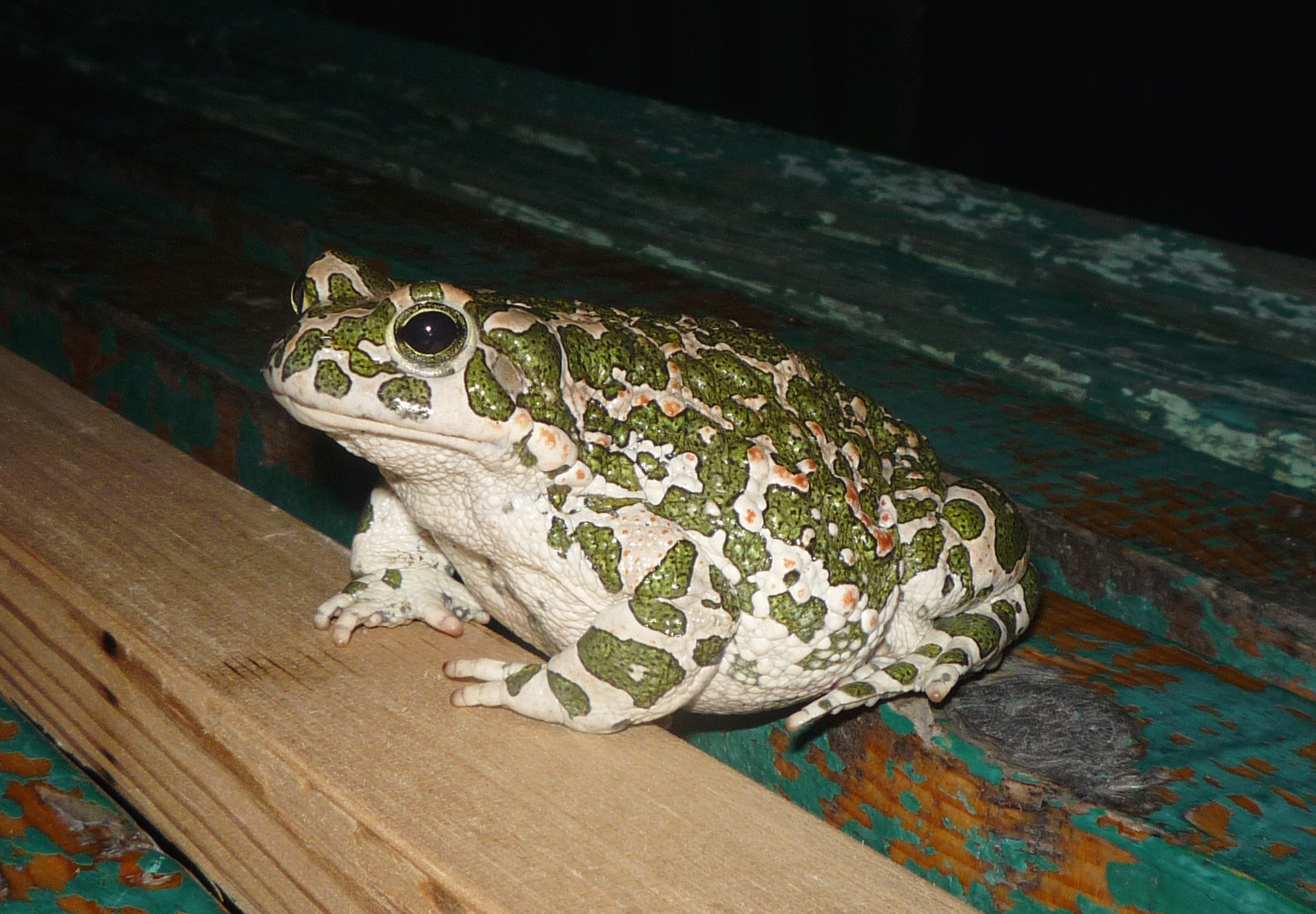
European green toad.

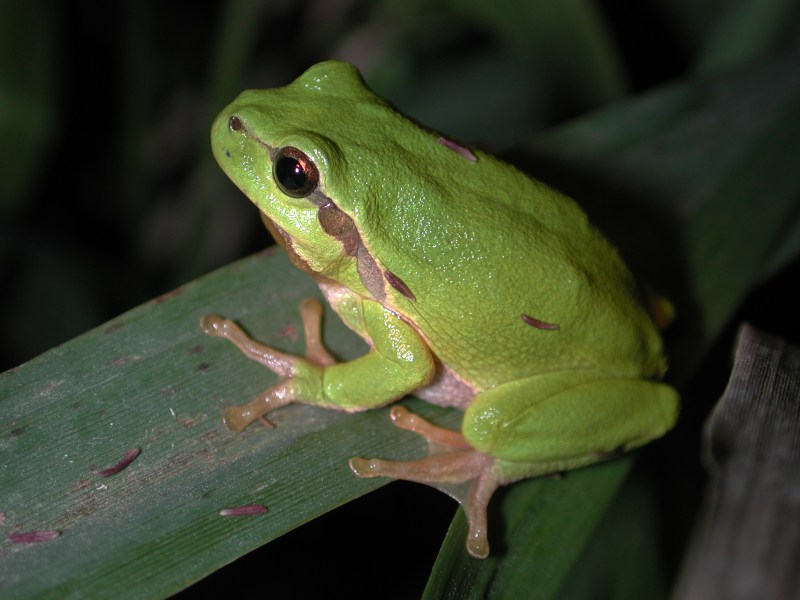
European tree frog.

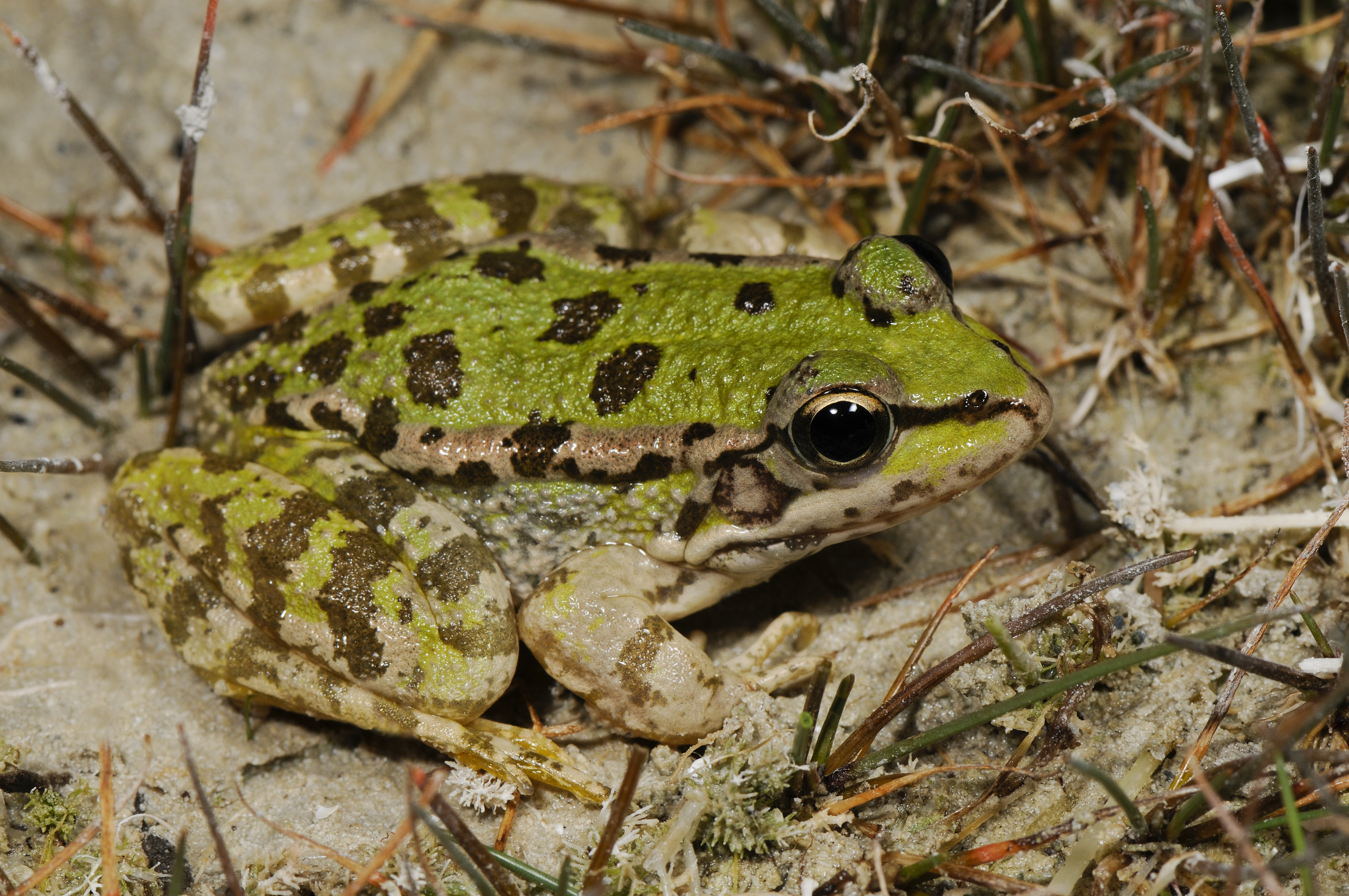
Cretan frog.

There are four species of amphibians present on the island of Crete, of which the Cretan frog is endemic to the island.

In the 1990s, the presence of the American bullfrog was recorded in the area around lake Agia. It is an invasive species whose eradication has been recommended by environmental authorities.

== Anura ==
=== Bufonidae ===
- European green toad (Bufotes viridis) LC

=== Hylidae ===
- European tree frog (Hyla arborea) LC

=== Ranidae ===
- Cretan frog (Pelophylax cretensis) EN
- American bullfrog (Lithobates catesbeianus) LC

== See also ==
- List of amphibians of Greece
