= List of amphibians of Greece =

This list of the amphibians of Greece is primarily based on the Atlas of the Amphibians and Reptiles of Greece (2020), published under the auspices of the Societas Hellenica Herpetologica, supplemented by the IUCN Red List. Of the 26 (IUCN) or 25 (Atlas) species recognized, three are endemic (Karpathos frog, Cretan frog, Karpathos salamander), while three are assessed as endangered (Karpathos frog, Cretan frog, Lycian salamander).

Two species for which there is an IUCN Red List assessment are not included in the Atlas (Balkan spadefoot, Pelobates balcanicus LC^{IUCN}; smooth newt, Lissotriton vulgaris LC^{IUCN}). The IUCN Red List appears to no longer count Greece as one of the countries within the Syrian spadefoot's range, even though the species occurs on a number of Greek islands.

== Order: Anura (frogs) ==
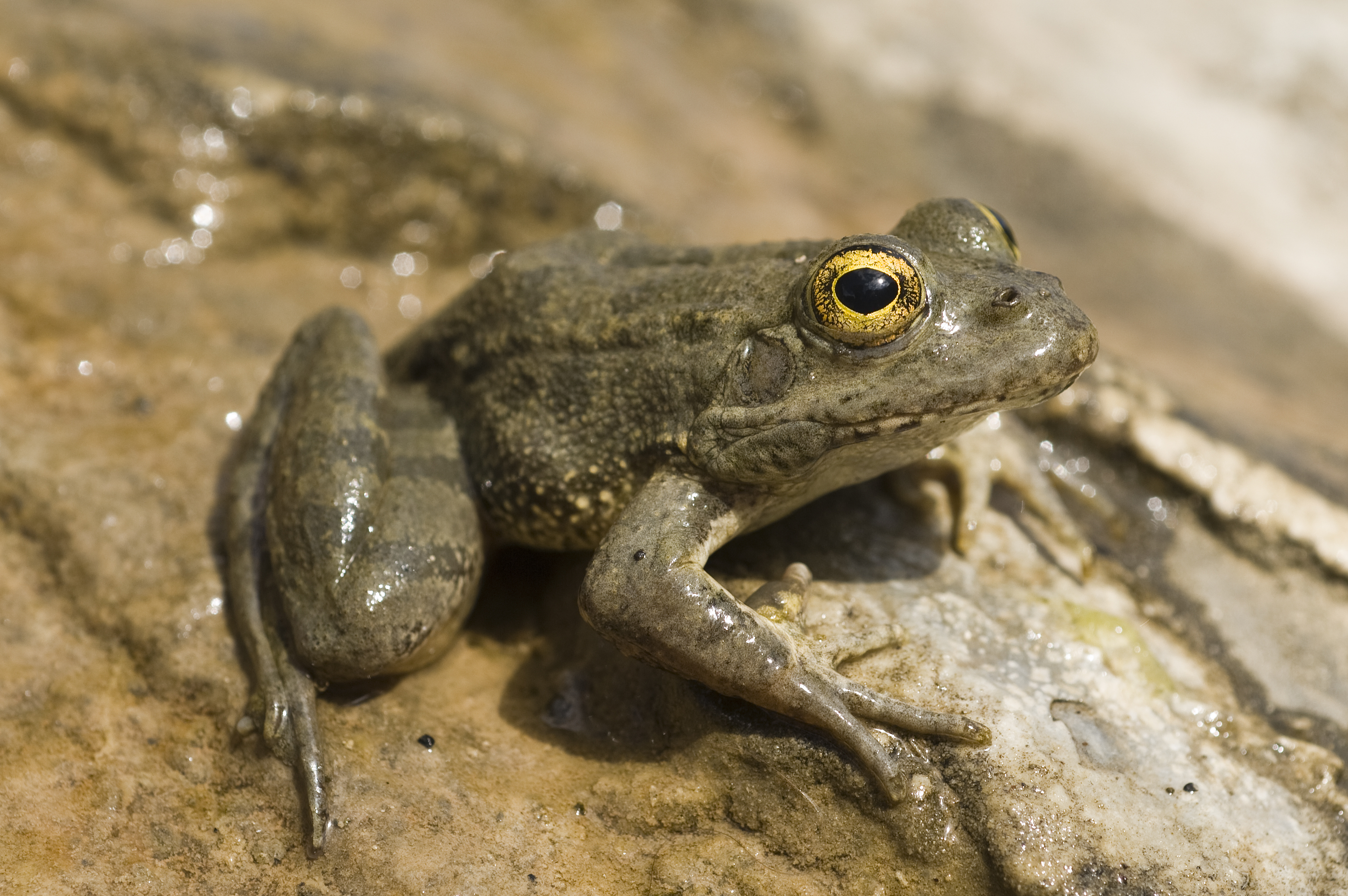
Karpathos frog, Pelophylax cerigensis

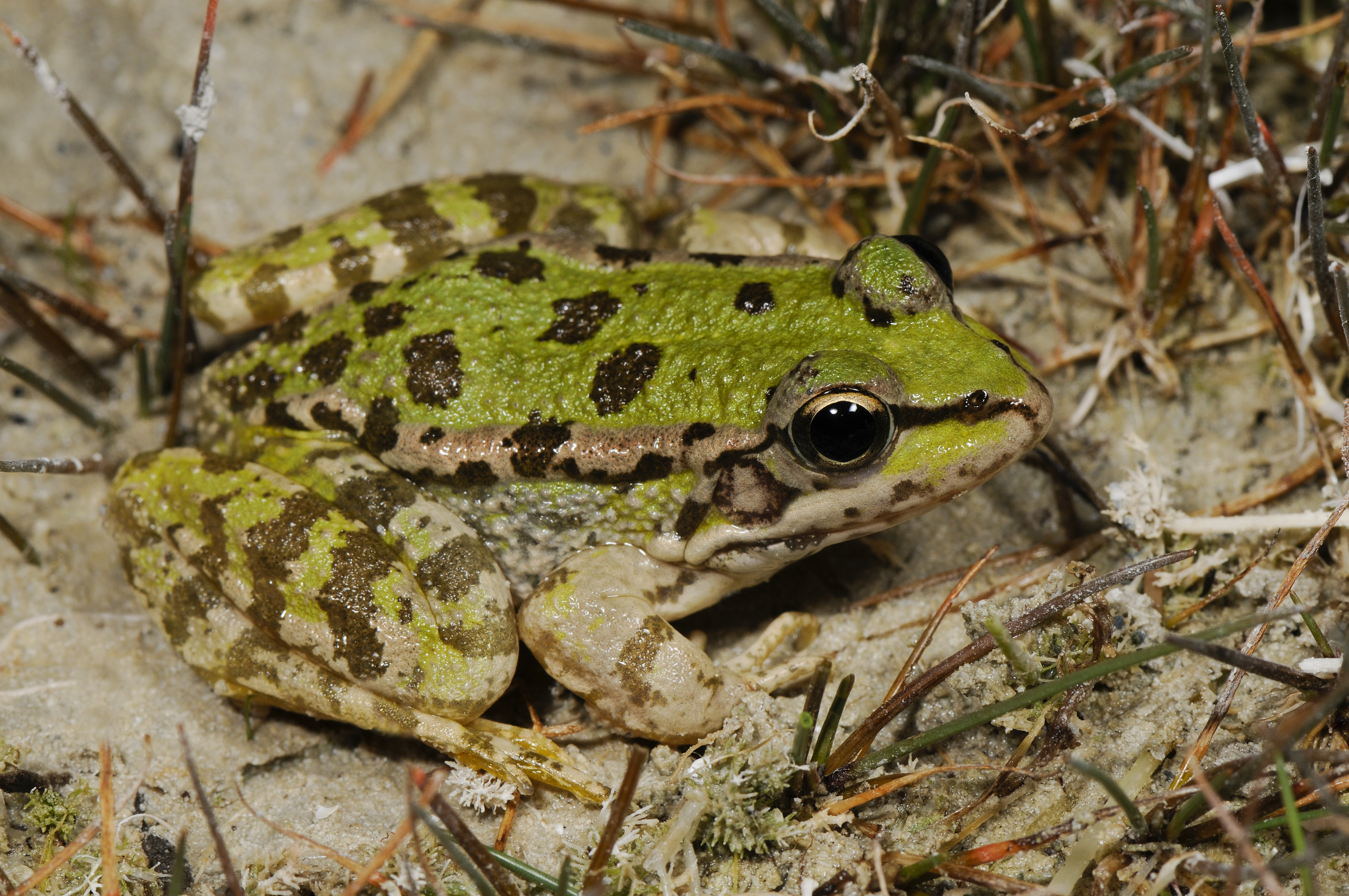
Cretan frog, Pelophylax cretensis

- Family: Bombinatoridae
  - Genus: Bombina
    - European fire-bellied toad, Bombina bombina LC^{IUCN}
    - Yellow-bellied toad, Bombina variegata LC^{IUCN}
- Family: Bufonidae
  - Genus: Bufo
    - Common toad, Bufo bufo LC^{IUCN}
  - Genus: Bufotes
    - European green toad, Bufotes viridis LC^{IUCN}
- Family: Hylidae
  - Genus: Hyla
    - European tree frog, Hyla arborea LC^{IUCN}
    - Eastern tree frog, Hyla orientalis LC^{IUCN}
- Family: Pelobatidae
  - Genus: Pelobates
    - Syrian spadefoot, Pelobates syriacus LC^{IUCN}
- Family: Ranidae
  - Genus: Lithobates
    - American bullfrog, Lithobates catesbeianus LC^{IUCN} (introduced)
  - Genus: Pelophylax
    - Levant water frog, Pelophylax bedriagae LC^{IUCN}
    - Karpathos frog, Pelophylax cerigensis EN^{IUCN} (endemic)
    - Cretan frog, Pelophylax cretensis EN^{IUCN} (endemic)
    - Epirus water frog, Pelophylax epeiroticus NT^{IUCN}
    - Balkan water frog, Pelophylax kurtmuelleri LC^{IUCN}
    - Marsh frog, Pelophylax ridibundus LC^{IUCN}
  - Genus: Rana
    - Agile frog, Rana dalmatina LC^{IUCN}
    - Greek stream frog, Rana graeca LC^{IUCN}
    - Common frog, Rana temporaria LC^{IUCN}

== Order: Caudata (salamanders) ==
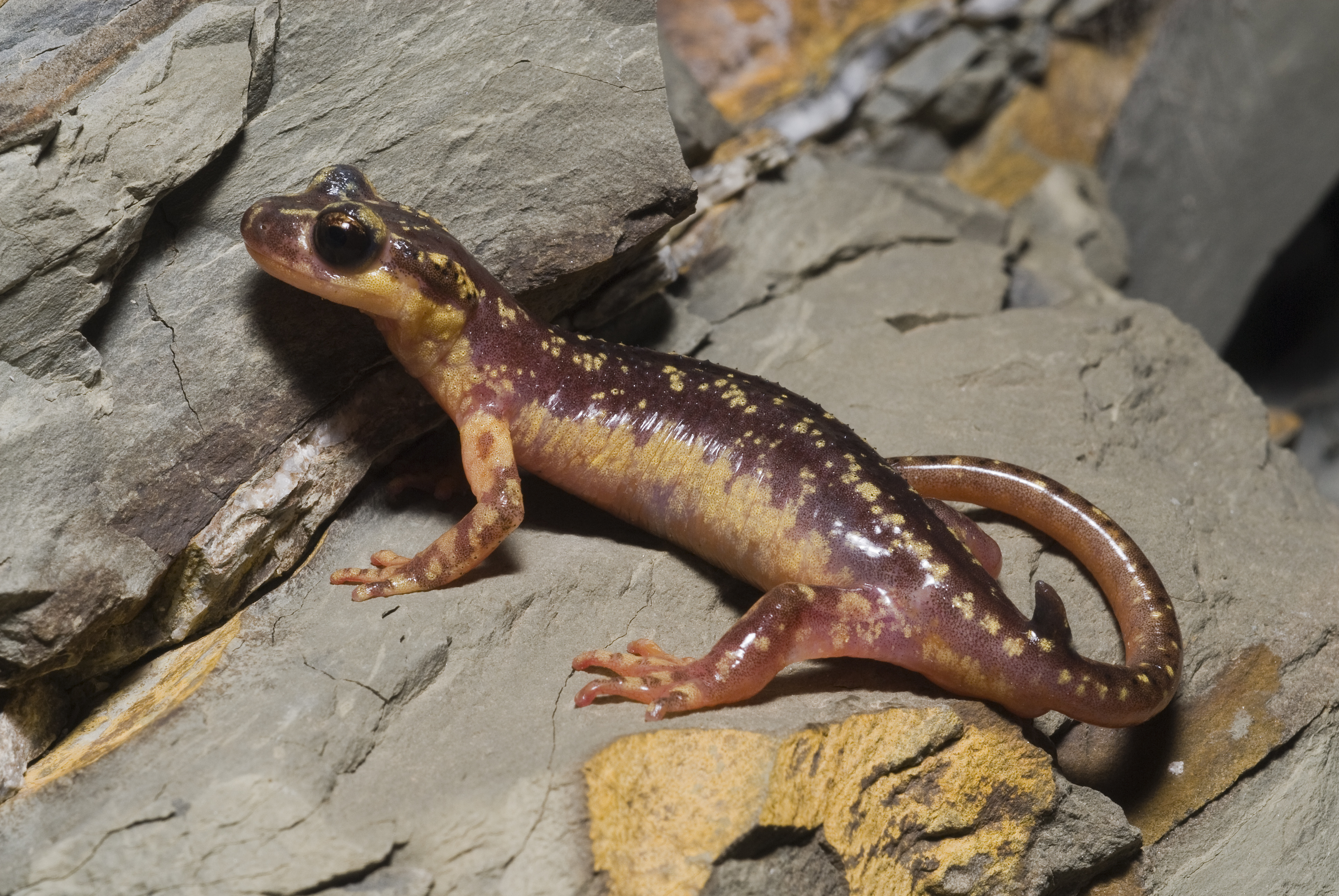
Karpathos salamander, Lyciasalamandra helverseni

- Family: Salamandridae
  - Genus: Ichthyosaura
    - Alpine newt, Ichthyosaura alpestris LC^{IUCN}
  - Genus: Lissotriton
    - Greek smooth newt, Lissotriton graecus LC^{IUCN}
    - Schmidtler's smooth newt, Lissotriton schmidtleri LC^{IUCN}
  - Genus: Lyciasalamandra
    - Karpathos salamander, Lyciasalamandra helverseni VU^{IUCN} (endemic)
    - Lycian salamander, Lyciasalamandra luschani EN^{IUCN}
  - Genus: Salamandra
    - Common fire salamander, Salamandra salamandra LC^{IUCN}
  - Genus: Triturus
    - Balkan crested newt, Triturus ivanbureschi LC^{IUCN}
    - Macedonian crested newt, Triturus macedonicus VU^{IUCN}

== See also ==
- List of mammals of Greece
- List of birds of Greece
- List of freshwater fishes of Greece
- List of reptiles of Greece
- List of amphibians of Crete
