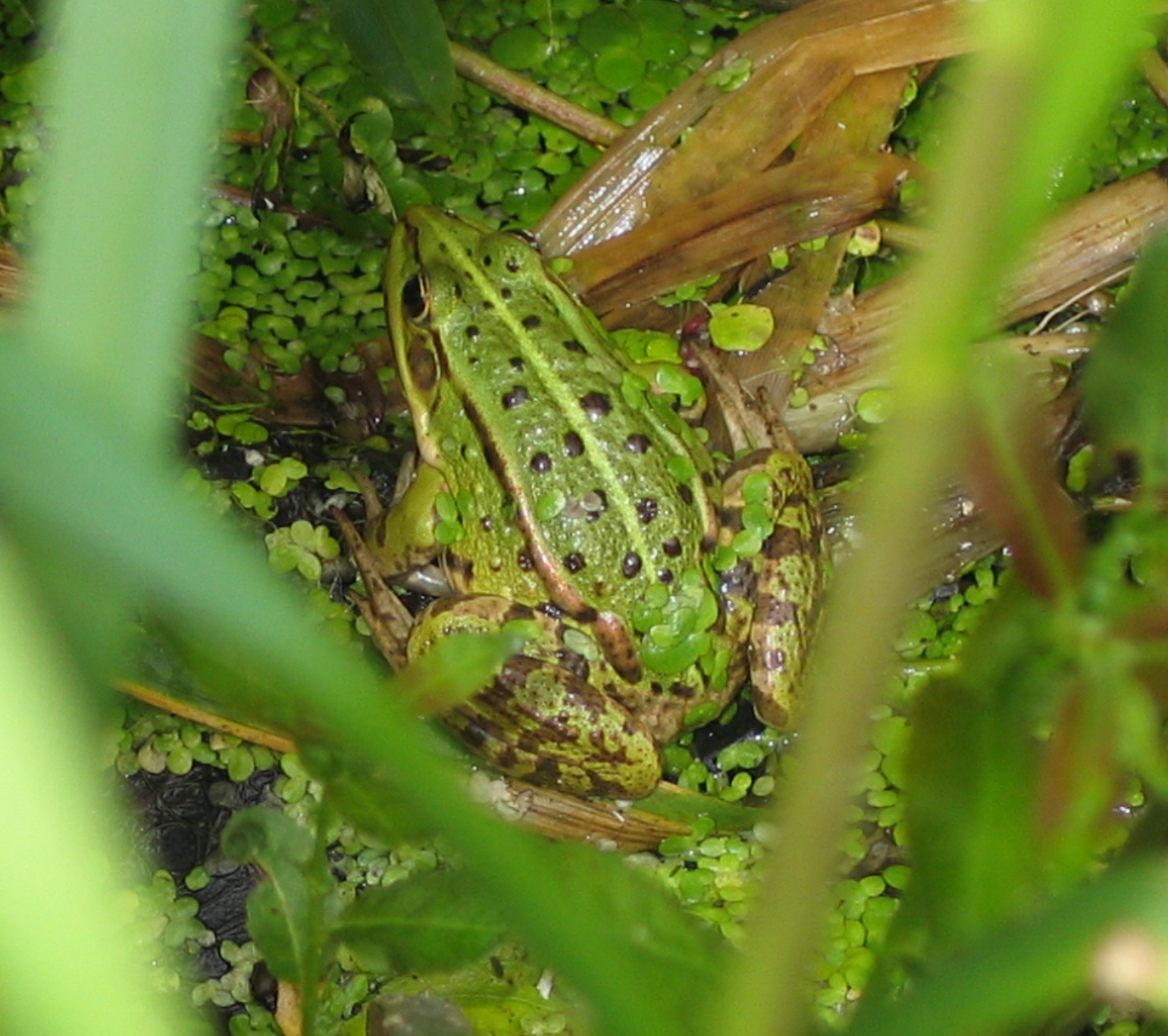
- Adult found in a pond in Poland

Conservation status
- Least Concern (IUCN 3.1)

Scientific classification
- Kingdom: Animalia
- Phylum: Chordata
- Class: Amphibia
- Order: Anura
- Family: Ranidae
- Genus: Pelophylax
- Species: P. lessonae

Binomial name
- Pelophylax lessonae (Camerano, 1882)

Subspecies
- See text
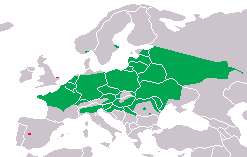
- Range of the nominate subspecies of the pool frog

Synonyms
- List: Rana lessonae Camerano, 1882; Rana esculenta Linnaeus, 1758 (Note: Apparently describing a specimen representing a Pelophylax lessonae × Pelophylax ridibundus hybridogen, not a true taxonomic synonym); Rana lessonae subsp. pannonica Karaman, 1948; Hylarana lessonae (Camerano, 1882); Rana esculenta subsp. lessonae Camerano, 1882; Rana esculenta subsp. bolkayi Fejérváry, 1909; Rana esculenta subsp. hungarica Toutain, 1966; Rana lessonae subsp. lessonae Camerano, 1882

Audio

= Pool frog =

Pool frog Temporal range: Late Pliocene - recent, 3.6–0 Ma

Species of amphibian

The pool frog (Pelophylax lessonae) is a species of frog in the family Ranidae. It is found in and around shallow, stagnant bodies of water across much of Europe, from France in the west to Russia in the east. Active in such areas from March to October, it disperses from the water to hibernate in woodland soil during the winter, and can tolerate being frozen overnight while hibernating. A close relative of the marsh frog, the two species can interbreed to produce a hybrid called the edible frog, which maintains its own population by breeding with one of its parental species. The pool frog is very similar in appearance to these related species, but can be distinguished based on vocal sac color, snout shape, leg length, the shape of a hardened lump on the foot, and skeletal features.

Active during both day and night, the adult pool frog is a predator that feeds mainly on invertebrates as an adult, but begins its life as a tadpole with a herbivorous diet. The breeding season is in early summer, when males use vocalisations to ward one another off and attract females. The frogs are sensitive to changes in temperature, which determines their reproductive behaviour and calls. Mating and egg-laying occur in water, where the tadpoles develop until they metamorphose and emerge onto land in late summer. At all life stages, pool frogs are hunted by a wide range of predators such as fish, birds, snakes and otters, and are parasitized by trematode and nematode worms. Tadpole development can vary based on temperature, pH, chemical exposure and the types of predators present.

Genetic evidence suggests that at least two subspecies of pool frog exist, namely the European pool frog (P. l. lessonae) and the Italian pool frog (P. l. bergeri), though the latter has historically been considered a separate species. A third, unnamed subspecies may occur in Sicily and Calabria, but some authors consider these frogs to be a population of P. l. bergeri. Furthermore, P. l. lessonae can be split into two genetically distinct lineages that form a northern and southern clade respectively. While pool frogs as a whole are not considered to be endangered globally, populations in some countries have declined very severely. Northern clade populations are now considered critically endangered in Norway and were once wiped out from the UK, though they have since been reintroduced to the latter country.

== Taxonomy and evolution ==
=== History of naming ===
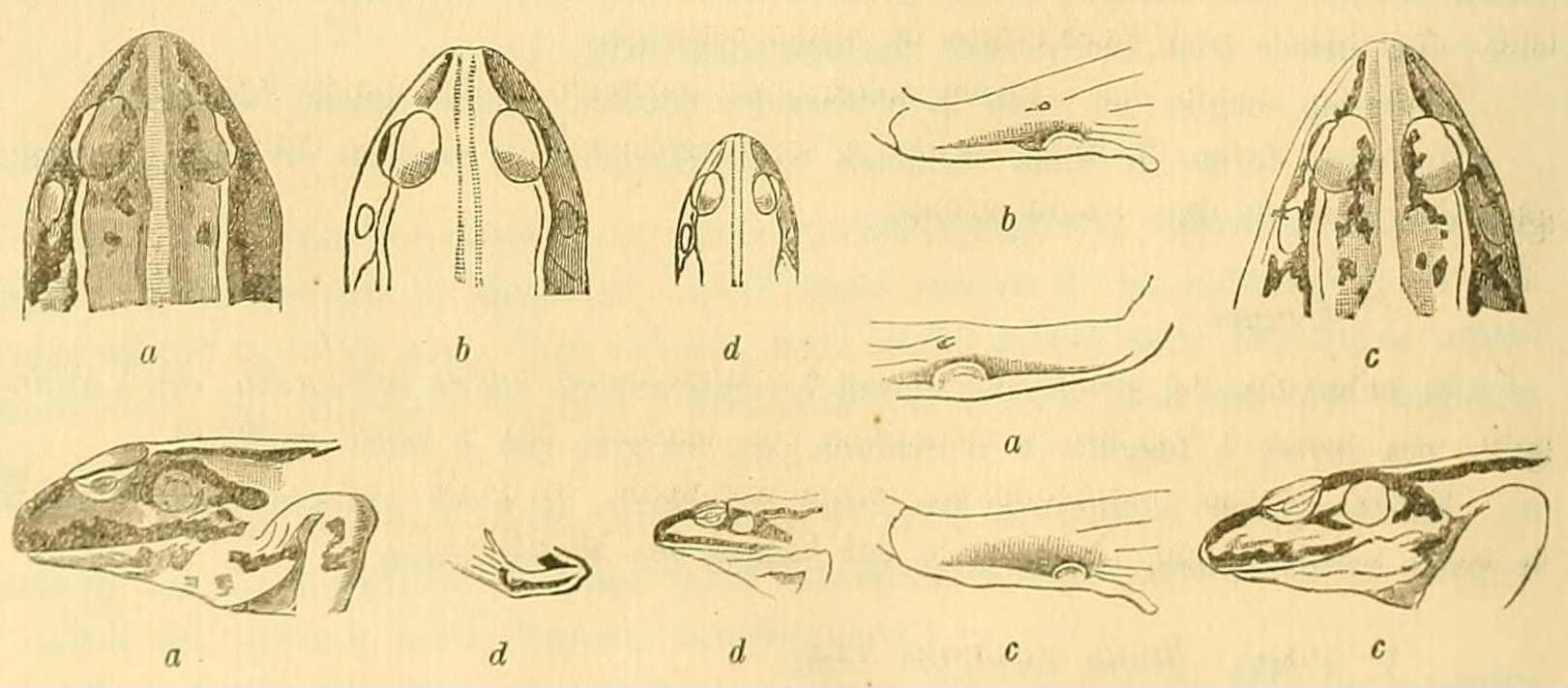
Illustrations made in 1884 by Lorenzo Camerano of the pool frog specimens that he studied

The pool frog was first recognised to be different from other frogs by Italian herpetologist Lorenzo Camerano, who published a scientific description of it in 1882. However, Camerano believed that it was a variant of the edible frog (which had the scientific name Rana esculenta at the time) rather than a separate species, and gave it the scientific name Rana esculenta var. lessonae, naming it after Italian zoologist Michele Lessona. Two years later, Camerano would adopt the concept of subspecies, and in an 1884 publication he refers to the pool frog as a subspecies by the name Rana esculenta lessonae. Though Camerano studied several pool frog specimens, he did not designated any of them as a holotype. Therefore, one of these specimens (a female with the specimen number MZUT An 718 kept in the Turin Museum of Natural History) was designated as a lectotype in 1986.

The possibility of the pool frog representing a separate species from the edible frog was first recognised in 1966 by Polish biologist Leszek Berger, who proposed this based on ecological and biometric data, though he did not decisively conclude so as he believed doing so was premature. In 1992, French zoologist Alain Dubois divided the genus Rana into 33 subgenera, with the pool frog being placed in the subgenus Pelophylax under the name Rana (Pelophylax) lessonae. A study published in 2005 further divided the species placed in the genus Rana at the time into several different genera, with those of the subgenus Pelophylax being assigned to the genus Hylarana, thus the pool frog was considered to be part of this genus under the name Hylarana lessonae. In 2006, another publication on amphibian taxonomy elevated the rank of Pelophylax from subgenus to genus, a revision which is further supported by a study published the following year, so the scientific name of the pool frog was recombined once again into Pelophylax lessonae.

In addition, some pool frog specimens were formerly thought to represent distinct, separate forms. Hungarian general Géza Fejérváry established the name Rana esculenta var. bolkayi in 1909 for a type of frog found along the Rhône river, but does not designate a holotype specimen. Similarly, Yugoslav biologist Stanko Karaman erected a new subspecies of pool frog given the name Rana lessonae pannonica in 1948 without specifying a type specimen. Both the bolkayi and pannonica names were declared as junior synonyms of Rana lessonae in 1994.

=== Subspecies ===
The pool frog has historically been considered a monotypic species with no subspecies. However, some authors believe that the Italian pool frog (historically deemed a separate species by the name of Pelophylax bergeri) represents a subspecies within the same species as "typical" Pelophylax lessonae individuals. This was first proposed in 2004 based on a study involving electrophoretic data (the movement of molecules in an electric field), which shows that the two types of frog exhibit very little divergence. A phylogenetic study published in 2008 further supported this. Under this classification, the pool frog includes the following two named subspecies:

Subspecies	Trinomial authority	Description	Range
European pool frog (P. l. lessonae) (Nominate subspecies)	(Camerano, 1882)	Identical in appearance, only distinguishable by genetic analysis and location	Northern Italy and elsewhere in Europe
Italian pool frog (P. l. bergeri)	Günther, in Engelmann, Fritzsche, Günther & Obst, 1986	Identical in appearance, only distinguishable by genetic analysis and location	Most of peninsular Italy

DNA analysis indicates that P. l. lessonae can be further split into two genetically distinct sub-populations, namely a northern clade found in Sweden, Norway, England, Finland and Estonia, and a southern clade that is more widespread throughout the rest of Europe.

In addition, individuals from Sicily and Calabria have been suggested to represent a third subspecies which is currently unnamed and closely related to P. l. bergeri. A genetic study published in 2024 found that the Sicilian frogs are more closely related to one another than to frogs on the Italian mainland, but still considered them to be part of the bergeri subspecies.

=== Evolution ===
The pool frog is a member of Pelophylax, a genus which is widely distributed across Eurasia, and genetic analysis has revealed that it is more closely related to other European members of this genus than to any of the east Asian species. A study published in 2024 found that European pool frogs (P. l. lessonae) and Italian pool frogs (P. l. bergeri) are each other's closest known relatives, supporting the idea that they are subspecies of the same species, and suggests that they split from each other about 2.7 million years ago during the Late Pliocene. The closest living relative of the pool frog species as a whole is the Albanian water frog (P. shqipericus), and the last common ancestor of these two species is estimated to have lived about 5.2 million years ago during the Early Pliocene. This roughly coincides with the end of the Messinian salinity crisis, an event which may have triggered the divergence of these lineages. The following cladogram shows the position of the pool frog among its closest living relatives according to Dufresnes and colleagues (2024):

- Pelophylax Western Palearctic
  - - - - P. ridibundus marsh frogs
          ⊞Show taxa
          ⊟
          - - P. r. bedriagae
            - - P. r. kurtmuelleri
              - P. r. ridibundus
          - - cf. ridibundus lineages
              - - - P. r. persicus
                  - P. r. terentievi
                - - P. r. caralitanus
                  - - cf. ridibundus
                    - P. r. cerigensis
              - cf. ridibundus
            - P. r. cypriensis
        - P. cretensis
      - P. epeiroticus
    - pool frogs
      - P. lessonae
        - P. l. lessonae
        - P. l. bergeri
      - P. shqipericus
  - - P. perezi
    - P. saharicus

Fossil remains show that frogs of the genus Pelophylax were already widespread across Europe during the Early Oligocene, with remains dating back to this period known France, Germany and Romania, suggesting that the ancestors of the pool frog arrived to the continent over 33.9 million years ago. The oldest fossils assigned to the modern pool frog species itself originate from Korotoyak, Voronezh Oblast in Russia and date back to the Late Pliocene, indicating that the species already existed between 3.6 and 2.58 million years ago.

== Description ==
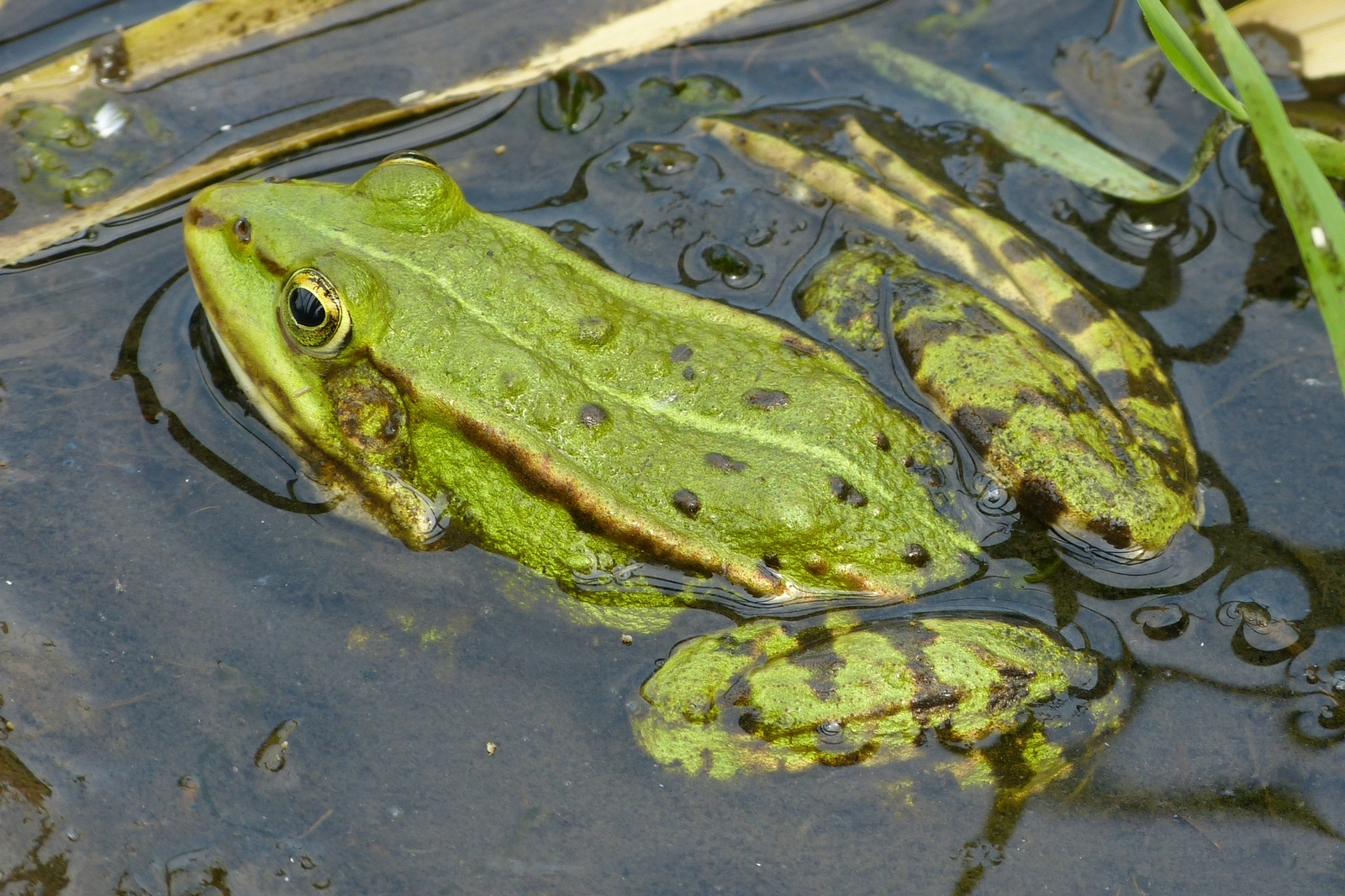
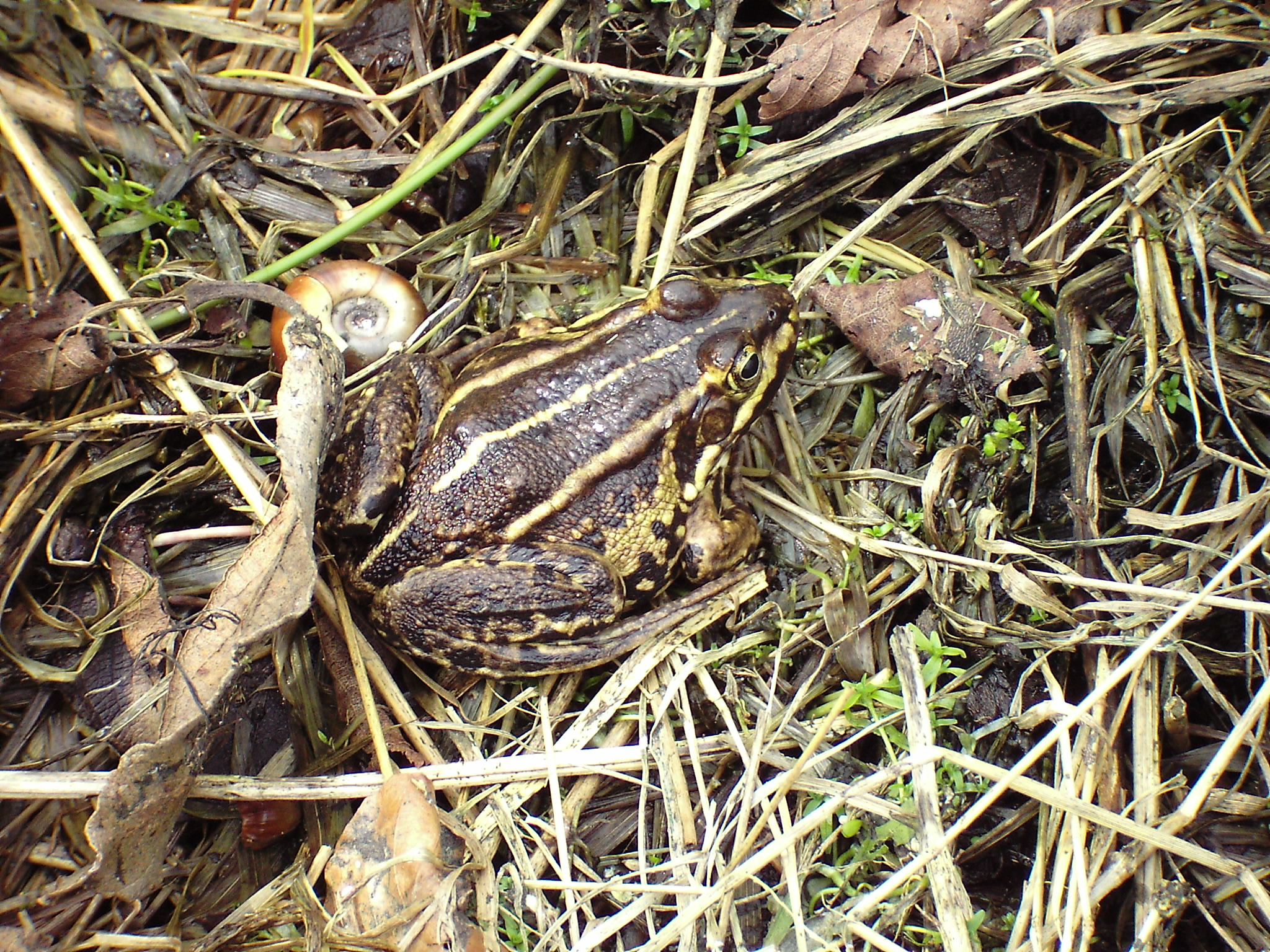
While most pool frogs are green (top), some individuals are mainly brown (bottom)

The pool frog is a medium-sized frog which typically grows 4–7 cm (1.6–2.8 in) long. Its skin is smooth and shiny, and forms distinctive folds on the sides of its back. The colouration of these frogs is highly variable, often a shade of light or dark green, though some females and juveniles are mostly brown. While most populations consist primarily of green individuals, those of the northern clade of P. l. lessonae are usually brown, and have a pale stripe running down the back. Dark blotches are often present on the back, legs and flanks, and a bright green stripe runs down the middle of the frog's back. The legs often have yellowish and dark barred patterning, and the head and upper body may become bright yellow, especially in males during the breeding season. The thigh is usually yellow, but in some individuals it is reddish or green instead. The animal's underside usually has no or few spots, though scant or even dense spots are known in some individuals. In some populations, a large proportion of individuals have spots on their undersides, but these spots usually do not appear until the frog is over a year old. The exact underside pattern of each individual is unique and can thus be used to identify them. Adult males have a pair of vocal sacs, one under each tympanum, which are often folded internally but inflate and become visible during vocalisation. These sacs are white, a feature distinguishing the pool frog from the edible frog (which has grey vocal sacs) and the marsh frog (which has dark grey to black vocal sacs).

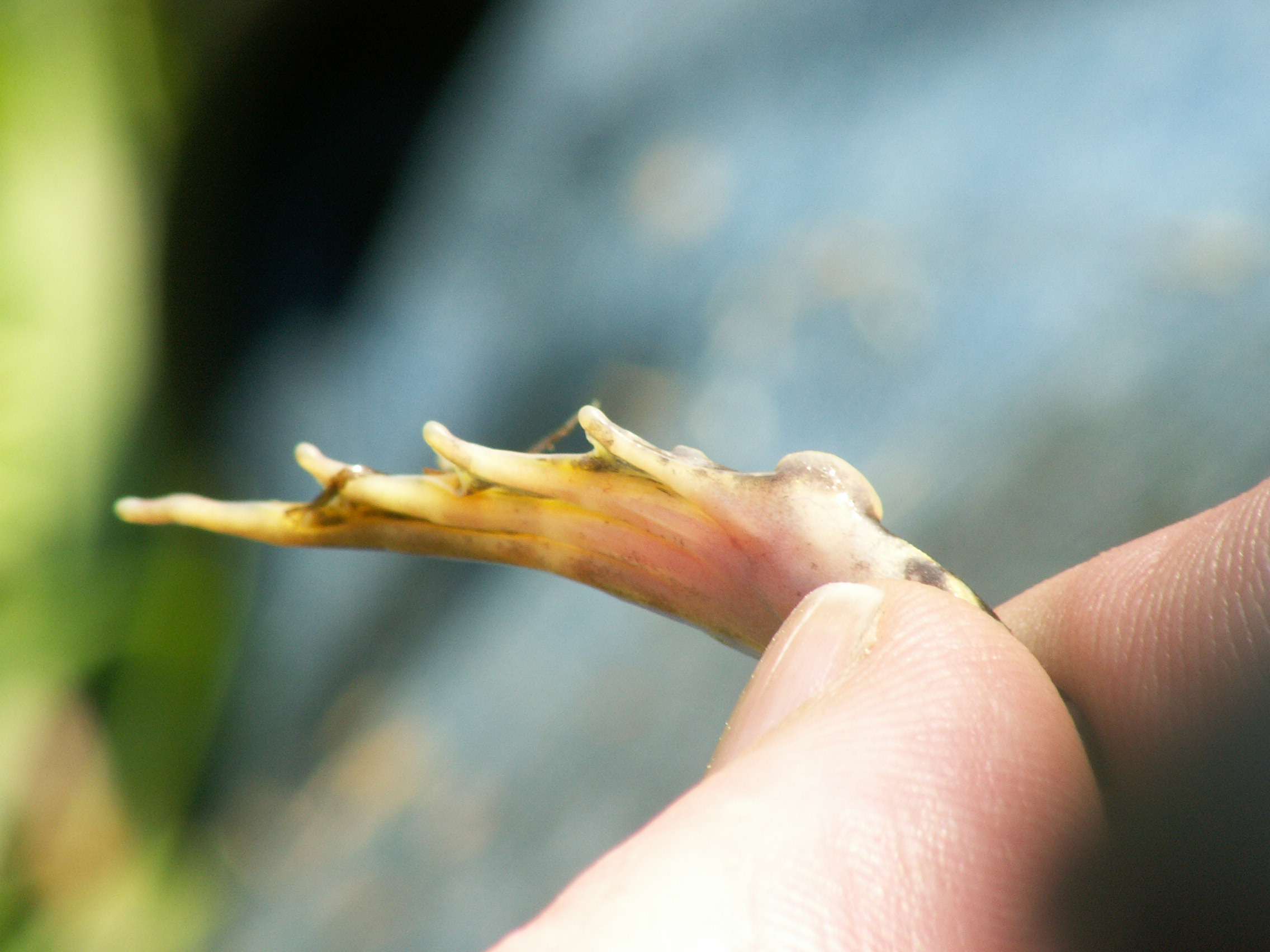
The shape of the metatarsal tubercle on the foot is an important feature for distinguishing pool frogs from related species

The snout of a pool frog is short and blunt, differing from the related edible and marsh frogs whose snouts are more elongated and form a sharper tip. The hind legs of a pool frog are also shorter than those of related species, with the heel joint reaching only up to the eyes when the leg is pulled forwards along the body; by comparison, most other European species of the same genus (such as the Perez's frog, Graf's hybrid frog, marsh frog and edible frog) have heels that reach or extend past the snout when the leg is pulled that way. Each foot bears a hardened lump called the metatarsal tubercle, which is large and forms a symmetrical, semi-circular shape. A study published in 2020 revealed that the size and shape of the metatarsal tubercle is the most important and reliable feature for distinguishing pool frogs from edible or marsh frogs; in the latter two species, this tubercle is much smaller and asymmetrical, with the highest point near the toe and its height decreasing towards the leg.

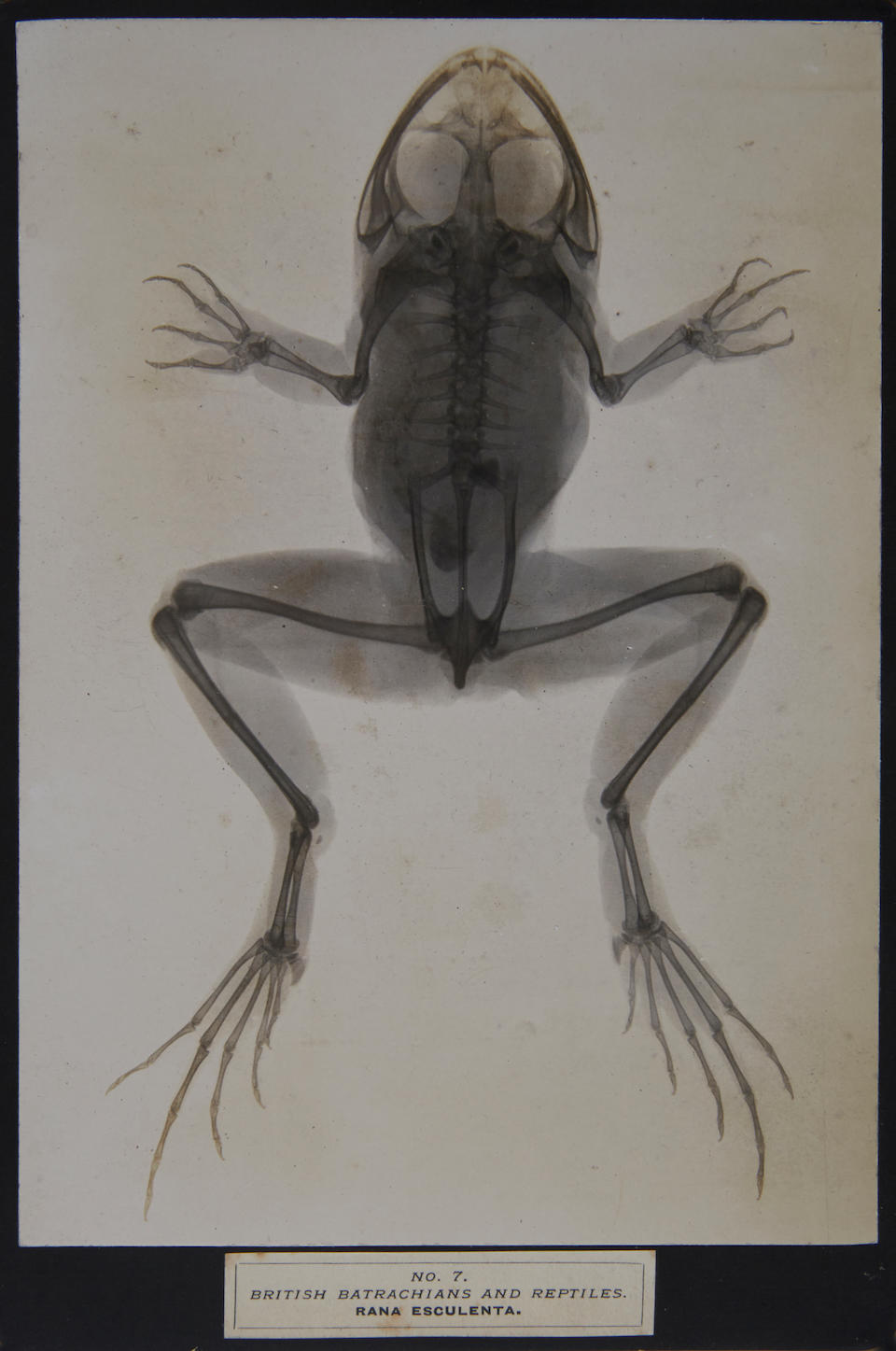
Skeleton of a pool frog photographed using an X-ray machine in 1897 (the species was referred to as Rana esculenta at the time, hence the label)

Certain bones can be used to distinguish the skeleton of a pool frog from those of other frogs, with the frontoparietals being the most diagnostic. These are bones of the skull formed by the fusion of the frontal and parietal bones, and those of European species in the Pelophylax genus have a series of ridges originating from a projection at the hind part of the bone (near where the skull connects to the vertebrae). The exact formation of these ridges is distinctly different between each species, with those of the pool frog being greatly reduced such that they form just a slight bulge in the hind part of the bone. Furthermore, the frontoparietals of the pool frog are very slender, with the length to width ratio increasing as the frog grows larger. In contrast, the marsh frog has robust frontoparietals with very pronounced ridges, and those of the edible frog are intermediate between those of marsh frogs and pool frogs. Additionally, the ilium (part of the hip bone) of a pool frog can also be used for identification because it has a tubercle on the front part that protrudes very far outward to the animal's side and beyond the acetabulum (hip socket). In the marsh frog and edible frog, this tubercle is instead flattened. However, because edible frogs show a wide range of gradual variation intermediate between pool and marsh frogs, identifying a single ilium to species level is impossible. Instead, a larger sample of over five ilia could be used to determine whether a population of frogs consists purely of pool or marsh frogs, or if edible frogs are also present. The ilia of all three species are notably thicker along the junction of the ilium and ischium (another part of the hip bone), a feature distinguishing them from those of frogs in the genus Rana.

The tadpole of the pool frog generally measures 4–8 cm (1.6–3.1 in) and has a pointed tail tip. It is brown or olive in colour, becoming greener as it gets older. A single respiratory opening called a spiracle is present on the left side of the body and is diagonally pointed upwards, while the cloaca is on the right side.

== Distribution and habitat ==
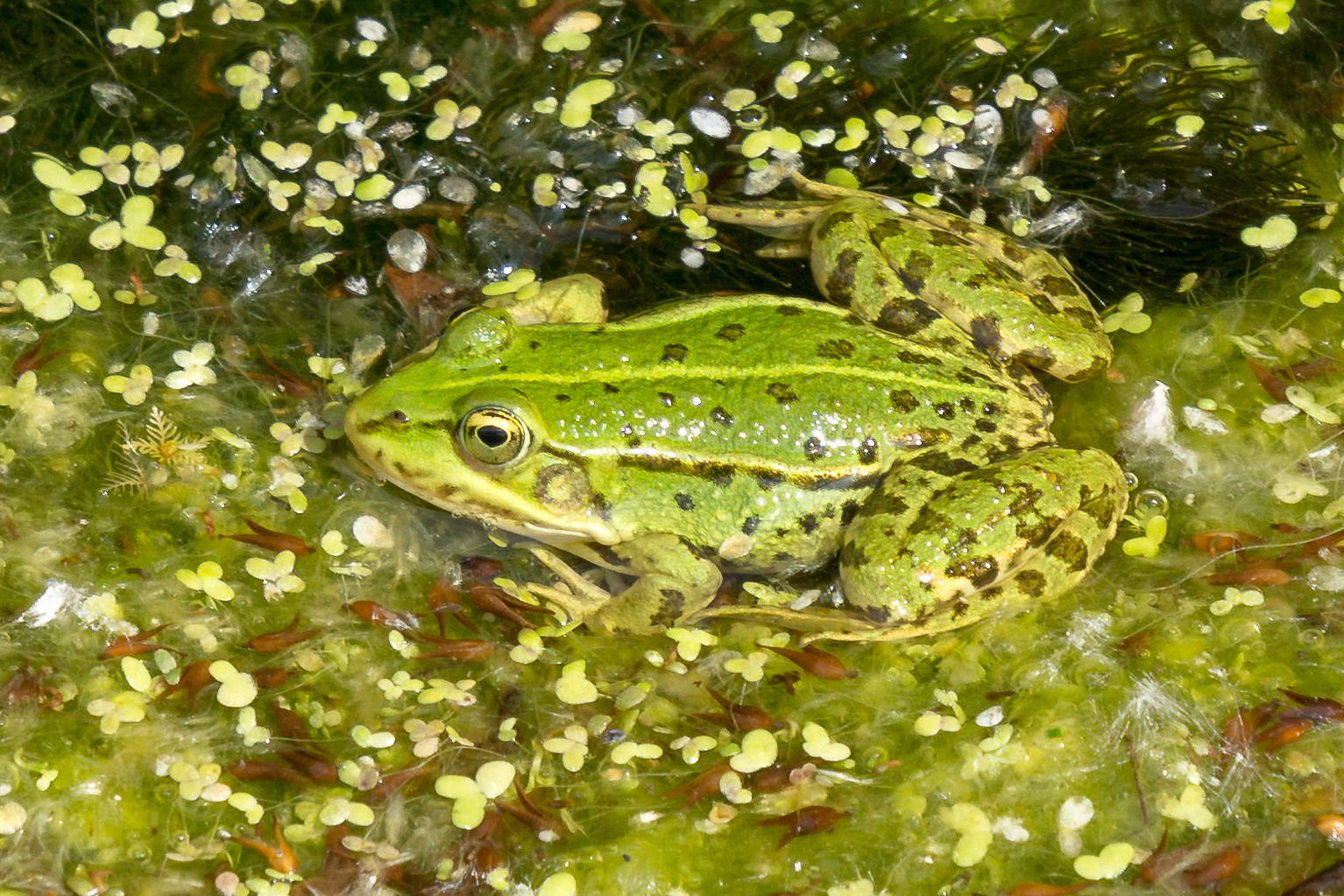
Inhabiting a pond in Germany

The pool frog is found across most of central Europe from the west coast of northern France to the Ural Mountains in western Russia. Though absent from most of Scandinavia, there are also small populations of pool frogs in Sweden and Norway, as well as in the East Anglia region of England. Pool frogs were previously thought to be a non-native species in England, partly because individuals are known to have been introduced from southern Europe (though not from Scandinavia). However, genetic evidence has shown that East Anglian pool frogs are closely related to Scandinavian frogs, not to frogs from further south. In addition, subfossil remains show that pool frogs were present in East Anglia before the oldest known introductions, and thus are likely native. Introduced populations of pool frogs are also present in parts of Spain such as the Province of Cáceres, Galicia, Catalonia and the Valencian Community.

The pool frog typically occurs in stagnant and shallow bodies of water such as ditches, ponds and lakes, often with dense vegetation. It can be found in such water bodies in a wide range of habitats including forests, steppe, heathland, meadows and fens. During winter, it sometimes hibernates further away from the water. It can tolerate some level of habitat modification and may occur in agricultural land. The range of habitats that this species is present in varies depending on location; it is mostly restricted to oligotrophic (low-nutrient) ponds and fens towards the north of its range, whereas further south it becomes more widespread and can occur from sea level up to an altitude of 1,500 m (4,900 ft).

== Behaviour and biology ==
=== Hibernation ===
This frog is active between March and October, while the winter months are spent hibernating on land. The exact time of year that pool frogs spend hibernating varies from year to year based on temperatures, with less time spent hibernating in warmer years. Compared to that of the related edible frog, the pool frog's hibernation lasts longer, with pool frogs often leaving water earlier in autumn and returning to ponds later in spring than edible frogs do. Pool frogs typically hibernate 3–7 cm (1.2–2.8 in) below the surface of woodland soil, usually under plant matter in areas warmer than surrounding soil. They do not hibernate continuously throughout the whole winter, and instead often move between multiple hibernation sites throughout the season. Such movements are most common during the first half of winter (when it is relatively warmer), but can happen even at temperatures under 1 °C (34 °F). During hibernation, pool frogs typically lose weight, with females usually losing more than males do, and warmer winters lead to increased weight loss.

To cope with the cold during hibernation, the pool frog has adaptations that make it resistant to freezing. When exposed to subzero temperatures, its blood glucose level increases significantly, preventing its cells from shrinking and suffering from osmotic shock. This increased glucose is likely synthesised mainly from the liver rather than the muscles, as indicated by the liver glycogen level dropping when this happens. Similarly, blood lactate, liver glucose and liver alanine all accumulate when the frog is in freezing temperatures. Thanks to these adaptations, the pool frog accumulates ice at a much lower rate than the related marsh frog and edible frog do, allowing it to survive freezing for longer durations than its relatives. Though pool frogs still die if frozen for extended periods, their cold tolerance is enough to survive overnight freezing between 8 and 12 hours, allowing the frog to move to a warmer hibernation site if the one in use becomes cooler.

=== Reproduction and development ===
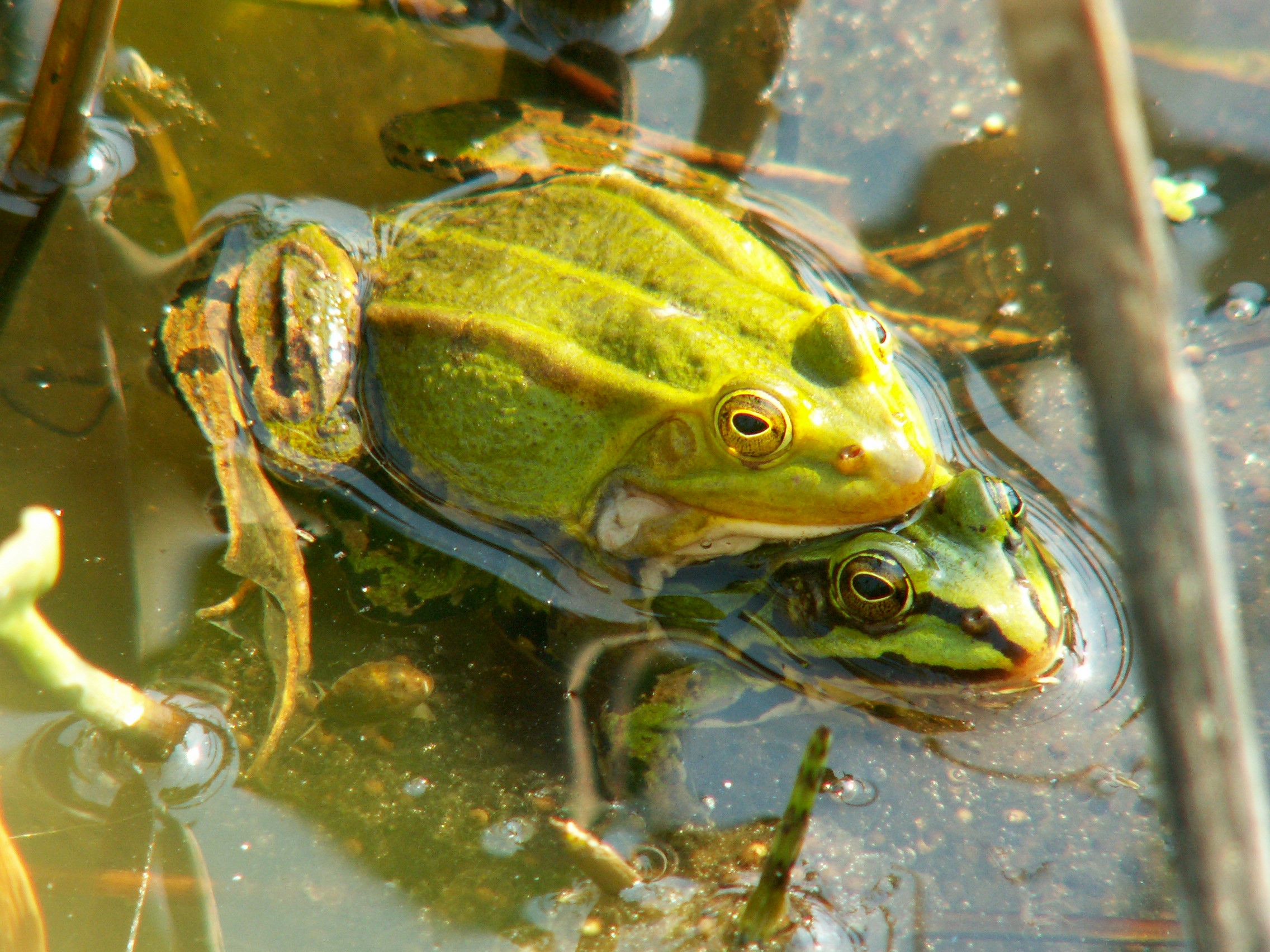
Mating pair in amplexus found in the Netherlands

Pool frogs reproduce during the summer, with the breeding season generally occurring from May to June. The exact timing varies based on a range of factors such as rainfall, sunlight, and temperature. The breeding season begins with a pre-spawning phase, during which the frogs arrive at bodies of water such as ponds, with the males establishing small territories at the edge of the water while the females occupy the sunnier parts in the center. The males produce territorial calls to ward one another off, and when the water temperature reaches 14–26 °C (57–79 °F), they also produce mating calls to attract females. This is followed by a spawning phase, during which the females move from the middle of the water into male territories at the edges, where mating occurs. Males use their forelimbs to grasp onto a female behind her front limbs, a behaviour known as amplexus, while the females lay packets of white, opalescent eggs which are fixed to underwater plants in sunny areas and float on the surface of the water. These eggs are produced in large numbers, with each female laying up to 4,500 of them. Each individual egg is small, measuring 6–8 mm (0.24–0.31 in) with the capsule. A water temperature of at least 16 °C (61 °F) is required for egg laying to occur. Ultimately, the breeding season concludes with a post-spawning phase in which most of the frogs leave the water, while a small number of males remain. These males are still territorial towards one another but stop producing mating calls.

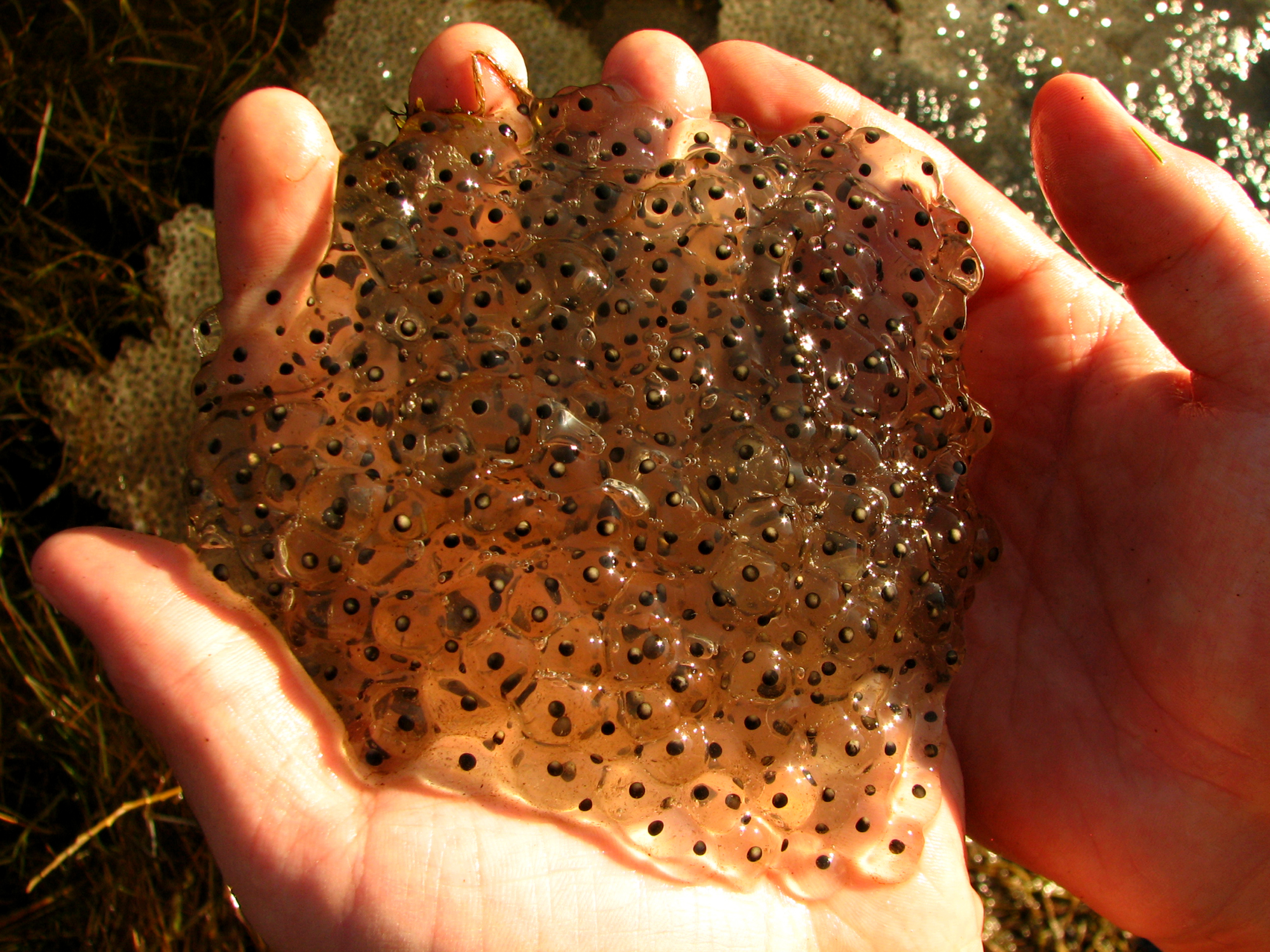
Pool frog eggs are laid in large numbers

Upon hatching from their eggs, the tadpoles initially move very little, but eventually become mobile and start feeding. The young tadpoles are herbivorous, feeding on algae and vegetation. Captive individuals have been recorded to readily eat boiled spinach, but not algae wafers or food pellets intended for fish or rabbits, though small amounts of goldfish flakes are eaten. Tadpoles with larger fathers tend to hatch at a larger size due to genetic reasons, yet inversely, those with larger mothers are usually smaller at hatching, and the interaction of paternal and maternal genes is important in determining size at hatching. If food is plentiful, tadpoles that were larger and more developed when hatching spend more time as tadpoles and reach larger sizes at metamorphosis than those that hatch smaller. In addition, they have slower growth rates in the first 30 days of their lives regardless of food abundance. Compared to those of the related marsh frog and edible frog, pool frog tadpoles have a lower metabolic rate and thus are more tolerant of low oxygen levels, though their oxygen consumption rates are still higher than those of many other tadpole species (such as those of the American bullfrog, Rio Grande leopard frog and northern leopard frog).

The physical development of tadpoles can vary depending on the risk of predation and type of predators present in the area; one experiment revealed that tadpoles develop shallower tails and deeper tail muscles when reared alongside pumpkinseed sunfish, allowing them to swim faster from the active predatory fish. In contrast, those reared with nymphs of southern hawker dragonflies developed taller tails with shallower muscles. This makes the tadpole slower but increases the size of the tail, which functions as an expendable part and diverts the attention of the ambush-hunting insect away from the vulnerable head. Tadpoles also vary in behaviour based on predators, with another experiment finding that activity and visibility are reduced when more tadpoles are killed by dragonfly nymphs. Even when the nymphs are caged and unable to hunt, their presence causes tadpoles to develop shorter, deeper tails, with the changes being more pronounced when the number of nymphs present is higher. While multiple studies have found tadpoles to develop similar physical changes in response to dragonfly nymphs, one published in 2006 revealed that tadpoles from different environments develop such traits because of different genes. Other factors also affect development rate, with one experiment revealing that tadpoles grow faster in a pH of 6.4 than one of 8.1, and that increasing levels of exposure to triphenyltin (a chemical often used as a pesticide) lead to lower growth rates. Temperature also has a strong effect on growth rate, with a study conducted in Switzerland finding that tadpoles in warmer ponds can begin metamorphosis eight weeks after their mothers laid their eggs, while those in cooler ponds required twelve weeks to do so. Typically, newly metamorphosed juveniles can be found on land by late summer.

==== Hybridogenesis ====
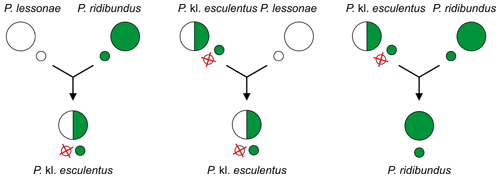
Example crosses between the pool frog (P. lessonae), the marsh frog (P. ridibundus) and their hybrid, the edible frog (P. kl. esculentus). The first is the primary hybridisation generating the hybrid; the second is the most widespread type of hybridogenesis.

Pool frogs are capable of reproducing with related species of frogs to produce hybrid offspring. For example, the edible frog (Pelophylax kl. esculentus) is a fertile hybrid of the European pool frog (P. lessonae lessonae) and the marsh frog (P. ridibundus). However, most edible frogs produce gametes (eggs or sperm) which exclude the genetic material of one parental species (usually the pool frog) and include only that of the other parental species (usually the marsh frog). Therefore, edible frog populations are maintained by backcrossing (the hybrids mating with the parental species whose genes are excluded), a mode of reproduction known as hybridogenesis. Similarly, the Italian pool frog (P. lessonae bergeri) is one of the parental species of a fertile hybrid called the Italian edible frog (P. kl. hispanicus), which maintains its populations by backcrossing with Italian pool frogs. Genetic analysis has revealed that the other parental species of the Italian edible frog is an otherwise unknown frog species whose "pure" form is currently extinct and was related to the marsh frog.

In addition, pool frogs can also produce hybrids with the Balkan frog (P. kurtmuelleri) or with the Albanian water frog (P. shqipericus). Such hybrids were originally discovered through mating experiments and not known to occur in the wild until they were found in a fish pond in Crna Mlaka, Croatia in 2011. Unlike edible frogs, these hybrids are likely not hybridogenetic.

=== Vocalisations ===
Adult male calling in the Netherlands

Male pool frogs have vocal sacs that inflate when they are vocalising, which they do during both day and night. The calls have been described as squeaking guttural croaks, with each note typically lasting about 1.5 seconds. The frogs are known to produce four main types of calls, namely a mating call, two types of territorial call and a release call. The mating call is used to attract females and produced in series, typically with four to seven calls in each series, though it may range from three to eleven calls. Each mating call consists of a sequence of pulse groups, with larger males producing lower-pitched calls that have a lower number of pulses per group. One type of territorial call is produced in either a "call and answer" form between two distant males or by a resident male when a rival male enters his territory, and a second type is generally emitted singly (or rarely in a series of two or three calls) following the aforementioned first type. The release call is emitted by a male when he is grasped by another male and is similar to the second type of territorial call, but shorter in duration and with a higher pulse repetition rate. In addition, there are two types of "transitional" calls that each combine feature of two different calls, namely one that combines the first territorial call with the mating call and one that combines the two territorial calls.

Pool frog calls change depending on the water temperature, with warmer waters leading to calls with shorter durations and inter-call intervals but higher frequencies. There are also call variations between populations in different areas, forming regional "accents". Such accents are primarily due to genetic differences rather than the result of learning, and thus can be used to trace the evolutionary history and ancestry of different populations.

== Ecology ==
=== Diet ===
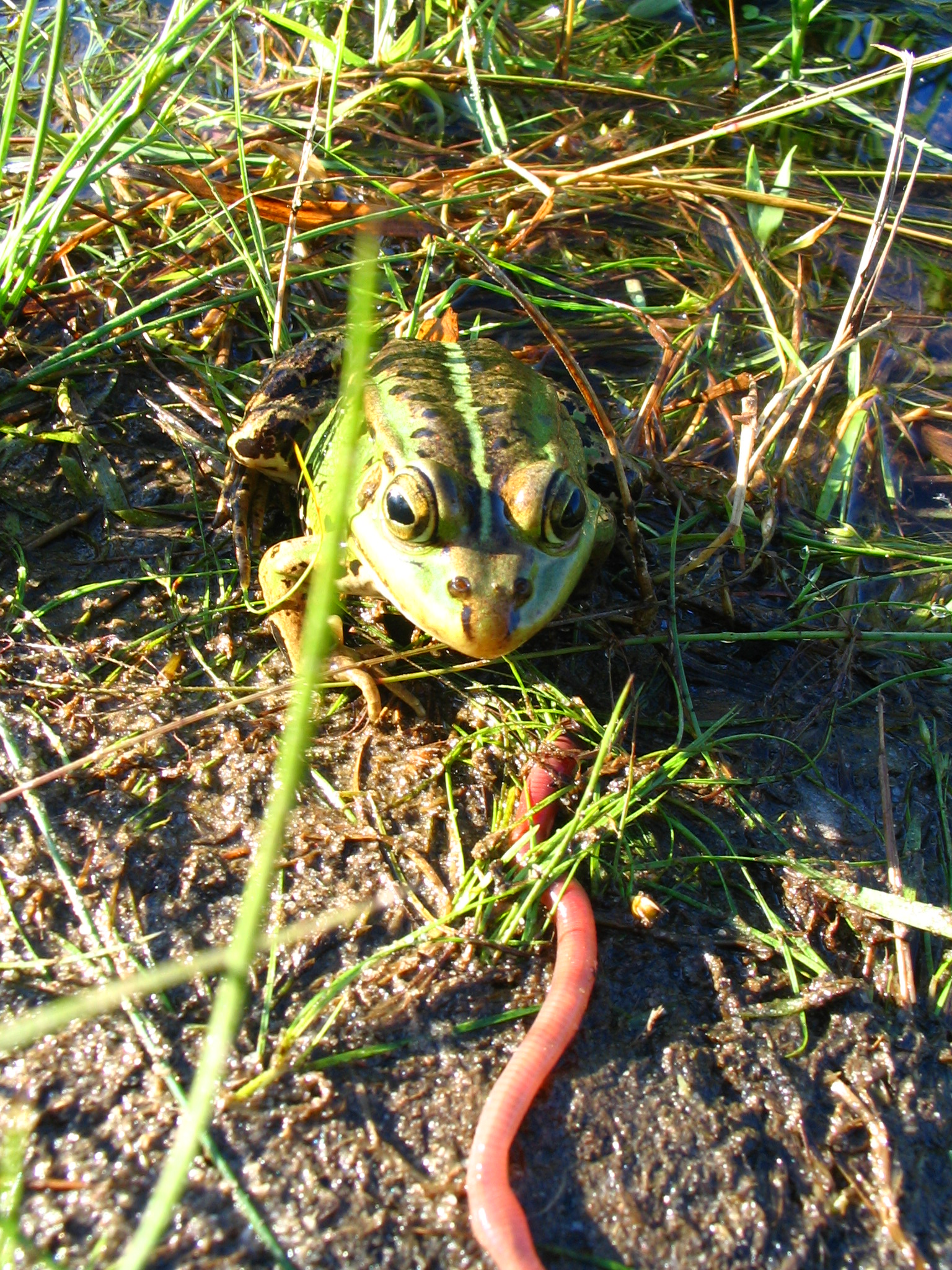
Invertebrates such as this earthworm are the main prey of the pool frog

A cathemeral animal, the pool frog is active during both day and night. It is a largely aquatic species that spends much of its time in water, but often spreads out into the surrounding land to feed at night. This species predominantly hunts on land, with a study conducted in Croatia finding that 77.6% of prey taken is terrestrial. However, prey may also be captured in water, and frogs living in permanent pools eat relatively large amounts of aquatic prey.

This species eats a wide range of invertebrates, with arthropods making up 90.1 to 97.3% of its diet; the exact value varies between different regions and populations, as does the types of arthropods predominantly fed on. Pool frogs are opportunistic predators and do not selectively hunt specific prey, thus their diets are commonly dominated by the most easily available invertebrates in their local area and shift seasonally. They mostly eat the adult forms of invertebrates, likely as these are more active, though populations that eat large portions of insect larvae are also known (for example, caterpillars of geometer moths were recorded to make up over half the diet of one Serbian population). Vertebrate prey is rarely consumed, with multiple studies not detecting any sign of it being eaten by their sampled pool frogs at all. Even so, cannibalism has been recorded in this species. A Romanian study found that plant matter is common in the stomach contents of pool frogs, but this is likely ingested unintentionally when the frog eats invertebrates. Vegetation only makes up a small portion of the frog's stomach contents, with a Serbian study calculating that just 2.17% of the stomach content volume consists of it, but it may provide some nutritional value as it appears partly digested. Compared to the males, female pool frogs feed on a wider range of prey species.

=== Predators and parasites ===
Many different types of animals are known to feed on pool frogs. The tadpoles are susceptible to attacks from fish and aquatic invertebrates such as dragonfly nymphs. While pool frog populations can breed in ponds that have cyprinid fish, they cannot do so if larger predatory fish such as northern pike and brown trout are present, with the latter species known to wipe the frogs out from ponds if they are introduced. Various birds such as ducks, gulls, crows, herons and reed warblers also prey on both adult pool frogs and their tadpoles. The grey heron is a particularly notable avian predator, and measures to prevent it feeding on the frogs have been considered during conservation projects. The Eurasian otter is an opportunistic carnivore known to eat pool frogs, and while it does not preferentially seek amphibian prey, a high predation rate may occur when one comes across a breeding aggregation of frogs by chance. Snakes are also known predators of the pool frog, with the grass snake being the primary reptilian predator of this amphibian in some areas.

Throughout its life, the pool frog serves as a host for many types of parasites, which occur in a wide range of body parts. Studies conducted in the Volga basin of Russia have found 19 species of trematode worms to infect adult pool frogs. Depending on the species, these may occur in the bladder, mouth, digestive tract or lungs, with the three most common being Pneumonoeces variegatus, Opisthioglyphe ranae and Diplodiscus subclavatus. In the same region, ten other trematode species are recorded to parasitize the tadpoles (none of which are present in the adult frogs), which affect other parts such as the body cavity, muscles, pericardium and the serous fluid that coats internal organs. Nematodes (another group of worms) are also known parasites of the pool frog, with nine species recorded to infect individuals in the Volga basin. Most of these nematodes are transmitted through the soil and thus parasitize only adult frogs, though one species (Cosmocerca commutata) affects both adults and tadpoles. Parasite infection varies between different habitats, with a study conducted in Mordovia finding that pool frogs in river floodplains are parasitized by both a wider variety of worm species and a higher number of individual worms than frogs in forest ponds are.

The freshwater clam Sphaerium nucleus sometimes attaches to the toes of pool frogs. This happens when a frog places its toe between the valves of the clam (which are normally open to allow feeding) which shut in response to this, and the clam can be translocated to a new pond if the frog moves to one. This relationship is considered parasitic as it is harmful to the frog, impeding movement and reproductive behaviour, and the affected toe is often lost after several days.

== Conservation ==
The International Union for Conservation of Nature (IUCN) first assessed the pool frog in 2004, with subsequent assessments published in 2009 and 2022. The Union listed its conservation status as Least Concern in all assessments, as its wide distribution and presumably large population suggest that it is at relatively low risk of global extinction. Even so, its numbers are believed to be declining across its range. The loss of its wetland habitats to agricultural intensification, urbanisation and pollution pose a threat to this species, as do introduced species of predatory fish colonising the pools in which it breeds. Harvesting as a food source has also contributed to the decline of this species in some regions, with those in Serbia and Montenegro having been overexploited for the commercial trade of frog legs. Pool frog populations have declined far more drastically in some parts of Europe than in others, such that certain countries consider this species to be locally endangered.

=== In Norway ===
The first record of pool frogs in Norway was made in 1986, when they were found in what was then Aust-Agder county (now merged with Vest-Agder to form Agder county) in the far south of the country. Individuals in Norway belong to the northern clade of the European pool frog and their distribution in the country is extremely limited, having only been found in a few small lakes in Agder. The Norwegian population has varied greatly between years since surveys began in 1996, with 130 adults recorded at its highest point. A slightly lower count of 115 adults was recorded in 2007, but the population decreased dramatically starting the following year and reached an all-time low of 17 adults in 2019, declining by 85% in this period. Because of this, the pool frog has become one of the rarest vertebrates in Norway and is listed as Critically Endangered on the Norwegian Red List. Acid rain is thought to have wiped the frogs out from much of their Norwegian range during the 20th Century, though this threat has reduced by 80 to 85% since 1980. Habitat degradation via wetland draining, the upfilling of small ponds, heavy machinery usage in forestry, and pollution has posed a greater threat since then. The spread and stocking of predatory fish has also contributed to their decline, and this has almost completely wiped the frogs out from one site.

To prevent the local extinction of the pool frog from Norway, the county governor of Aust-Agder and Vest-Agder was asked by the Norwegian Environment Agency in 2017 to start a captive breeding programme. Such a programme was then implemented at Kristiansand Zoo, and some of the frogs that were bred and reared have already been released to strengthen wild populations. Habitat restoration work has also been done at sites in Agder where pool frogs are present, with ponds being excavated for them to inhabit and the stocked fish which prey on them eradicated. In particular, brown trout in these ponds (which may have been released intentionally) have been eliminated using gill nets.

=== In the UK ===
The northern clade of the European pool frog is native to the UK and was once widespread in the East Anglia region of England. Perhaps the oldest historical record of this animal in the country is from the county of Norfolk, where it was noted to be "pretty generally diffused" by 1820. Museum specimens confirm that a colony was present at Rockland All Saints and Stow Bedon near the Norfolk town of Thetford in the mid-1800s. A second colony was confirmed in Fowlmere Fen, Cambridgeshire in 1843, though anecdotes from local people suggest that pool frogs were present here since before the 1800s. Draining of the fen caused the Fowlmere colony to die out by 1847, and the Thetford colony was rediscovered in the 1960s, by which point it was the only remaining northern pool frog population left in the UK. However, many experts at the time believed the pool frog was not native to England, largely because individuals from southern Europe are known to have been introduced to Britain historically, so no conservation action was done for the Thetford pool frogs throughout the 20th Century. By the time the East Anglian pool frogs were proven to be native in 2005, such neglect had already led the northern clade of the species to become locally extinct from England; a series of dry summers combined with reduced grazing and shrub encroachment had reduced the number of suitable ponds at the Thetford site, where the frog had last been seen in 1994 and not found in the extensive surveys carried out in the subsequent decade. Although non-northern clade populations of pool frogs have established in parts of the UK from escaped or released individuals, these are considered non-native and thus are of no conservation value.

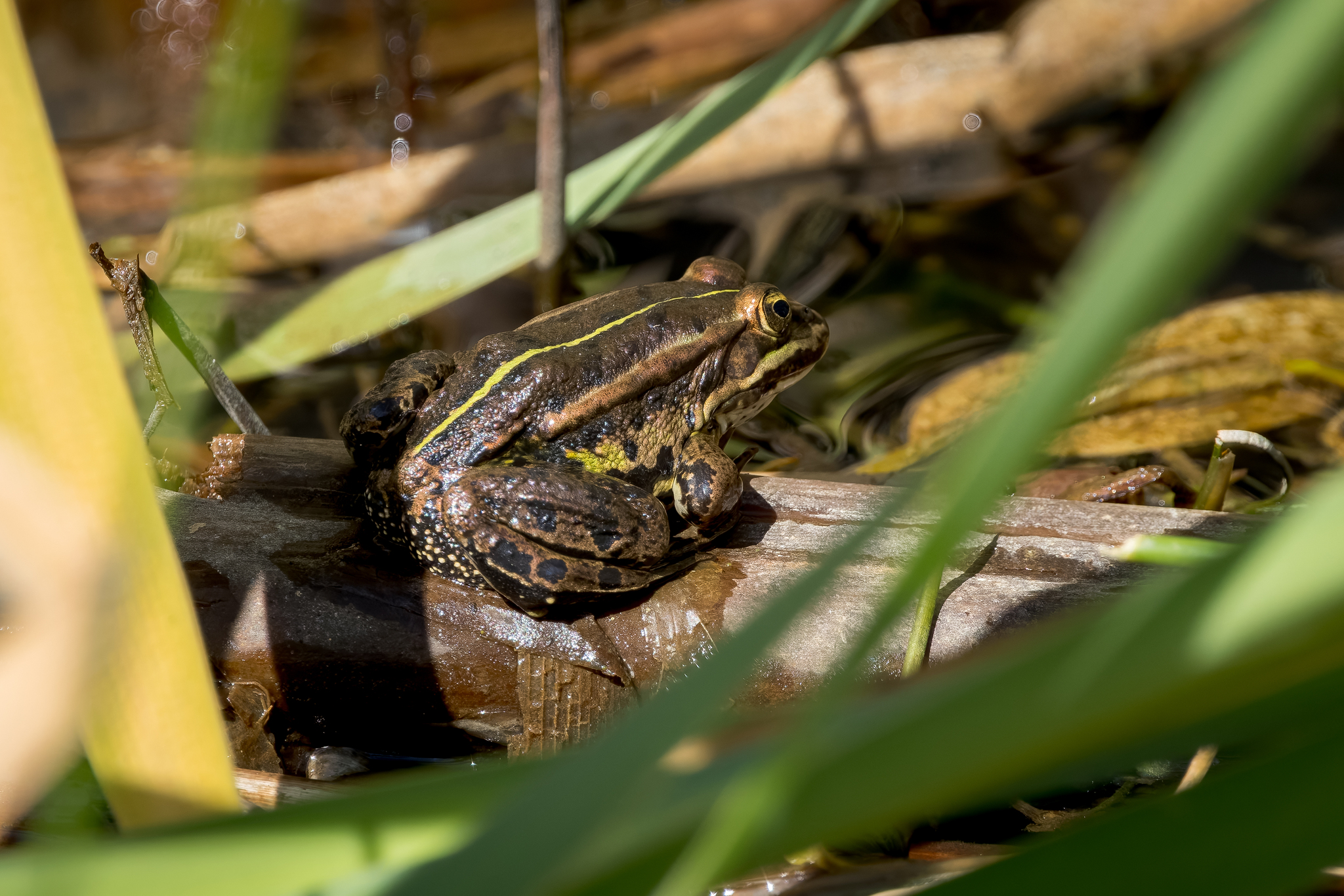
Northern clade individual belonging to the reintroduced English population seen in Norfolk in 2025

Upon confirmation that northern pool frogs were native to England, English Nature and the Herpetological Conservation Trust proposed that a reintroduction project be carried out. A mixed woodland site near Thetford with many periglacial ponds was selected as a location for this introduction, and vegetation was cleared from it in 2003 and 2004 to make the area suitable for the frogs to inhabit. The decision was made to collect pool frogs of various life stages in Sweden (as Swedish pool frogs also belong to the northern clade and thus are closely related to the extinct English populations) and translocate them to the introduction site near Thetford. Such translocations were done over a 4-year period from 2005 to 2008, and a population of 67 adults which bred regularly was established at the Thetford site by 2016. Starting in 2012, some pool frog eggs would be collected from the Thetford site and reared in captivity until they had developed into pre-metamorphic tadpoles, at which point they would be released back onto the site. This method, known as headstarting, greatly increases tadpole survival rates, thus allowing the English population of pool frogs to increase more rapidly.

In 2015, a plan to introduce northern pool frogs to a second site in England so that their range and population could increase was announced. The selected site was Thompson Common in Norfolk, near where the last individual of the original English population was found. The site is managed by the Norfolk Wildlife Trust (NWT), which restored the habitat by excavating ponds that had been buried. Partnering with the Amphibian and Reptile Conservation Trust, the NWT took eggs from the Thetford site and headstarted them, with the reared tadpoles released onto the Common in 2021.
