= Great Eastern Pingo Trail =

Park in the United Kingdom

Coordinates: 52.504°N 0.841°E

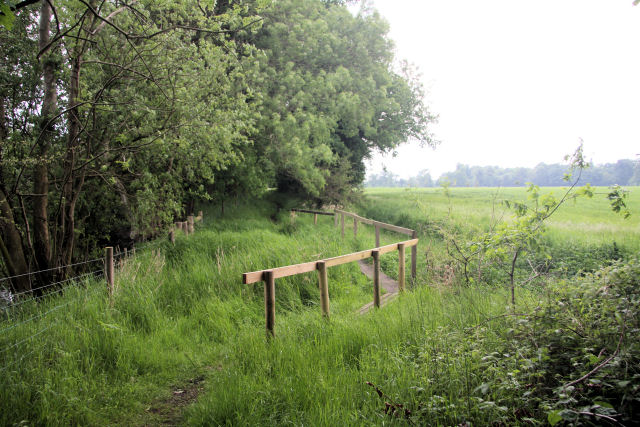
- Interactive map of Great Eastern Pingo Trail
- Type: Local Nature Reserve
- Location: Great Hockham, Norfolk
- OS grid: TL 929 934
- Area: 4.2 hectares (10 acres)

Great Eastern Pingo Trail is 9.2 kilometres (5.7 miles) long footpath along a disused railway line north of Thetford in Norfolk. It is a 4.2-hectare (10-acre) Local Nature Reserve, and it crosses three Sites of Special Scientific Interest, Thompson Water, Carr and Common, Breckland Forest and Cranberry Rough, Hockham. It also crosses Thompson Common, which is a nature reserve managed by the Norfolk Wildlife Trust and is a Nature Conservation Review site, Grade I. It further crosses Norfolk Valley Fens Special Area of Conservation and Breckland Special Protection Area.

This site has around 300 shallow pools which formed when the ice within pingos melted at the end of the last ice age. There is a mosaic of habitats with a large lake, Thompson Water, at the western end.
