= Lorenzo Camerano =

Italian scientist

Lorenzo Camerano (9 April 1856 – 22 November 1917) was an Italian herpetologist and entomologist.

== Life ==
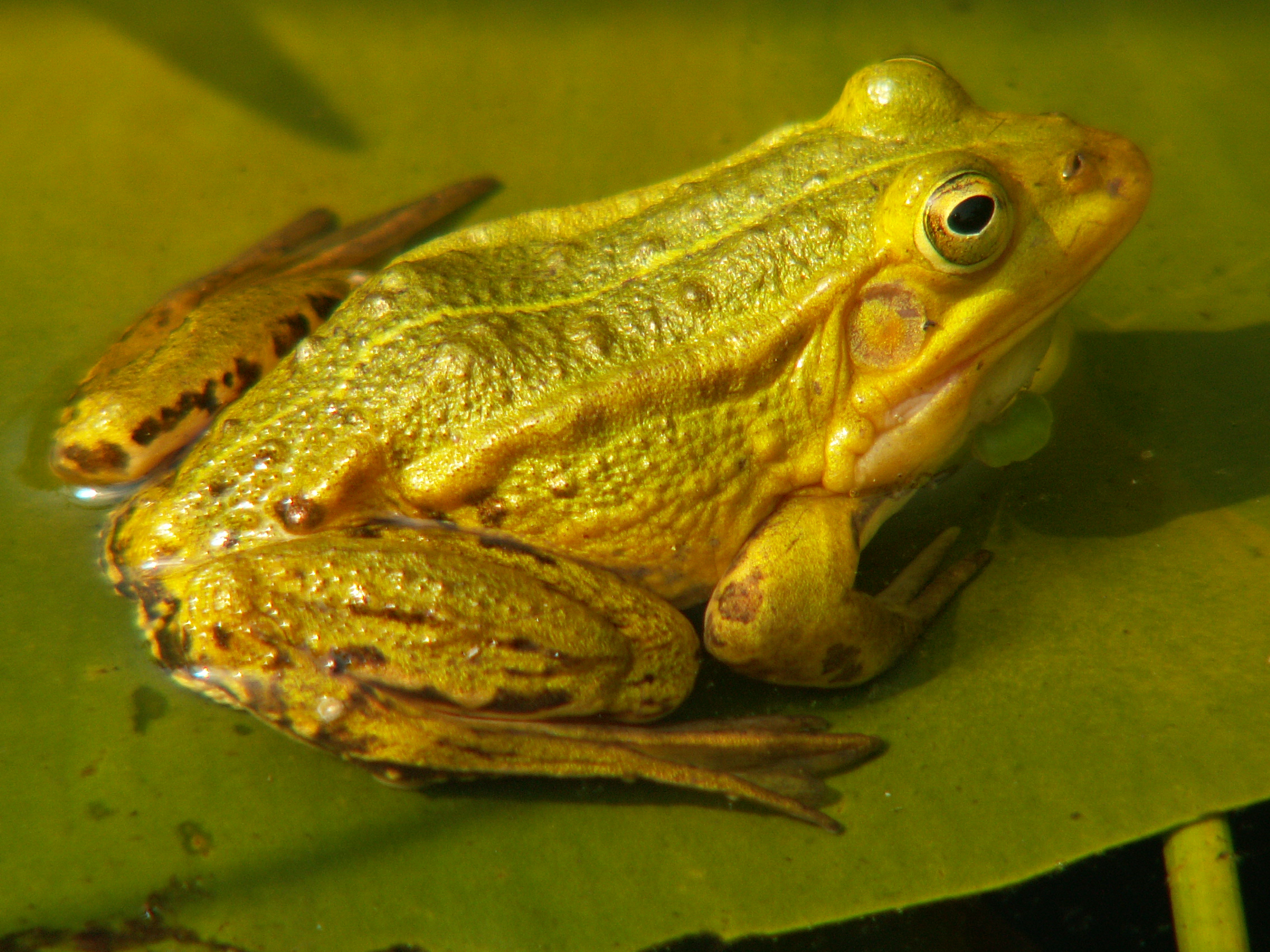
Rana lessonae, one of the several species studied by Lorenzo Camerano

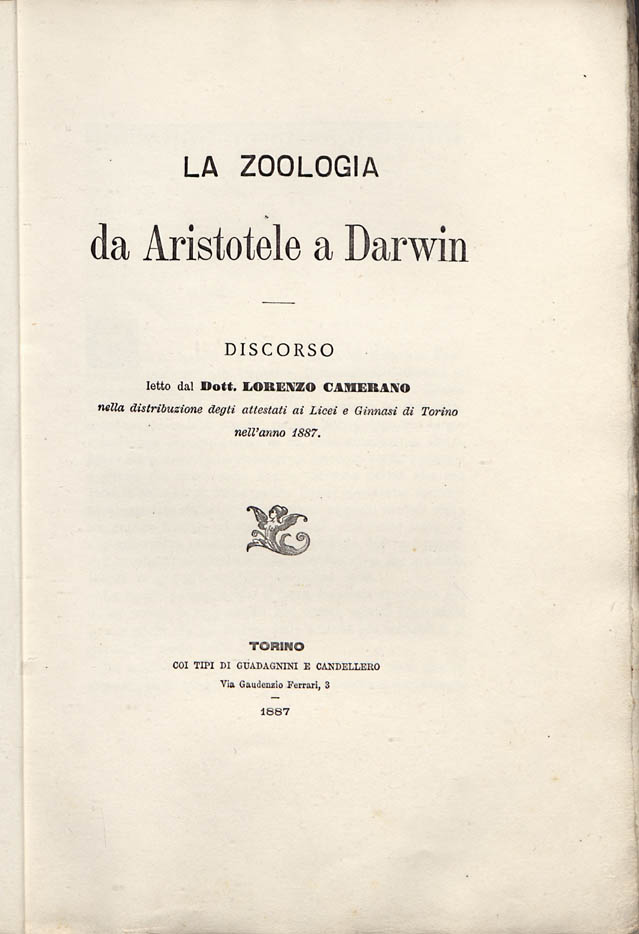
La zoologia da Aristotele a Darwin, 1887

Camerano was born in Biella on 9 April 1856. He studied in Bologna and Turin, where he settled in order to take, between 1871 and 1873, a painting course held by Fontanesi at the local Art Academy.

Camerano worked as a painter for the Turin Zoology Museum, then directed by the great zoologist Michele Lessona. Fascinated by the strong personality of Lessona, he started a natural sciences course at the University of Turin and graduated in 1878. After having held several positions as assistant he became professor in 1880 and attained a permanent tenure in Cagliari University. A little later he went back to Turin where he was assigned the chair of comparative anatomy, that he held till 1915. Camerano also was chancellor of the University of Turin between 1907 and 1910, and was elected an Italian senator in 1909.
Besides his large scientific production (more than 300 titles), which included documenting the first food web, he founded scientific journals and a marine biology institute in Rapallo. Camerano strongly defended Darwin's ideas and was member of several national and international scientific institutions.

He died on 22 November 1917 in Turin.

== Works ==
- La zoologia da Aristotele a Darwin (in Italian). Turin: Guadagnini & Candellero. 1887.
