= Hockham Mere =

Former lake in Norfolk, England

Hockham Mere is the site of a former lake, >400 metres diameter, in Norfolk, England. Its biogenic sediments contain a late-Devensian & Holocene pollen record.

The lake was 1.2 miles (1.9 km) west of Great Hockham in Breckland. It formed over 10,000 years ago, probably by dissolution and collapse of the underlying chalk bedrock. Worked flint tools discovered on the fringes of the former lake suggest that it was an area of significant Mesolithic occupation. In Tudor times it was a large lake, and was drained over the next two centuries. It had dried up by the middle of the 18th century. It is now an area of swampy land and carr woodland, known as Cranberry Rough.

== Pollen data ==
Hockham Mere pollen data shows the rates of change in levels of vegetation using pollen samples from the Holocene period.

This data can be analysed using temperature proxies to help determine climate change in the area at that time. These proxies can be the amount of pollen found in the sample, as more pollen would indicate higher flora productivity which would suggest a warmer climate. The same can be seen if data shows negligible amounts of pollen which would suggest a cooler climate. These are proxies for temperature, and not an accurate record as there are many variances that cannot be monitored easily.
