= Cranberry Rough, Hockham =

UK Site of Special Scientific Interest

Coordinates: 52.505°N 0.845°E

- Site of Special Scientific Interest
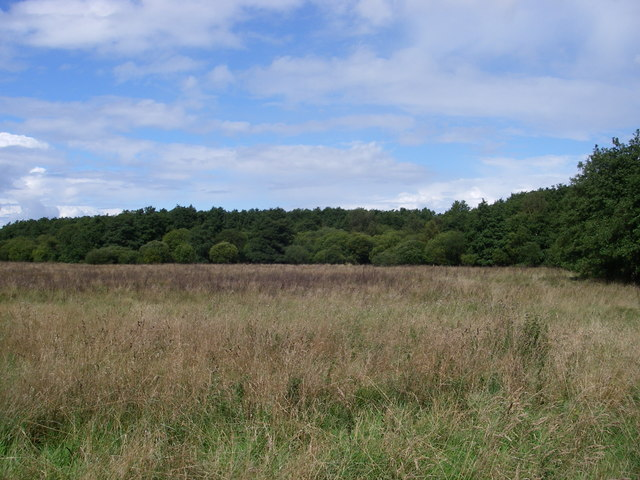
- Location of Cranberry Rough, Hockham.
- Area of search: Norfolk, England
- Grid reference: TL 932 935
- Interest: Biological; Geological
- Area: 81.1 hectares (200 acres)
- Notification date: 1984
- Location map: Magic Map

Cranberry Rough is an 81.1-hectare (200-acre) biological and geological Site of Special Scientific Interest in the parish of Hockham, east of Attleborough in Norfolk, England. It is a Nature Conservation Review site, Grade 2, and the Great Eastern Pingo Trail, which is a Local Nature Reserve, goes through the site. Part of it is a Geological Conservation Review site, and it is part of the Breckland Special Protection Area.

The area is the site of a former lake known as Hockham Mere, which was drained and dried up by the middle of the 18th century. It has swamp woodland, grassland, tall fen and a network of ditches and pools, with a diverse range of wetland plants and insects, especially butterflies, dragonflies and damselflies. Large areas are covered with sphagnum mosses. Its biogenic sediments contain a late-Devensian & Holocene pollen record.
