= Lake Agia =

Artificial lake in Crete, Greece

- Lake Ayia
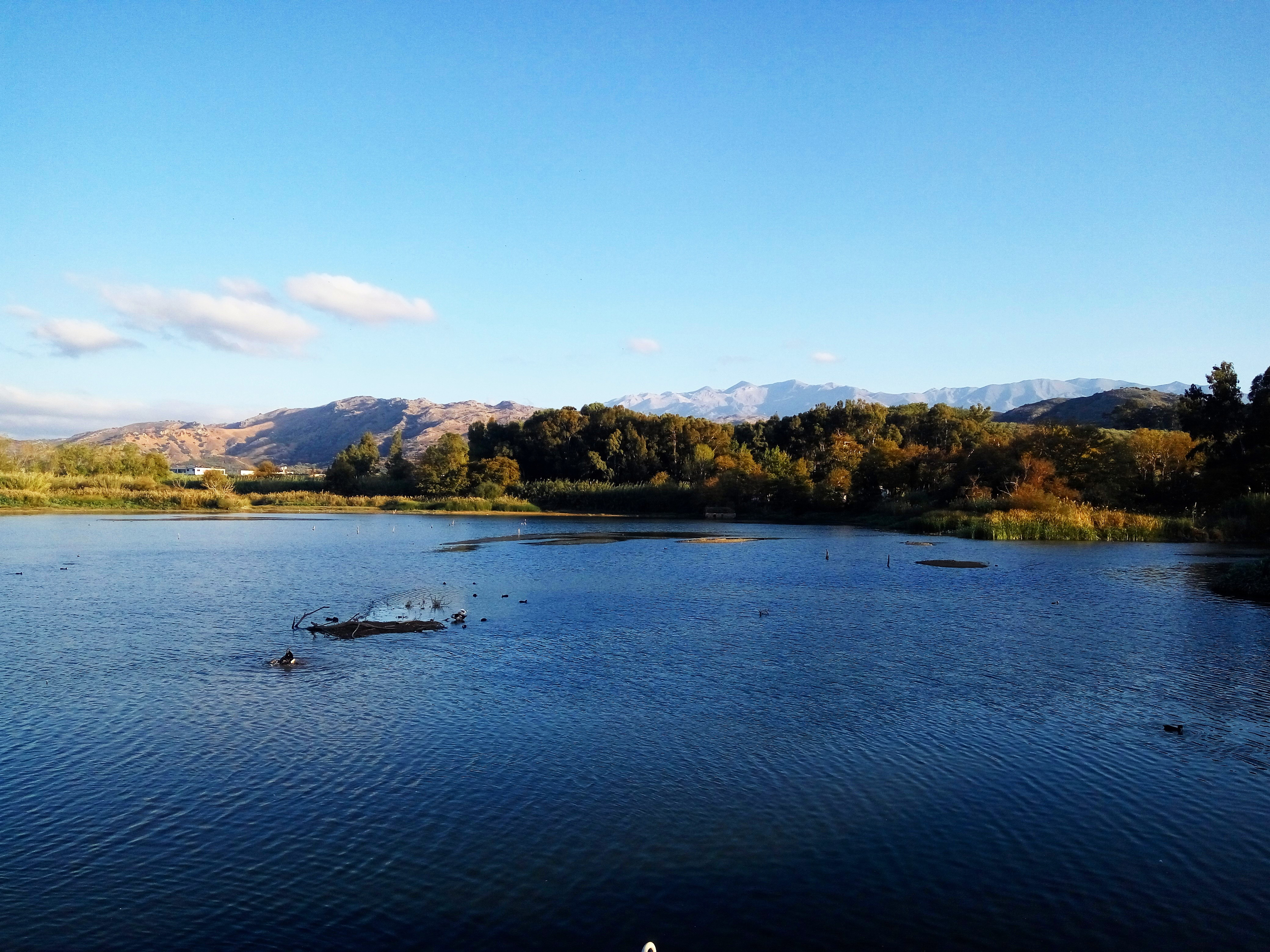
- View of the lake

- Location within Greece
- Location: Crete
- Coordinates: 35.4762°N 23.9335°E
- Type: reservoir
- Primary inflows: Xekolomenos tributary
- Primary outflows: Xekolomenos tributary
- Basin countries: Greece
- Surface area: 0.45 square kilometers (0.17 sq mi)
- Surface elevation: 34 meters (112 ft)

Lake Agia, also known as Lake Ayia (Greek: Λίμνη Αγιάς or Αγυιάς), is an artificial lake on the island of Crete, in Greece. It was created in the early 20th century as part of a hydroelectric power plant which is no longer operational. The lake is now an important habitat for the local flora and fauna and it is part of the Natura 2000 network of protected areas.

== History ==
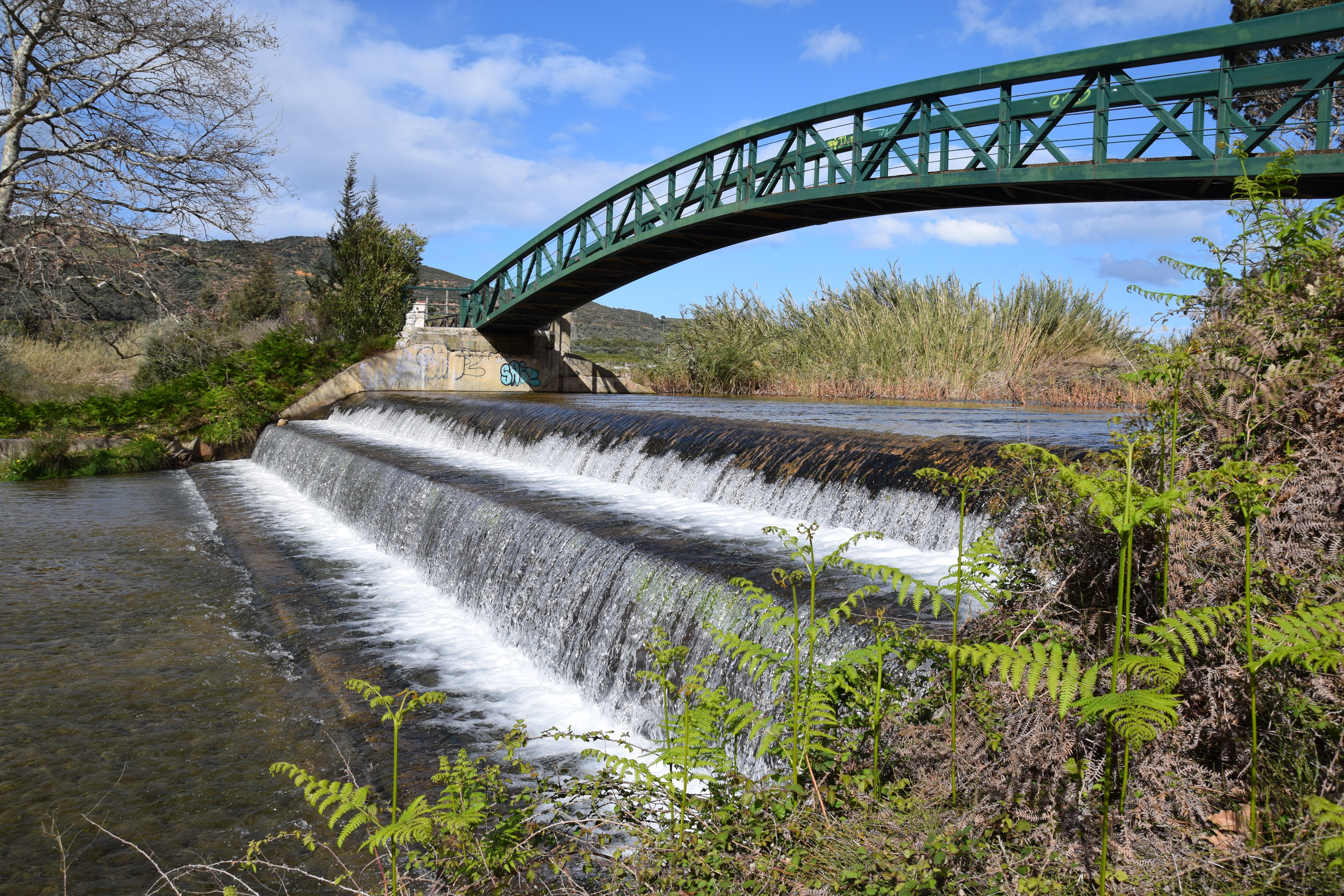
The bridge and the artificial waterfall at Lake Agia

The area used to be a swamp and it was turned into a lake in the 1920s, in order to supply with water the Small Hydroelectric Station of Agia (Greek: Μικρός Υδροηλεκτρικός Σταθμός Αγυιάς, ΜΥΗΣ). The station operated for 76 years from 1929 to 2005 and it was then repurposed as a museum. For the visitors there are two lakeside cafes and a significant part of the bank is covered by a wooden pathway, along which there are some birdwatching platforms.

== Geography ==
Lake Agia is located in the Chania regional unit on the island of Crete, 9 kilometres (5.6 mi) west of Chania and next to the village of Agia, after which it was named. It covers an area of 450,000 square metres (4,800,000 sq ft) and it is located at an altitude of 34 metres (112 ft) above sea level. Like all of Crete, it lies within the Crete Mediterranean forests ecoregion. South of the lake is the Fasas Valley.

== Flora ==
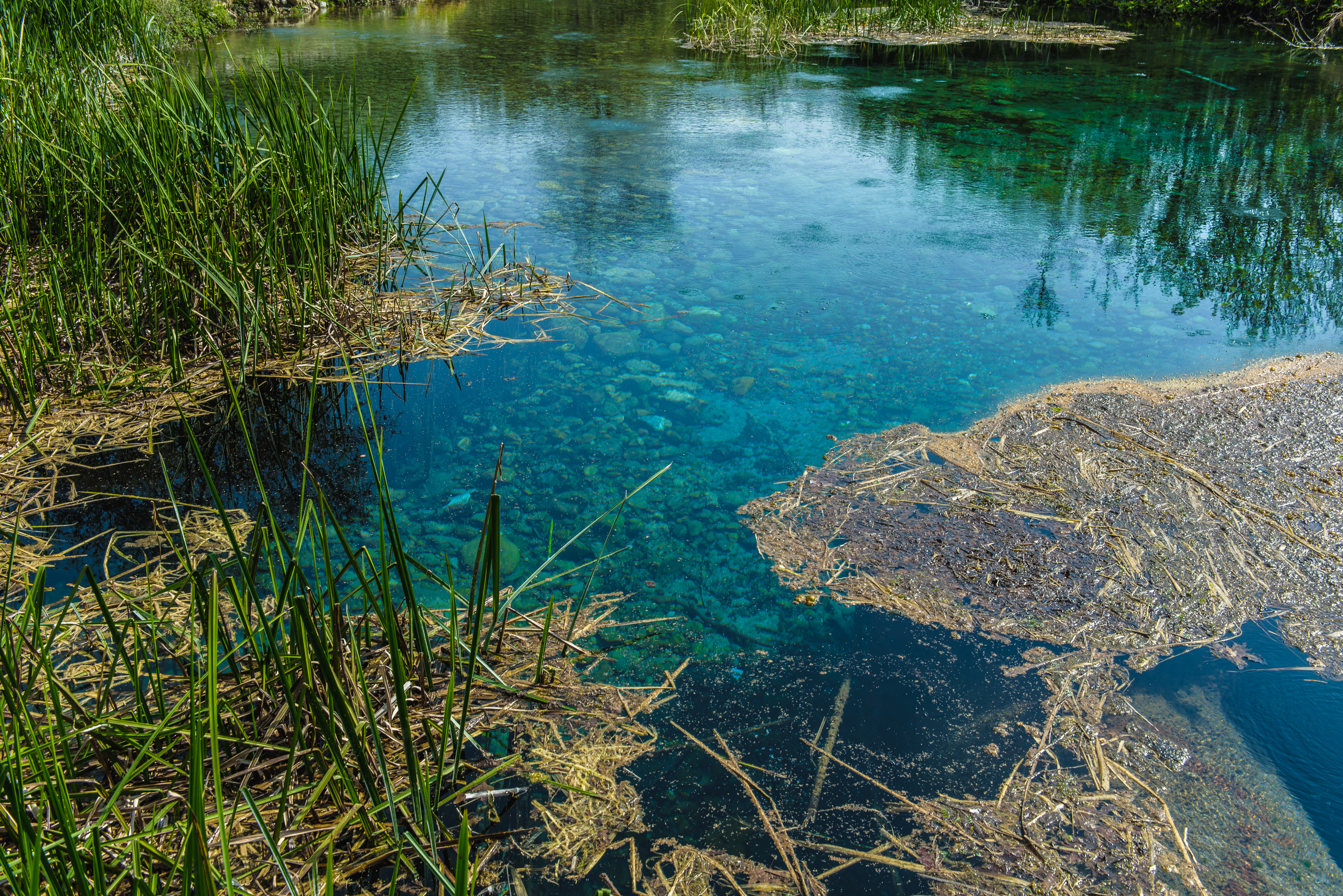
A location at Lake Agia's bank

In Lake Agia 130 plant species can be found, with a large part of its bank being covered by reedbeds, while willows and plane trees are forming a riparian woodland. Many flowers are present in the area as well, like the Cynoglossum creticum and the introduced Oxalis pes-caprae. Papsalum distichum, a species of weed native to Latin America is also a common sight. This introduced species is displacing some the local plants and efforts are being made to remove it and prevent it from spreading to the rest of the island.

== Fauna ==
=== Birds ===
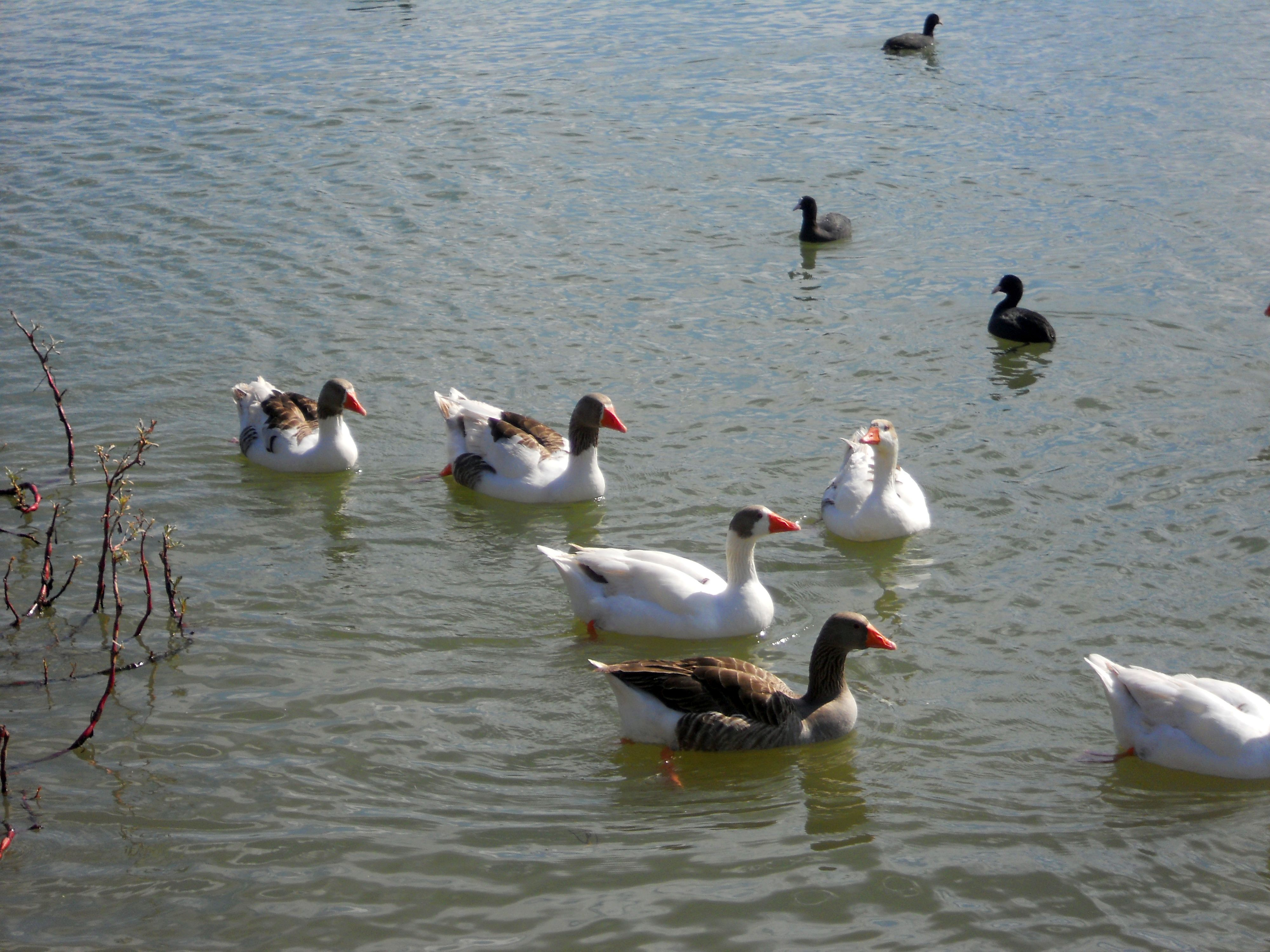
Birds at Lake Agia

Lake Agia is one of the most important locations for the avifauna of Crete, with over 200 species having been observed there. Some examples are the Baillon's crake, the purple heron, the ferruginous duck, the Eleonora's falcon, the sedge warbler as well as the European turtle dove, a species that is threatened with extinction according to the IUCN Red List.

=== Mammals ===
Being surrounded by cultivated land, Lake Agia is isolated from any forested areas or shrublands and as a result the large mammal species of the island, like the Cretan ibex and the Cretan wildcat, are absent from the area. Some mammals that are found at the lake are the northern white-breasted hedgehog, the European hare, the least weasel and the beech marten.

=== Amphibians ===
The lake is home to many frogs and toads, like the European tree frog and the European green toad. A large population of Cretan frogs also inhabited the lake in the past but they have been almost completely dislocated since introduction of the American bullfrog to the ecosystem. The American bullfrogs of Lake Agia are the descendants of some individuals that where released in 2000 by a businessman from Chania who bred them in captivity for the production of frog legs. The Cretan frogs, being four times smaller and a lot less aggressive than the American bullfrogs, have lost their habitat in the lake to the invasive bullfrogs. This is one of the main reasons for their categorization as vulnerable by the IUCN in its Red List of Threatened Species.

=== Reptiles ===
The most common reptiles in Lake Agia and the surrounding area are Mediterranean house geckos and dice snakes, while the population of Balkan terrapins nowadays has to share the lake with a large number of red-eared sliders, an introduced and invasive subspecies of the pond slider, originally found in North America.

=== Fishes ===
The waters of Lake Agia are home to indigenous Cretan fish and eels, as well some introduced species like the western mosquitofish and the goldfish. Its inclusion in the Natura 2000 European network of protected areas has banned both fishing and hunting in the lake.
