= Thompson Water, Carr and Common =

UK Site of Special Scientific Interest

Coordinates: 52.505°N 0.845°E

- Site of Special Scientific Interest
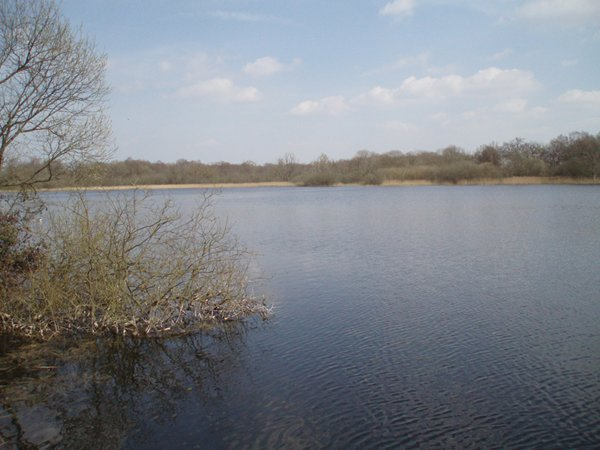
- Thompson Water
- Location of Thompson Water, Carr and Common.
- Area of search: Norfolk
- Grid reference: TL 929 956
- Interest: Biological
- Area: 154.7 hectares (382 acres)
- Notification date: 1988
- Location map: Magic Map

Thompson Water, Carr and Common is a 154.7-hectare (382-acre) biological Site of Special Scientific Interest north of Thetford in Norfolk, England. Most of it is managed by the Norfolk Wildlife Trust as Thompson Common. It is a Nature Conservation Review site, Grade I, and part of the Norfolk Valley Fens Special Area of Conservation. It is crossed by the Great Eastern Pingo Trail Local Nature Reserve.

This grassland site, located in the valley of a tributary of the River Wissey, contains a number of ponds left by melted pingos: damp, water-filled depressions formed by the melting of ice within these geological formations at the end of the last glaciation. It also features a lake called Thompson Water, which, along with its surrounding reed swamp, is important for breeding birds.

The site is open to the public.
