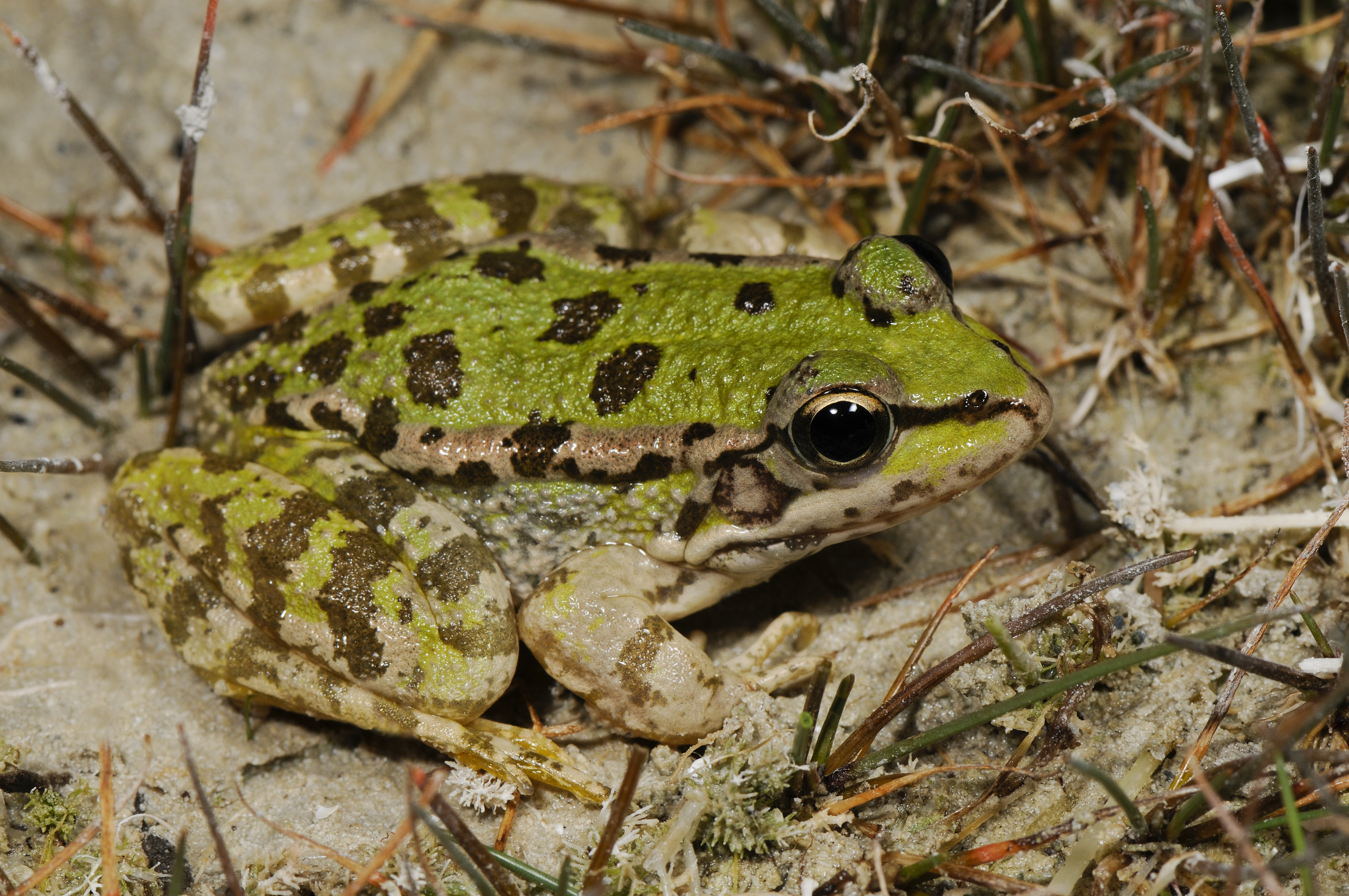

Conservation status
- Endangered (IUCN 3.1)

Scientific classification
- Kingdom: Animalia
- Phylum: Chordata
- Class: Amphibia
- Order: Anura
- Family: Ranidae
- Genus: Pelophylax
- Species: P. cretensis

Binomial name
- Pelophylax cretensis (Beerli, Hotz, Tunner, Heppich & Uzzell, 1994)

Synonyms
- List: Rana cretensis Beerli, Hotz, Tunner, Heppich & Uzzell, 1994; Rana (Pelophylax) cretensis (Beerli, Hotz, Tunner, Heppich & Uzzell, 1994) Dubois, 1992; Hylarana cretensis (Beerli, Hotz, Tunner, Heppich & Uzzell, 1994) Chen, Murphy, Lathrop, Ngo, Orlov, Ho, and Somorjai, 2005

= Cretan frog =

Species of amphibian

The Cretan frog (Pelophylax cretensis) is an endangered species of frog in the family Ranidae. It is endemic to the Greek island of Crete.

== Taxonomy and evolution ==
The Cretan frog was first recognised as a distinct species in 1994, when a team consisting of Swiss, Austrian and American scientists conducted genetic testing on 41 specimens of it collected during the 1980s. Upon this discovery, the team gave this species the scientific name Rana cretensis, with the specific name referencing the Greek island of Crete where the specimens were collected. An adult male specimen collected in October 1987 in Kastelli, Heraklion was designated as the holotype of this species, and is stored in the Natural History Museum of Geneva under the specimen number MHNG 2543.90. Additionally, five female specimens were designated as paratypes.

Many species that were once included in the genus Rana were moved to separate genera at the beginning of the 21st century, when detailed molecular phylogenetic data made a distinction among the species more clear. In 1992, French zoologist Alain Dubois divided the genus Rana into 33 subgenera, with the Cretan frog being placed in the subgenus Pelophylax under the name Rana (Pelophylax) cretensis. A study published in 2005 further divided the species placed in the genus Rana at the time into several different genera, with those of the subgenus Pelophylax being assigned to the genus Hylarana, thus the Cretan frog was considered to be part of this genus under the name Hylarana cretensis. In 2006, another publication on amphibian taxonomy elevated the rank of Pelophylax from subgenus to genus, a revision which is further supported by a study published the following year, so the scientific name of the Cretan frog was recombined once again into Pelophylax cretensis.

Phylogenetic analysis has revealed that the closest living relatives of the Cretan frog are the members of the marsh frog complex, a group of similar frogs which may represent either closely related species within a species complex or subspecies under a single species (Pelophylax ridibundus). The last common ancestor of the Cretan frog and the marsh frog complex is believed to have lived around 5.4 million years ago, towards the end of the Late Miocene. This timing roughly coincides with the end of the Messinian salinity crisis, when the Zanclean flood would have filled the Mediterranean basin with seawater and isolated Crete as an island from Anatolia. This event would have reproductively isolated the frogs on Crete from their continental relatives and triggered the divergence of the two lineages. The following cladogram shows the position of the Cretan frog among its closest living relatives according to Dufresnes et al. (2024):

- Pelophylax Western Palearctic
  - - - - P. ridibundus marsh frogs
          ⊞Show taxa
          ⊟
          - - P. r. bedriagae
            - - P. r. kurtmuelleri
              - P. r. ridibundus
          - - cf. ridibundus lineages
              - - - P. r. persicus
                  - P. r. terentievi
                - - P. r. caralitanus
                  - - cf. ridibundus
                    - P. r. cerigensis
              - cf. ridibundus
            - P. r. cypriensis
        - P. cretensis
      - P. epeiroticus
    - pool frogs
      - P. lessonae
        - P. l. lessonae
        - P. l. bergeri
      - P. shqipericus
  - - P. perezi
    - P. saharicus

== Description ==
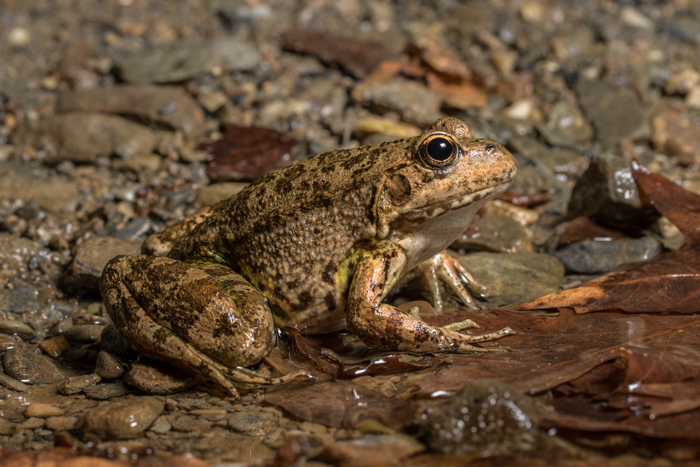
An adult Cretan frog photographed in its natural habitat

It is a medium-sized frog reaching up to 8 cm in length and with a weight of 40 g. The Cretan frog is generally light grey to brown and mottled with brown or olive-grey spots on its back, while the throat and underside of the body are whitish-grey. Occasionally, the upperparts of the Cretan frog may be grass-green with distinct brown spots. The insides of the hind legs are yellow, and the sides of the body may also have yellowish colouration. This species has a prominent dark brown fold of skin down the back. Its skin is smooth and slightly glossy. Males may feature prominent vocal sacs on their throats, especially during breeding season. Its long, muscular hind legs, common to frogs, are a key aspect of their agile swimming and jumping abilities.

== Behavior ==
It is a generally diurnal, shy frog that usually basks out of water and will jump into the water when it feels threatened. Nocturnal behaviors have also been reported, with individuals in some areas being predominantly active after sunset. It is typically solitary in nature and communicates via a sequence of distinct calls. Its lifespan is six to eight years in the wild.

=== Reproduction ===
It mates in spring and females lay their eggs in the water in clusters of a few hundred. Every female frog can lay up to 5000 eggs and they hatch after about a week, depending on water temperature. During breeding season, males develop prominent vocal sacs on their throats and they aggressively defend their territories, employing a variety of strategical calling and physical confrontation.

=== Diet ===
Cretan frogs predominantly consume invertebrates, with a food preference leaning towards aquatic insects, snails, and small crustaceans. They are opportunistic feeders, eying for readily available prey.

== Habitat and distribution ==
It is endemic to the Greek island of Crete, where it is patchily distributed over a wide area. It inhabits altitudes of up to 920 meters (with one unconfirmed record at 1,330 meters above sea level). All of its distribution range lies within the Crete Mediterranean forests ecoregion.

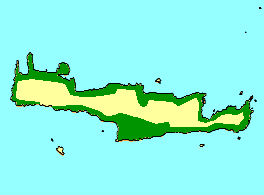
Natural distribution of the Cretan frog on the island of Crete

Its natural habitats are Mediterranean-type shrubby vegetation, rivers, intermittent rivers, swamps, freshwater lakes, intermittent freshwater lakes, freshwater marshes, intermittent freshwater marshes, and plantations.

== Threats and conservation ==
The Cretan frog is listed as an Endangered species in the IUCN Red List of Threatened Species, and its population is declining.

A huge number of Cretan frogs once inhabited Lake Agia, one of the only two freshwater lakes in Crete. However, this population has dangerously decreased since the introduction of the American Bullfrog to the lake. The American Bullfrog, which is endemic to the eastern United States, was brought to the area in order to be bred in captivity for the production of frog legs. In 2000, a businessman from Chania who bred bullfrogs was disappointed by his investment and released all of his frogs into the Lake Agia. The American Bullfrog is four times bigger than the Cretan frog and a lot more aggressive, as a result it is outcompeting the local population of frogs. This has resulted in an almost complete displacement of the Cretan frogs from the lake. The biggest problem is that Lake Agia does not host a natural enemy so to stop this invasive species rapid spread.

The habitat of the Cretan frog in other areas is also under severe threat, being of poor quality, extremely fragmented and decreasing in size, mainly due to new developments for the tourism industry as well as other infrastructure development. Water is also being extracted for agriculture, drying out water bodies and leaving the frogs without the necessary means to eat, reproduce or live.

Although this species inhabits a number of protected areas, some of these are not currently well managed or protected correctly for conserving species and as a result greater actions should be taken in order for the Cretan frog's population to recover.
