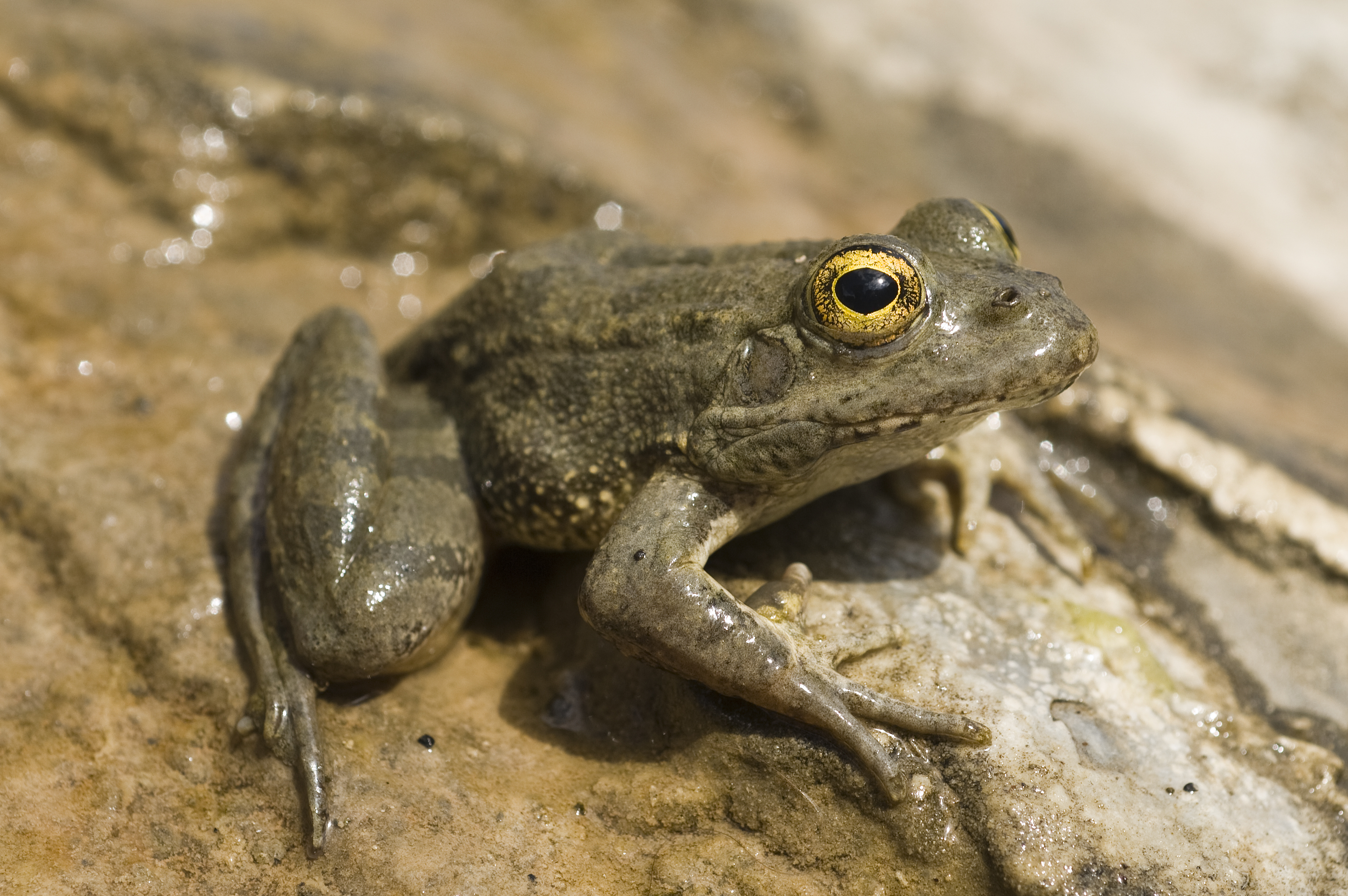
- Pelophylax cerigensis

Conservation status
- Endangered (IUCN 3.1)

Scientific classification
- Kingdom: Animalia
- Phylum: Chordata
- Class: Amphibia
- Order: Anura
- Family: Ranidae
- Genus: Pelophylax
- Species: P. cerigensis

Binomial name
- Pelophylax cerigensis (Beerli, Hotz, Tunner, Heppich & Uzzell, 1994)

Synonyms
- Rana cerigensis Beerli, Hotz, Tunner, Heppich & Uzzell, 1994

= Karpathos frog =

Species of amphibian

The Karpathos frog (Pelophylax cerigensis) is a species of frog in the family Ranidae. It is endemic to the islands of Karpathos and Rhodes, South Aegean Sea, Greece. The Karpathos frog was considered to be the most endangered anuran amphibian in Europe, and was until recently classified as Critically endangered, because it was thought its range was restricted to two small rivers in the north part of Karpathos island.

Its natural habitats are Mediterranean-type shrubby vegetation, rivers, intermittent rivers, freshwater lakes, intermittent freshwater lakes, freshwater marshes, intermittent freshwater marshes, arable land and ponds. It is threatened by habitat loss.

== Distribution ==
The Karpathos Frog was formerly considered to be restricted to Karpathos in Greece, but recent research based on analyses of complete mitogenomes found the species to also occur on Rhodes Island. On Karpathos it has a very restricted distribution (currently found in four localities within an area of less than 10 km2, near Olympos village), whilst on Rhodes it appears to be more widespread. It can be found from sea level up to 500 m above sea level. Its area of occupancy is estimated at 128 km2 and its extent of occurrence is 2,835 km2.

== Taxonomy ==
Historical reports suggested the occurrence of the Karpathos Frog on Rhodos Island. However, uncertainty shrouded the taxonomic identity of this Rhodos Island subpopulation. Recent evidence based on complete mitogenome sequencing showed that individuals from Karpathos and Rhodos form a well-supported monophyletic group with very low genetic distance between them, thus placing the Rhodos population to P. cerigensis and not to P. bedriagae.

== Diet ==
This species preys on beetles, spiders, isopods and various hymenopterans.

== Threats ==
Regarding the Karpathos population, although the sites from which the species is known are fairly remote, even small, low-scale habitat changes could be detrimental to the species due to very small number of individuals. Freshwater habitats are subject to a number of threats such as excessive water abstraction, which is occurring for agricultural purposes, including livestock watering. Water availability is or at least was the main threat. Even in winter, the volume of naturally available water is really limited in the original sites and dispersal to other water bodies across the island is probably problematic due to low reproductive output and limited connectivity. Fires are an additional potential threat, both from locals who use fire to manage their lands and wildfires, which may increase with drier conditions. The species may be vulnerable to climate change, although the effects are not fully understood at a local level at present. A further potential threat is the intensive collection for scientific and research purposes exacerbated by the limited and localised distribution of this species, although there have not been any recorded incidences of this yet. There is some subsistence agriculture (sheep and goat keeping) that is occurring on the island; however, this is actually considered to be beneficial to the species' population as goats do not allow the vegetation to become too dense and their droppings feed the insects that this species preys on. The species ofter falls prey to the native levantine water crab, habitat shrinking and water scarcity force the two species in close quarter, putting further pressure on the threatened amphibian.

Regarding the Rhodes subpopulation, further research is needed in order to determine the specific threats to the species.
