= Wildlife of China =

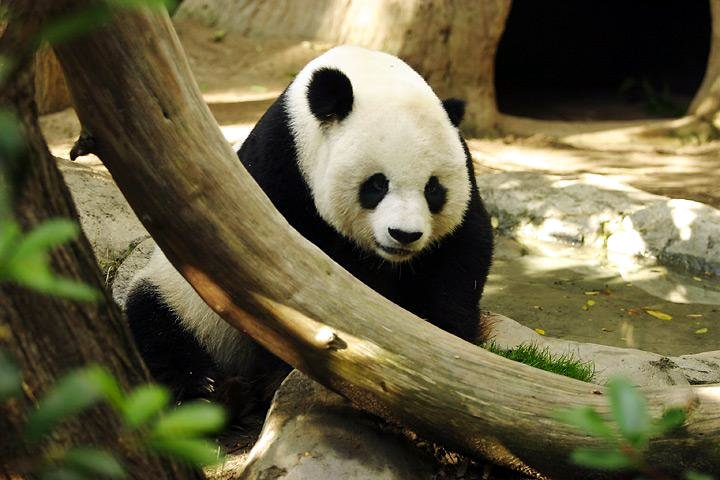
The giant panda is endemic to China, where it is an endangered and protected species.

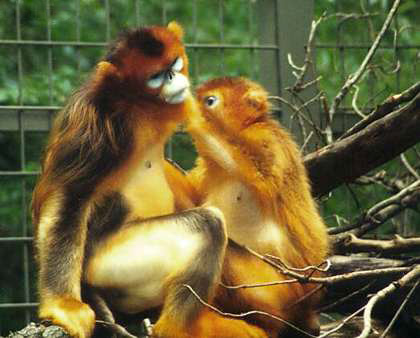
The snub-nosed monkey, another endangered and endemic species

China's vast and diverse landscape is home to a profound variety and abundance of wildlife. As of one of 17 megadiverse countries in the world, China has, according to one measure, 7,516 species of vertebrates including 4,936 fish, 1,269 bird, 562 mammal, 403 reptile and 346 amphibian species. In terms of the number of species, China ranks third in the world in mammals, eighth in birds, seventh in reptiles and seventh in amphibians.

Many species of animals are endemic to China, including the country's most famous wildlife species, the giant panda. In all, about one-sixth of mammal species and two-thirds of amphibian species in China are endemic to the country.

Wildlife in China share habitat with and bear acute pressure from the world's second largest population of humans. At least 840 species are threatened, vulnerable or in danger of local extinction in China, due mainly to human activity such as habitat destruction, pollution and poaching for food, fur and ingredients for traditional Chinese medicine. Endangered wildlife is protected by law, and as of 2005, the country has over 2,349 nature reserves, covering a total area of 149.95 million hectares (578,960 square miles), about 15 percent of China's total land area.

== Mammals ==
=== Primates ===
China is home to 21 primate species including gibbons, macaques, leaf monkeys (including gray langurs), snub-nosed monkeys and lorises. Most of China's primate species are endangered. Both apes and monkeys, particularly gibbons and macaques are prominently featured in Chinese culture, folk religion, art and literature. The monkey is one of the 12 animals of the Chinese zodiac.

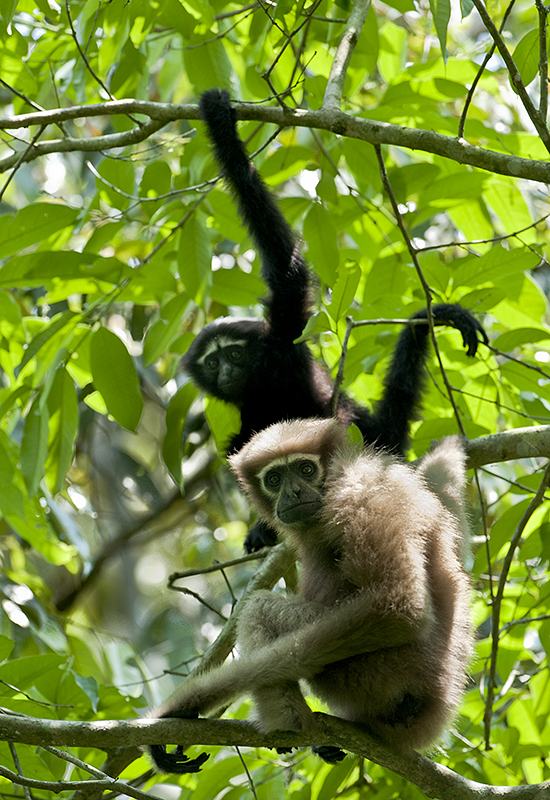
Western hoolock gibbons

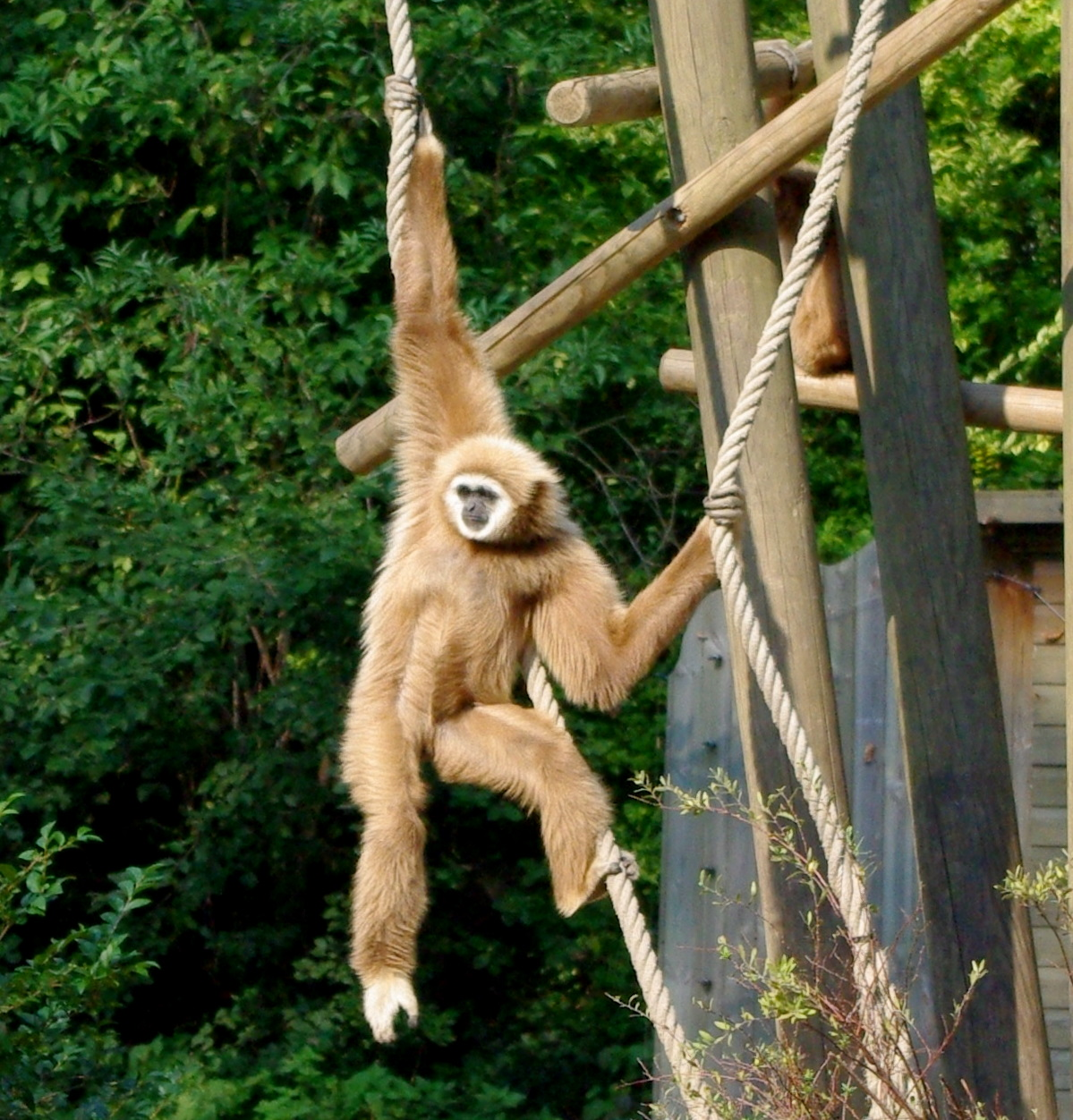
A female lar gibbon

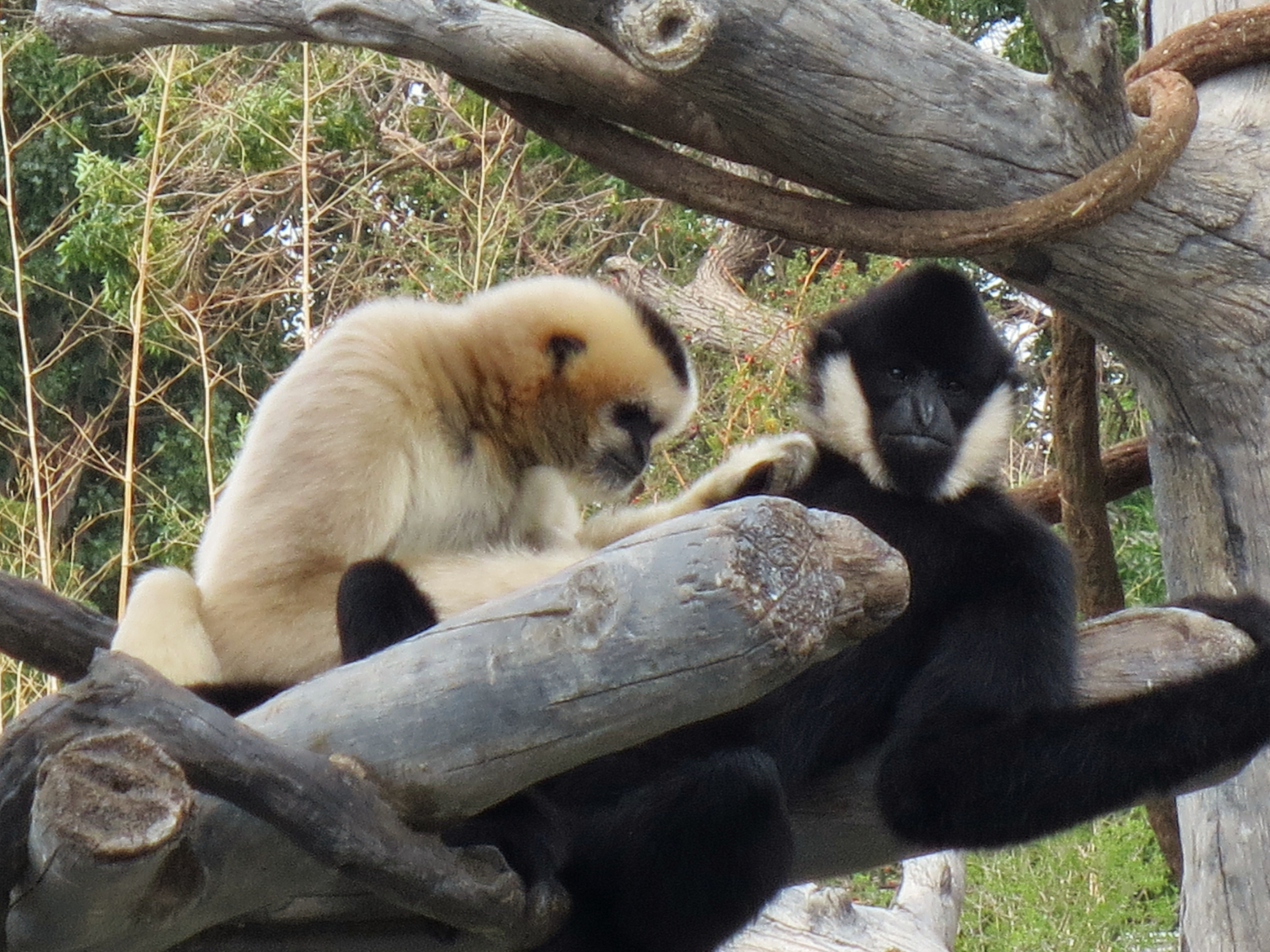
A female northern white-cheeked gibbon grooming a male

The only apes native to China are gibbons. Gibbons are tree dwellers which use their long arms to swing from branches. Gibbons can be recognized by their loud calls, with mating pairs often singing together as a duet.

The Hainan black crested gibbon is among the rarest and most endangered apes. Endemic to the island of Hainan, there are fewer than 30 individuals left in the Bawangling National Nature Reserve. Like many other gibbons, male Hainan black crested gibbons are black in color while females are golden brown. The eastern black crested gibbon is nearly as rare with only 20 or so in the Guangxi Zhuang Autonomous Region along with 30 in neighboring Vietnam. About 99% of this ape's habitat in China has been lost.

The black crested gibbon is found across a greater swath of southwestern China. The Yunnan lar gibbon, a subspecies of the lar or white-handed gibbon, might be extinct in China. The animal was last observed by zoologists in 1988 and its call was last heard by locals in 2002. A survey in November 2007 in the Nangunhe National Nature Reserve yielded no sign of this gibbon.

The northern white-cheeked gibbon is nearly extinct in the wilderness of southern Yunnan where they are hunted by local people as charms of good luck and for their bones which are made into weaving instrument and chopsticks. As of 2008, a captive population of eight northern white-cheeked gibbons was living in the Mengyang Nature Reserve. Two of the individuals were released into the wild but still relied on tourists for food. The eastern hoolock gibbon, which are distinguished by white tufts of hair above the eyebrows, are found in western Yunnan, along the border with Myanmar. The western hoolock gibbon might be found in southeastern Tibet. All gibbons in China are Class I protected species.

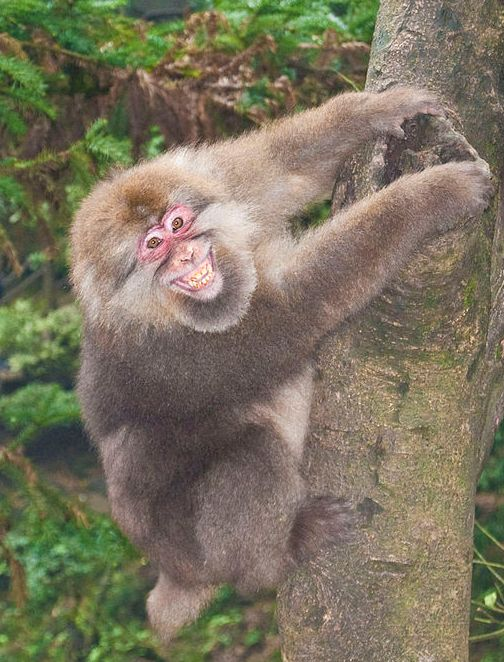
Tibetan macaque

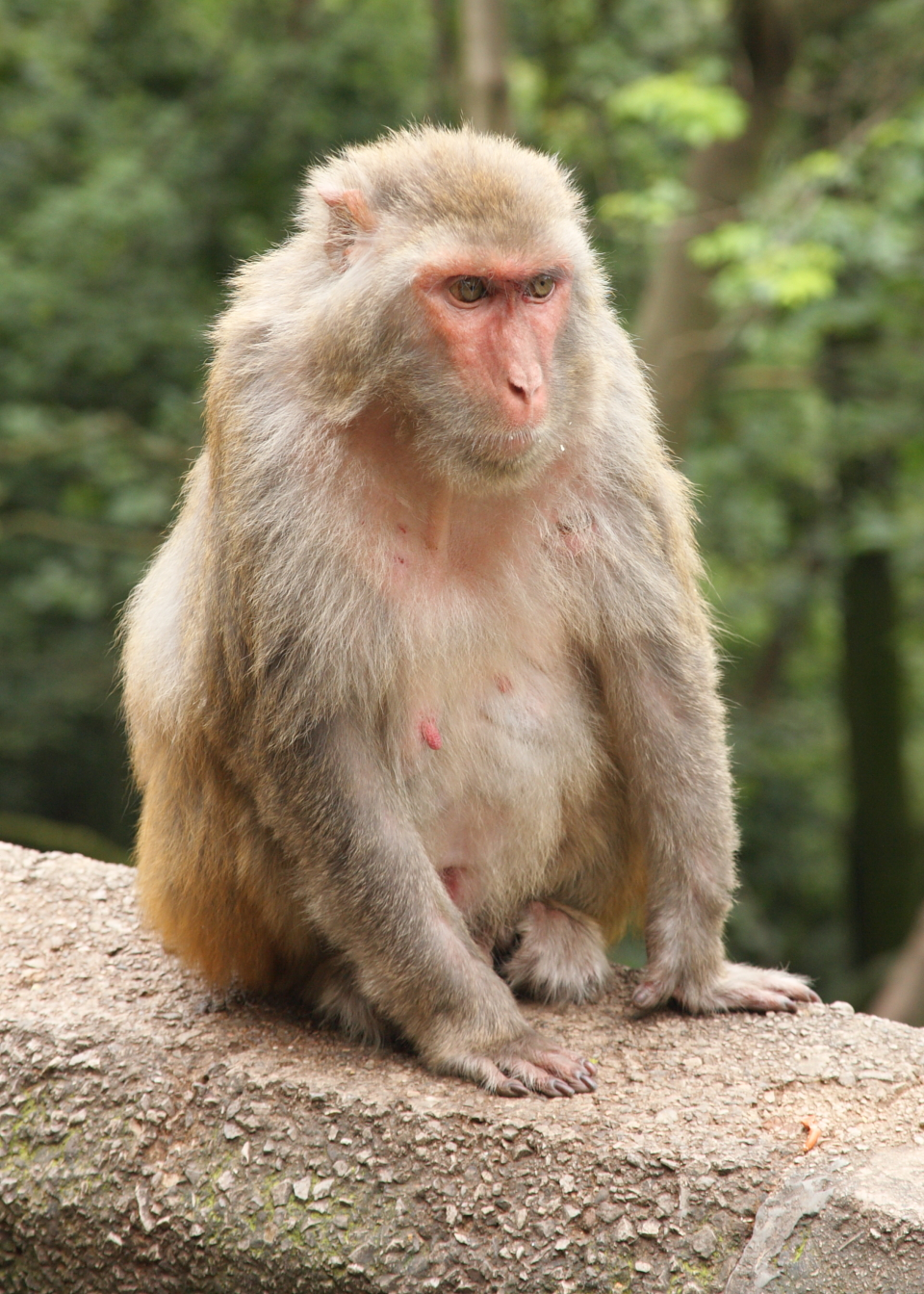
Rhesus macaque

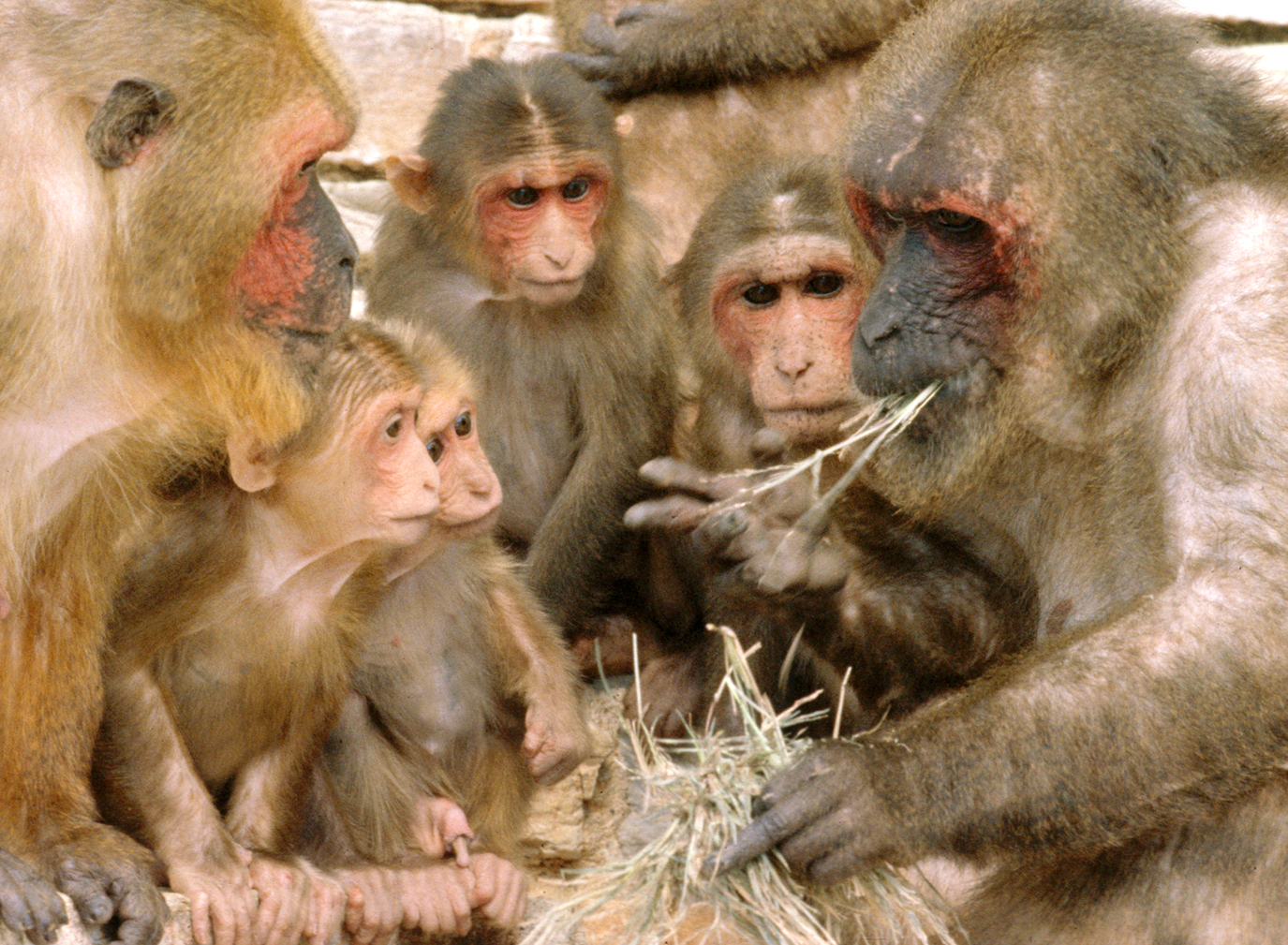
An alpha male stump-tailed macaque eats as other members of his troop watch

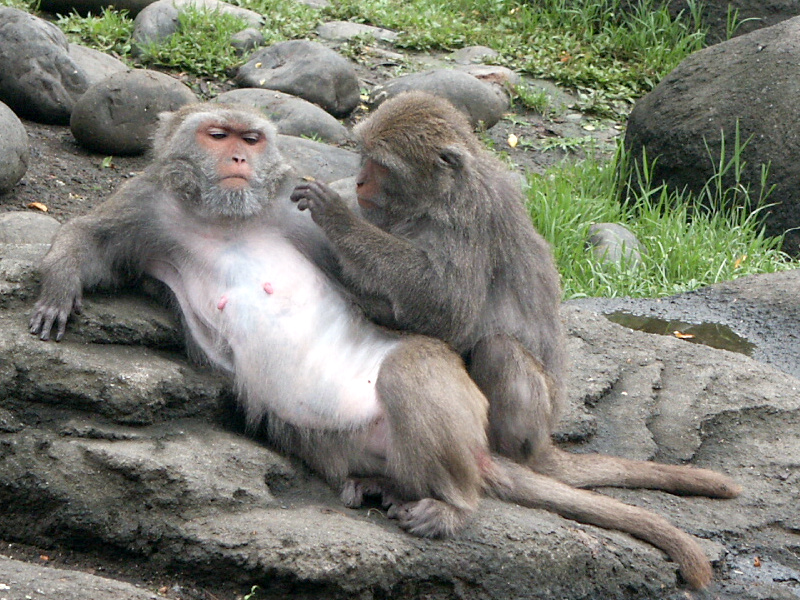
Formosan rock macaques

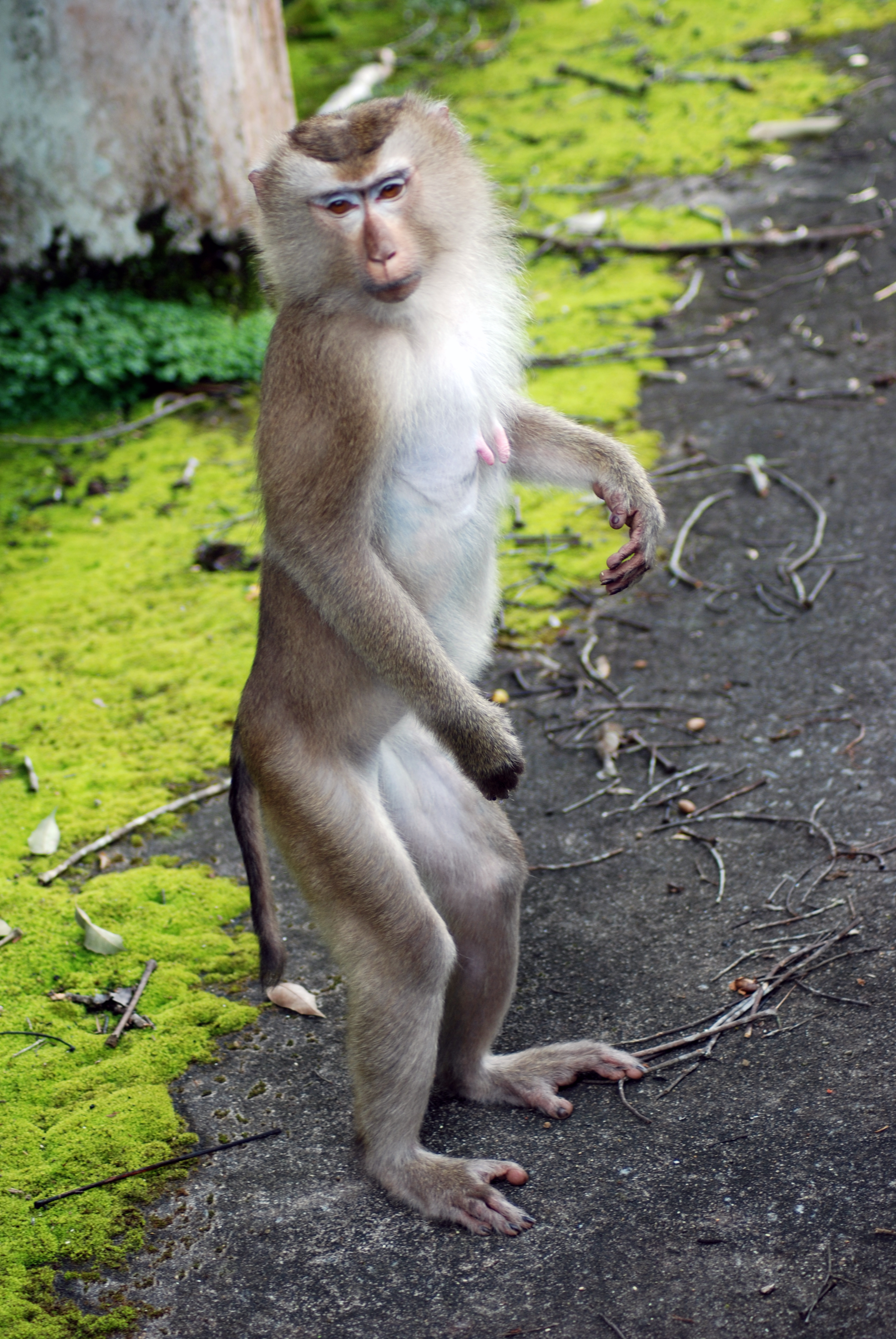
Northern pig-tailed macaque

The most commonly found primates in China are macaques, which have oversized cheeks to store food and live in large troops. The range of the rhesus or common macaque extends from as far north as the Taihang Mountains of Shanxi and down to Hainan. Tibetan macaques are often seen at tourist sites such as Mount Emei and Huangshan. Stump-tailed macaques have distinct red faces and live throughout southern China. The Formosan rock macaque is endemic to Taiwan. Assam macaques are found in higher elevation areas of southern Tibet and the Southwest, and the northern pig-tailed macaque in Yunnan. Macaques are Class I protected species in China but their numbers have fallen sharply. Monkey brain is a delicacy in parts of Guangxi and Guangdong, and macaques are often hunted for food. The Monpa and Lhoba people of southern Tibet eat Assam macaques. From 1998 to 2004, the number of rhesus macaques in China fell from 254,000 to about 77,000. Over the same period, the Tibetan macaque population fell by 83% from about 100,000 to only about 17,000.

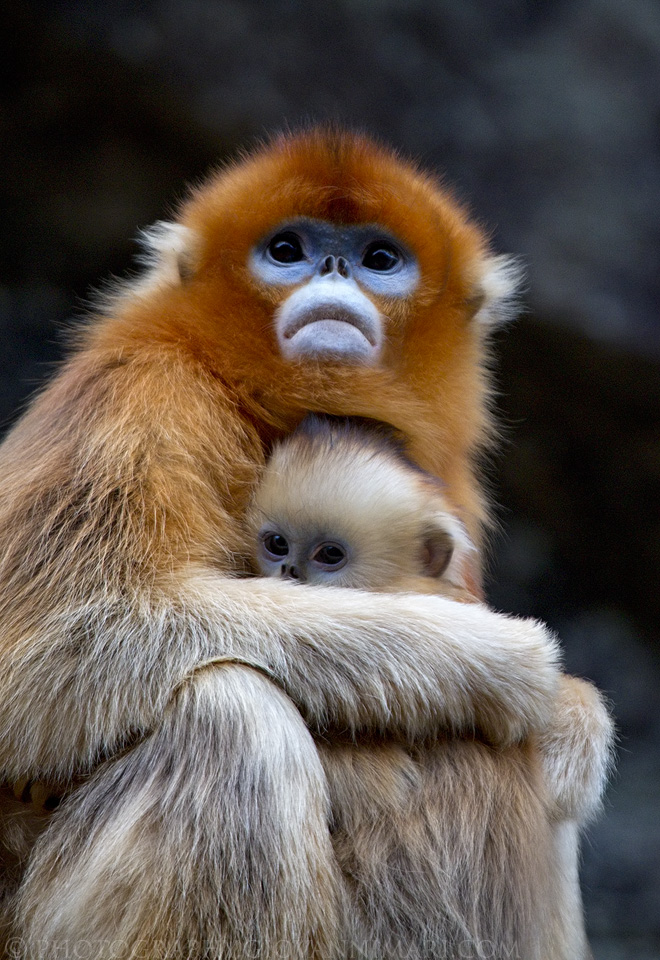
Golden snub-nosed monkeys

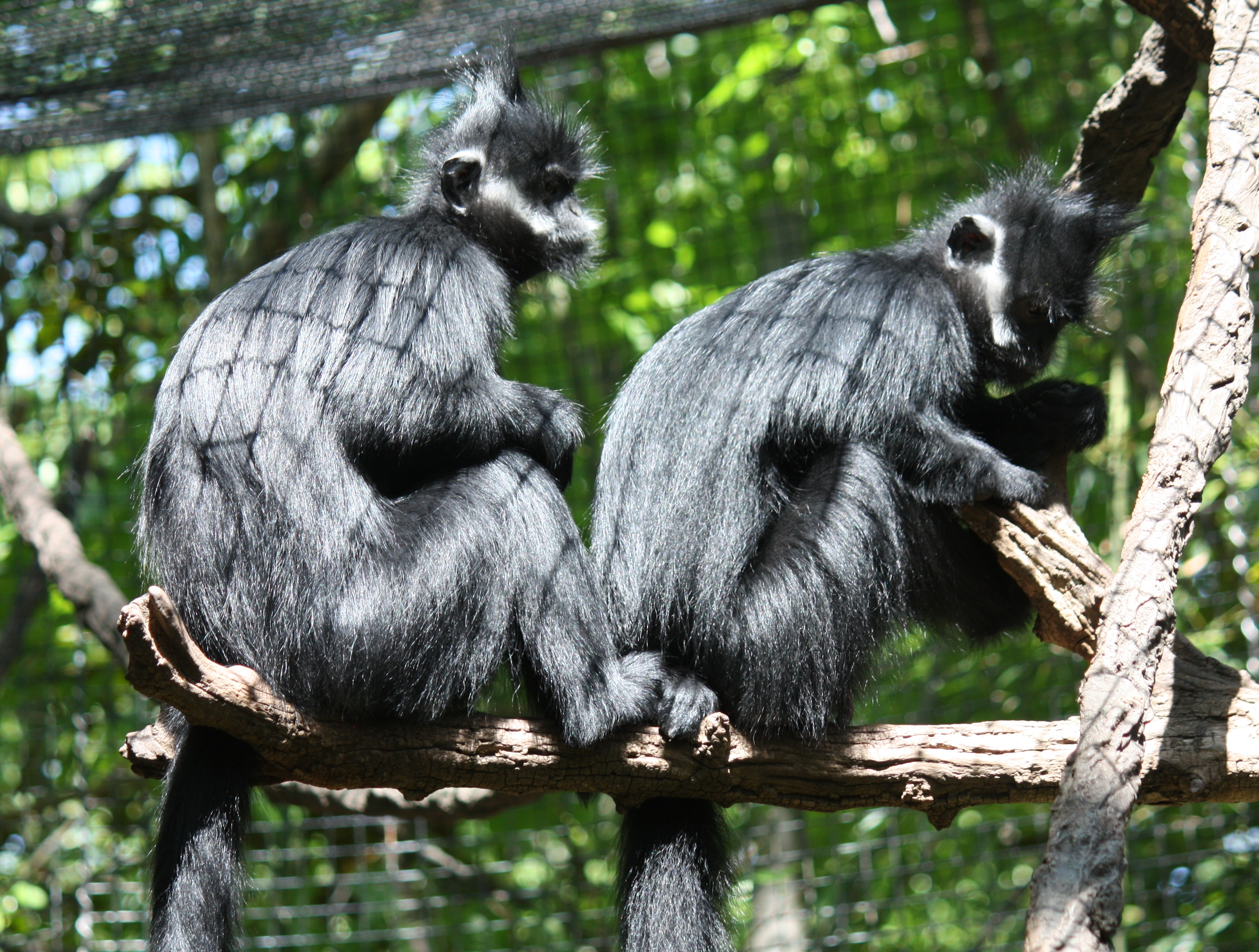
François' langurs

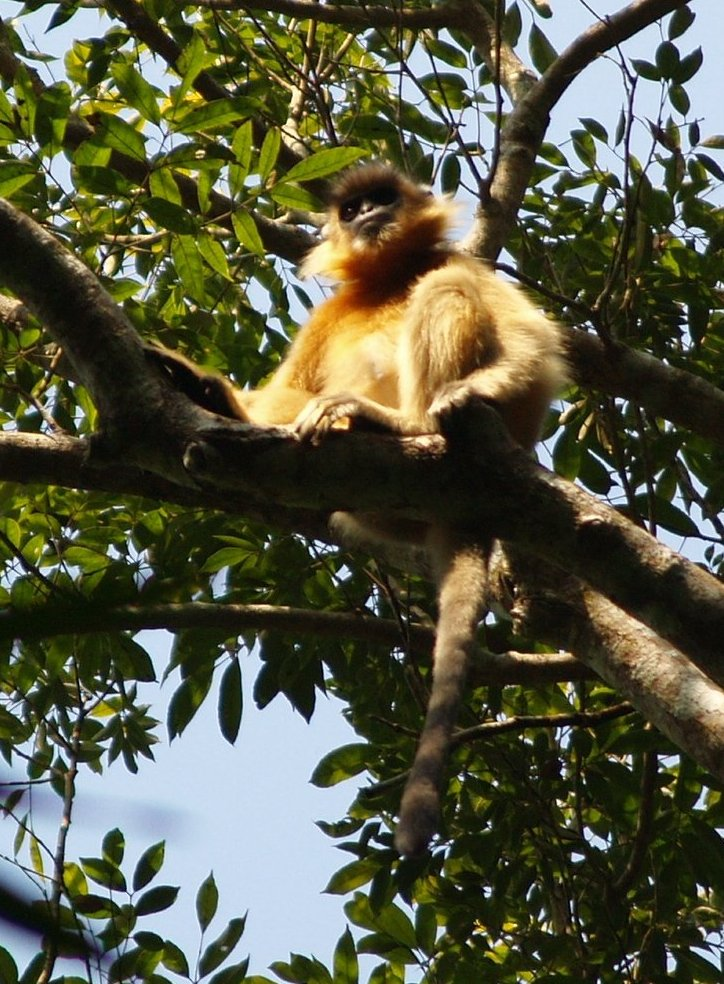
Capped langur

Snub-nosed monkeys are so named because they have only nostrils and virtually no nose. Four of the five species in the world are found in China, including three that are endemic. All live in mountainous forests at elevations of 1,500–3,400 m above sea level. The golden snub-nosed monkey is most famous and most widely distributed, with subspecies in Sichuan, Hubei and Shaanxi. The gray snub-nosed monkey is the most endangered, with about 700 individuals, found only in Guizhou. The black snub-nosed monkey has about 1,700 individuals living in 17 identified groups in Yunnan and eastern Tibet. A small population of Myanmar snub-nosed monkey was found in western Yunnan in 2011.

Other Old World monkeys in China include the François' langur, white-headed langur, Phayre's leaf monkey, capped langur and Shortridge's langur, which are collectively categorized as lutungs and the Nepal gray langur, which is considered a true langur. All of these species are endangered. Lutungs, also called leaf monkeys, have relatively short arms, longer legs and long tails along with a hood of hair above their eyes.

François' langur is found only in southwest China and northern Vietnam. The range of the white-headed langur is much smaller—only in southern Guangxi and Cát Bà Island in Vietnam. Phayre's leaf monkey is native to Yunnan and a larger swath of Indochina. The capped and Shortridge's langurs live along the Yunnan-Myanmar border. The Nepal gray langur is larger than the lutungs and found in southern Tibet.

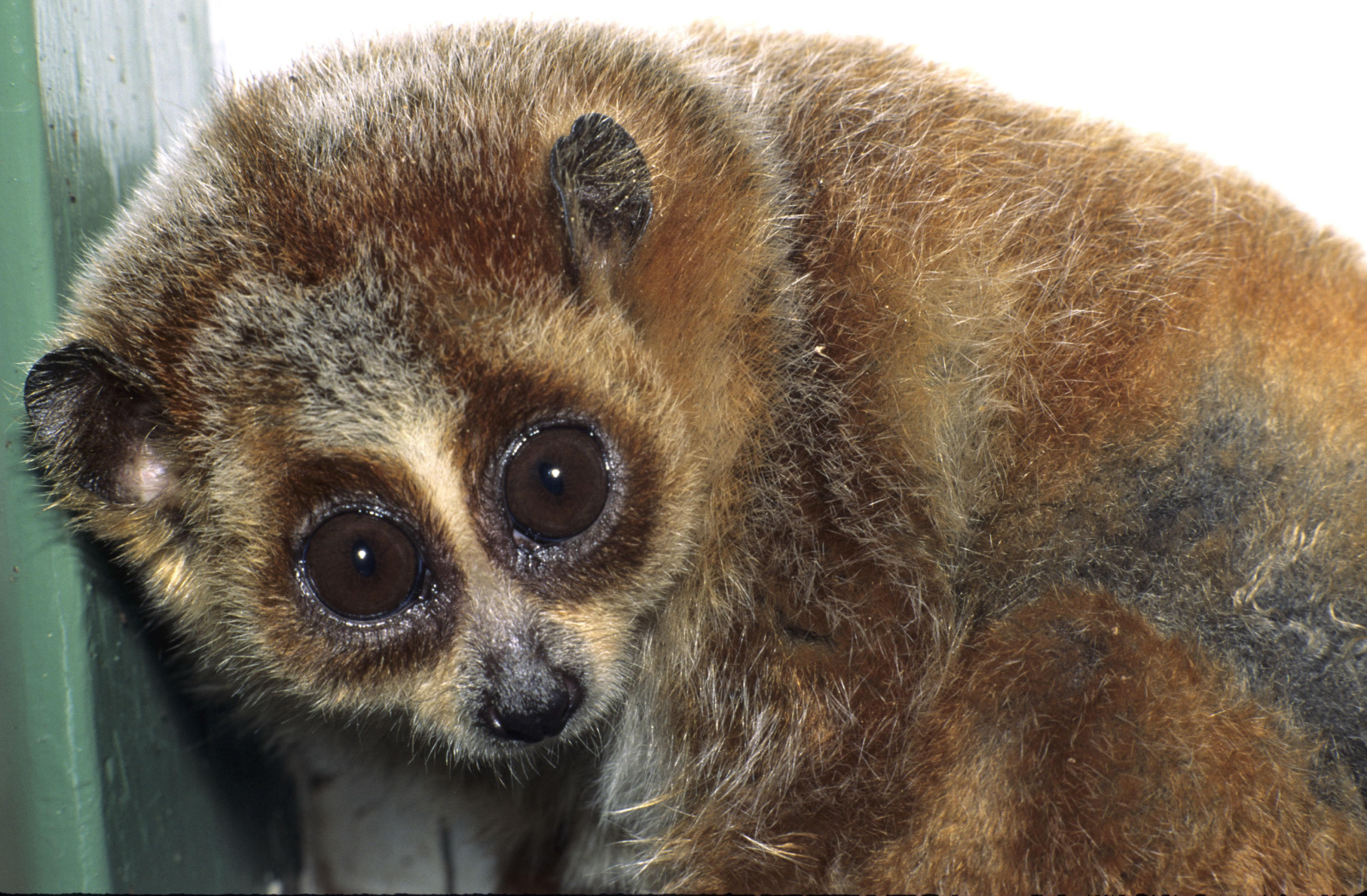
Pygmy slow loris

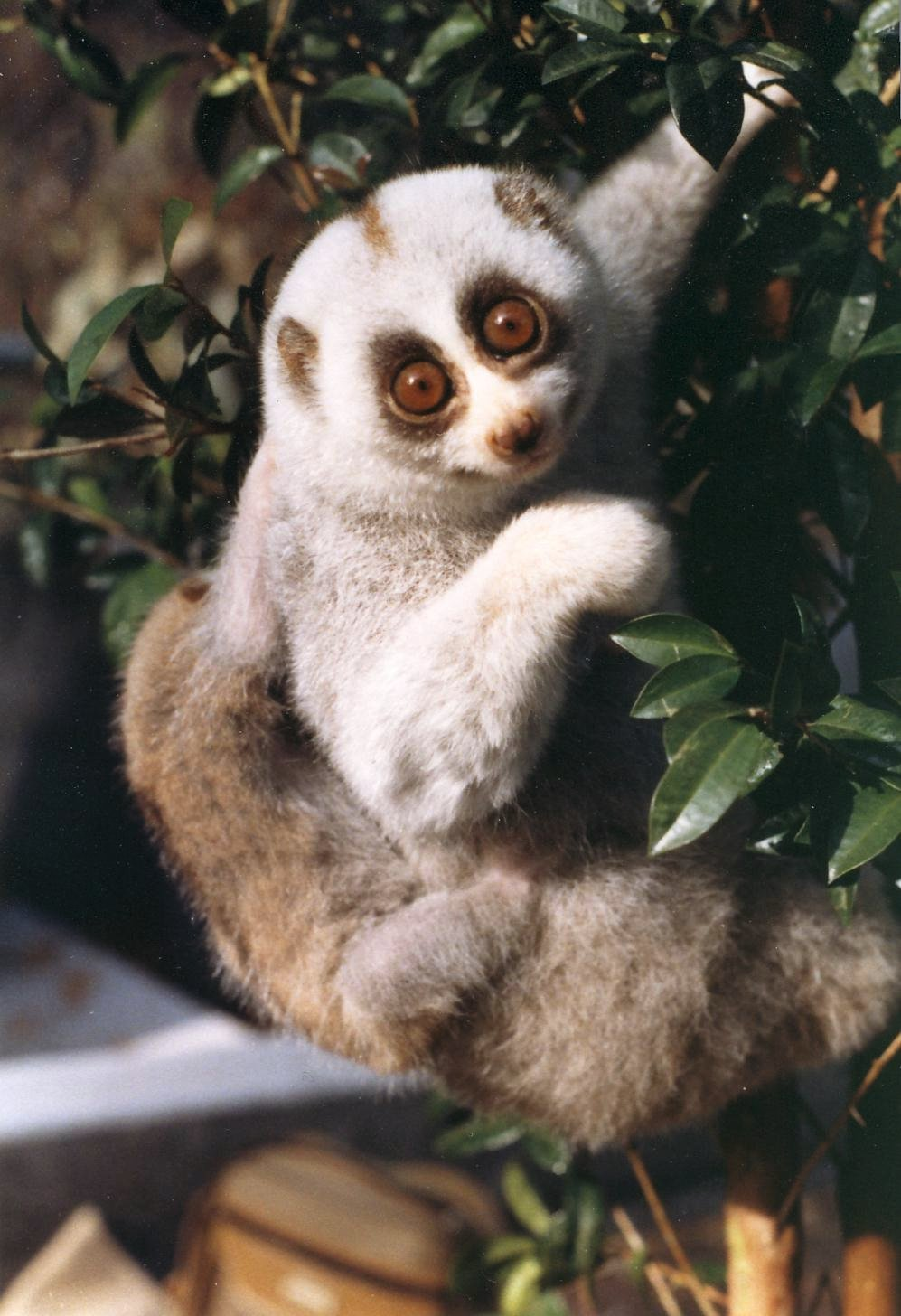
Bengal slow loris

Whereas apes and monkeys are grouped as haplorhine or "dry nose" primates, lorises are strepsirrhine or "wet nose" primates. Lorises have big eyes and tiny ears, live in trees and are active at night. The pygmy slow loris and Bengal slow loris are both found in southern Yunnan and Guangxi and are Class I protected species.

=== Carnivores ===
==== Cats ====
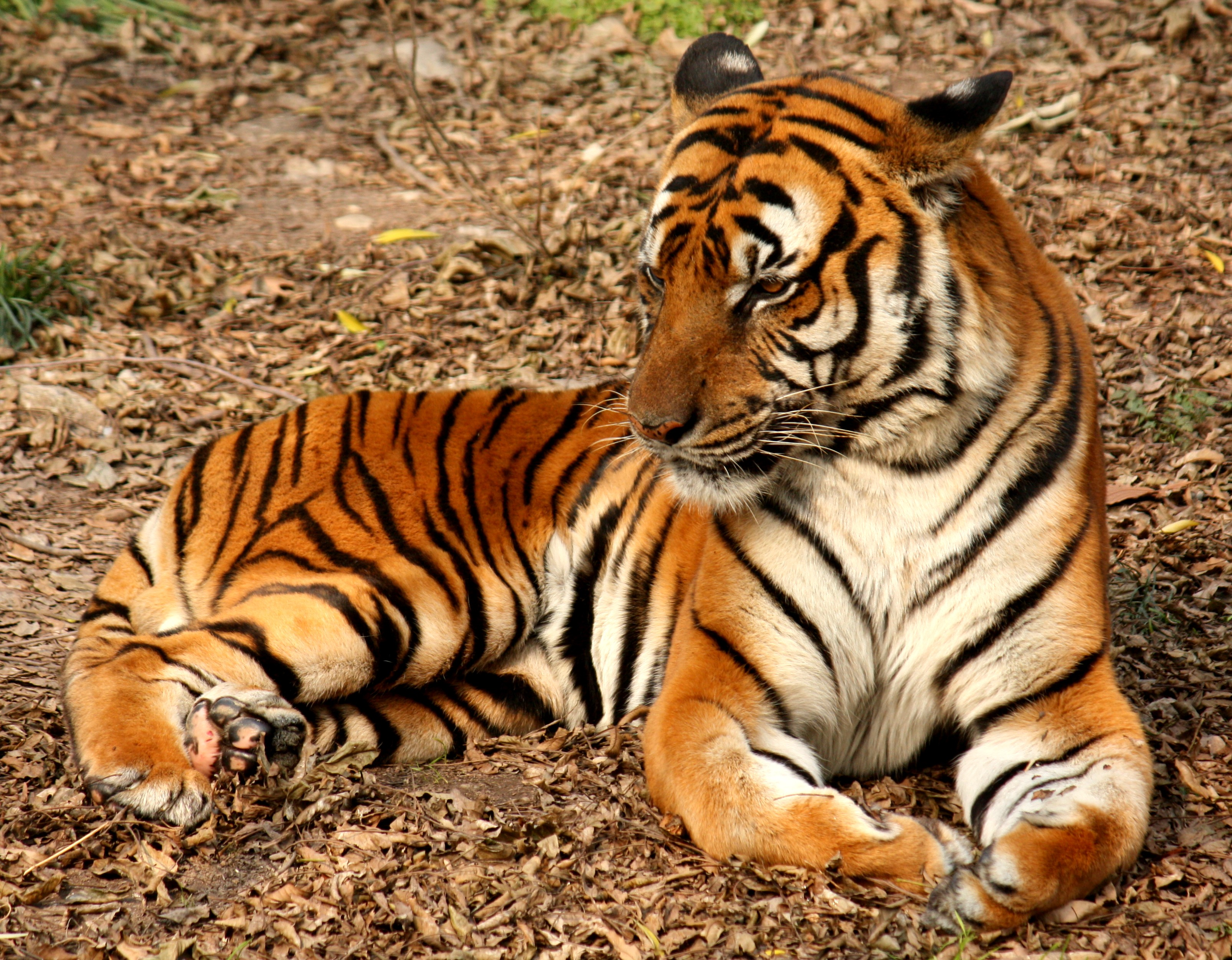
A South China tiger at the Shanghai Zoo

China's big cat species include the tiger, leopard, snow leopard and clouded leopard. The tiger is one of the 12 animals of the Chinese zodiac, and figures prominently in Chinese culture and history. Tiger bones are used in traditional Chinese medicine and tiger fur is used for decoration. The animal is vulnerable to poaching and habitat loss. Four tiger populations were native to China. All are critically endangered, protected and live in nature reserves.

The Siberian tiger occurs in the Northeast, along the border with Russia and North Korea. The Caspian tiger was last seen in the Manasi River Basin of the Xinjiang Uyghur Autonomous Region in the 1960s, where this population is now extinct. The South China tiger is an endemic population whose habitat is now confined to the mountain regions of Jiangxi, Hunan, Guangdong and Fujian. A few Indochinese tigers were known to live in Yunnan where six nature reserves have been established for their protection.

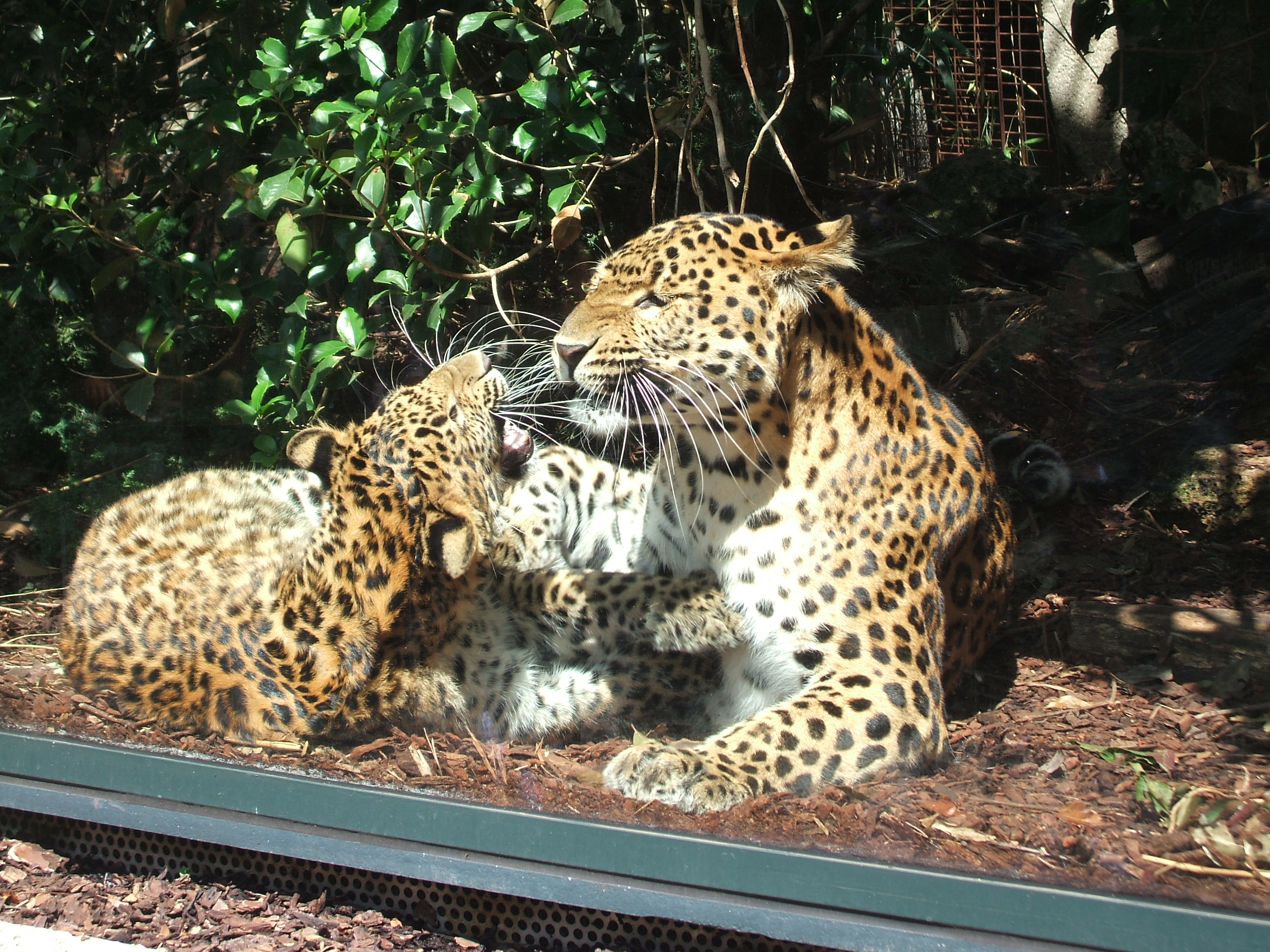
Amur leopards

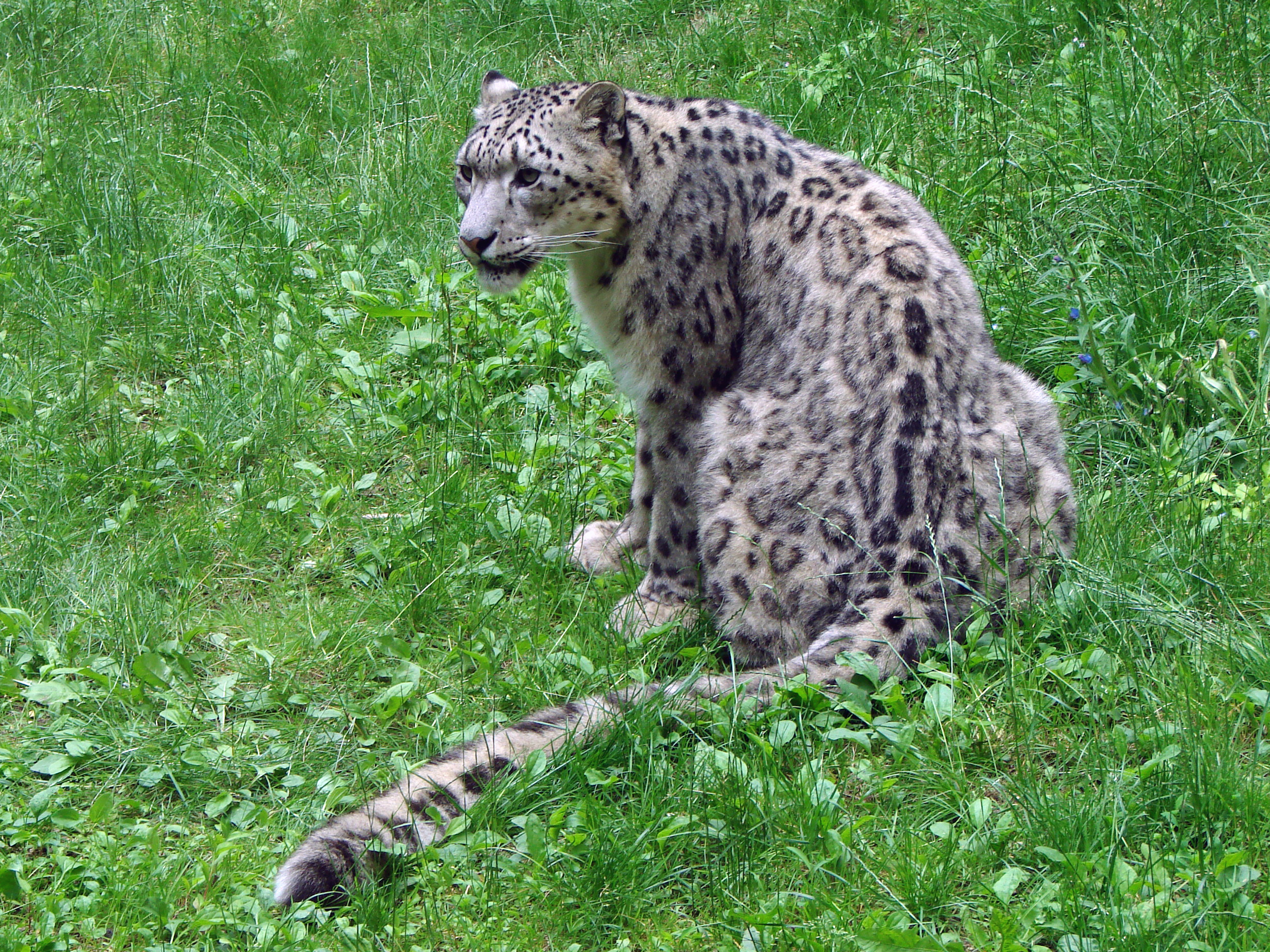
Snow leopard

Three leopard subspecies are thought to occur in China:

- Leopards recorded in Qomolangma National Nature Preserve in southern Tibet are subsumed to the Indian leopard.
- The Indochinese leopard occurs in Yunnan Province of southern China, where the Pearl River is thought to form a barrier to leopard populations farther north. Camera-trap surveys conducted between 2002 and 2009 in 11 nature reserves in southern China recorded leopards only in Changqing National Nature Reserve in the Qinling Mountains, but not in Sichuan's Wolong Nature Reserve and other protected areas in Sichuan.
- The Amur leopard is native to northern China including the Jilin province along the border with Russia and North Korea, where it has been recorded by camera-traps in Hunchun National Nature Reserve. Leopards cross between China, Russia and North Korea across the Tumen River despite a high and long wire fence marking the international boundary. Contemporary records of leopards exist from protected areas in Hebei, Henan and Shanxi Provinces, and Ningxia Autonomous Region, but not from Gansu Province. Whether leopards still occur in Qinghai Province is uncertain. The species has probably been extirpated in Hunan, Hubei, Zhejiang, Fujian, Guangxi and Jiangxi provinces. It is listed as nationally critically endangered, but receives little attention from Chinese wildlife biologists and conservationists. Fragmented leopard populations in central China have been subsumed to the Amur leopard, as there is no notable geographical barrier to northern China that would have prevented gene flow in the past.

The range of the snow leopard extends across the Himalayas, Tibetan Plateau, Karakorum Mountains, and Tian Shan in western China.

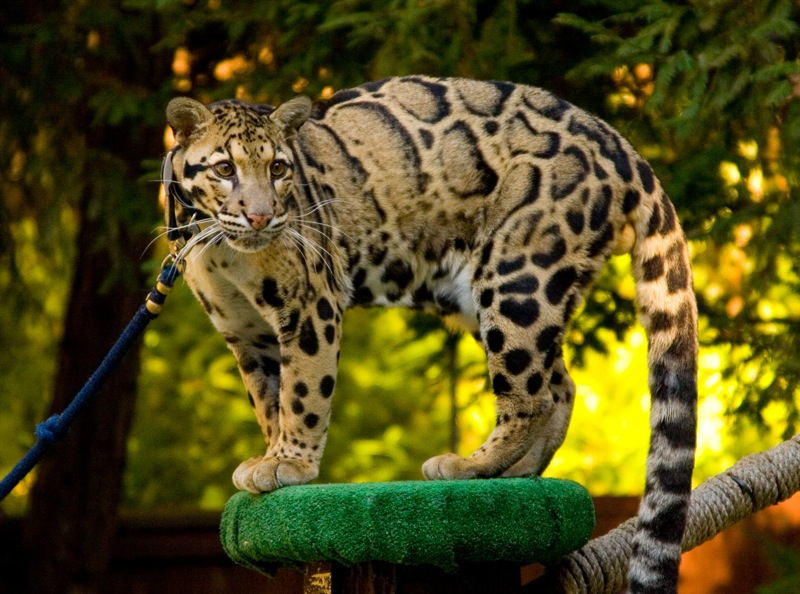
Clouded leopard

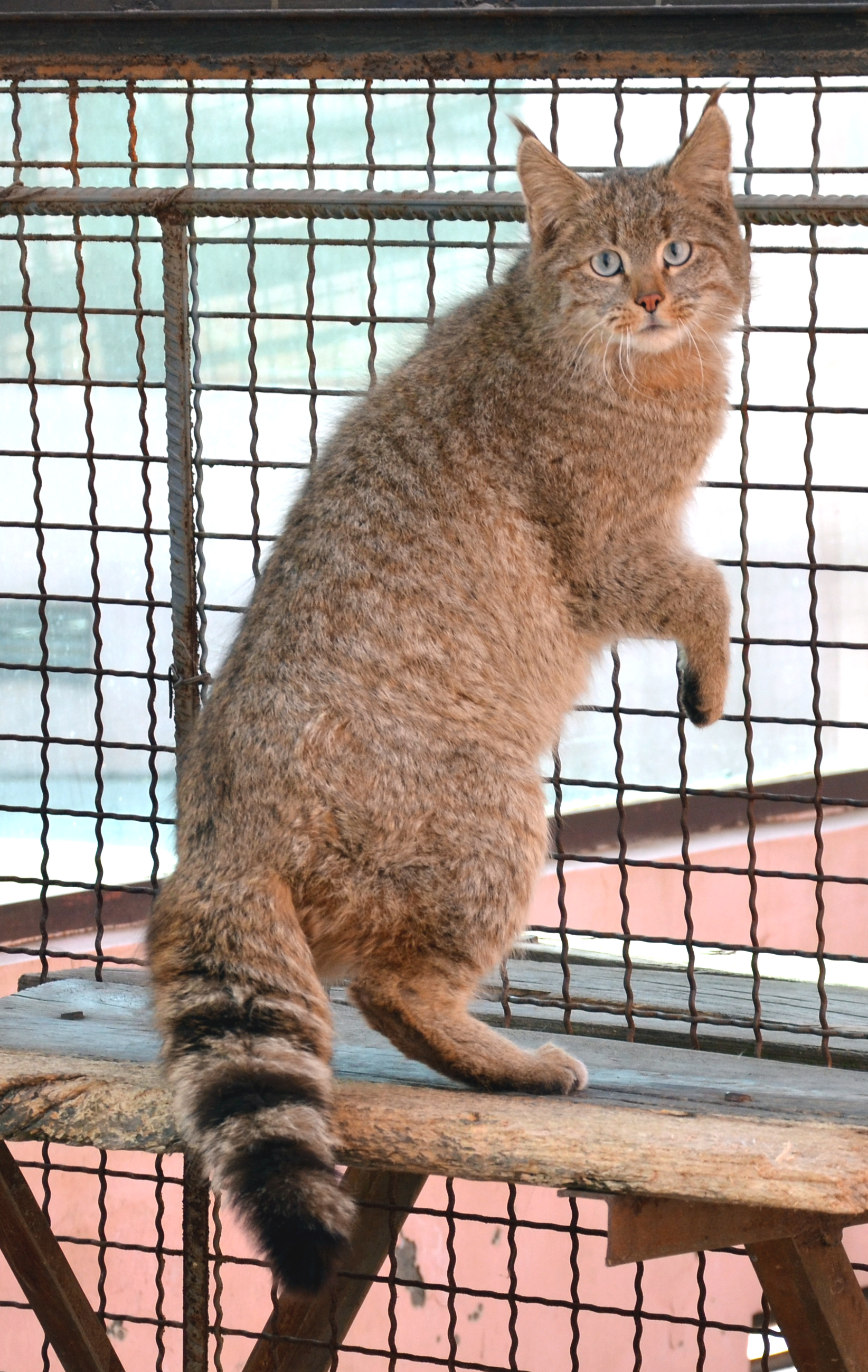
Chinese mountain cat

The clouded leopard occurs in forest regions south of the Yangtze River. It became locally extinct in Taiwan in 1972.

The Chinese mountain cat is endemic to China and lives on the north-eastern edge of the Tibetan Plateau. It was recorded only in eastern Qinghai and north-western Sichuan. It was photographed by a camera-trap for the first time in 2007. One individual was observed and photographed in May 2015 in the Ruoergai grasslands.

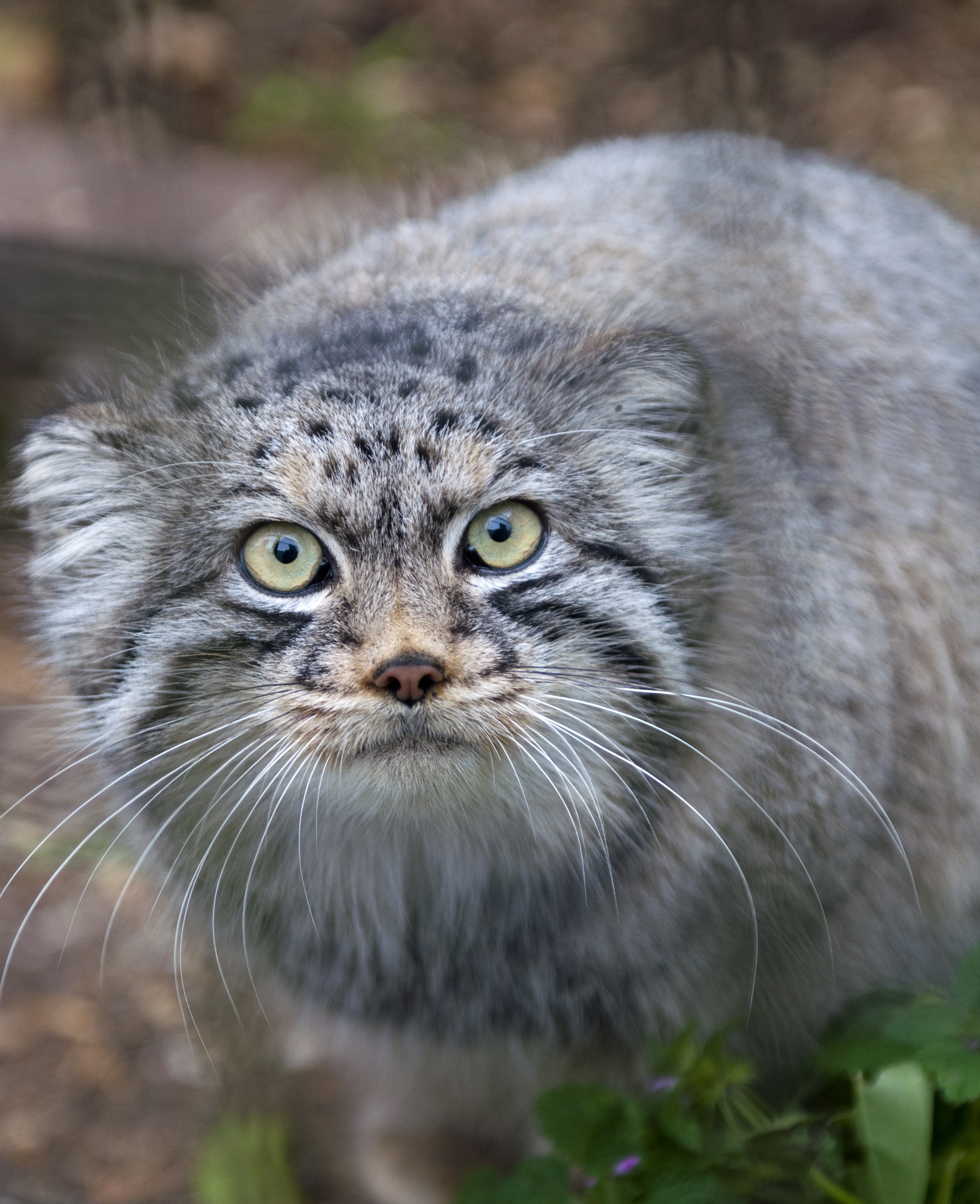
Pallas's cat

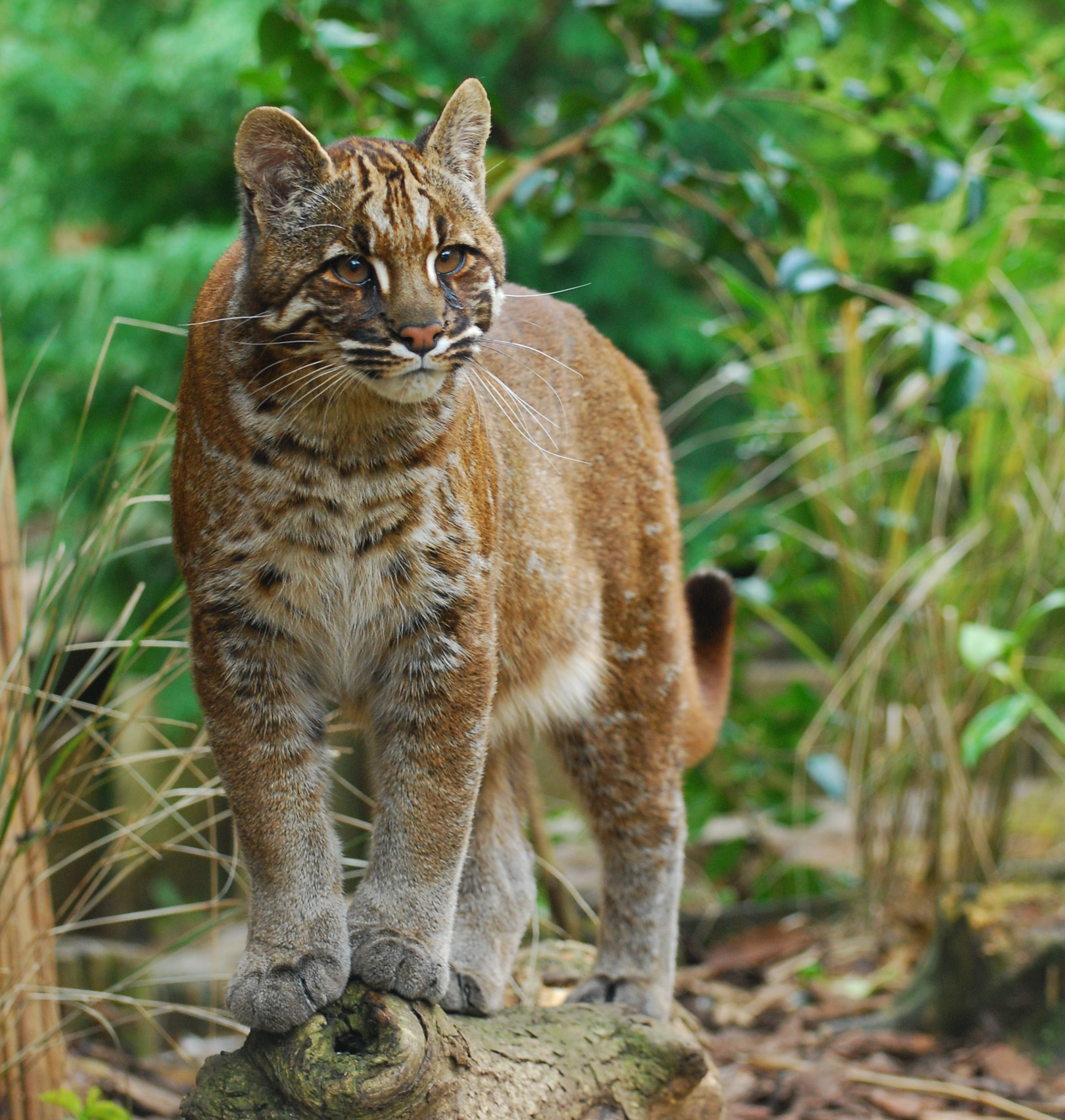
Asian golden cat

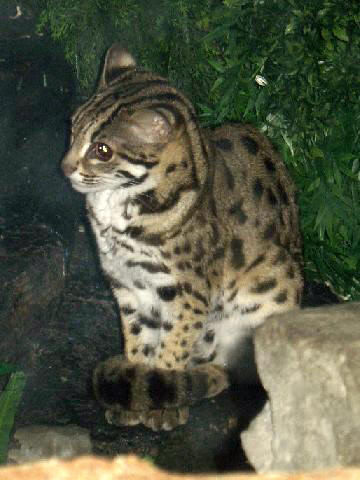
Leopard cat

The range of the Eurasian lynx includes the Greater Khingan Mountains of Northeast China. Pallas's cat occurs at high altitudes on the Tibetan Plateau and in western China.

The Asiatic wildcat is distributed in Xinjiang, Qinghai, Gansu, Ningxia, Shaanxi, and Inner Mongolia. Within Xinjiang, it has been confined to three southern prefectures: Bayingolin Mongol Autonomous Prefecture, Aksu and Hotan. It is declining rapidly in its natural habitat in the Xinjiang desert region of China mainly because of excessive hunting for pelt trade followed by shrinkage of its habitat due to cultivation, oil and gas exploration and excessive use of pesticides.

The Asian golden cat and leopard cat have been recorded in the Changqing National Nature Reserve in the Qinling Mountains and in the Tangjiahe National Nature Reserve in the Min Mountains. The leopard cat also occurs in the Wolong Nature Reserve and other protected areas in the Qionglai Mountains and Daliang Mountains.

==== Canines ====
The family Canidae has many members in China including the dog, wolf, dhole, red fox, corsac fox, Tibetan sand fox and common raccoon dog. Two subspecies of wolf live in China—the Eurasian wolf, which is found in all of mainland China and the Tibetan wolf, which lives on the Tibetan Plateau.

Some of the earliest dogs may have been domesticated in East Asia, and several Chinese dog breeds including the shar-pei and chow chow are among the most ancient in terms of DNA similarity to the gray wolf.

Dholes are now found in only five provinces: Gansu, Yunnan, Tibet, Sichuan, and Xinjiang.

The red fox, the largest fox species, can be found in every part of China except the northwest. The corsac fox is found in Northeast China and the Tibetan sand fox in Tibet, Qinghai, Sichuan, Gansu and Yunnan.

The raccoon dog, one of the few canids that can climb trees, is native to eastern and northeastern China.

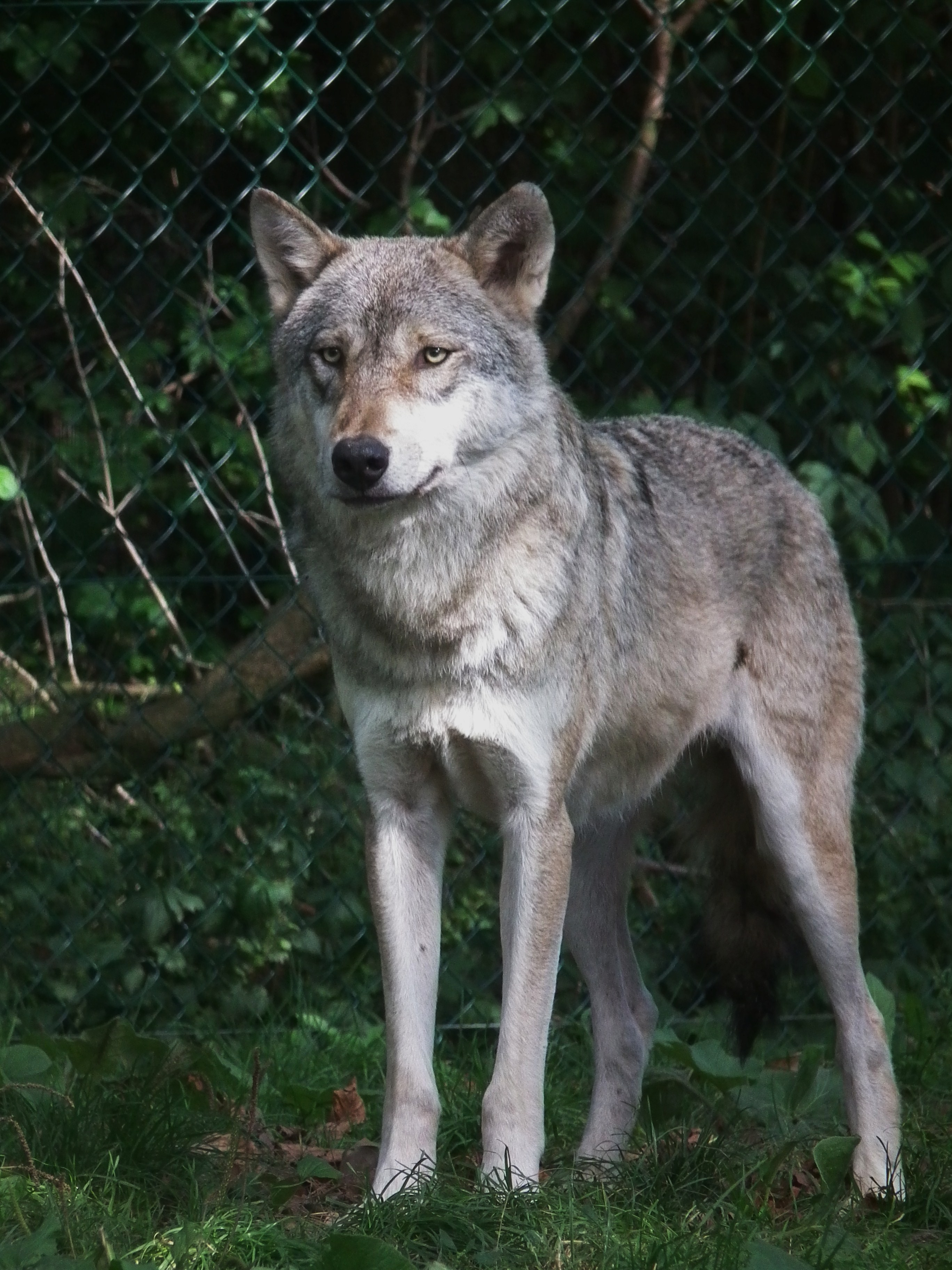
Eurasian wolf

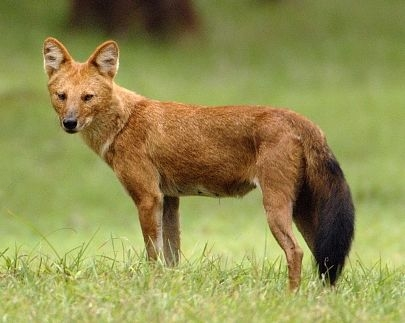
Dhole

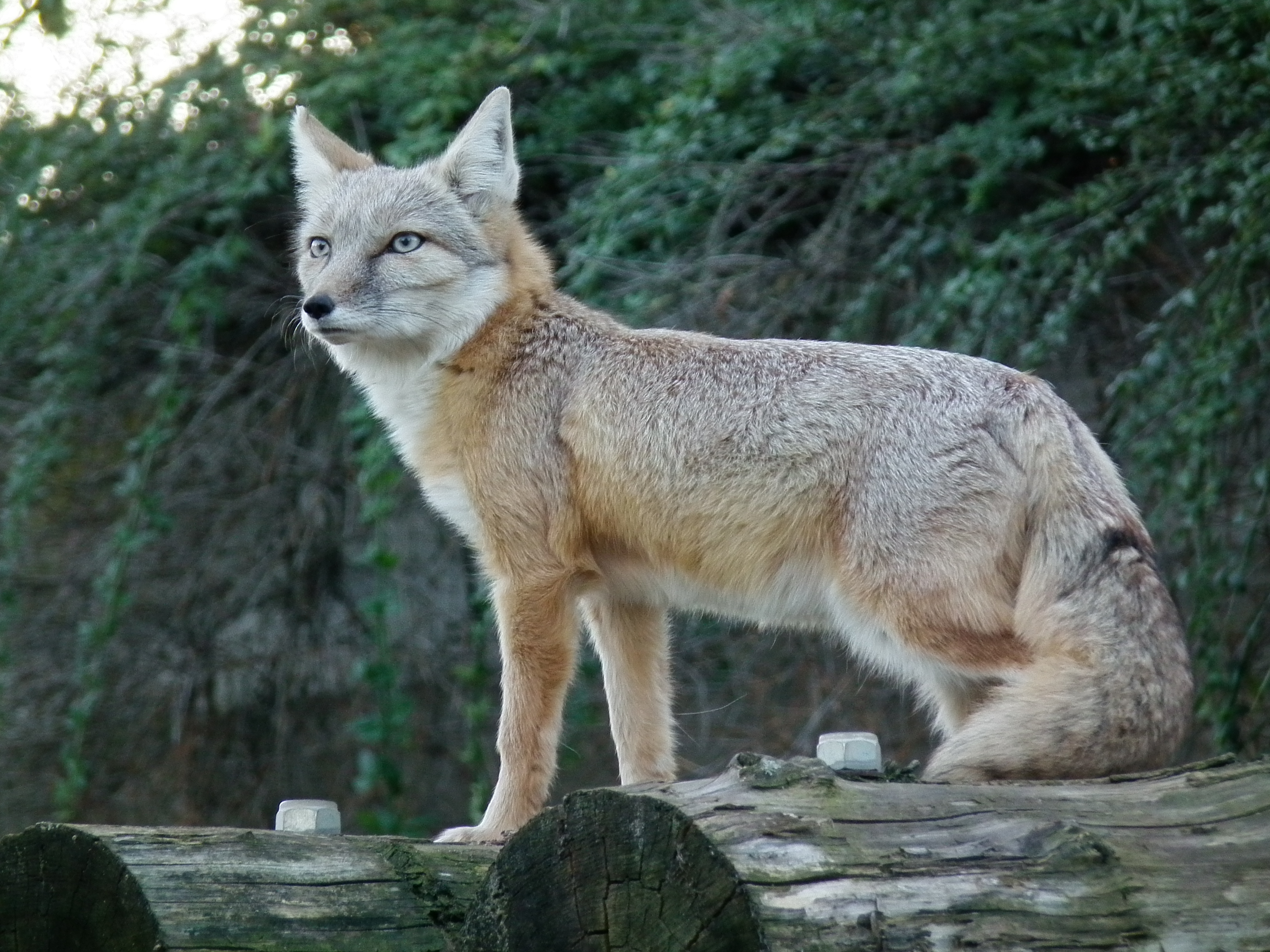
Corsac fox

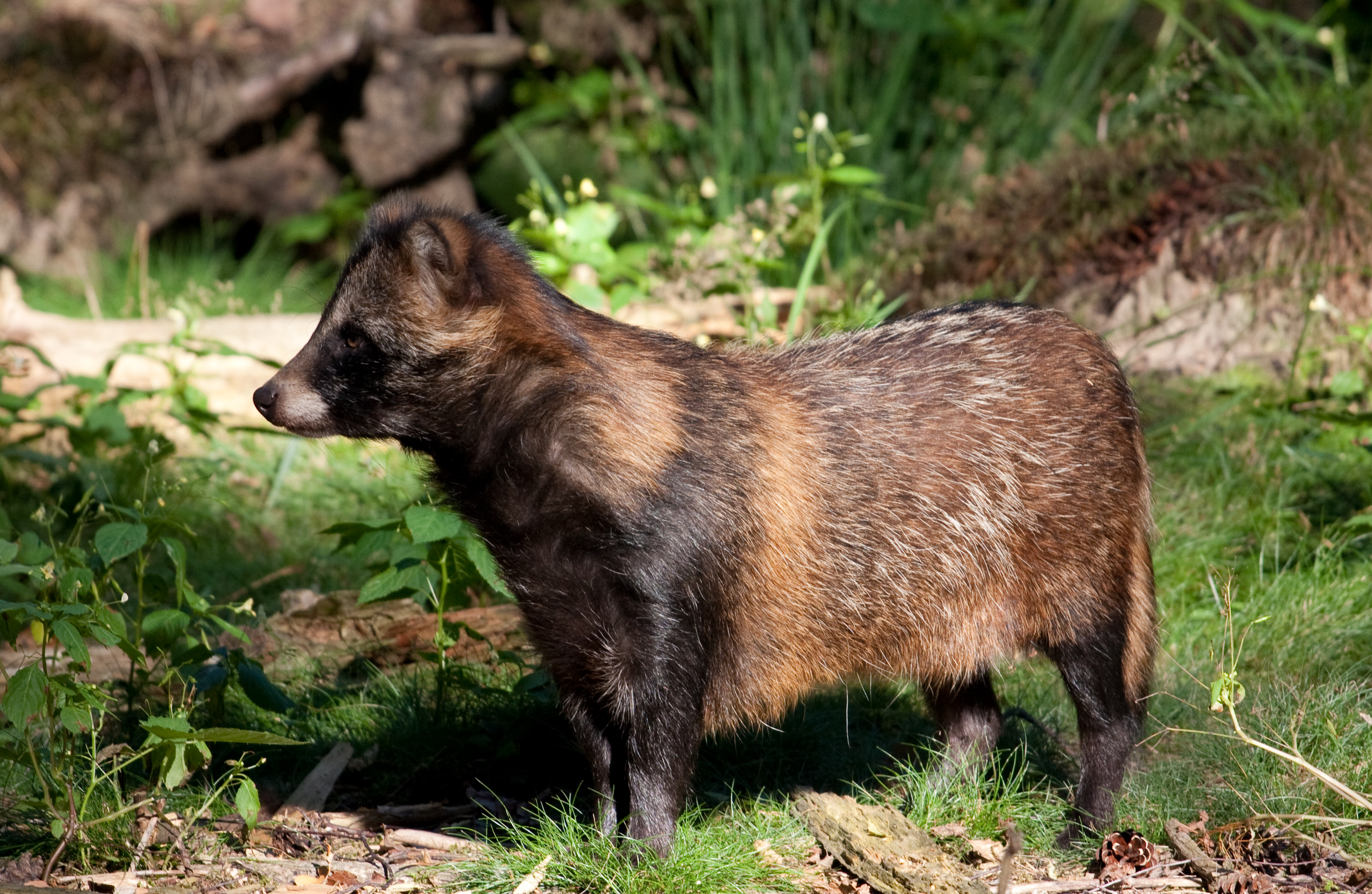
Raccoon dog

==== Pandas, bears ====
The giant panda, perhaps China's most famous wildlife species, lives in six patches of highland valleys of the Min, Qionglai, Liang, Daxiangling, Xiaoxiangling and Qinling mountains of the upper Yangtze River basin, which are spread over 45 counties in Sichuan, Gansu and Shaanxi. Only about 1,600 live in the wild (80% in Sichuan) along with about 300 in captivity in Chinese breeding centers and zoos. The animal is rare and elusive. Though classified as an omnivore, the giant panda's diet is over 90% bamboo. Its black and white coloration provides a degree camouflage in the dense forests, but the adult animal has no natural predators. Giant pandas are notoriously difficult to breed; they have short mating periods, and give birth to only one or two cubs per year. The giant panda cub is the smallest baby, compared in proportion to the parents, of any placental mammal. The giant panda is considered to be a national treasure and is an endangered species protected by state law. Since the 1970s, giant pandas have been given or lent to foreign zoos as gesture of diplomatic goodwill.

Other more common bears in China include the Asiatic black bear and the brown bear which are found across much of the country. Sub-species of the brown bear include the Himalayan brown bear and the Tibetan blue bear in Tibet, and the Ussuri brown bear in Northeast China. The sun bear is found in Yunnan. Bears, especially black bears, are also raised in captivity to harvest their bile for use in traditional Chinese medicine.

The red panda - which unlike the giant panda is not a bear and more closely resembles a raccoon - is from a separate family by itself (Ailuridae), and is found in Sichuan and Yunnan.

==== Viverridae and Herpestidae ====
The viverrid and mongoose families of small carnivores are represented by numerous members occurring in southern China, including binturong, large Indian civet, small Indian civet, Owston's palm civet, masked palm civet, Asian palm civet, small-toothed palm civet, crab-eating mongoose and small Indian mongoose.

==== Otter, badger, weasel, marten, wolverine ====
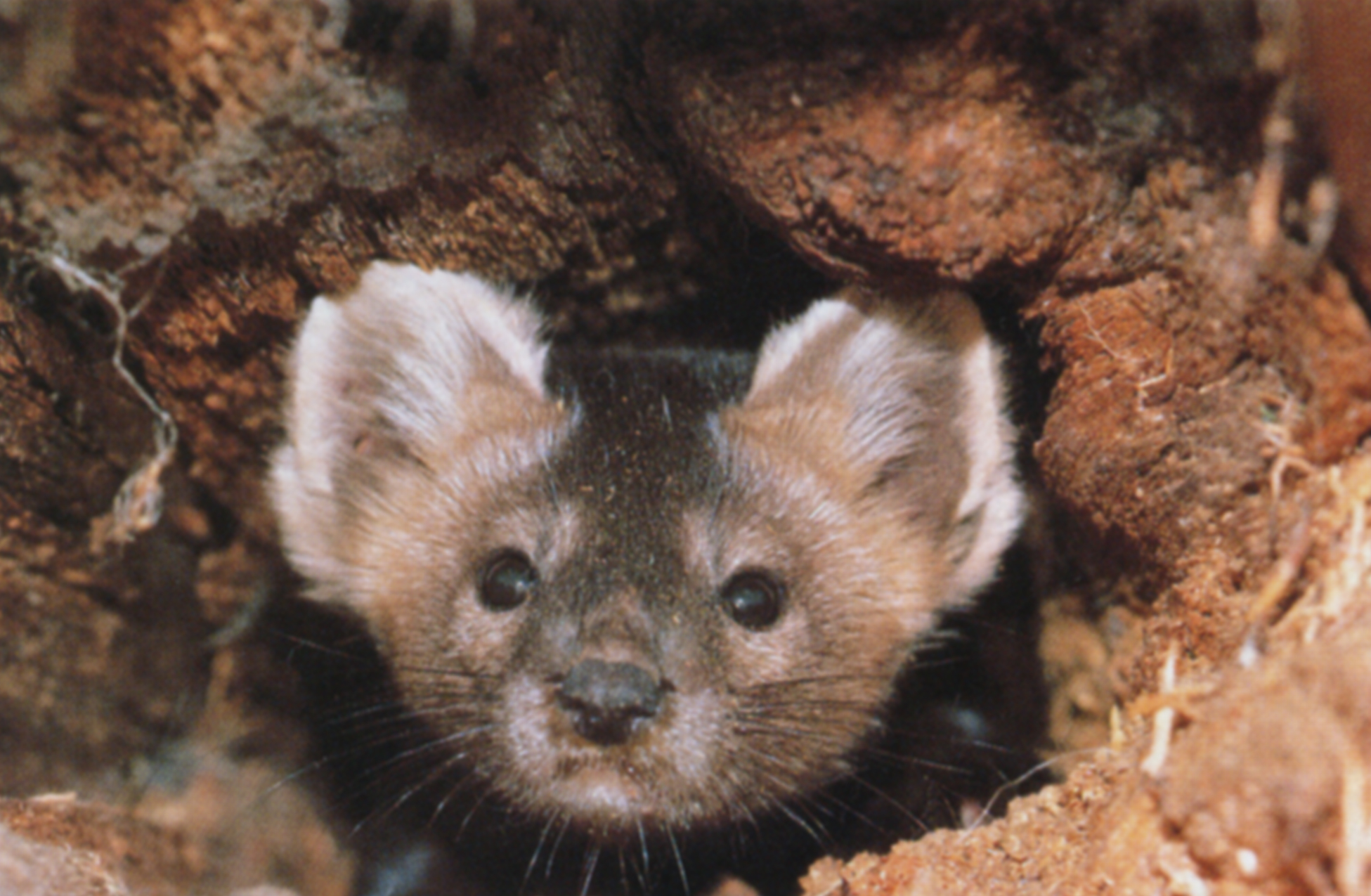
Sable

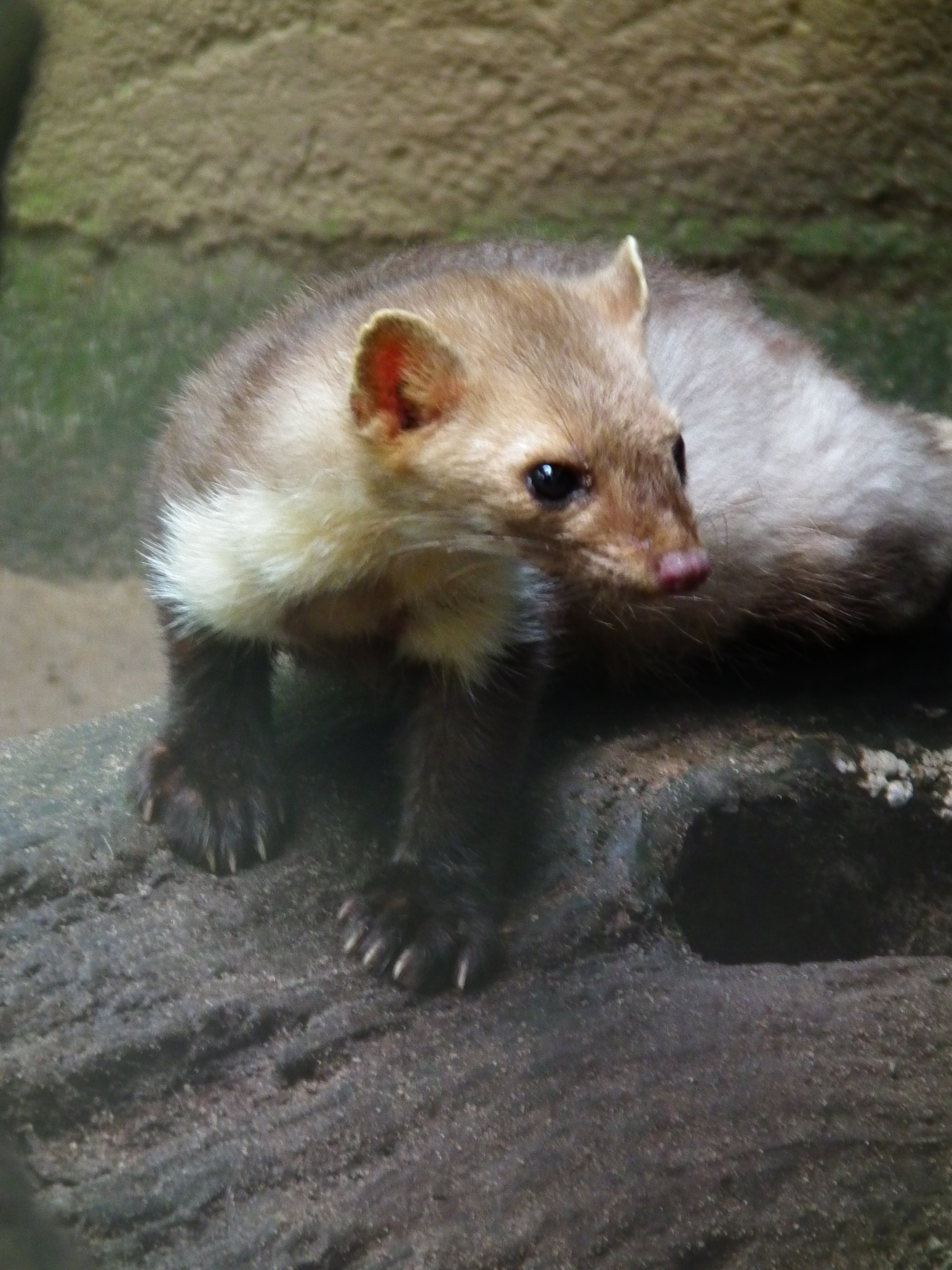
Beech marten

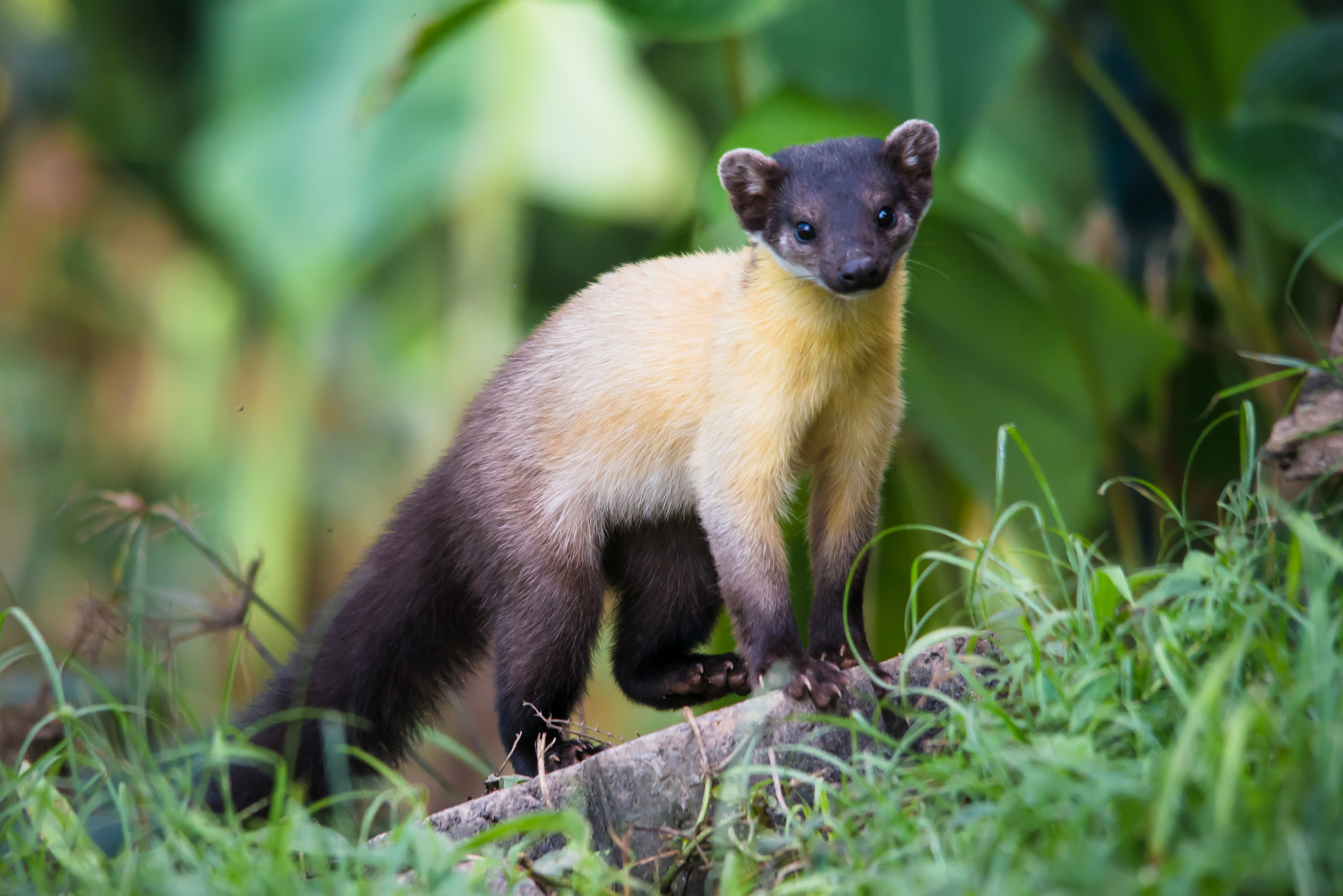
Yellow-throated marten

The largest family of carnivorous mammals belongs to the otters, badgers, weasels, martens, and wolverines, all of which are found in China. All of these mustelids are short, furry animals with short, rounded ears and thick fur, but they differ markedly in size, habit and habitat.

The sable, a species of marten, is prized for its fine fur, which along with ginseng and deer antler velvet, are known as the "three treasures of Manchuria". The sable is found in Manchuria (also called the Northeast) and Altai region of northern Xinjiang. The beech marten of western China and yellow-throated marten of southern China are closely related to the sable.

The Siberian weasel, known locally as the "yellow rat wolf", is the most common weasel in China. It is found throughout China proper and Manchuria, and known to steal poultry from farmers but helps to control the rodent population. Hair from the tail of the Siberian weasel is used to make ink brush for traditional Chinese calligraphy. Other weasel species include the least weasel and stoat in the north, yellow-bellied weasel and back-striped weasel in the south, and mountain weasel in the west. The steppe polecat is bigger than the Siberian weasel and found across northern China.

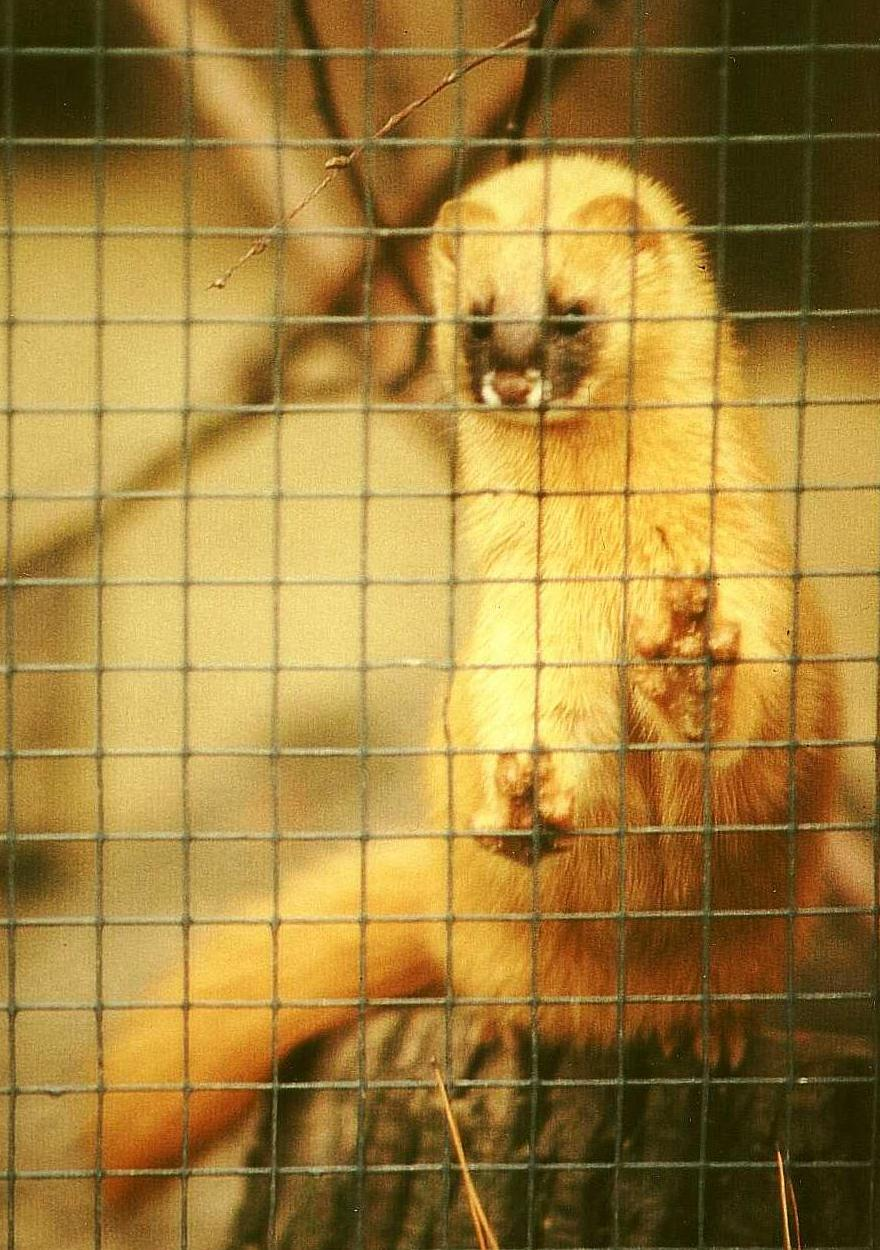
Siberian weasel

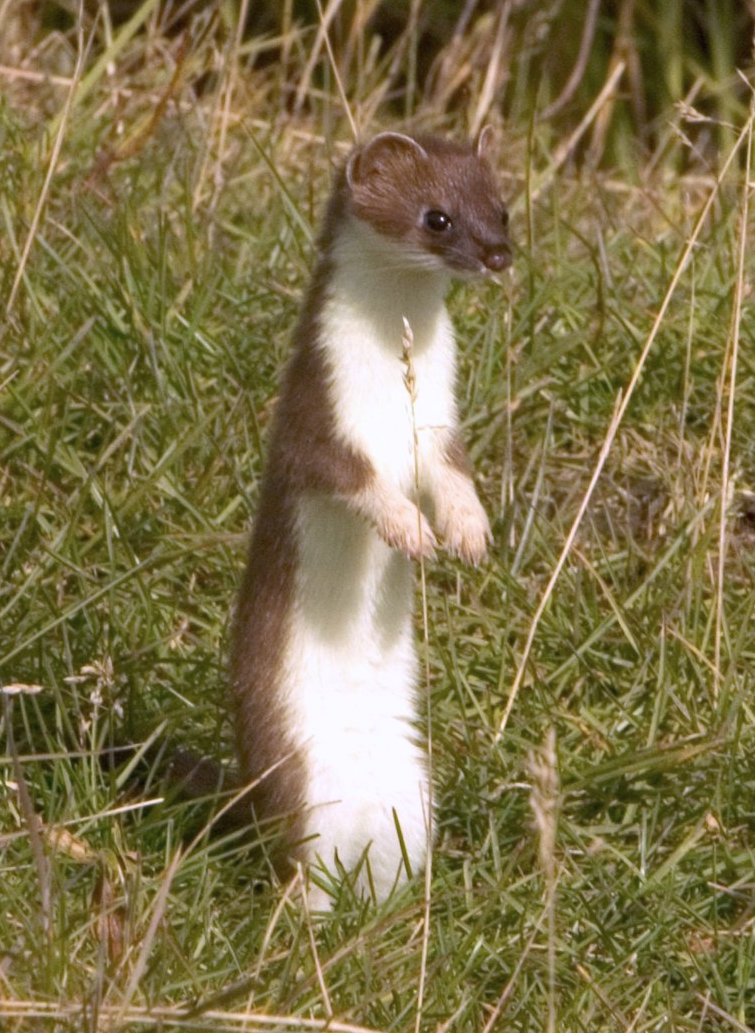
Stoat (ermine)

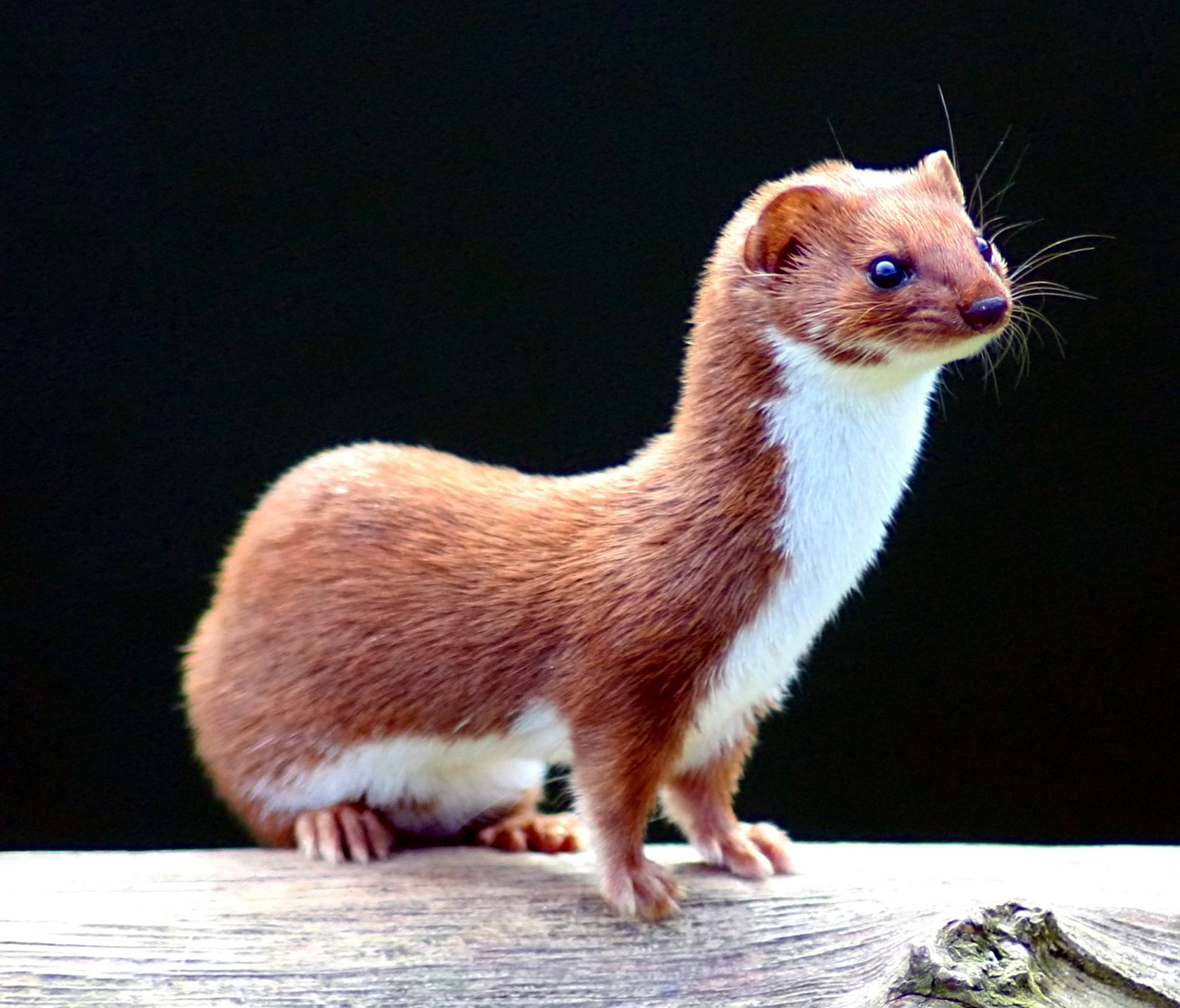
Least weasel

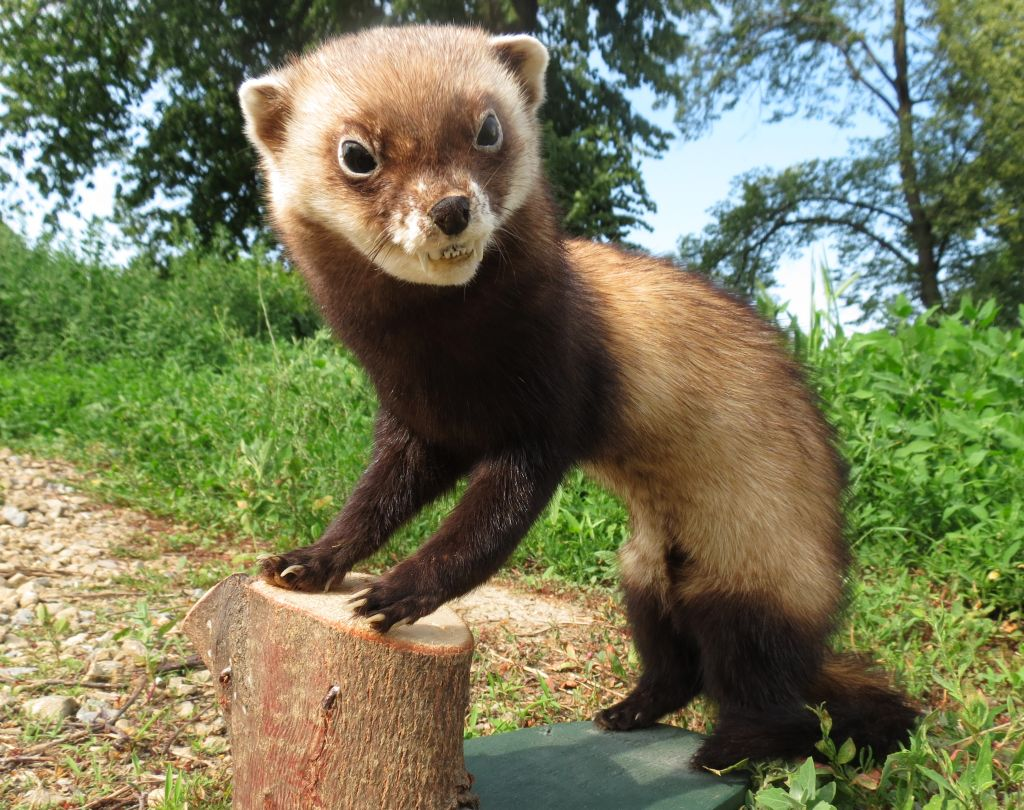
Steppe polecat

Mountain weasel

In Chinese, the wolverine is called "sable bear" because it is bigger than a sable and smaller than a bear and resembles both animals. The animal lives in caves and dens, which they do not dig but take from other animals such as bears, foxes and bobak marmots. Wolverines are fierce creatures that will fight bears and wolves for food. They are found in the Greater Khingan range of Heilongjiang and Inner Mongolia and the Altai Mountains of northern Xinjiang, and number only about 200.

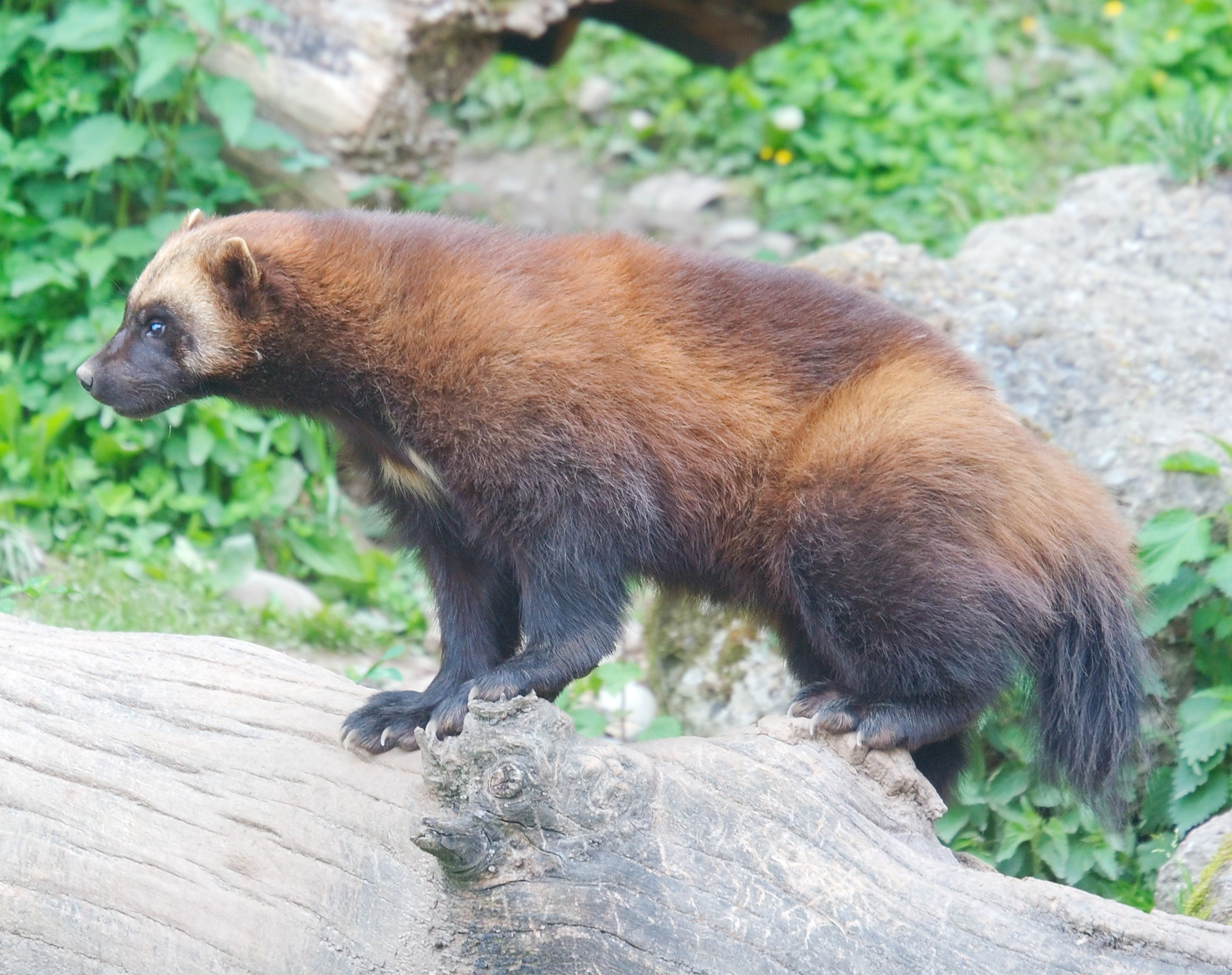
Wolverine

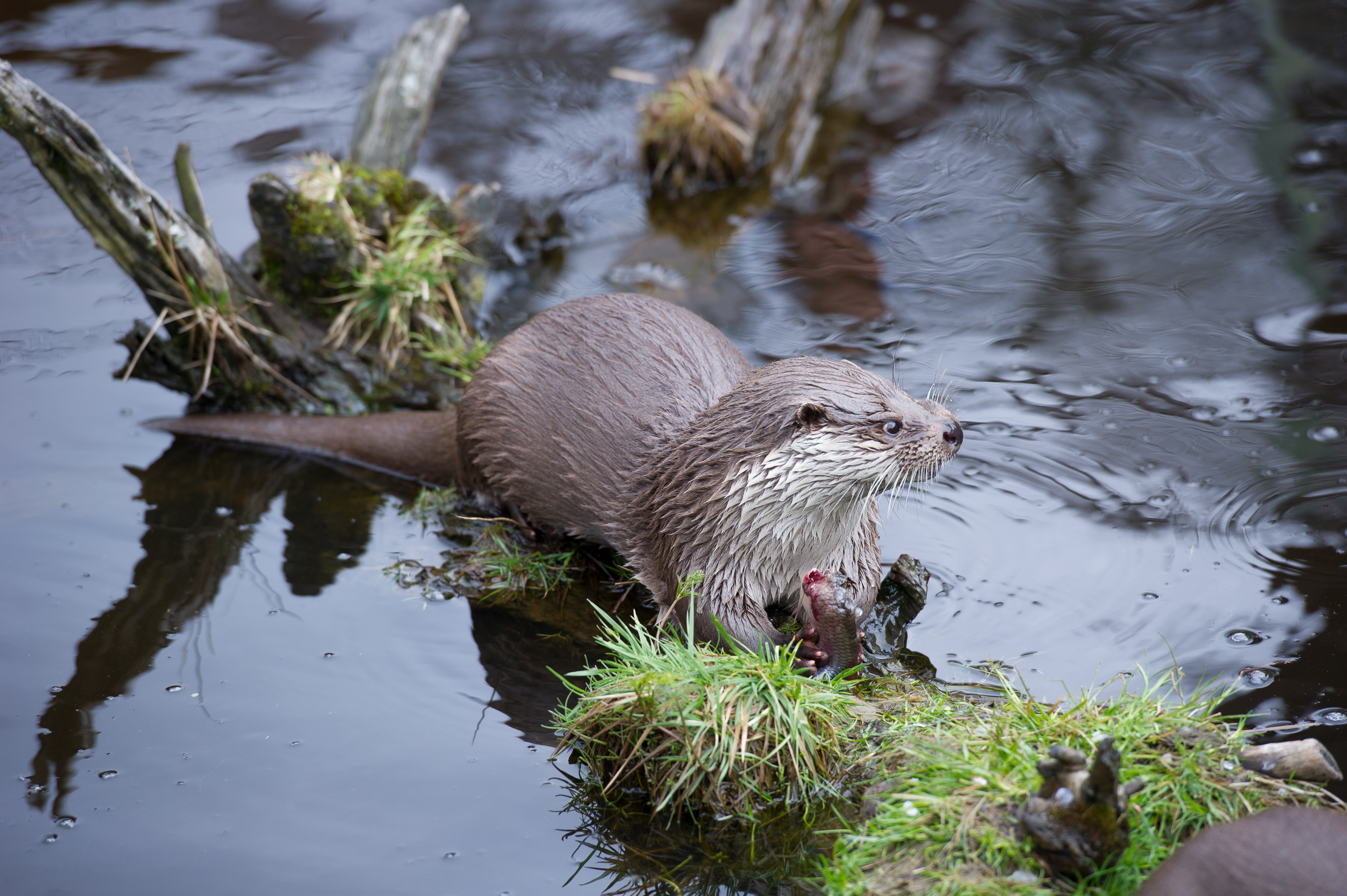
European otter

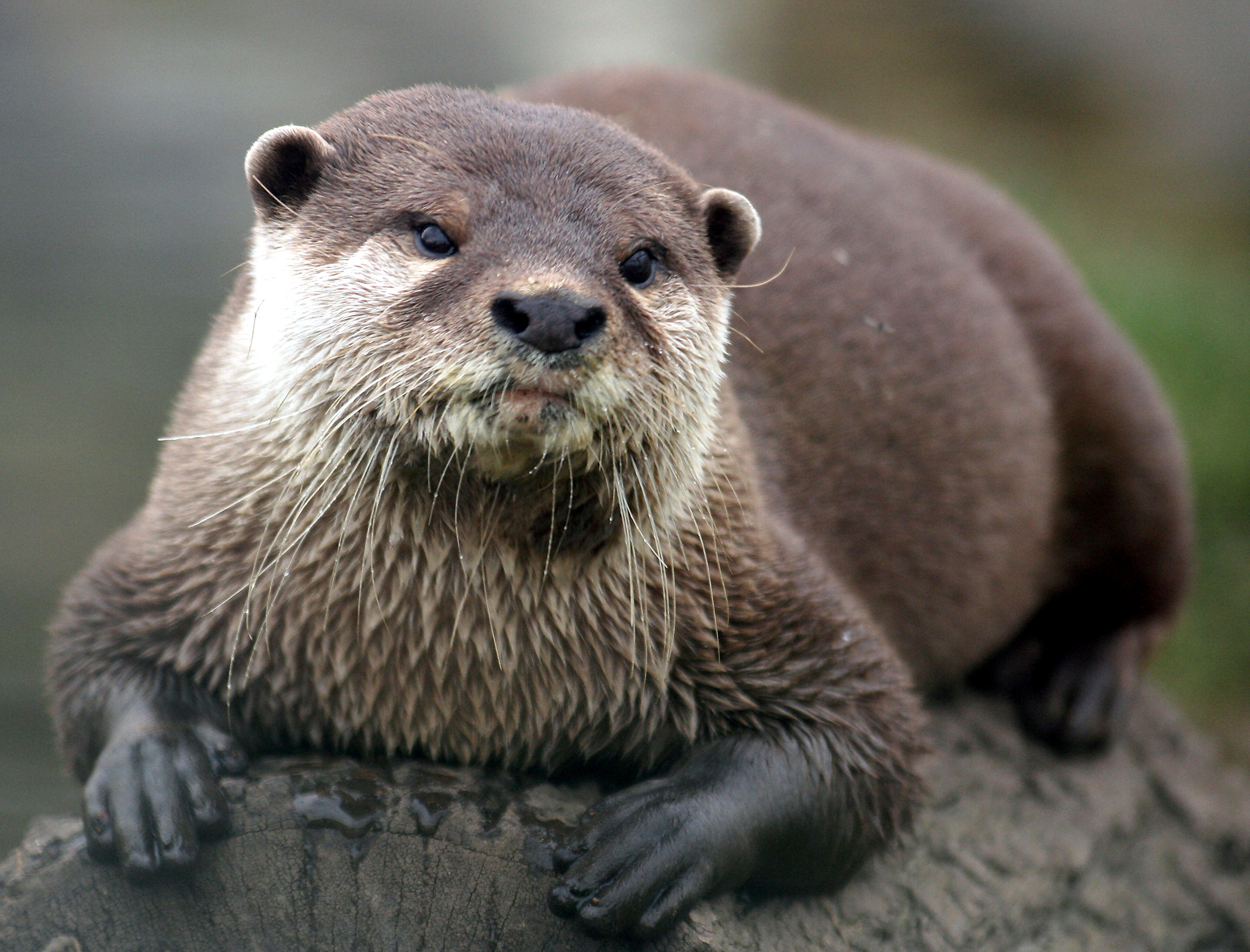
Oriental small-clawed otter

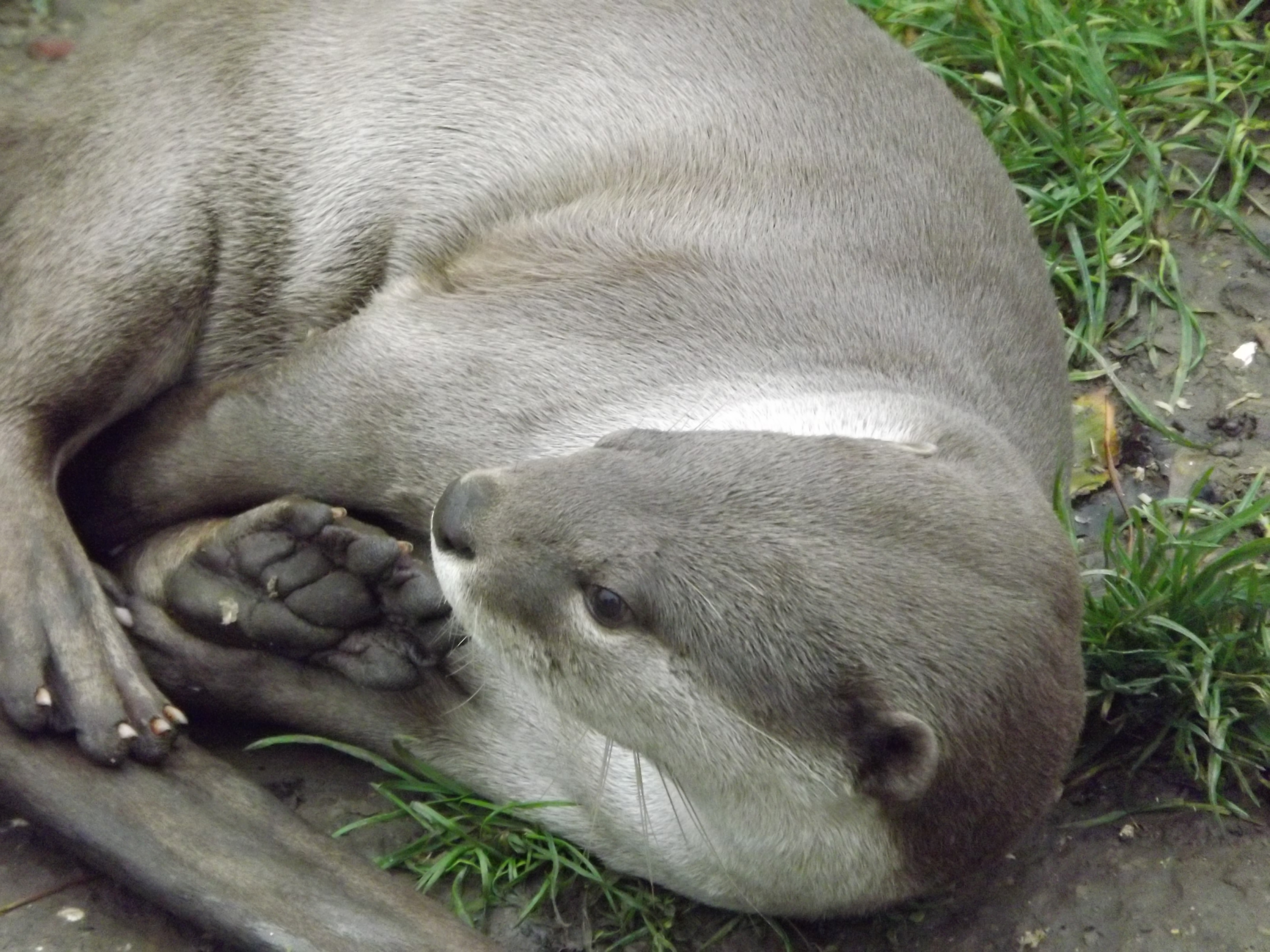
Smooth-coated otter

The European otter is found throughout much of Eurasia and China. It is nearly extinct on Taiwan though some have been found on the island of Kinmen, off the coast of Fujian. The Oriental small-clawed otter is the smallest otter species and lives in mangrove and freshwater swamps of southern China and Taiwan. The smooth-coated otter is confined to parts of Yunnan and Guangdong.

Like sable and martens, otter fur is also used make clothing. Sables and wolverines are Class I protected species. Martens and otters are Class II protected species.

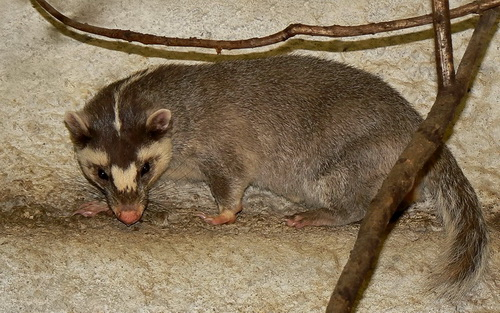
Chinese ferret-badger

Badgers have distinctive white stripes on their faces with one long stripe that extends from nose to tail. The Asian badger is found throughout China proper and the eastern Himalayas. The hog badger has a pig-like snout and has a slightly smaller range than the Asian badger. Ferret-badgers are the smallest badgers and two species live in China. The Chinese ferret-badger is found across much of southern China south of the Yangtze River and the Burmese ferret-badger along Yunnan's border with Laos and Vietnam.

==== Seals, sea lions ====
Pinnipeds are also classified as carnivores and are divided between earless or true seals and eared seals. True seals do not have ears and cannot get their hind flippers underneath their bodies to crawl. Eared seals, which include sea lions, in contrast, have protruding ears and can "walk" with all four limbs on land.

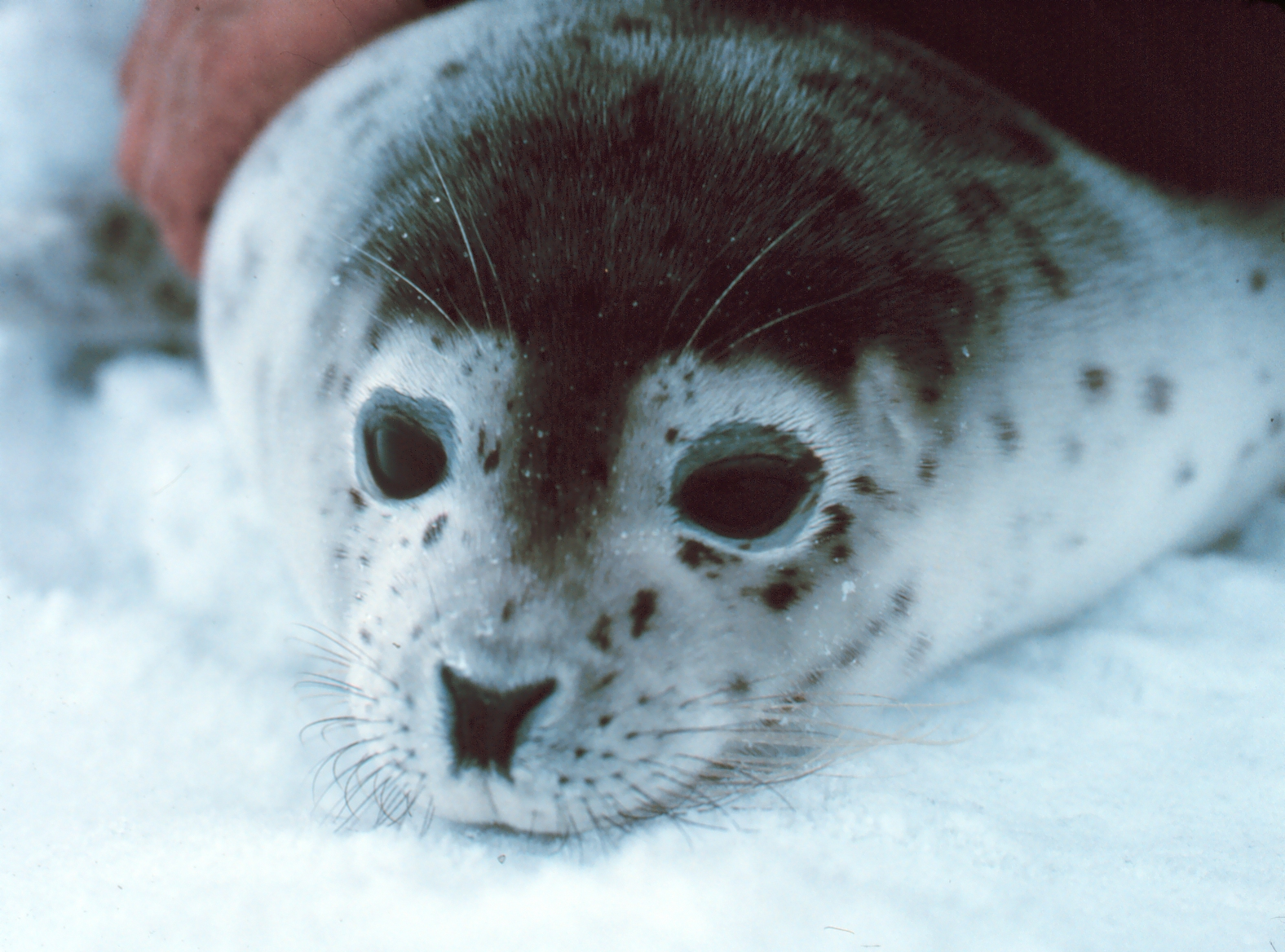
Spotted seal

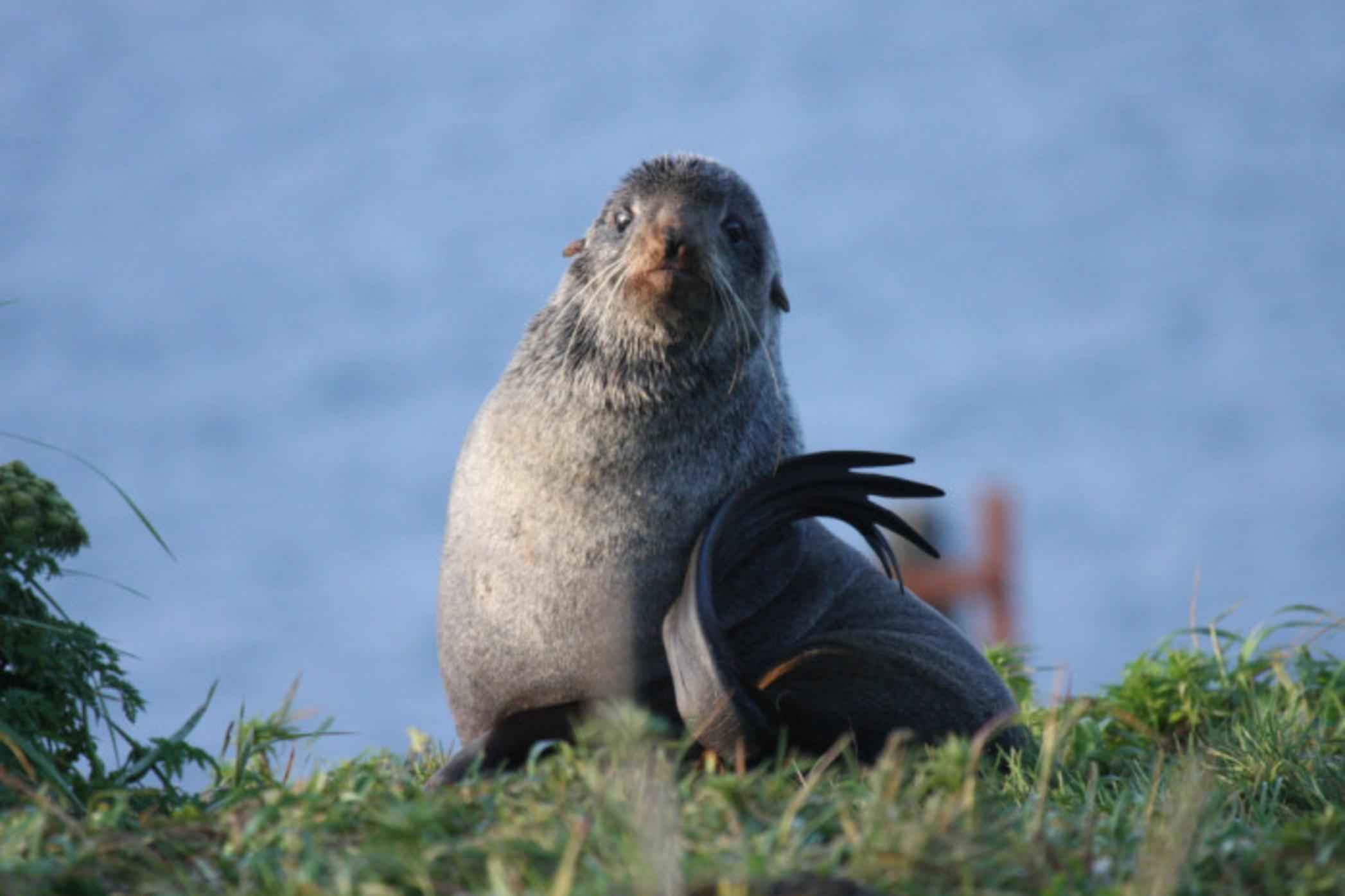
Northern fur seal

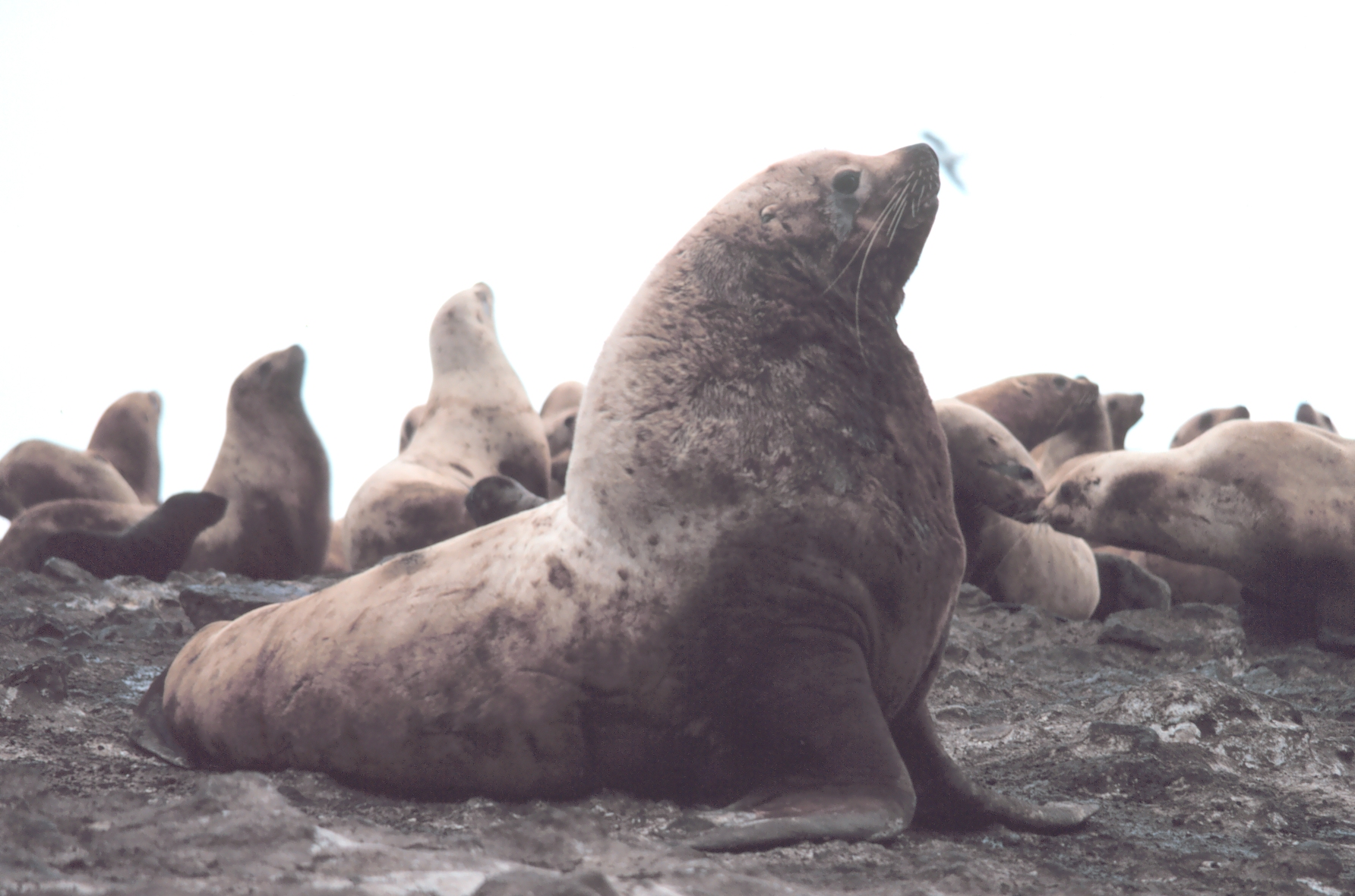
Steller sea lion

True seals in China include the bearded seal which is found along the coast of Zhejiang, Fujian and Guangdong in the East and South China Sea, the ringed seal in the Yellow Sea, and spotted seal, which is primarily found in the Bohai Gulf and the northern Yellow Sea, but have been seen as far south as Guangdong. All seals are Class II protected animal. Sea lions have Class I protection.

The spotted seal is the only seal species that breeds in China. Its breeding grounds are found along the rim of Liaodong Bay in the Bohai Gulf, including the estuary at the mouth of the Shuangtaizi River near Panjin and Changxing Island near Dalian, and Baengnyeongdo sanctuary in the Korean exclusive economic zone. These seals have been poached for its fur and genitals, which were used to make an aphrodisiac. Their habitats have also been heavily damaged by land reclamation, fish farming, and petroleum development. A South Korean NGO has been trying to increase public awareness and support for the protection of the seals in China, North Korea and South Korea. Protection stations have been set up to monitor the breeding grounds and wildlife protection authorities compensate fisherman who turn in live seals caught in their nets. In April 2011, the construction of an express highway along the coast was halted due to its adverse impact on the seal breeding ground. Satellite trackings revealed that not only within Yellow Sea, but also seals can migrate even between Primorsky Krai in Russia to Yellow Sea, exceeding 3,300 km in total. Recoveries and recolonizations have been observed recently, such as along the coast of Shandong in 1999, and in the Miaodao Islands of the Bohai Sea since 2000s.

The northern fur seal, an eared seal, occasionally appears off the coast of eastern and southern China and southern Taiwan. The largest of the eared seals is the Steller sea lion, who lives primarily in the Arctic but is also seen along the Yellow Sea coast in Jiangsu and Bohai Gulf in Liaoning. Among Yellow Sea – adjacent areas within the Korean EEZ, occurrence can be on locations such as at Jeju Island.

=== Whales, dolphins, porpoises ===
China has cetacean species that live in both freshwater and the sea. The nearly extinct baiji dolphin and Chinese white dolphin are Class I protected species. All other cetaceans in China are Class II protected species.

In total, 22 species of smaller cetaceans inhabit within Chinese, Taiwanese, Hong Kong's, and Macau's waters including Baiji. Although being not officially recognized, the presence of Irrawaddy dolphins have been questioned.

In ancient China, inscriptions of the whales varied and inscriptions of whales and sharks were occasionally mixed. During the Qing dynasty, certain knowledge on whales had been deepened with the establishment of whaling industries in Guangdong, Guangxi and Hainan although both oceanic and freshwater dolphins had been classified as different animals from whales. It is said that climate change during the dynasty caused small fish to flourish within Yellow and Bohai Seas and drew large numbers of whales into the basins.

The Republic of China was one of the early signatories of the International Convention for the Regulation of Whaling. The People's Republic of China signed convention in September 1980 and banned domestic whaling in 1981, and also signed in the Convention on the Conservation of Migratory Species of Wild Animals.

Until recently, observing live cetaceans nonetheless of any species including minke whales and smaller dolphins and porpoises are very rare in Bohai and Yellow Seas within Chinese side, however, increases in confirmation of minke whales and other species have been confirmed in larger part of Yellow Sea basin especially around Changhai County due to improves in water quality and productivity achieved by fishery regulations and creating ocean farms on Zhangzi Island, and local industries have been considered to operate whale watching tours as a future prospect. Modern distributions of cetaceans both on continent and oceanic islands including Taiwan are largely biased on toothed whales due to severe declines of baleen whales.

==== Baiji ====
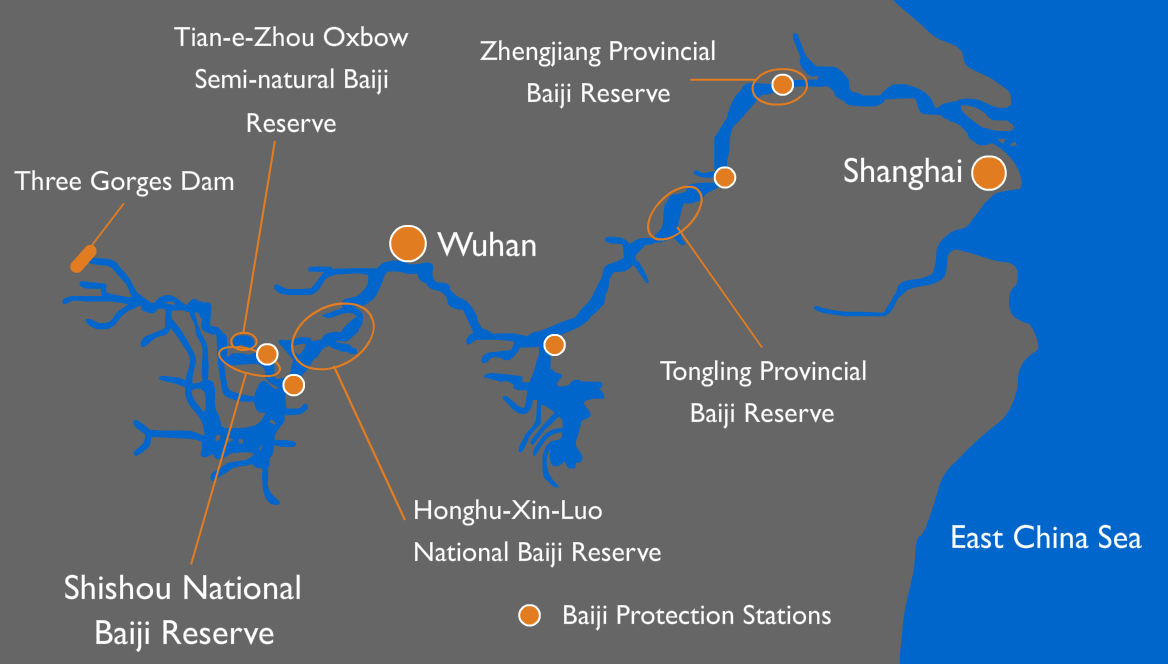
Baiji dolphin reserves

The baiji dolphin's habit historically covered much of the Yangtze River and its tributaries and lakes, from Yichang to Shanghai. It is mentioned in historical records going back 2,000 years. According to legend, the baiji dolphin is the reincarnation of a princess and called the Goddess of the Yangtze. As recently as the 1950s, there were as many as 6,000 baiji dolphins in China, but their number fell to the hundreds by the 1980s, under 100 in the 1990s and fewer than a dozen since 2000.

The Yangtze River catchment area is one of the most densely populated areas in China and the world. The river, China's longest, is also a major highway for ships. Water and noise pollution, commercial fishing, and large propellers of ships are all major threats to the baiji. The building of the Gezhouba Dam in the 1970s and the Three Gorges Dam in the 1990s blocked the access of the dolphins upstream, altered the seasonal flow of the river, and enabled large oceangoing ships to sail on the river.

By 1997, a survey of the river found only 13 baiji. A Sino-Swiss joint survey of the river from Yichang to Shanghai in 2006 found no animals and declared the species to be functionally extinct, that is, even if a few individuals continued to survive, their numbers are too few to reproduce. The last sighting confirmed by zoologist was in 2004 when a dead baiji dolphin washed ashore near Nanjing.

Nature reserves to protect the baiji dolphin were established along the Yangtze in Hunan, Hubei and Anhui province, along with observation and captive centers. The longest living baiji dolphin in captivity, Qiqi, lived in a dolphinarium in Wuhan from 1980 to 2002. The Tian-e-Zhou Oxbow Nature Reserve, created out of an oxbow bend in the Yangtze was designed as a captive breeding area for the baiji. One baiji was sent there in 1995 but died in 1996. The reserve is now a breeding ground for the finless porpoise.

==== Finless porpoise ====
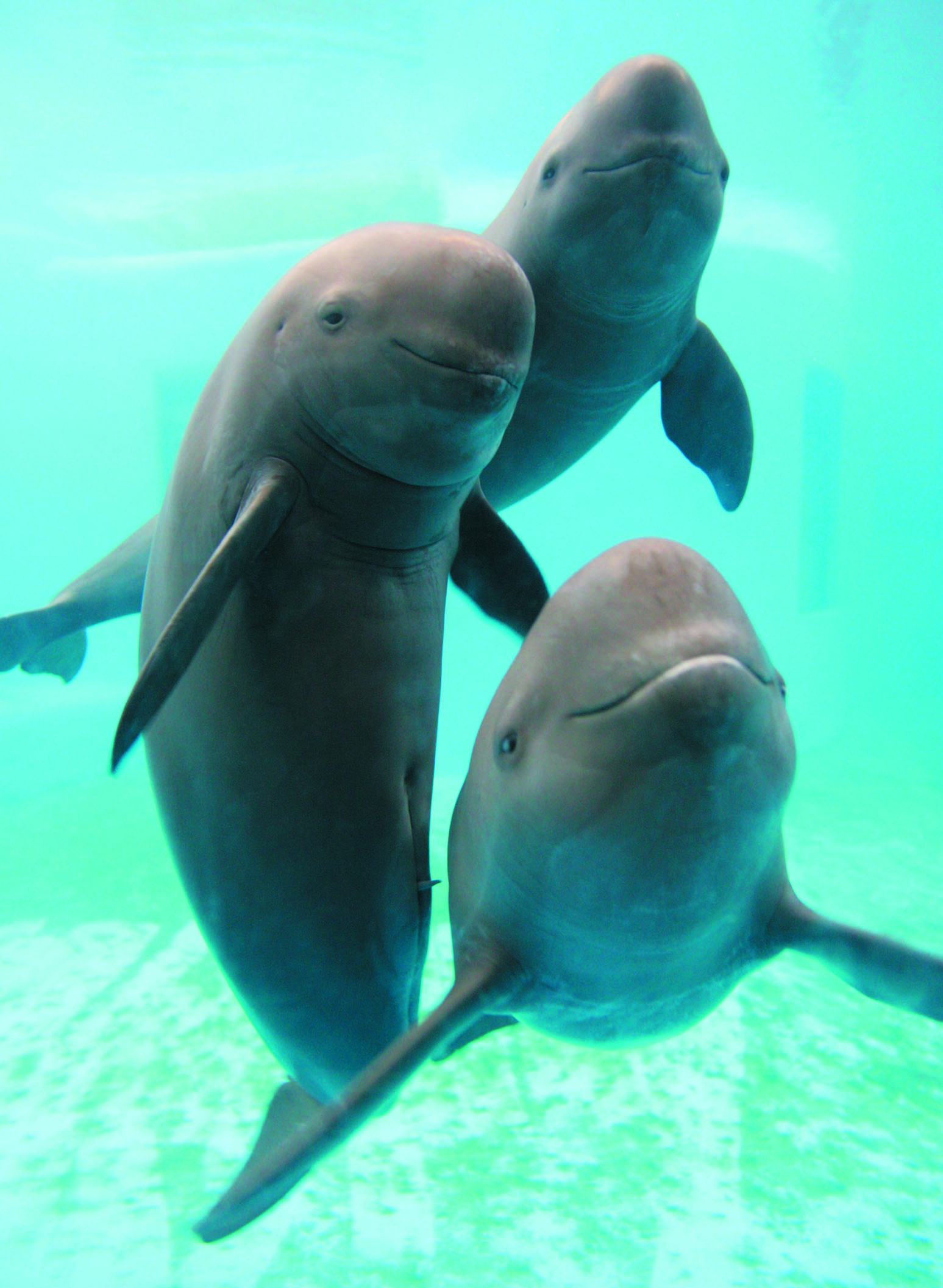
Narrow-ridged finless porpoises

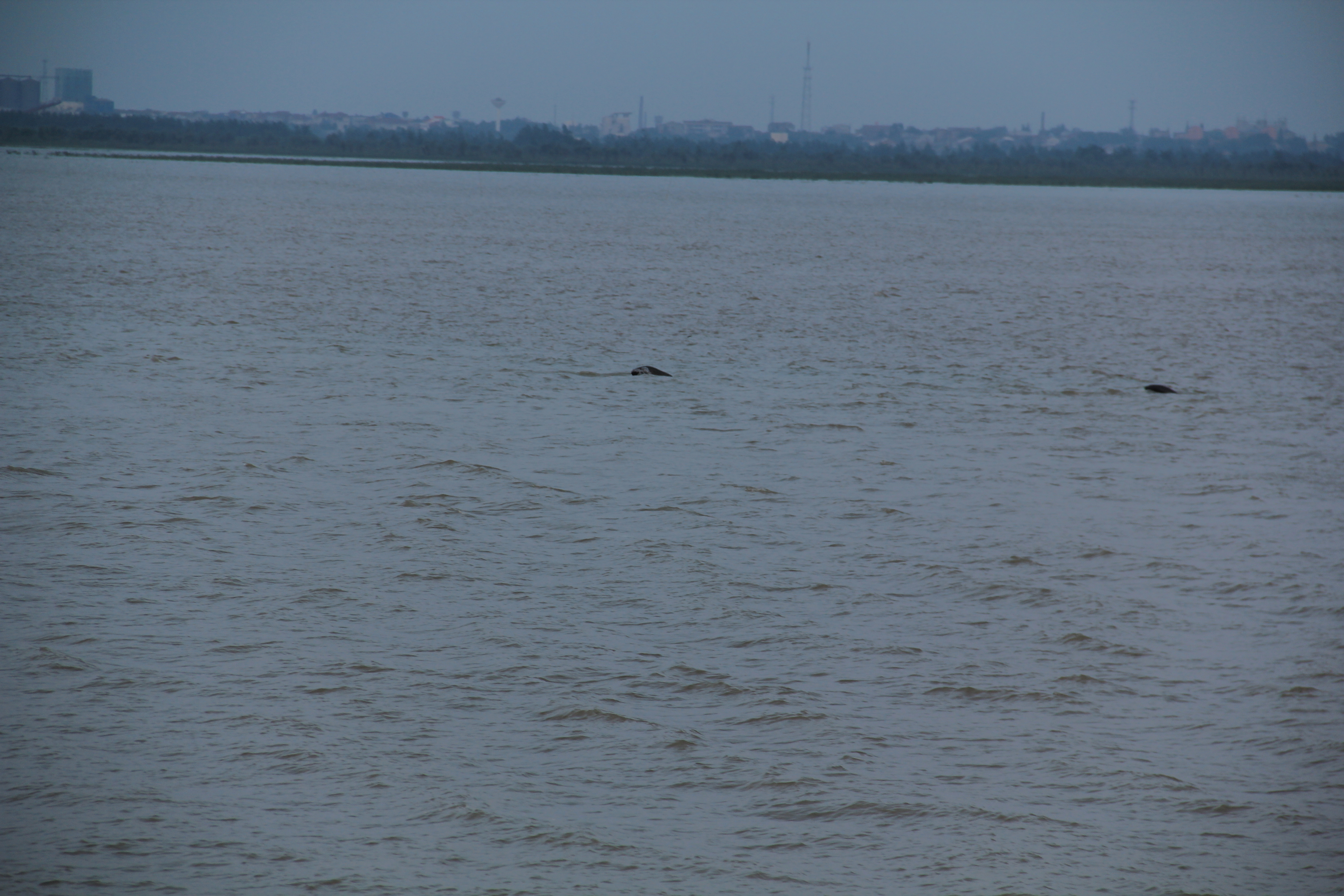
Finless porpoises in Lake Dongting

At least two subspecies of finless porpoise are known to inhabit coastal waters such as off Dalian< Nanjing, Nanji Islands Marine Sanctuary, Jiushan Chain IslandsWeizhou Island, and at Matsu Islands. A freshwater subspecies lives in the Yangtze, Gan and Xiang Rivers. Unlike dolphins, they lack a dorsal fin. The freshwater porpoise faces the same threat as the baiji. In April 2012, twelve were found dead in Dongting Lake in a span of 44 days. Construction of the Poyang Lake Dam may cause severe damages on remaining population.

As of 2012, the Tian-e-Zhou Oxbow Nature Reserve had about 40 finless porpoises with another 85 in Dongting Lake and 300–400 in Poyang Lake. The freshwater finless porpoise, a Class II protected species, is rarer than the giant panda. They are also well present in Gulf of Tonkin.

In recent years, small concentrations have been confirmed at the estuaries on the mouth of Yellow River in Lijin County. Stable numbers of porpoises, two subspecies being involved, have been found recently along Chongming Island where the local waters show drastic recovery thanks to efforts to improve water quality.

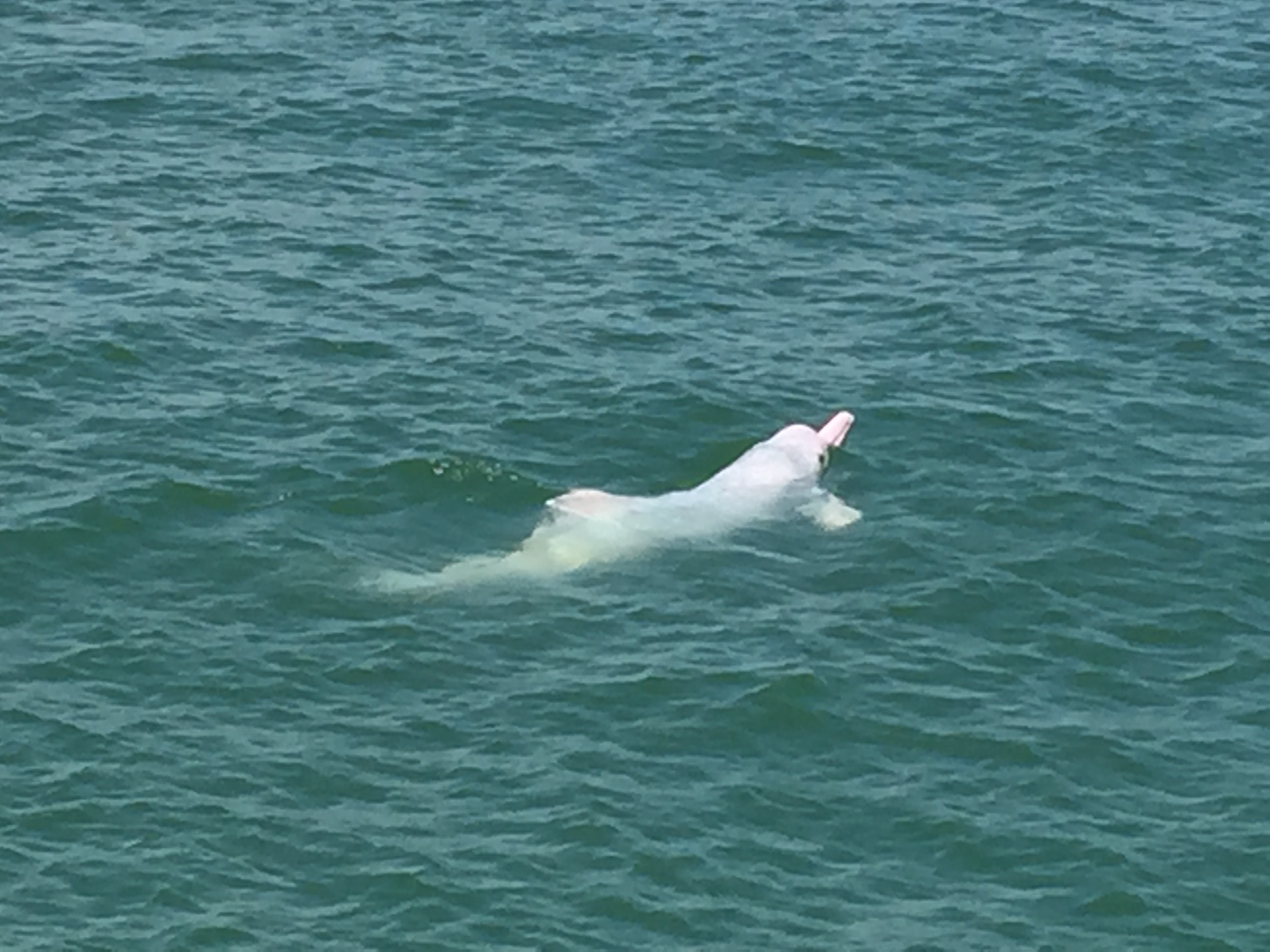
Sousa in special sanctuary on Lantau Island in Hong Kong

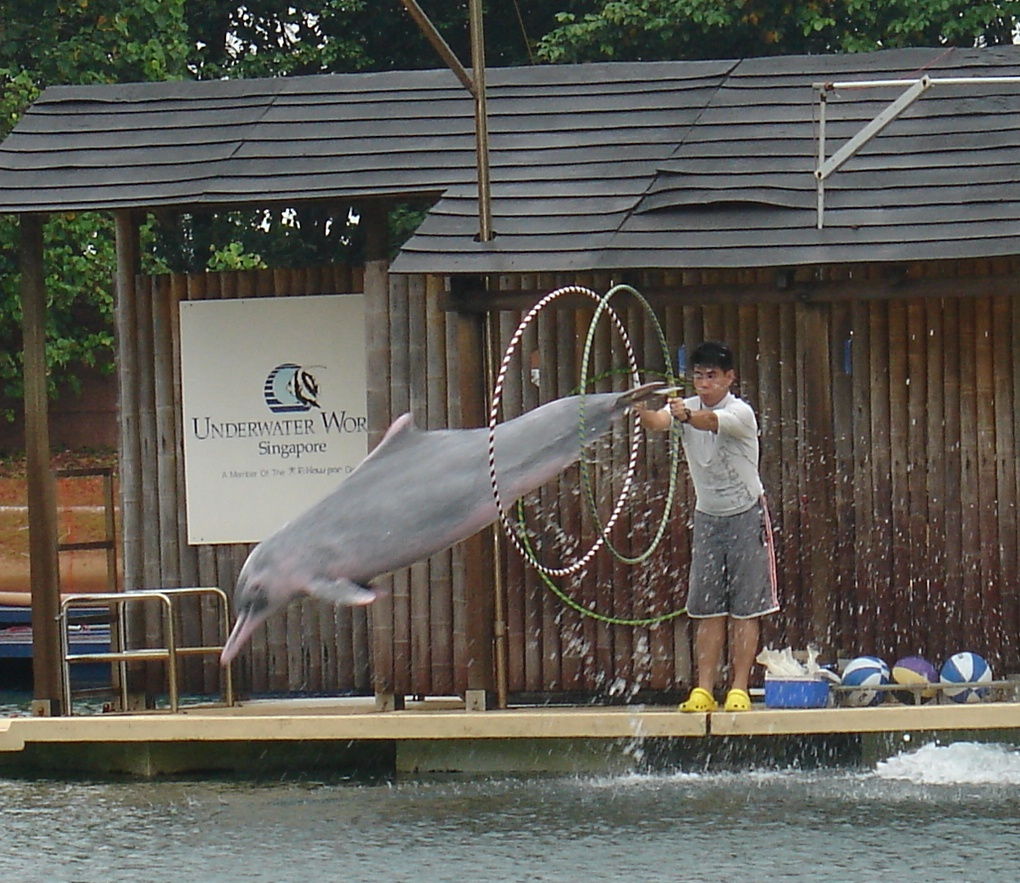
Chinese white dolphin

==== Oceanic dolphins ====
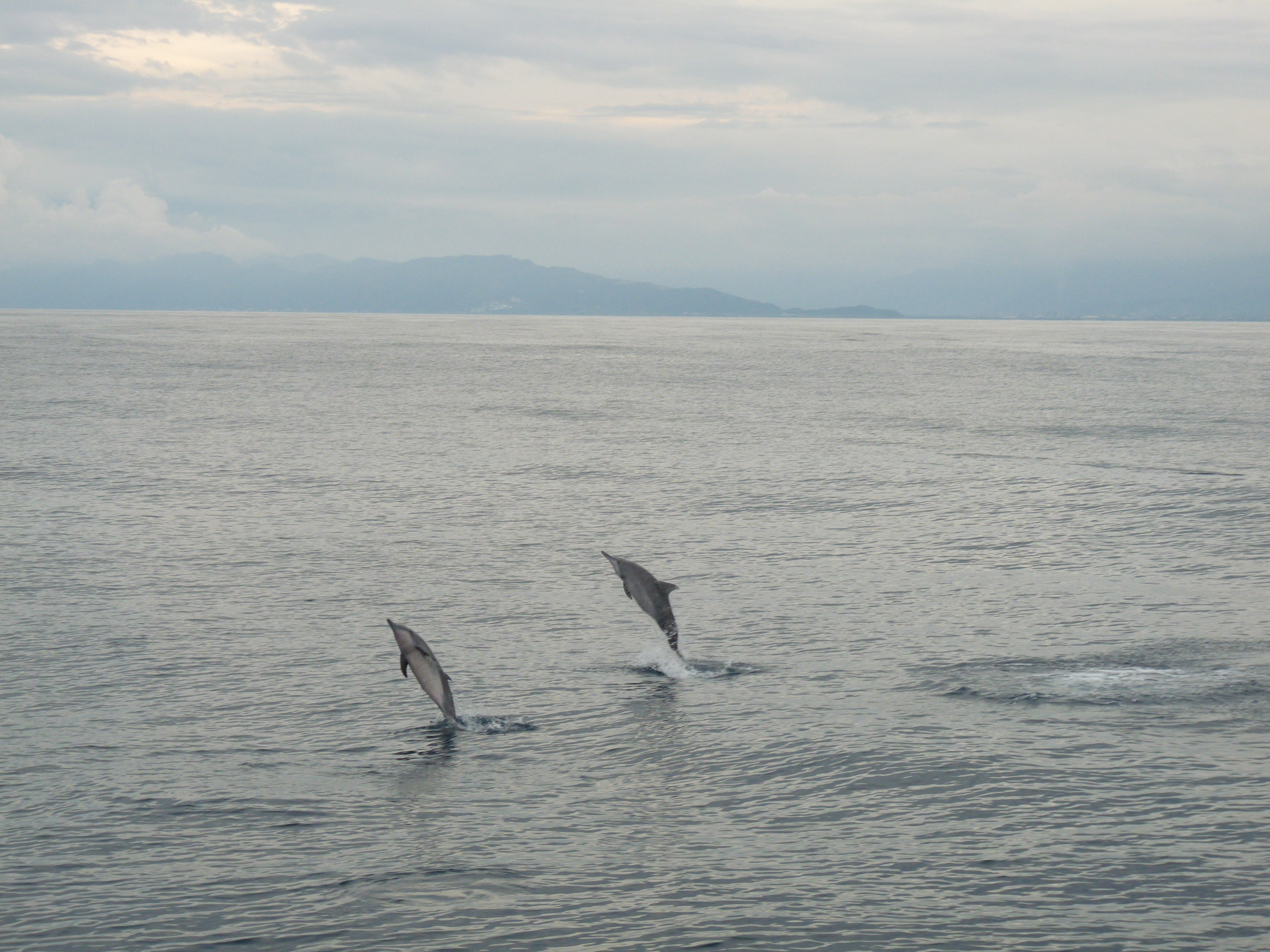
Spinner dolphins off Hualien City, Taiwan

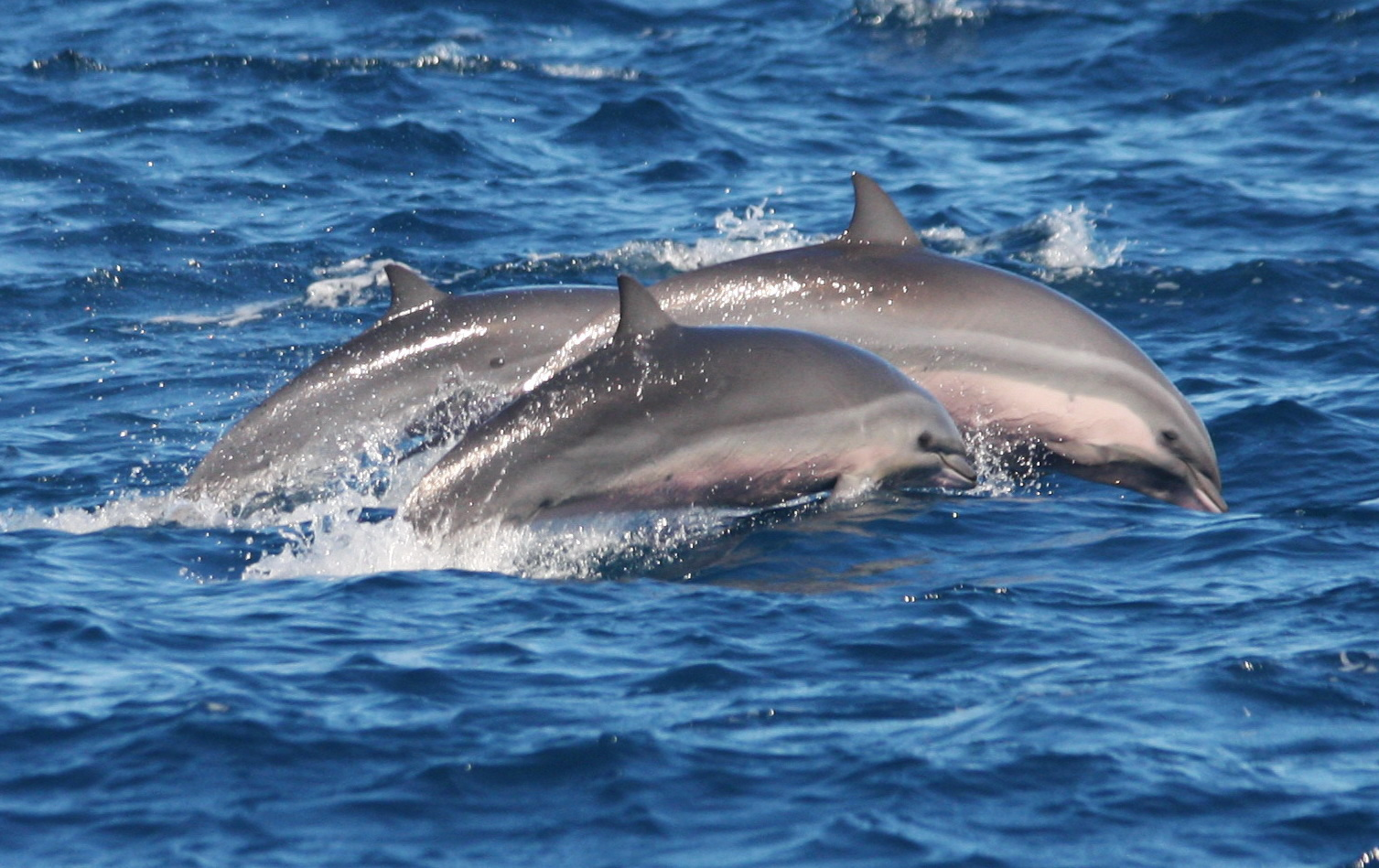
Fraser's dolphins off Hualien City, Taiwan

Sousa, the Chinese white dolphin (locally called the Matsu's fish) that was previously considered to be a subspecies of the Indo-Pacific humpback dolphin, lives in the waters off southern China including Wanshan Archipelago, Nanji Islands, the Pearl River Delta, and Hong Kong, Gulf of Tonkin Hainan Island such as around Sanya Bay, Paracel Islands, and on Penghu Islands to the western coast of Taiwan, mainland coast along the Formosa Strait such as at Xiamen and Xiapu County, and Nánpēng Islands Marine Sanctuary in Nan'ao County, and Sanniang Bay dolphin sanctuary in Qingzhou. The Chinese white dolphin is a symbol of Hong Kong, and special sanctuary has been declared to protect the species with approaches to co-exist with sustainable dolphin watching, although the local population is in serious peril.

Other oceanic dolphin species include the Pacific white-sided, spinner, striped, short-beaked common, long-beaked common, Fraser's, pantropical spotted, rough-toothed, common bottlenose, Indo-Pacific bottlenose, and Risso's dolphin. Risso's dolphins are one of the most common cetaceans along the east coast of Taiwan.

==== Whales ====
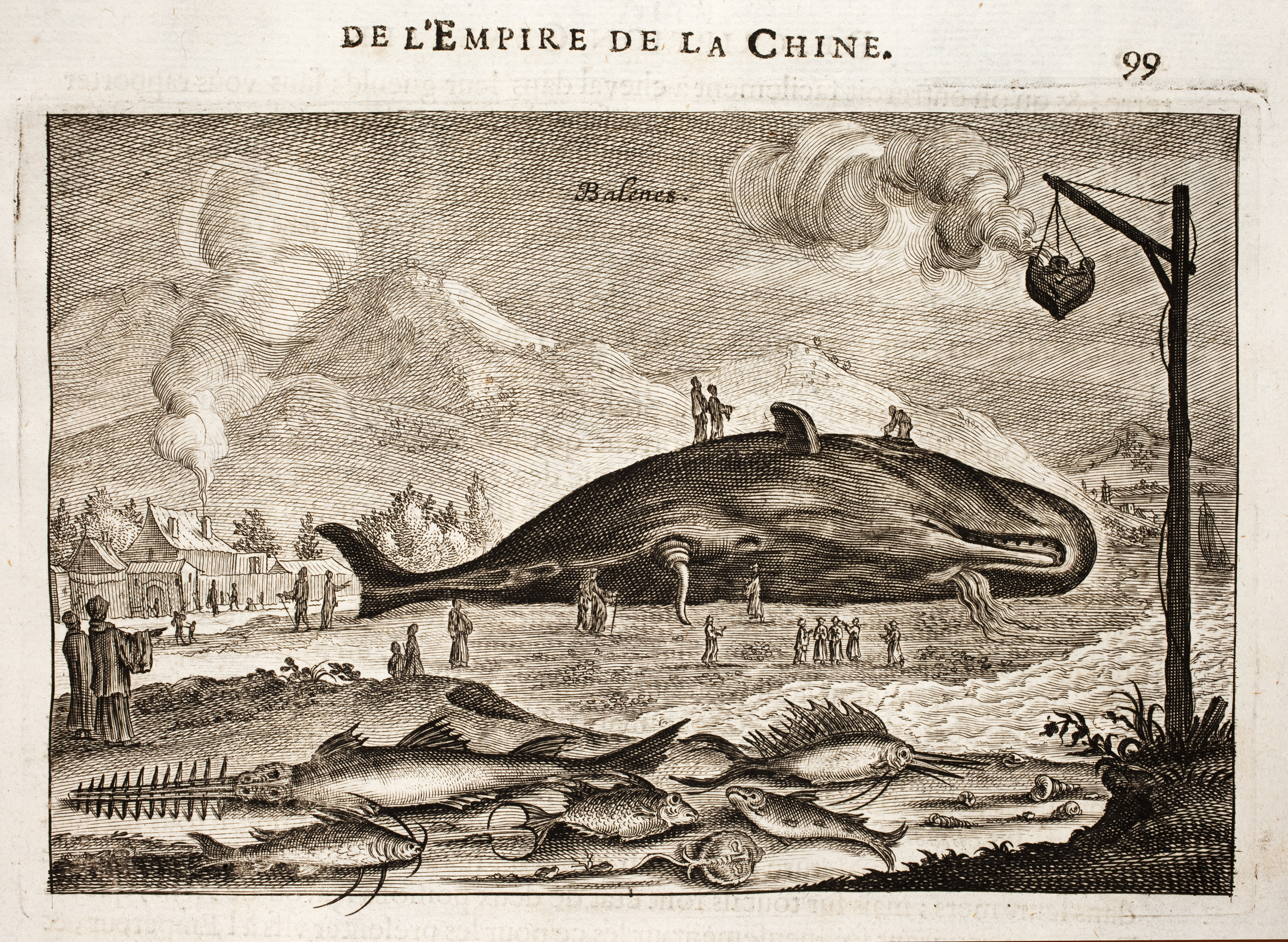
Engraving of a sperm whale and various fish ashore on the Chinese coast

Whales were historically abundant in Chinese and Taiwanese waters especially in the winter and spring whene they come to coastal areas to breed and calve, while especially baleen whales other than those which migrated from the outer Pacific and Sea of Japan swam northward to feed in the Yellow and Bohai basins during warmer seasons. Most of the large whales in Taiwan were recorded prior to 1952. In imperial times, villages along the coast of the Leizhou Peninsula in Guangdong hunted whales and made offerings of whale oil to the emperor in Beijing. On the other hand, however, like among other nations such as in Korea, China, Ebis in Japan, Indonesia, among Indochina including in Vietnam where whales were once well respected, heavenly deities among coastal people, regarded as the "King of the sea", the "Dragon emperor in the ocean", or "Dragon Soldiers" in almost entire coastal regions excluding above mentioned Hainan and Leizhou, as when whales were seen, fishermen and boats had to make ways for them and wait the whales to pass. In Chinese mythology, for example, Yu-kiang, the ruler of the sea, is said to be a whale with arms and legs. Indigenous tribes on Taiwan also recognized the presences of large whales and representing whales in their local myths and folklores.

Baleen whales found in the ocean off China's coast include the blue whale, the world's largest animal, as well as the Eden's, Omura's, Bryde's, common minke, fin, sei, and humpback whales. Historically, there had been an endemic, resident population of fin whales from the Yellow and Bohai Sea to the East China Sea. Minke whales are also resident in the same regions. Historically, Bryde's whales were resident near Taiwan and the southern coast.

In the Chinese EEZ, critically endangered North Pacific right whales and western gray whales had been sighted in the East China Sea and Yellow Sea only on prior to the 1970s, especially for right whales. There had been records of gray whales and the only record in the 21st century was of a mature female accidentally killed in local fisheries near Pingtan in the Taiwan Strait in 2007.

The following statements focus on right and gray whales because their behavioral patterns (high reliance on shallow waters compared to their size, such that they enter river mouths and estuaries regularly, and their curiosity about humans) made it easier for hunters to kill them and they were wiped out faster than other species, but they also apply to the larger whales. Rorquals' situations were similar, but their functional local extinction was caused later in the 20th century by modern Japanese whaling.

The biology and natural history of whales in Chinese waters prior to exploitation is unclear because academic studies or approaches to biology of cetaceans was minimal. The local populations of migratory whales appear to have been intensively hunted to the point of near-functional extinction on the main migratory collider (the Japanese archipelago) by Japanese whaling industries. The fates of right whales, for example, were threatened by legal, illegal and research whaling, and the most devastatingly, the Soviet Union's mass illegal whaling in the 1960s and 1970s.

Gray whales migrating on the coasts of Japanese were wiped out earlier than their Korean counterparts. Other populations along the Korean Peninsula were targeted later. The most intensive hunts of all times were carried out by Japanese whaling industries in the 20th century; these covered a wide range of east Asian waters including almost entire EEZ of China, North Korea and South Korea. Whaling stations, such as at Daya Bay, were established along the Chinese and Korean coastlines causing virtual, functional extinction of almost all species of larger baleen whales in east and southeast Asian nations. The presence of larger cetaceans has not been confirmed.

Toothed whales, excluding dolphins, include the sperm, dwarf sperm, pygmy sperm, Baird's beaked, Longman's beaked, Cuvier's beaked, Blainville's beaked, ginkgo-toothed beaked whales, and the orca and pilot whales (false killer, pygmy killer, melon-headed, short-finned pilot). False killers still remain along coasts of mainland China, and are known to enter rivers regularly in particular regions.

Stranding of toothed whales has been common on Taiwanese coasts.

Large whales have become very rare on today's Chinese coasts where only tiny remnants of minke whales or several more survived. However, whale watching industries became popular attractions along the east coast of Taiwan, offering excellent opportunities to observe majestic creatures, especially in the summer. Recently, whale watching has been considered in the Yellow Sea based on recoveries whale populations. Larger rorquals have been sighted in pelagic waters occasionally. Whales migrating through Tsushima Strait possibly to Chinese waters are under serious threat of being struck by high-speed vessels.

Older and modern whaling records suggest that there had been historical summering and wintering/calving grounds for baleen whales in various areas along coastal China particularly in several locations. Below is a list showing some of those areas corresponding with baleen and few of larger toothed whales, but excluding undiscovered or unstudied regions and species.

===== Baleen whales =====
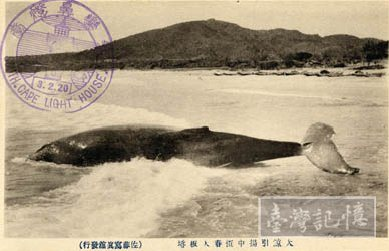
Landed humpback whale on Nan Wan Bay nearby Cape Eluanbi in Hengchun during Japanese colonial days in 1920s

- Right whales – Yellow Sea (especially adjacent to the island of Haiyang Dao where the junction of warmer and colder ocean currents exists nearby and all the modern appearances of the species on mainland coasts of China were concentrated), Shanghai and Zhoushan Islands, Guangdong and Huiyang, and in Taiwan Strait such as along coasts of Fujian (e.g.Pingtan Island), Penghu Islands, and Taiwan, and some reaching Hainan and Leizhou The first documented stranding of the species in China was in Shandong Province between 2000 and 2006. The first sighting in China was at Shenzhen in 2015 although the observation was reported as a humpback, and the first of living animal in Sea of Japan since after the whaling was recorded at Namhae near Busan in February 2015 and this was the first confirmation of the species since after the last record in Korean EEZ in 1974. Since 1901, records have been concentrated to the vicinity of Amami Ōshima including sightings in 1997 and 2014, and the first confirmed whale in west coast of Kyushu strayed into the port of Ushibuka, Kumamoto in 2014.
  - Based on studies to find coastal foraging grounds, wintering distributions may also include areas along the Zhejiang coast. It is unknown if there had been a summer population of this species to in the Yellow and Bohai seas, however copepods within the basins and the geography indicate some whales might have summered there.
- Gray and humpback whales – Yellow and Bohai Sea such as at Qingdao, Zhoushan Islands, Taiwan, Zhejiang, Guangdong, Nánpēng Islands, Liaonin, Fujian to south of Hailing Bay, Daya Bay, Hong Kong, Hainan, Qizhou Liedao Islands (humpback), Wailuo Harbour, Paracel Islands, and so on.
  - Only about 130 gray whales survive today, but some recent studies indicate that the original Asian population might have been functionally extinct, and those whales seen on Sakhalin and Kamchatka could originate in the well-recovering eastern population. Fossil and catch records suggest there were once wintering/calving areas in Taiwan and adjacent areas. The most recent known record in Korean waters was the sighting of a pair off Bangeojin, Ulsan in 1977.
  - In 2011, gray whales were acoustically detected among pelagic waters in the East China Sea between China and Japan.
  - Historical catches of humpbacks on the southern coasts of the nation were small, hence it is difficult to determine the population before exploitation. There was once a foraging area on the southern coasts along the Bashi Channel around Kenting National Park or near the southern coasts and islands of Taiwan like Xiaoliuqiu Island and Dapeng Bay. Today, their numbers along the east coast of Taiwan are very small despite efforts of whale-watching companies. Sightings, including of a cow-calf pair, have occurred the along east coast of Taiwan. Whales were once abundant near Pingtung County and sporadic individuals have been observed off the east coast, Hualien and at islands such as Green Island and Orchid Island. The first confirmation in Taiwan was of a pair off Hualien in 1994, and there was a successful unentanglement off Taitung in 1999. In 2000 a whale was sighted around Orchid Island and sightings have been reported almost annually at Green Island and Orchid Island, however, relative short stays in these waters indicate that they are not winter foraging grounds. There were documented sightings of humpback whales around Hong Kong in 2009 and 2016. Possibly the first confirmed sighting, in the Yellow Sea, was of three animals including a cow-calf pair off Changhai County in 2015. Few whales now migrate through the Sea of Japan, the Tsushima Strait, and further reaching the Korean Peninsula.
  - Based on historical catches and observations, some gray whales could have occurred year round off China, possibly summering in the Bohai Sea. There had been at least 24 records of gray whales in Chinese waters since 1933 including sightings, strandings, and bycatch. DNA analysis of a 2011 specimen indicates that this female might not originate in the western population. Whether or not humpback whales ever summered within Yellow and Bohai basins is unknown.
- Bryde's or Eden's whales – Historically residential among Taiwan, Fujian and Guangdong to Hong Kong, Hainan and Leizhou, and Gulf of Tonkin such as off Weizhou and Xieyang Islands. There have been occasional reported sightings in areas within Hong Kong and Macau to the Gulf of Tonkin, and strandings had been reported from areas such as Zhoushan. The number of whales currently migrating through Tsushima Strait is not clear although they have been observed on numerous occasions by the Japan Coast Guard. Twenty-four Bryde's or Eden's whales were caught in the Korean EEZ in the mid-1970s, and one was sighted in the Sea of Japan in 1994.
- Fin whales – Historically resident in the Yellow and Bohai seas and east to the South China Sea off the Paracel Islands, and at least two other local groups, Sea of Japan residents and a group once migrated along the Pacific side of the Japanese archipelago to Chinese waters The East China Sea group is considered to be either functionally extinct or critically endangered due to being one of main targets of Japanese whaling in the 20th century, and today there have been occasional strandings or findings of deceased individuals along sporadic areas from the Yellow and Bohai seas to other parts including southern shores like at Kam District in Wenchang, Shanghai (although the whale was speculated to have died in offshore waters), and Ningbo. The last confirmed sighting near Taiwan is unknown although some media and tourism operators claim that migrations still occur, and whales might still migrate in pelagic waters. The only modern record among the Ryukyu Islands was of a rotten carcass beached on Ishigaki Island in 2005. The last of known record on the Korean Peninsula was in 1973, but there have been recent by-catches along the coasts. Some whales still live in the Sea of Japan and pass through the Tsushima Strait. There had been congregation areas adjacent to Korean Peninsula such as in East Korea Bay and Ulleungdo, although occurrences in these locations are unclear.
  - Fin whales in the Yellow Sea could have been a unique form from outer Pacific populations due to their smaller size, and breeding season was mainly in winter.
- Minke whales – Still be present regularly (although very rare to observe live individuals) in the Yellow and Bohai seas (resident group), Zhoushan, and in coastal and oceanic island areas (e.g. Zhoushan, Penghu, and Parcel Archipelagos). Likely to breed in early to mid – summer, and there may be four major migratory routes within the Yellow and Bohai seas such as along Liaoning Bay, Bohai Strait, and Shandong Peninsula. Off Taiwan, recent sightings and entanglements occurred along the east coast such as at San Diego, Taiwan Strait, or at Hualien. Strandings and by-catches have been in higher rates in the Bohai Sea and at the islands of Haiyang and Zhangzi.
- Blue, sei and Omura's whales – Largely unknown. Blues were known to visit the Yellow and Bohai seas and migrate further south to the Paracel Islands. One was sighted off Weizhou Island in 2017.
  - Blue whales in the coastal northwestern Pacific likely became extinct due to heavy exploitation in the 20th century along southern Japan especially on Wakayama and Shikoku and Miyazaki where the last known catches in the East China Sea (Amami Oshima) were in 1934. The most recent recorded stranding on the Japanese archipelago, other than the Ryukyu Islands, was in the 1950s, and only three blue whales were recorded in Far Eastern Russian waters from 1994 to 2004. Gigantic whales exceeding 20 m in length have been observed in the Tsushima Strait in recent years although their species are unknown. There was a stranding in Wanning in 2005. It is unclear if the whales confirmed in the Bohol Sea in recent years include of the blue whales which had been seen in the Chinese EEZ; it was speculated that these were pygmy blue whales from the Southern Hemisphere.
  - Historic distributions, occurrences, and current statuses of sei, Bryde's (offshore form) and Omura's whales in Chinese and Korean waters are unclear, but their known ranges in Chinese waters reach from the mid to southern coasts facing from the East China Sea and Taiwan to the South China Sea. Scientific confirmation of Omura's whales among continental waters was rather recent. Strandings of Omura's whales have been recorded only south of Zhejiang County. Occasionally, either Bryde's or Omura's whales have been spotted along Taiwan's east coast during whales-watch cruises. There have been sightings along the Taiwanese coast in Hualien and there was a case of re-floating a stranded Bryde's whale near Nantong in 2005.

===== Toothed whales =====
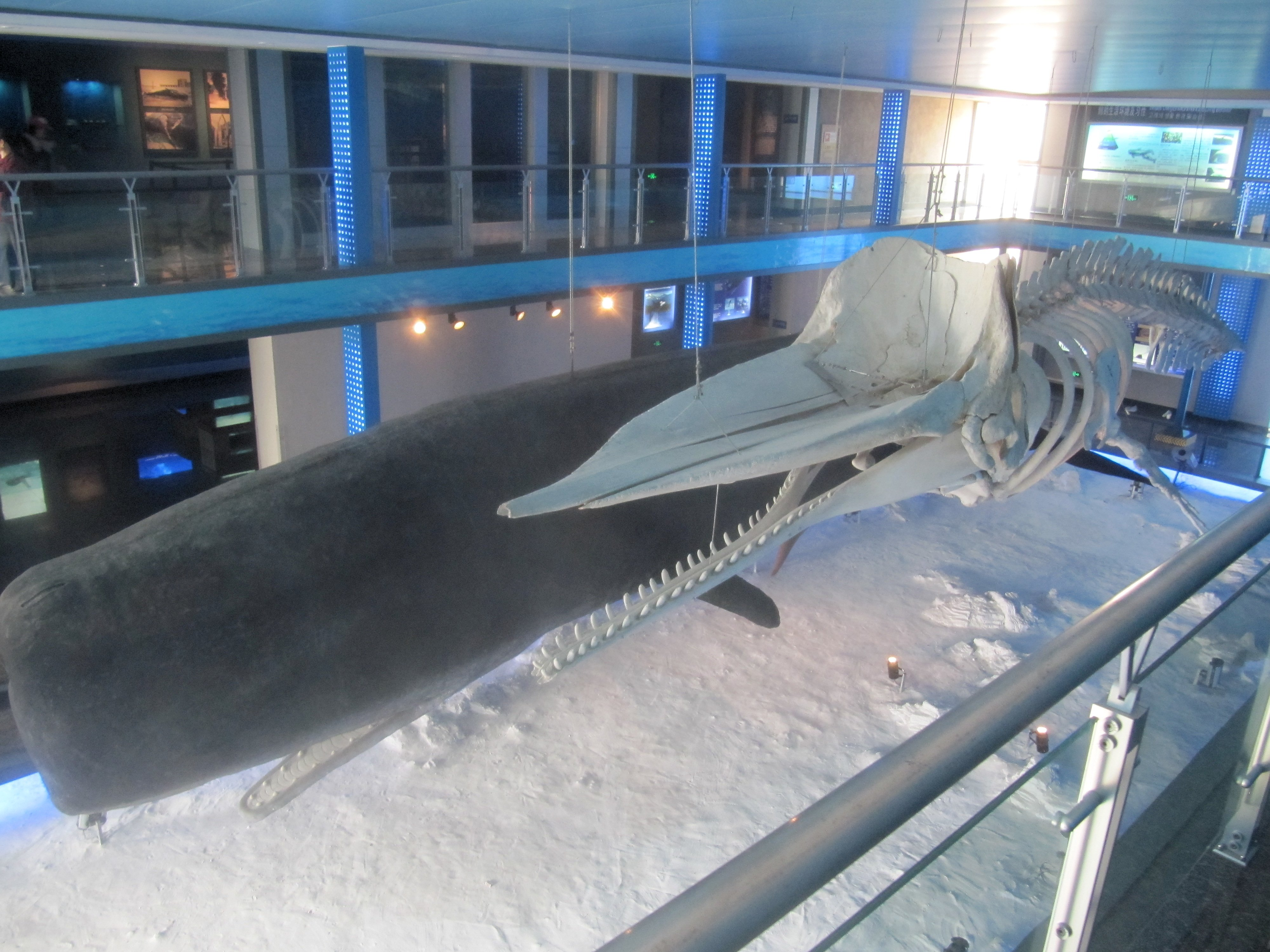
Skeleton of a sperm whale which was stranded on Liugong Island

- Sperm whales – The only large cetacean still common in the nation's waters were one of the main targets of whale-watching industries along the east coast of Taiwan, as well as islands such as the Xiaoliuqiu and Spratly Islands. Occasionally whales strand on mainland shores in the Yellow and Bohai regions. They appear seldom in near-shore waters because they feed mostly in deep sea canyons. Sperm whales appear in near-shore waters in some cases; at locations where deep waters approach shores, or some particular individuals or groups have learned to come to rest in shallow bays, straits or along beaches. There were sightings of nine whales in the East China Sea off the Korean Peninsula in 1999, and eight whales off the eastern Korean Peninsula in 2004. The last catches were of five whales off Ulsan in 1911.
- Baird's beaked whales – The second largest of the Odontoceti are extreme divers second only to sperm whales. Next to nothing about this species' natural history and biology in Chinese waters is clear as the species has been considered not to occur, and the origin of the skeleton at the Zhejiang Museum of natural History is unclear. This species could still be within the Chinese EEZ as some groups on the Japanese archipelago survive, but are under serious danger from commercial whaling. Based on archeological reports, these elusive, friendly whales once were regular among the Yellow and Bohai seas notably around Lingshan Island off Huangdao District or the mouth of Jiaozhou Bay and off Dalian at least until the mid-16th century, but they were seemingly wiped out by Japanese whalers. Southern limits of their distributions in Chinese waters are unclear while a stranding or a catch was recorded in Zhoushan in the 1950s. Twelve whales were caught as bycatch along the eastern Korean Peninsula between 1996 and 2012.
- Longman's beaked whales and other beaked whales – Being one of newly classified and less known species, their overall distributions have been rather unclear. They are the second largest of beaked whales and third largest of toothed whales that can be seen in the Chinese EEZ. In Chinese waters records of these whales are concentrated on the east coast of Taiwan and surrounding waters including Lanyu and Green Island. Based on studies, presences of other beaked whales, being lesser known as well, have been confirmed to be common around Taiwanese waters, and Taiwan is one of few locations where beaked whales have been observed with regularity during whale watching tours. Stejneger's beaked whales are resident in the Sea of Japan, and are one of the most commonly recorded Ziphiidae species of the Korean Peninsula although their presence within the Yellow Sea is unclear.
- Orcas – The current status of killer whales along the nation's coasts and surrounding areas is unclear. Sightings are more common along the eastern Taiwanese coasts such as off Chenggong while on the mainland, they occur on almost the entire shoreline from the Bohai and Yellow Sea in the north to Ningbo and Zhoushan Archipelago in the east, and along the southern coasts and islands including Paracel Islands as well. There was a commercial catch newar southern Taiwan in the 1990s. They still occur occasionally in the Korean side of the Yellow Sea or nearby; there was a sighting of pairs in 2001 and five or six whales off Wando (island) within the Dadohaehaesang National Park in 2016.
- Short-finned pilot whales – The so-called the "Southern Form" of the species ranges within the Chinese waters. Most of records concentrate on the eastern coasts of Taiwan. Mainland distributions are rather unclear as there had been only one stranding record in Hainan, including regularities of occurrences within the Yellow Sea, but occasional strandings have been recorded such as at Taeanhaean National Park and Jeju. There was a mass stranding on the Nanji Islands in 2004.
- False killer whales – One of few species surviving today in descent numbers on mainland coasts, but in peril; any warmer regions such as Taiwan, Nánpēng Islands, Nanji Island Marine Sanctuary, Matsu Islands, Langyatai on Huangdao District, Dongshan County, Hong Kong, Paracel Islands, and so on.
  - False killer whales along continental China are known to often enter and swim up large rivers in pods or large numbered schools, reaching more than 30 to 50 km, or individuals have traveled 220 to 300 km. Rivers and canals in Xiangshui County such as Guanhe, Jiangsu, Huai, and Tongyu (通榆河) rivers have local legends of "鲸拜龙王" (Worshiped Whale Dragon King), telling that every spring whales gather at river mouths and swim up. In recent years, especially from earlier 2000s, false killer whales have been observed to swim up rivers rather regularly, showing dramatic recoveries and their numbers are rising once again, up to more than 200 whales. Whales occasionally appear in Jiaozhou Bay which was part of the regular range for the species until in the 1980s.

=== Dugongs ===
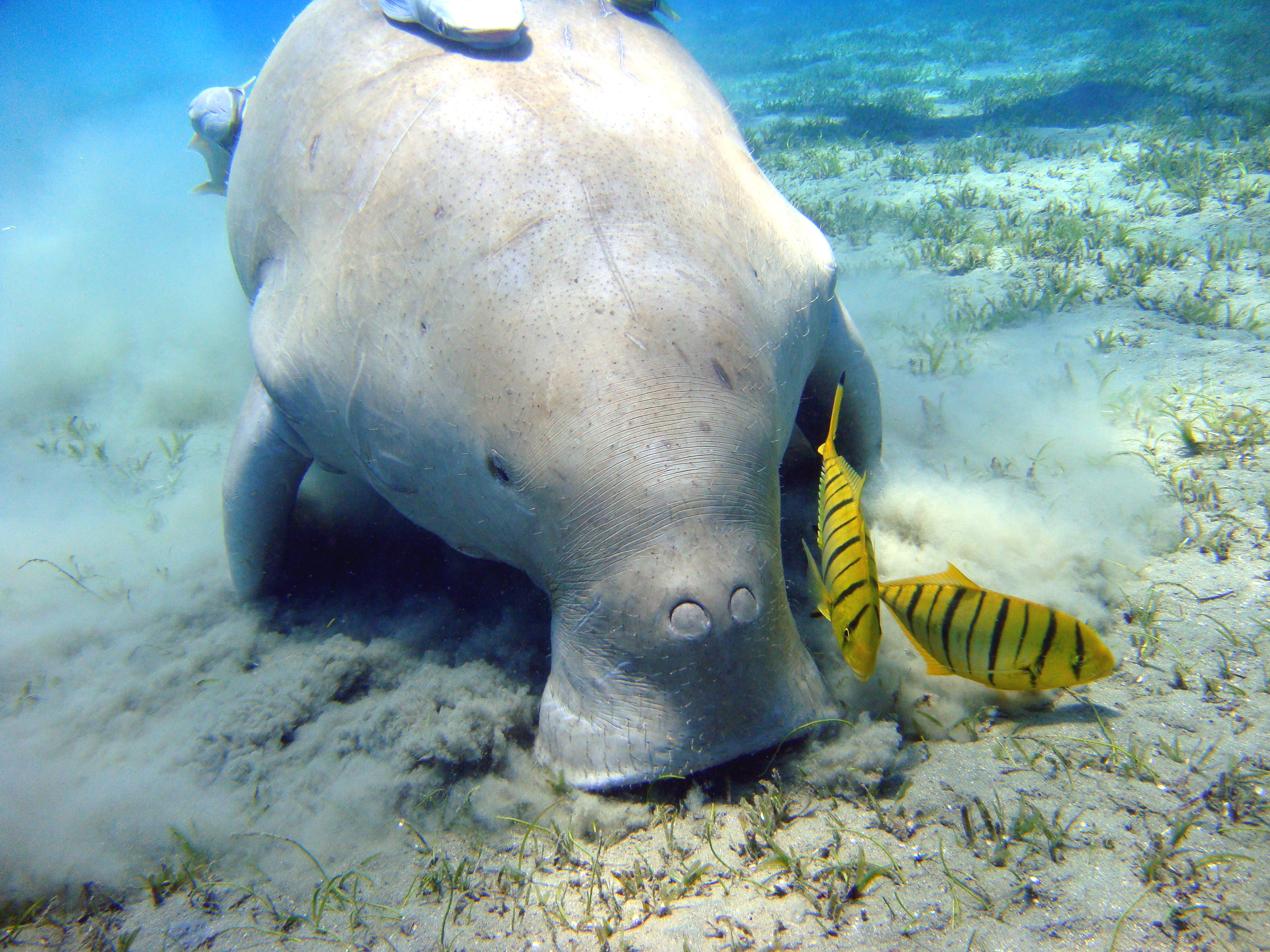
A dugong

Dugongs are marine mammals that feed entirely on vegetation such as seagrass. They are related to manatees in the Western Hemisphere, and are only sirenian species found in Asian waters. In China, dugongs are found along the coasts of the Guangxi Zhuang Autonomous Region, where the Hepu Dugong National Nature Reserve, near Beihai, was created in 1992 for their protection, and less frequently in Hainan. Current distributions could be much more restricted than that of pre-exploitation ranges, as once might have been seen in the Yellow sea regions.

They are considered regionally extinct in Taiwan. The dugong is a Class I protected species. They were hunted for their meat in the late 1950s and early 1960s during the Great Leap Forward. Dugongs are threatened by the loss of seagrass beds from coastal development. Several areas still possess feasible habitats for dugongs today such as the Dongsha Atoll and the west coasts of Hainan and Leizhou Peninsula, and Chinese government funded to establish a sanctuary designed for dugong and mangrove conservation ranging from Hepu County to Shankou in Guanxi, also to secure local Chinese white dolphins. Individuals distributed among the Beibu Gulf Economic Rim in Gulf of Tonkin face threats of busy-becoming ship-lanes and polluted waters.

=== Elephant ===
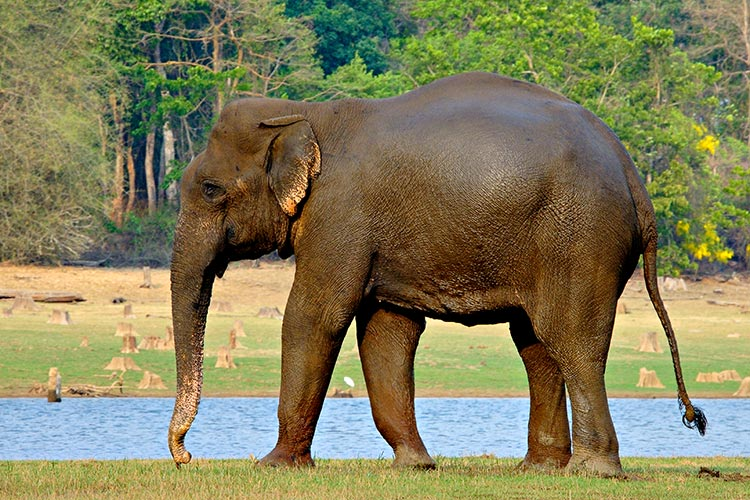
An Asian elephant

Asian elephants once roamed a large swath of China, but are now confined to the Xishuangbanna and Pu'er Prefectures of southern Yunnan. Xishuangbana means 12 elephants in the local Thai language. In recent years, Chinese demand for ivory has led to a sharp increase in elephant poaching around the world. Due to strict enforcement of elephant protection laws with capital punishment for poachers and government financed feeding programs, the population of elephants within China from 1994 to 2014 roughly doubled to nearly 300.

=== Odd-toed ungulates ===
==== Rhino ====
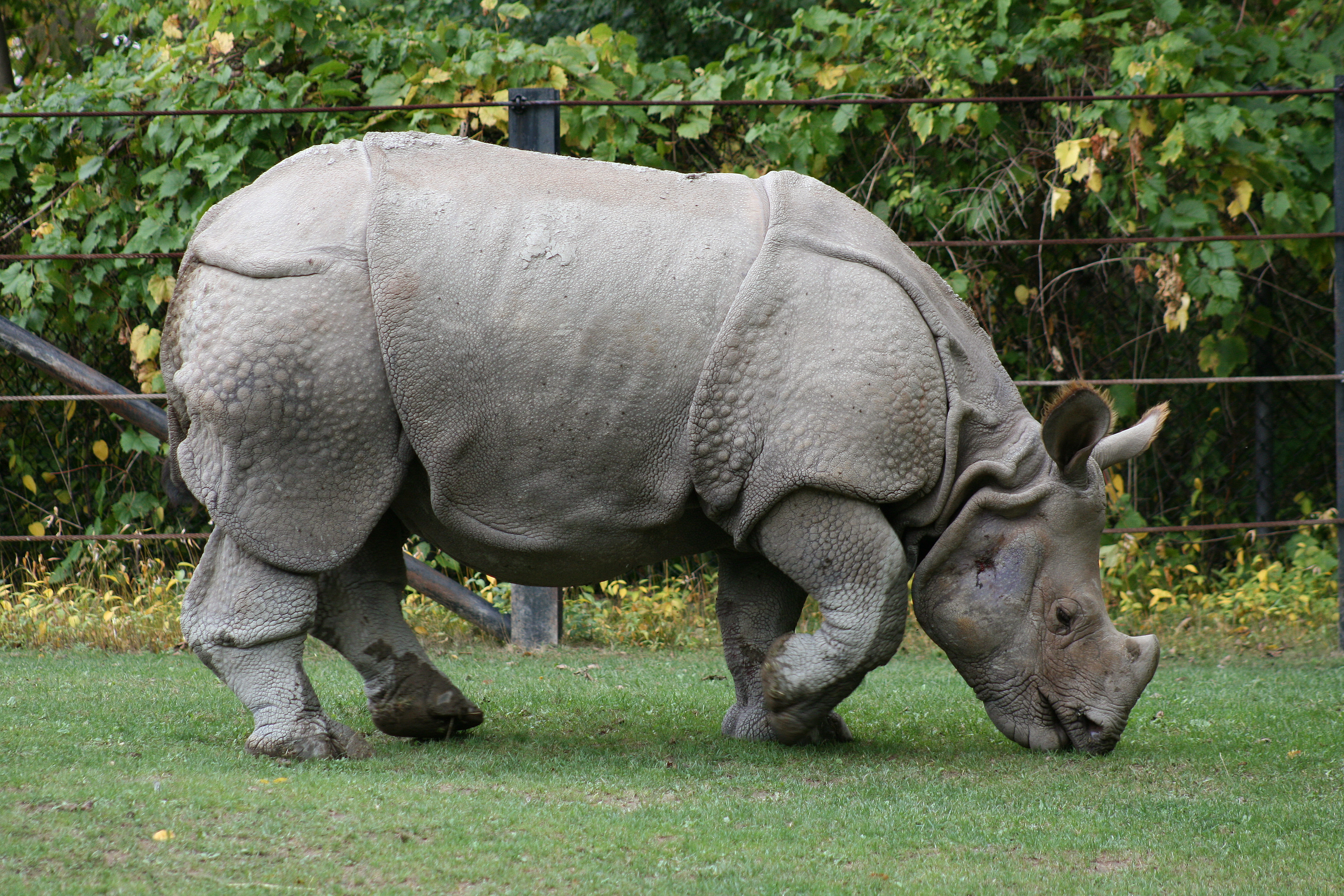
Indian rhinoceros, extinct in China since 1920

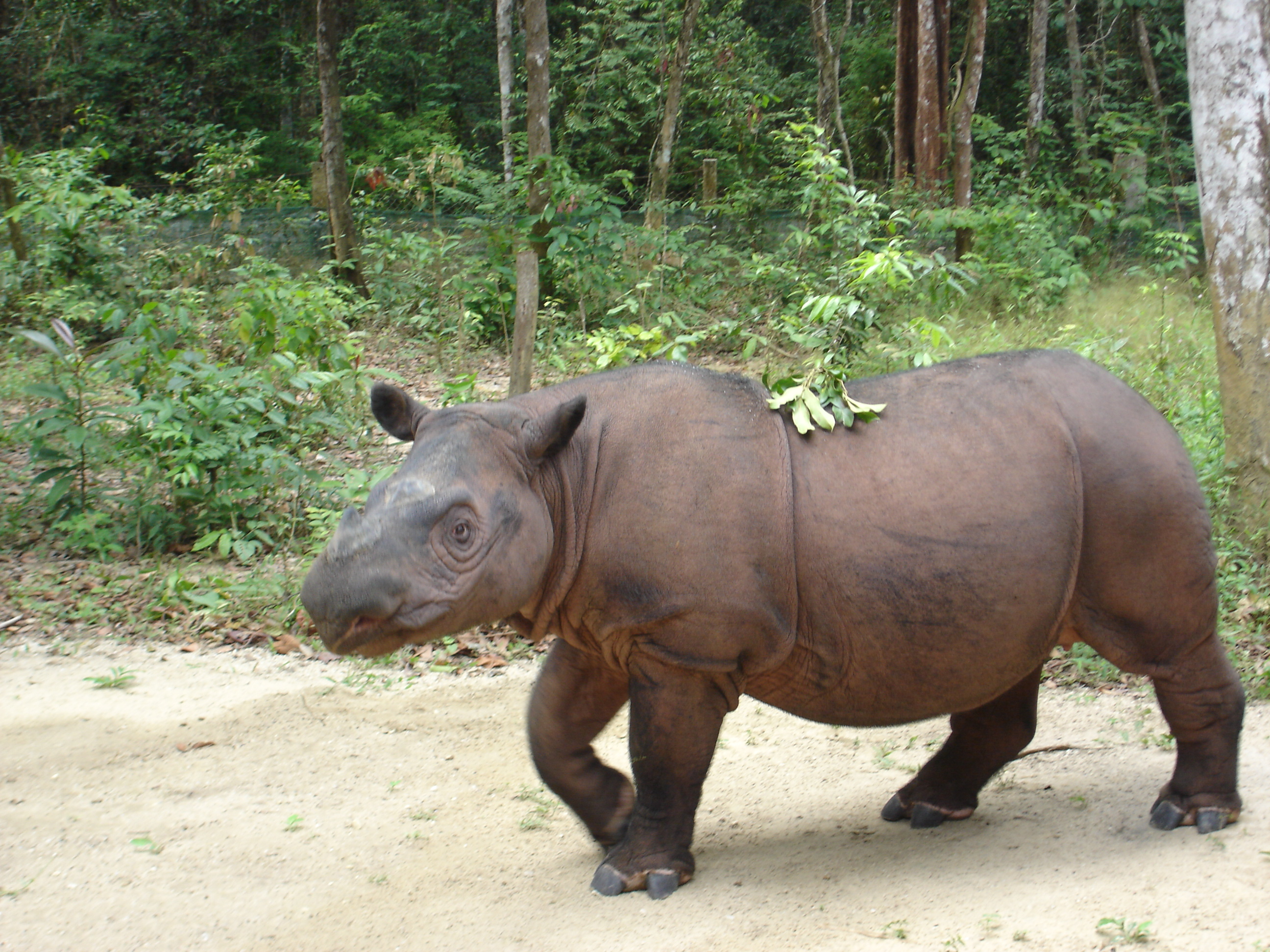
Sumatran rhinoceros, extinct in China since 1916

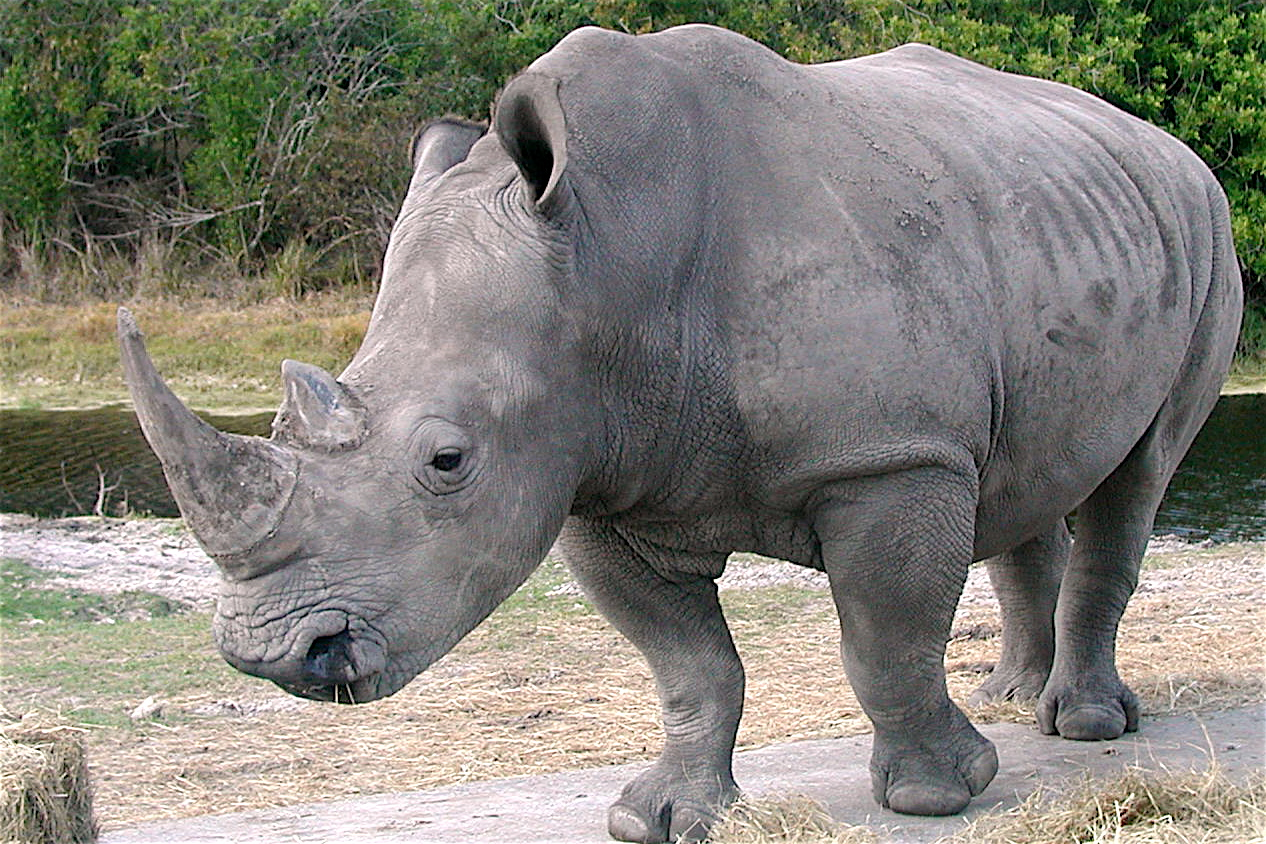
Southern white rhinoceros introduced into the wild in 2014

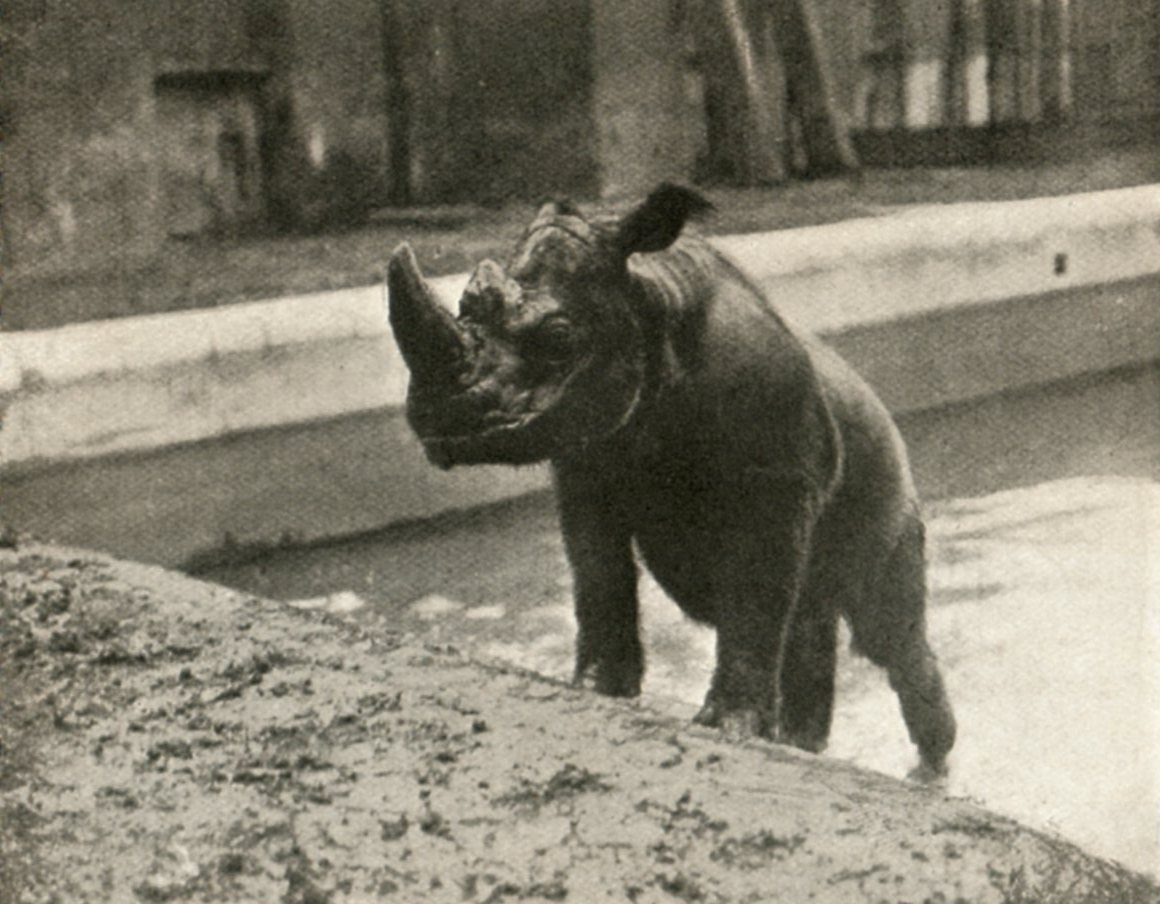
Northern Sumatran rhinoceros, declared extinct on several occasions in the 20th century

Records and artwork from antiquity indicate that three species of Asian rhinoceros, the Indian, Javan and Sumatran, more specially the Northern Sumatran rhinoceros have lived in China. During the Shang dynasty, some 3,000 years ago, rhinoceros ranged as far north as Inner Mongolia. By the beginning of the Han dynasty, 2,200 years ago, they had disappeared from the Central Plains of northern China.

During the Tang dynasty, about 1,200 years ago, rhinos were found across southern China and the imperial zoo had a captive breeding program that returned some animals to the wild. Cooler climate in northern China may have caused rhinoceros habitat to shrink, but it was demand for rhino horns for use in traditional Chinese medicine, documented in as early as the Song dynasty 1,000 years ago, that drove the animal toward extinction.

In the Ming dynasty about 650 years ago, rhinoceros were confined to Yunnan and Guizhou, and by the Qing dynasty to only Yunnan. The Qing government limited the hunting of rhinos to only officials, and some 300 horns were harvested between 1900 and 1910. The collapse of the Qing dynasty in 1911 allowed individuals to hunt the animal. The last Sumatran rhino was killed in 1916, the last Indian rhino in 1920 and the last Javan rhino in 1922.

In 2010, a herd of nine southern white rhinoceros were imported from South Africa and shipped to Yunnan, where they were kept in a wild animal park for acclimation. In March 2013, seven of the animals were shipped to the Laiyanghe National Forest Park, a habitat where Asian rhinoceros once lived. Two of the African rhinos began the process of being released into the wild on 13 May 2014.

==== Horses and wild asses ====
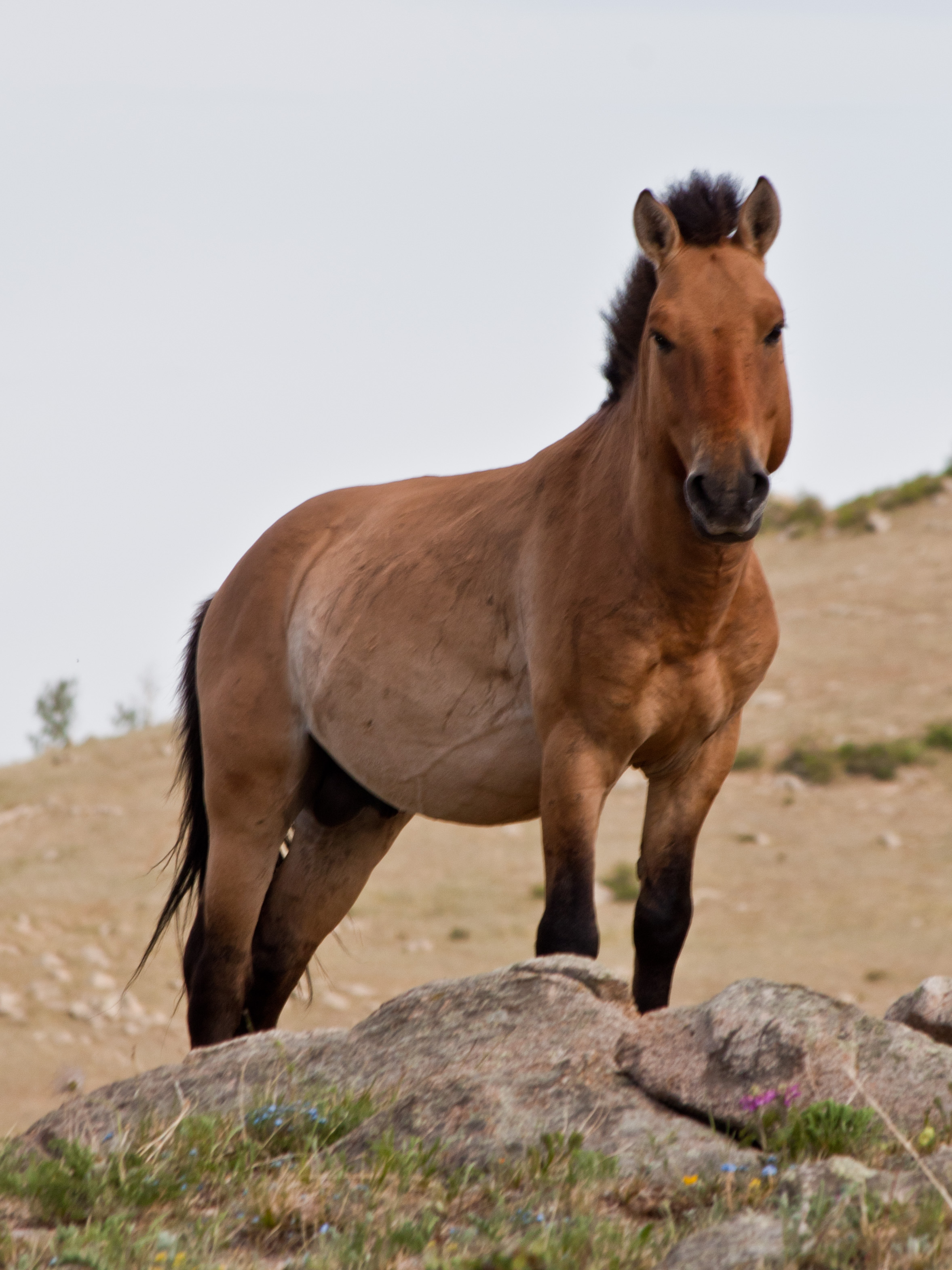
Przewalski's horse

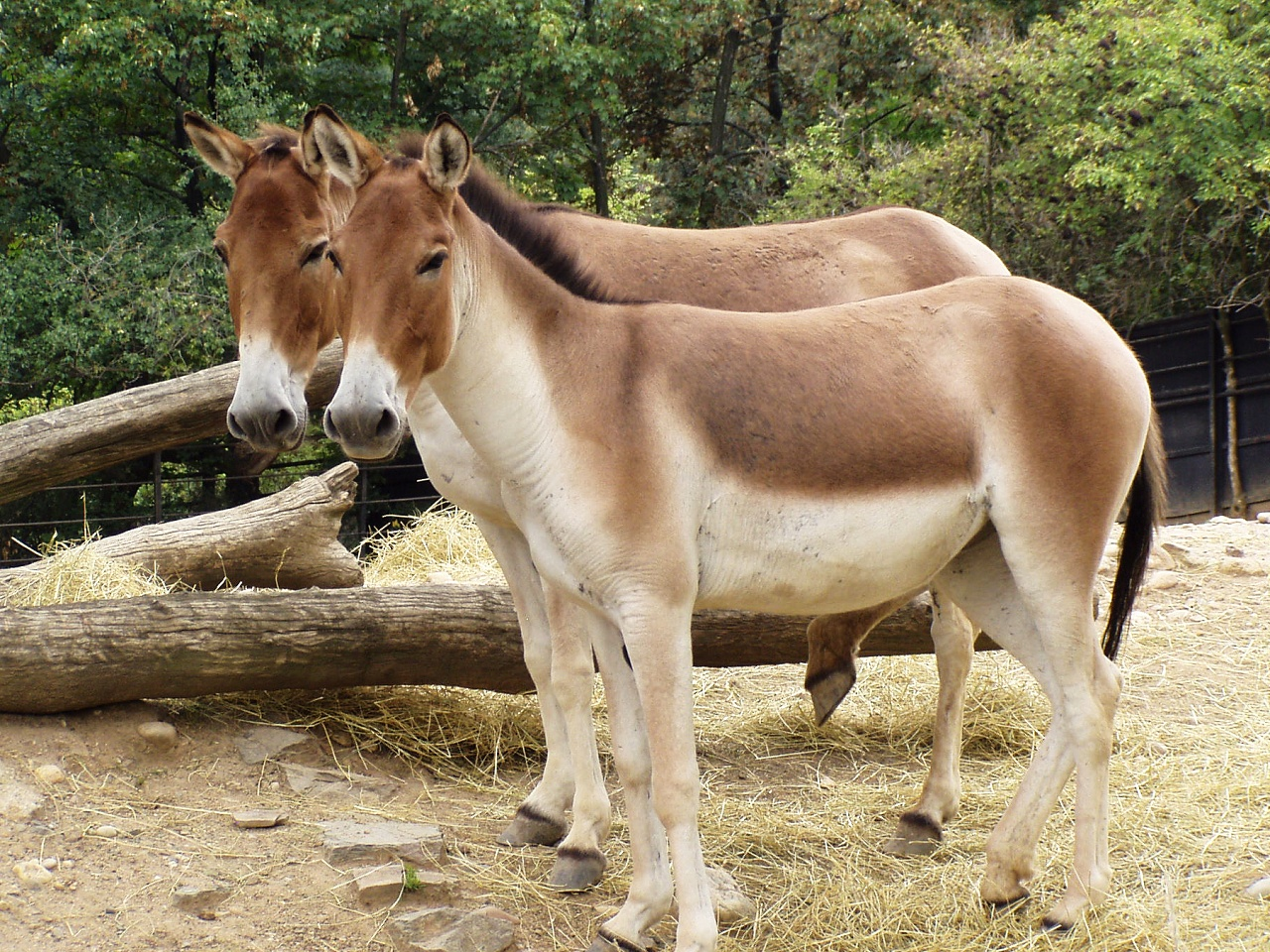
Asiatic wild ass (kiang)

The Przewalski's horse, the only species of wild horses never to have been domesticated, once roamed free in large parts of northwestern China but became locally extinct in 1957. In the 1980s, herds from Europe have been introduced to habitats in Xinjiang and Gansu.

The other odd-toed ungulates in China are the Mongolian wild ass and the Tibetan wild ass (kiang). The former is endangered while the latter is not. Both are Class I protected species.

=== Even-toed ungulates ===
==== Deer ====
China has a great variety of true deer and its close kin the musk deer. The largest deer species, the elk (known as the moose in North America), is found in the Greater and Lesser Khingan ranges of the northeast. The moose stands at 2 m tall and weighs as much 700 kg. In contrast, the lesser mouse-deer of Yunnan, which is just 45 cm in height and weighs 2 kg, is not much bigger than a rabbit.

China also contains the closely related elk and red deer, the second and fourth largest deer species, which until 2004 were considered the same species. The elk (also known as wapiti) has four subspecies in Asia – the Altai wapiti, Tian Shan wapiti, Manchurian wapiti and Alashan wapiti – all of which are present in China. The red deer, though quite common in Europe, has subspecies in China that are endangered. The red deer are the deer that have been most important to human societies.

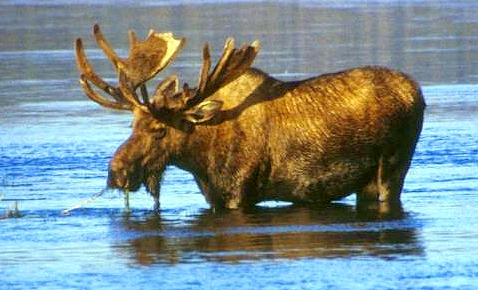
Elk

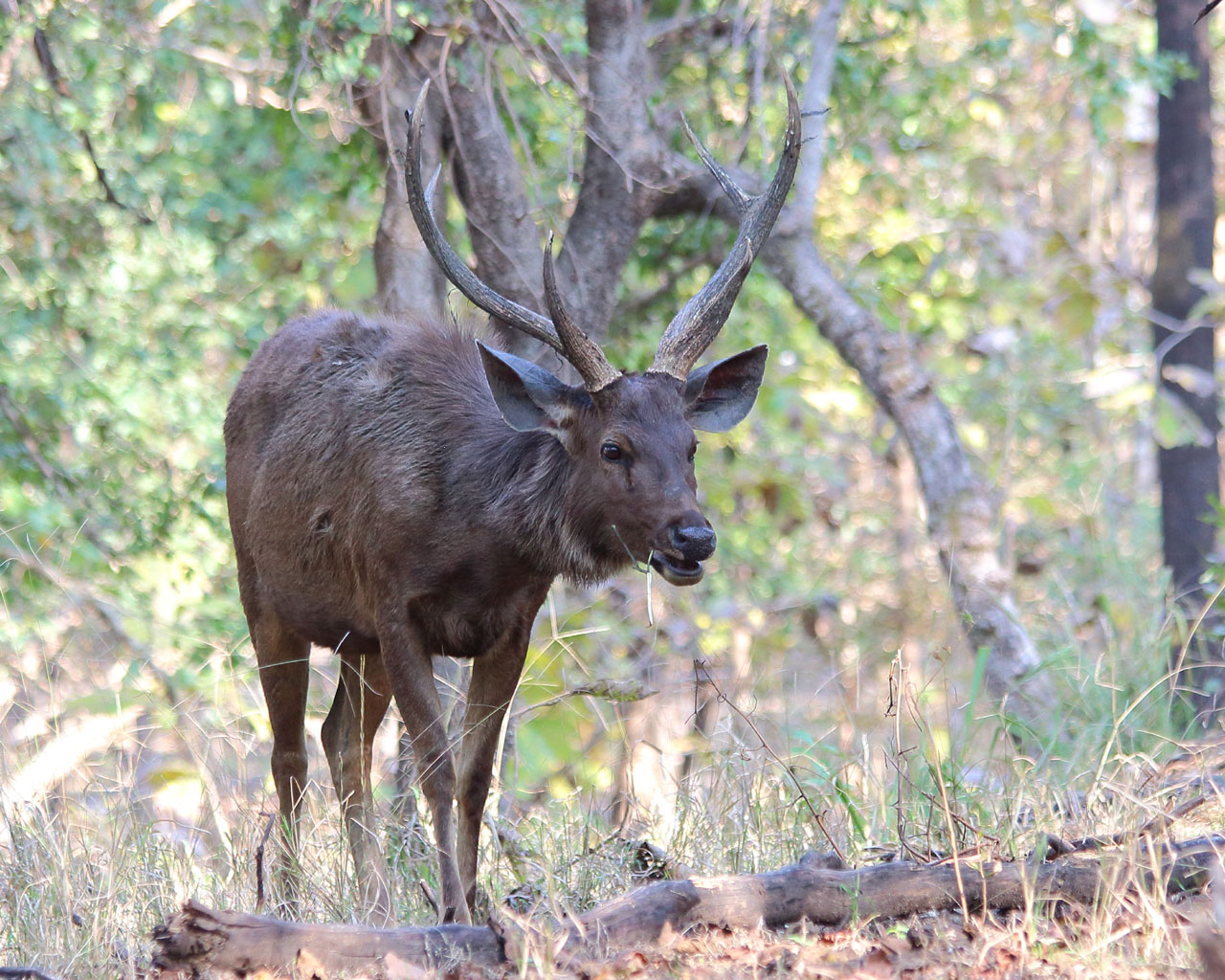
Sambar

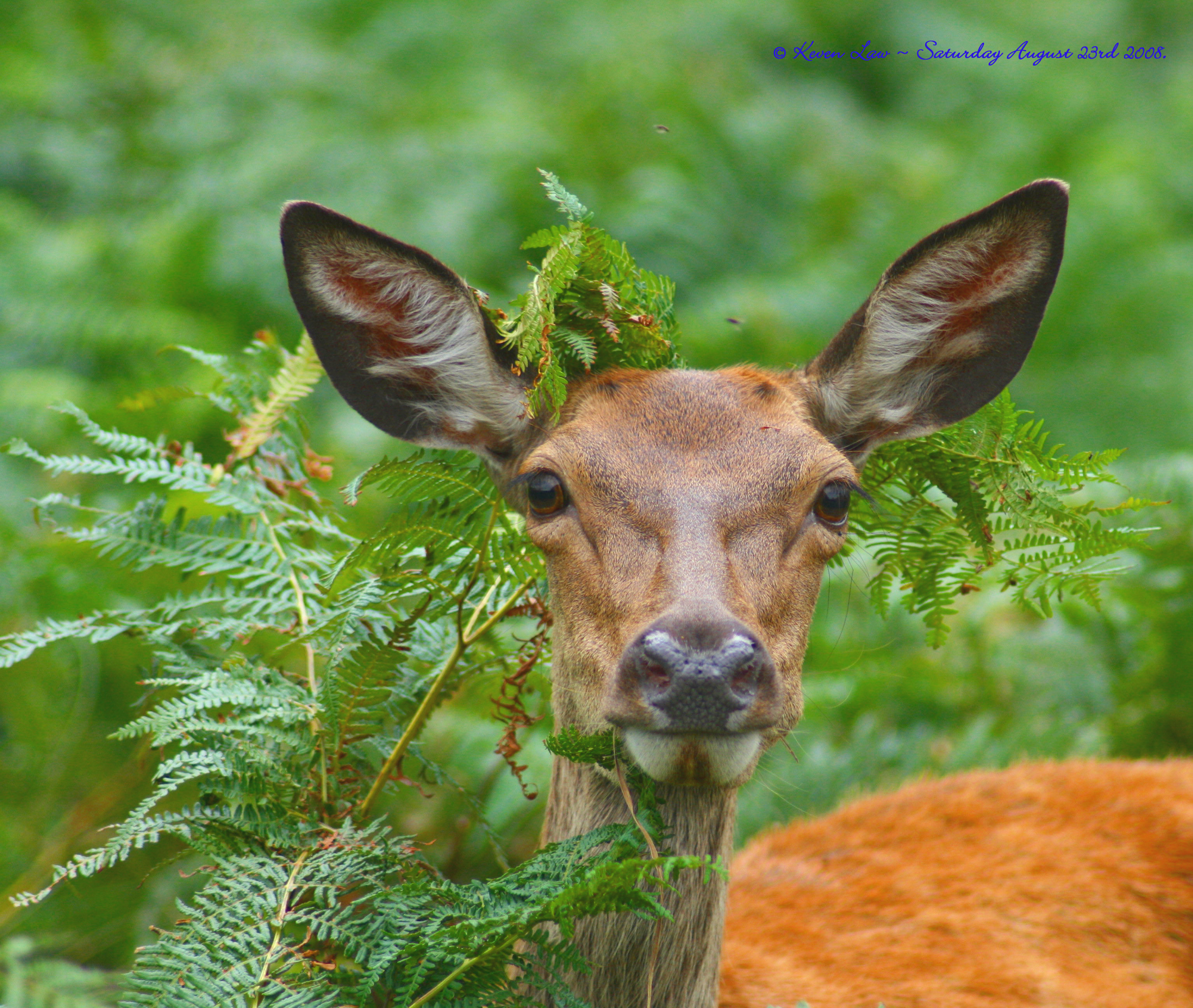
Red deer

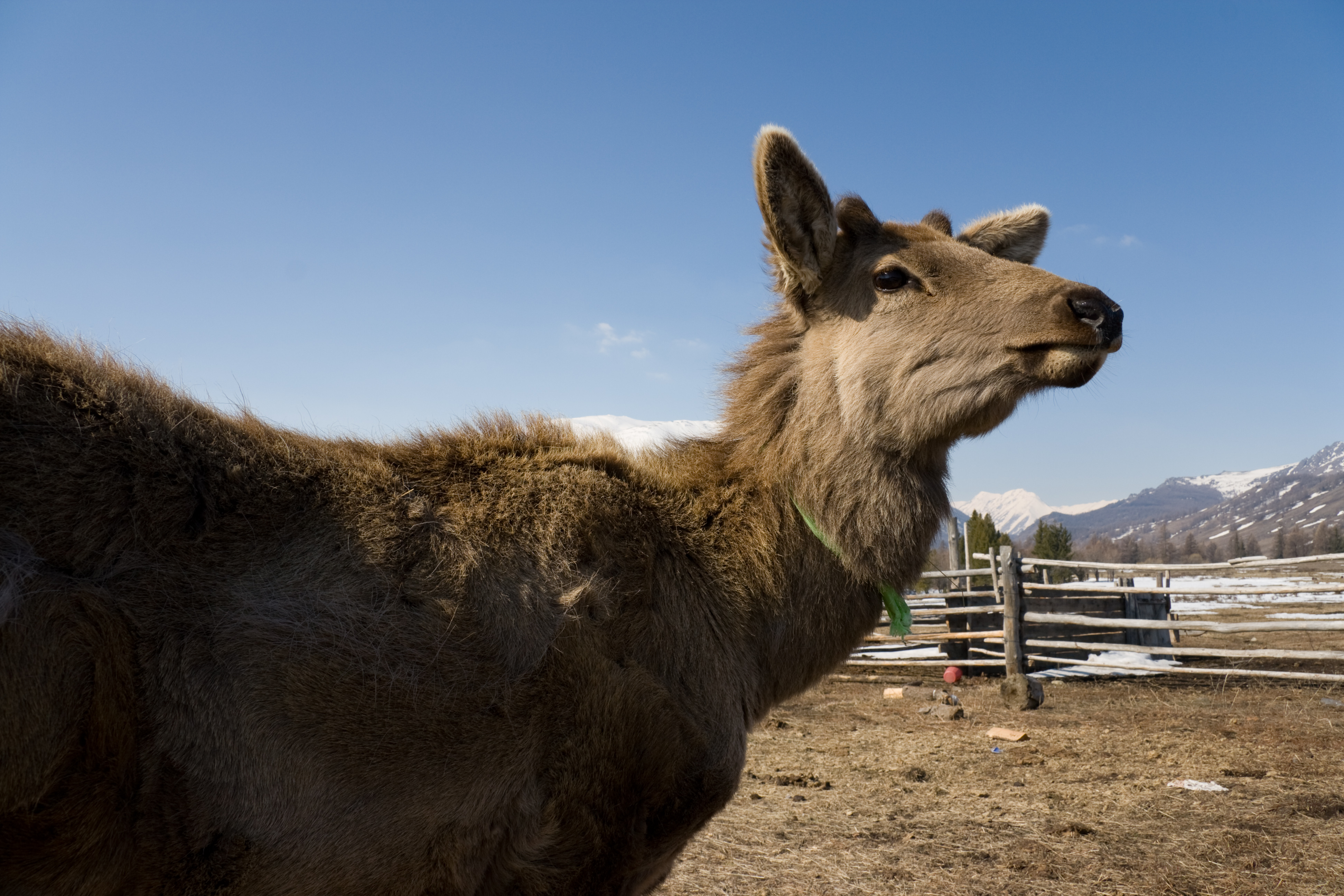
Altai wapiti

The Yarkand deer lives along the Tarim River in Xinjiang south of the Tian Shan. The Bactrian deer lives north of the Tian Shan in northern Xinjiang and Central Asian Republics. The Tibetan red deer, Gansu red deer, Sichuan deer have been alternatively categorized as subspecies of the elk or the Central Asian red deer.

The sambar deer, the third largest deer species, is found throughout southern China, and on the islands of Hainan and Taiwan. They live near water and are called "water deer" in Chinese. They are not to be confused with the Chinese water deer, a smaller deer which are found in the Yangtze Delta region. The water deer is the only species of true deer without antlers.

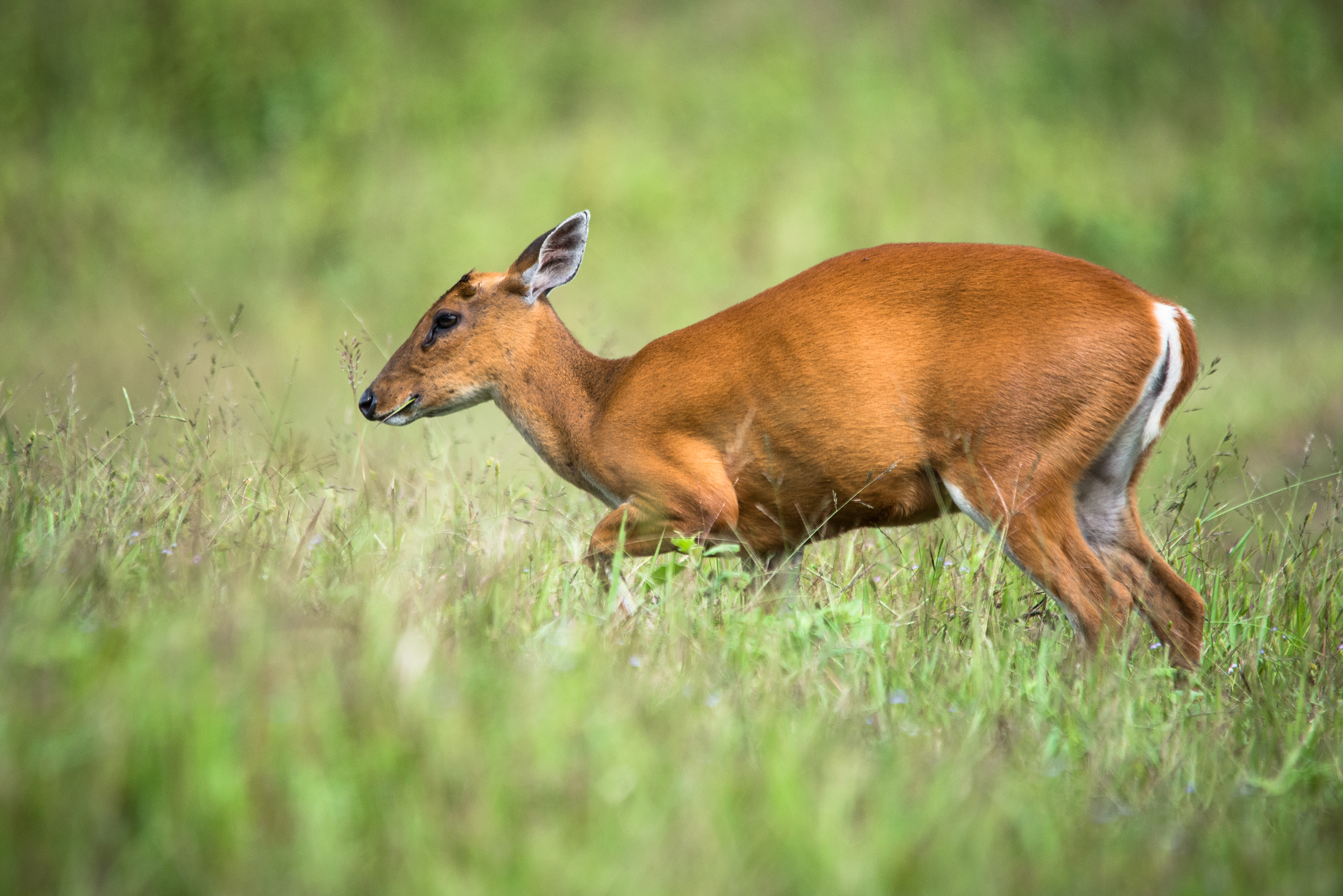
Indian or common muntjac

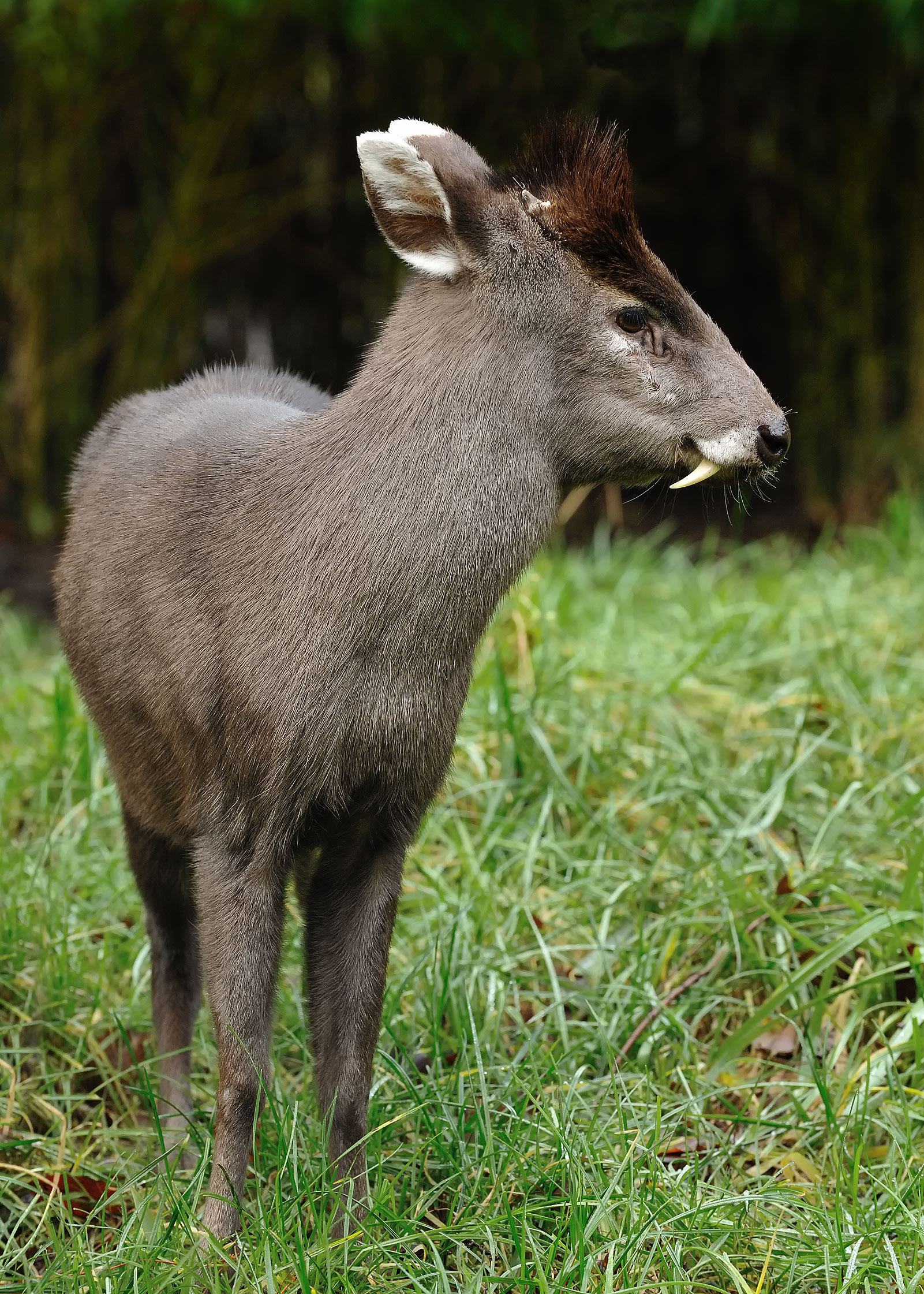
Tufted deer

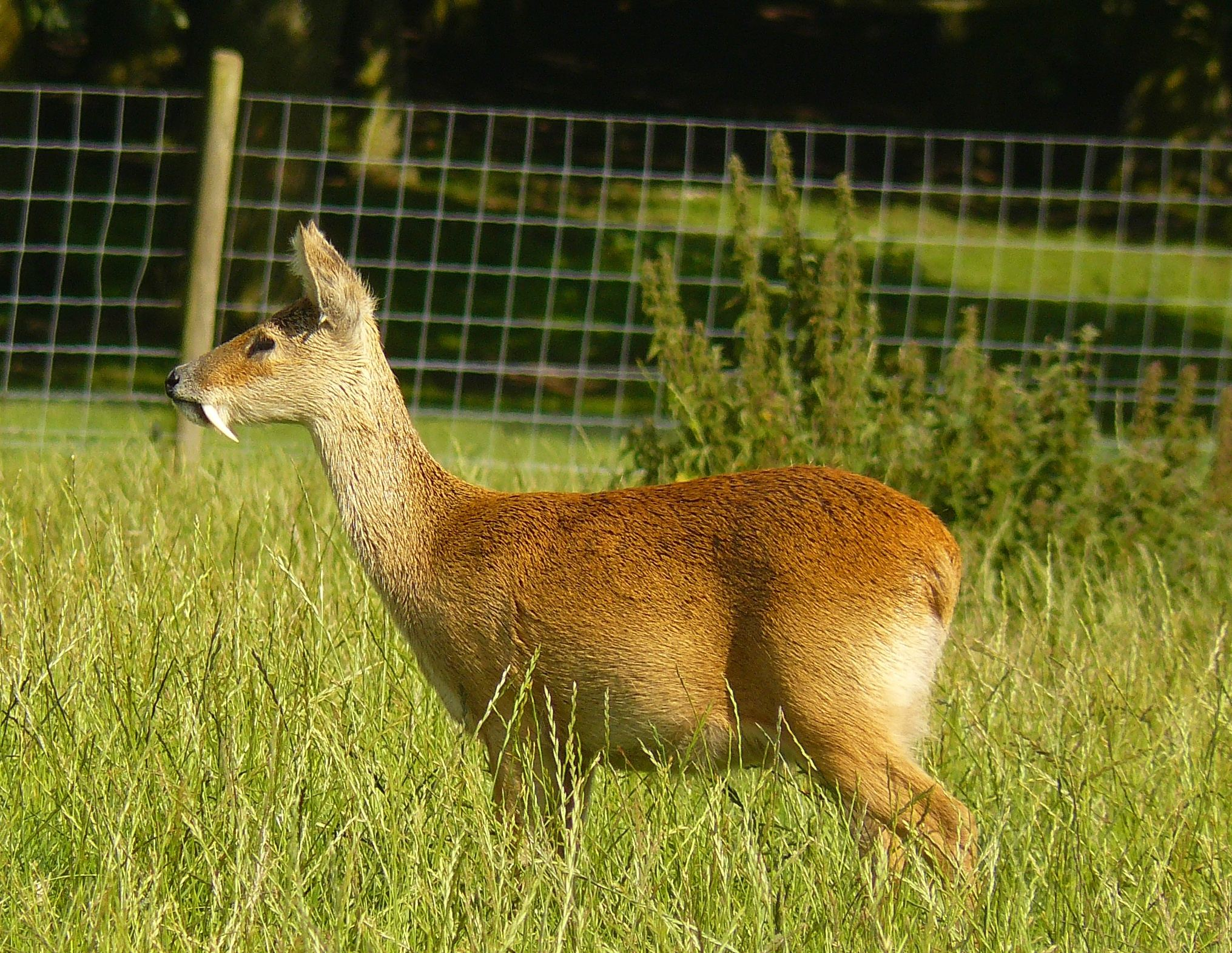
Chinese water deer

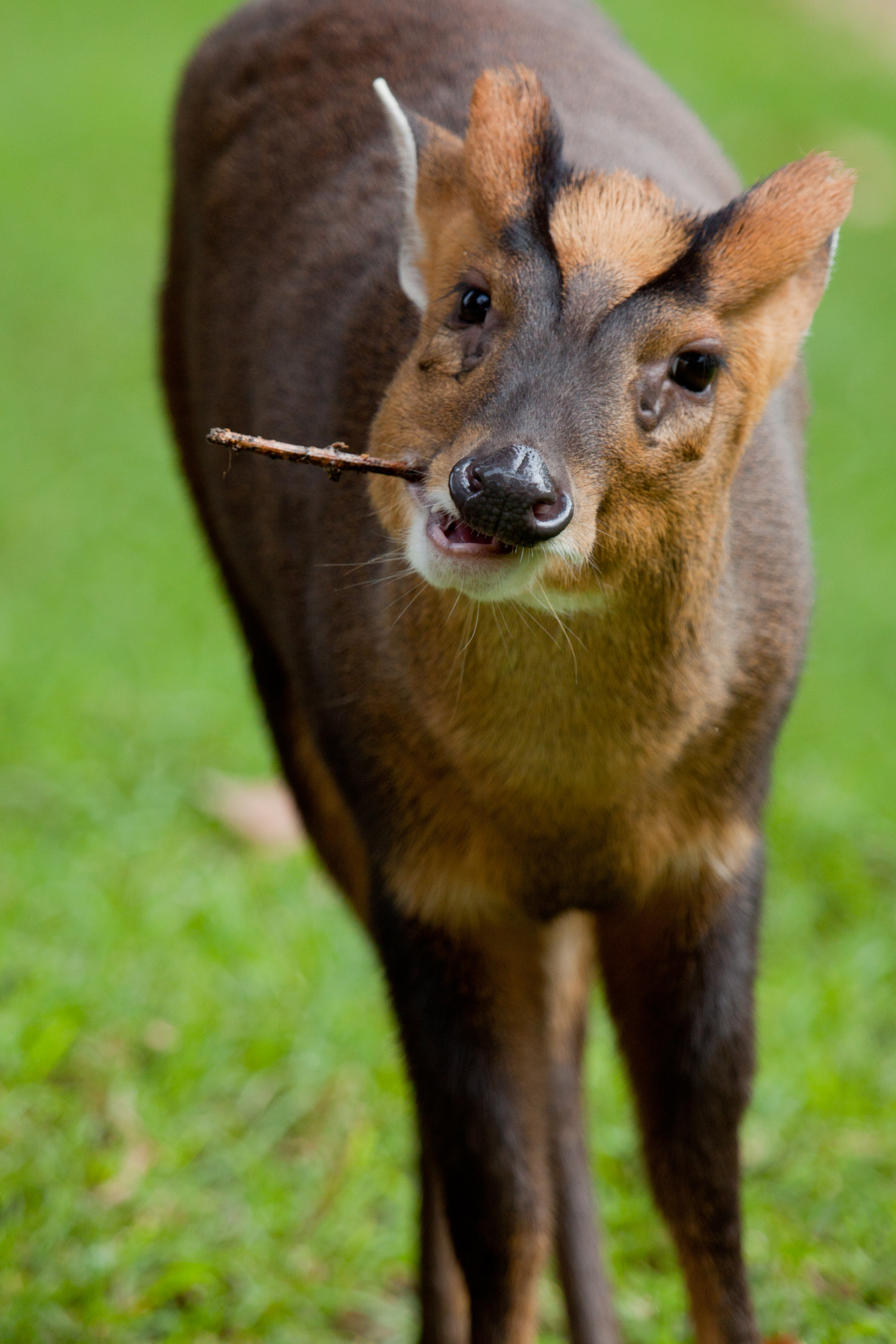
Reeve's muntjac

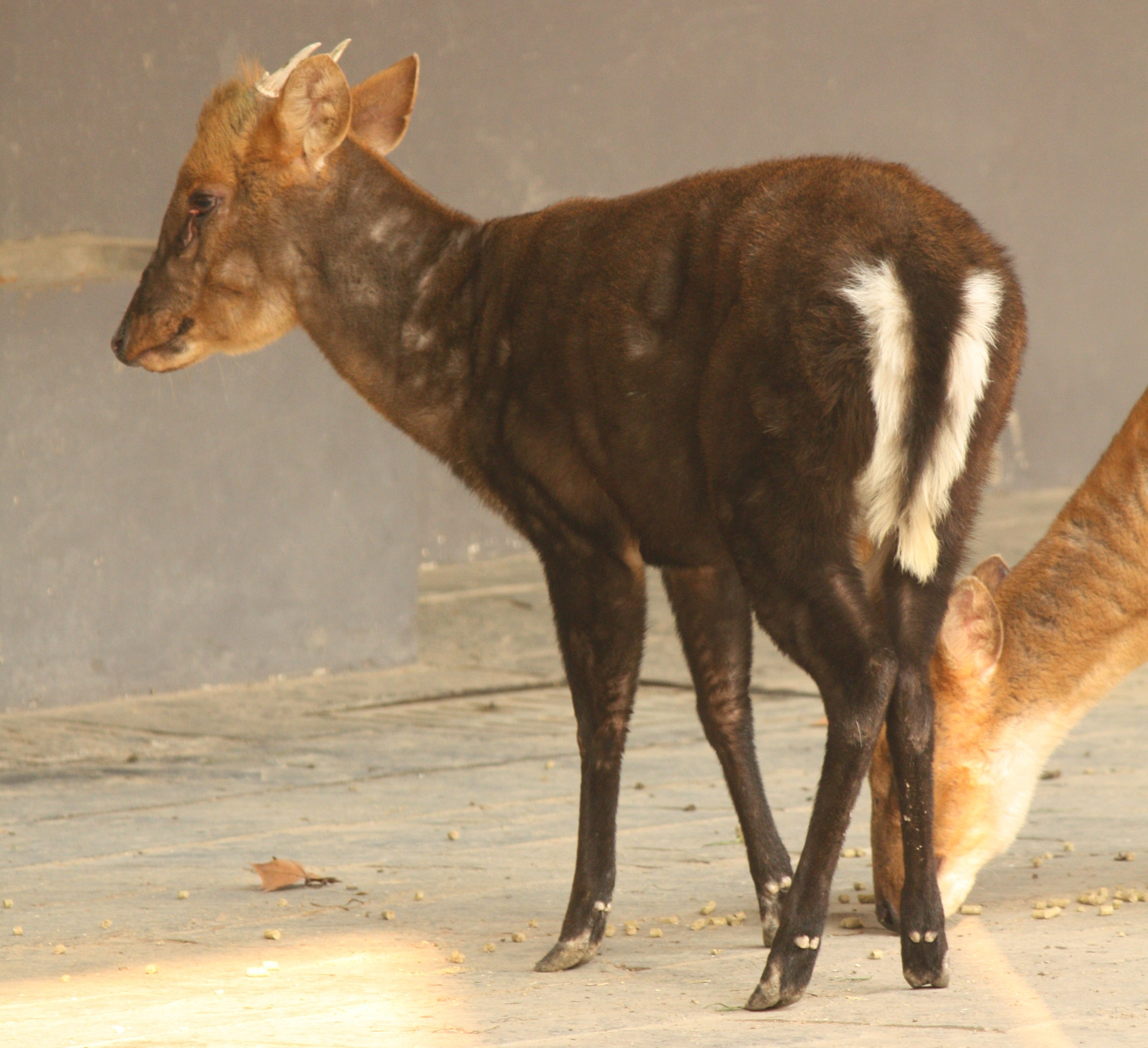
Hairy-fronted muntjac or black muntjac

Water deer, tufted deer and muntjacs are small deer with long upper canines that protrude like tusks. Muntjacs are known for their soft hide and tender meat. The Indian muntjac is found throughout southern China. The range of the Reeve's muntjac extends north to Gansu and to Taiwan. Fea's muntjac are found in eastern Tibet and the Gongshan muntjac in neighboring Yunnan. The hairy-fronted muntjac is endemic to the mountains at the juncture of Anhui, Zhejiang, Jiangxi and Fujian and is a protected species. The tufted deer, a close relative of the muntjac, is found throughout central China.

Deer is prized in China for the velvet of their antlers. Antler velvet is rich in growth hormone and is used in traditional Chinese medicine. The most valuable antler velvet comes from the sika deer which is raised on farms. Several subspecies of the sika deer, including the Shanxi sika and the North China sika may have become extinct in the wild and survive exclusively in captivity. The Sichuan sika deer, another subspecies, was discovered in 1978 and lives in mountains of northern Sichuan and southern Gansu. The Formosan sika deer is endemic to Taiwan.

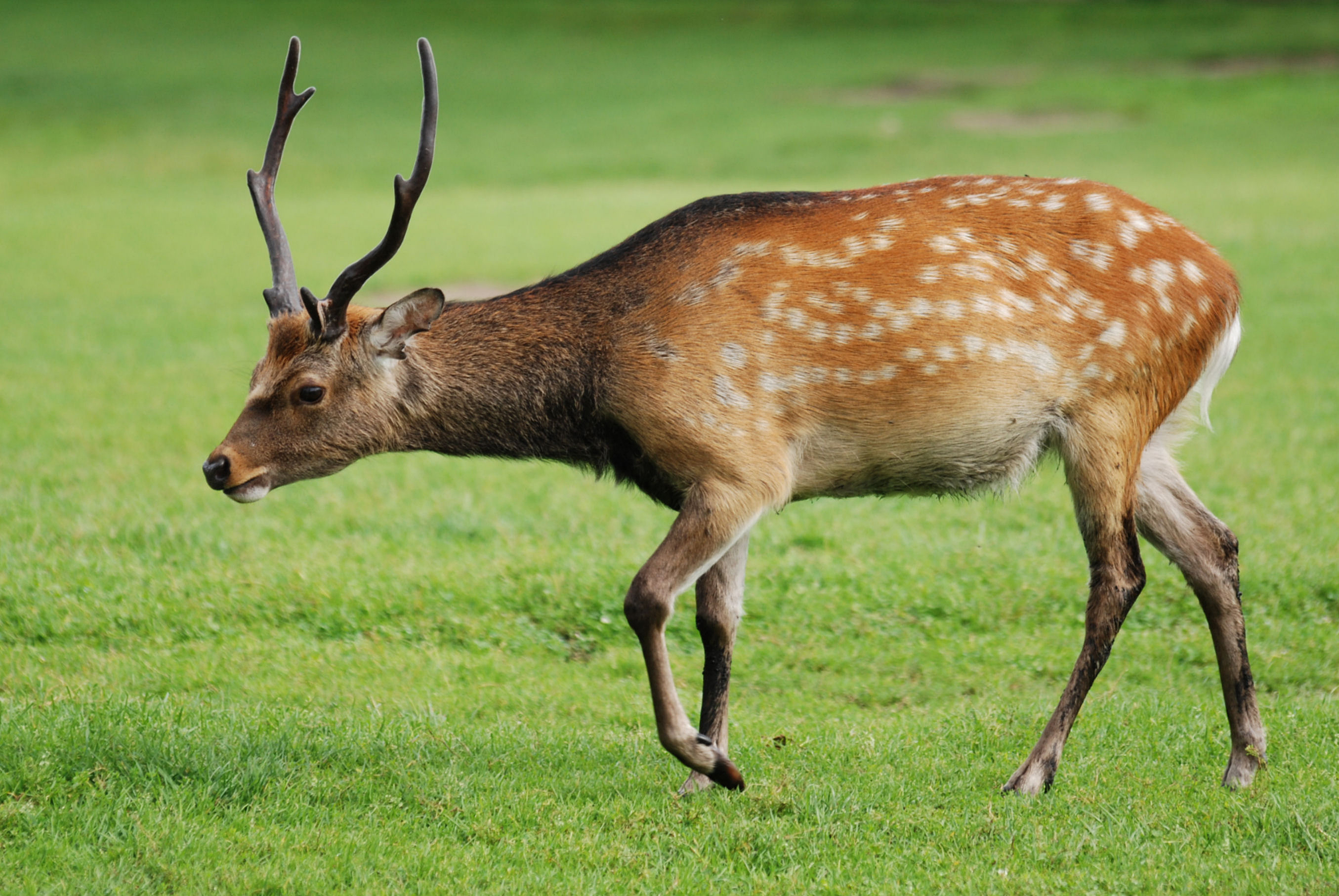
Sika deer

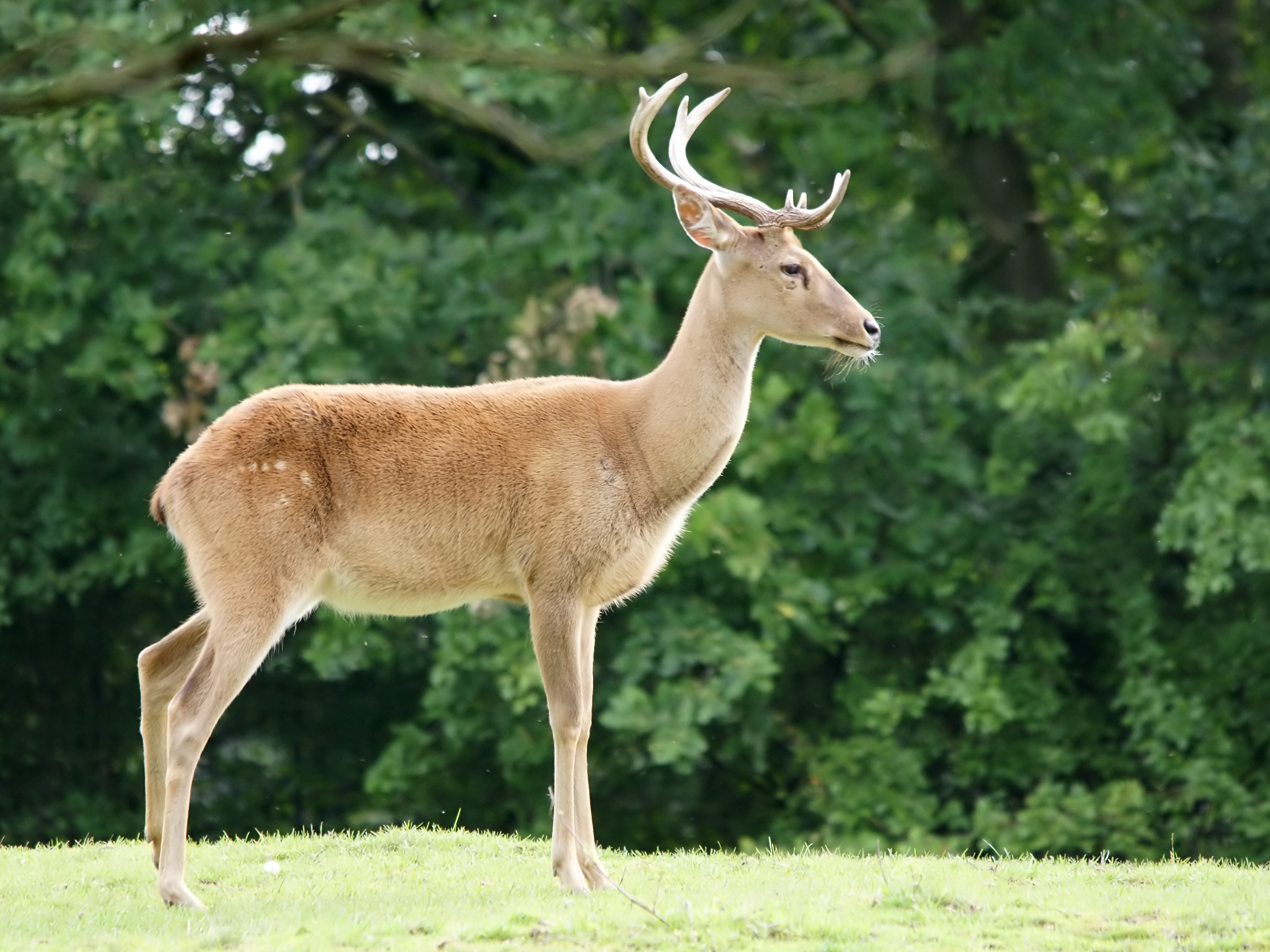
Eld's deer

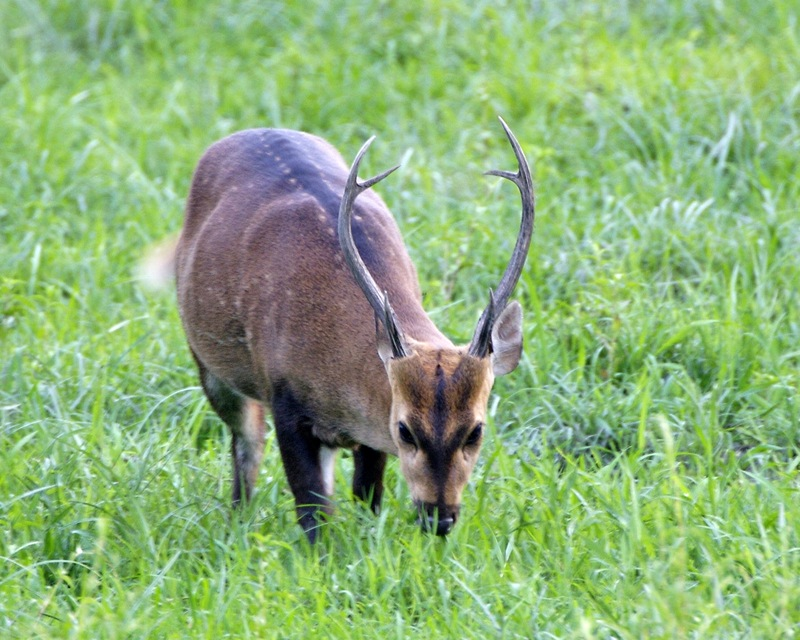
Hog deer

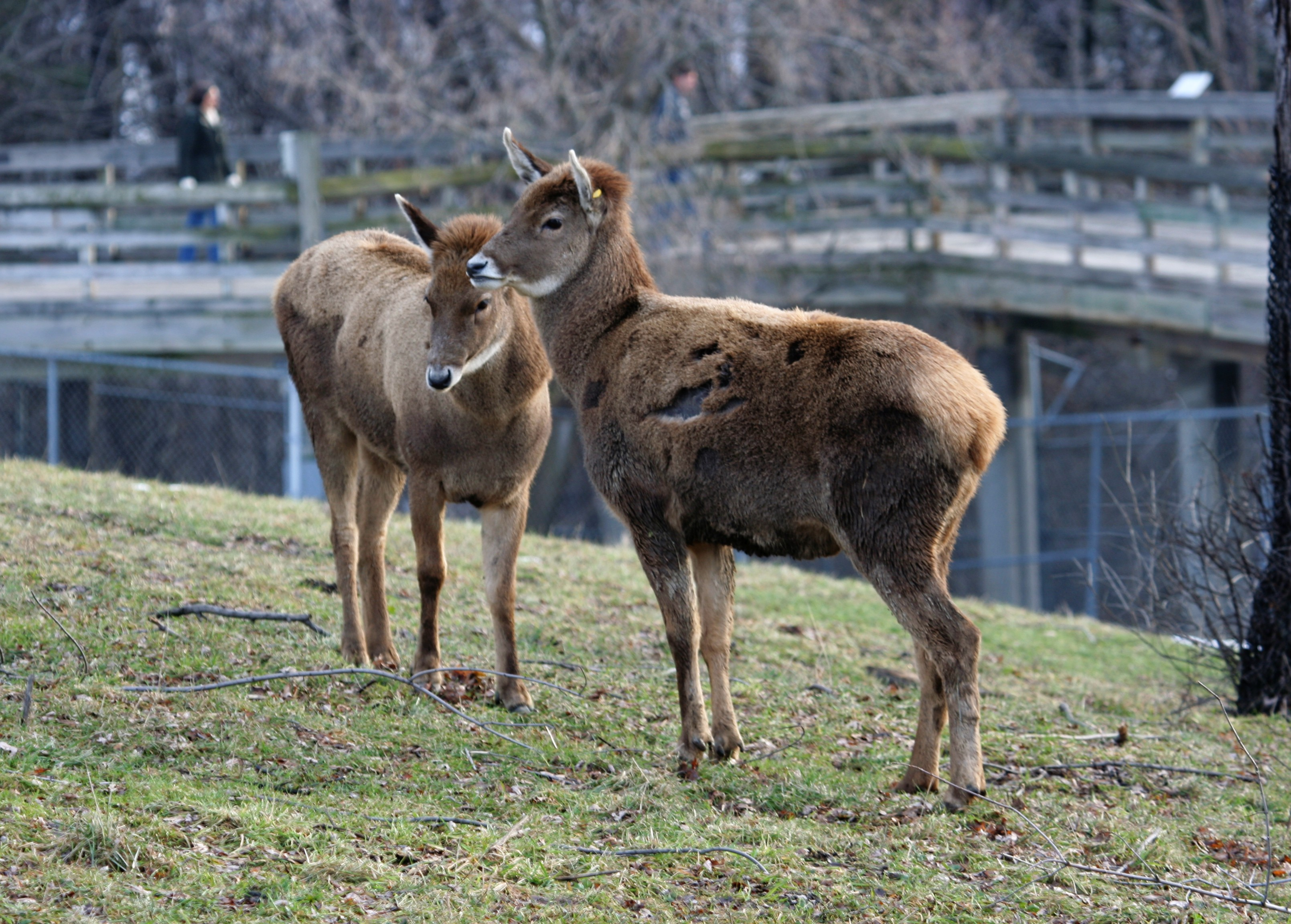
Thorold's or white-lipped deer

Reindeer, which are found in the forests of the Greater Khingan range in northern Inner Mongolia, are domesticated by the ethnic Ewenki and Oroqen people. The Oroqen call themselves, "people who use the reindeer". One branch of the Ewenki rely on reindeer to haul goods through swampy forests. They use reindeer milk and meat for nourishment, hides for clothing and tents, and antlers for medicine and income. The Kyrgyz people, who now reside in Central Asia and western Xinjiang, used to live in northeast Asia and regard the sika deer as a holy animal. According to Kyrgyz legend, the Kyrgyz Bugu tribe descended from a mother deer.

The sika deer is protected as a Class I endangered species by the state, though it is classified by the International Union for Conservation of Nature (IUCN) as least concern. Another Class I protected deer is the Thorold's or white-lipped deer. This large deer with a population of about 15,000 that is endemic to Qinghai, Gansu, Sichuan, Tibet and Yunnan, is considered vulnerable by the IUCN. The Chinese population of Eld's deer, a Class I protected species that is also considered endangered by IUCN, is found only on the island of Hainan. For decades, the Indochinese hog deer was believed to be extinct in China until a fawn was discovered in 2007 in the Yongde Daxueshan National Wildlife Reserve. The Indochinese hog deer is also protected by the state.

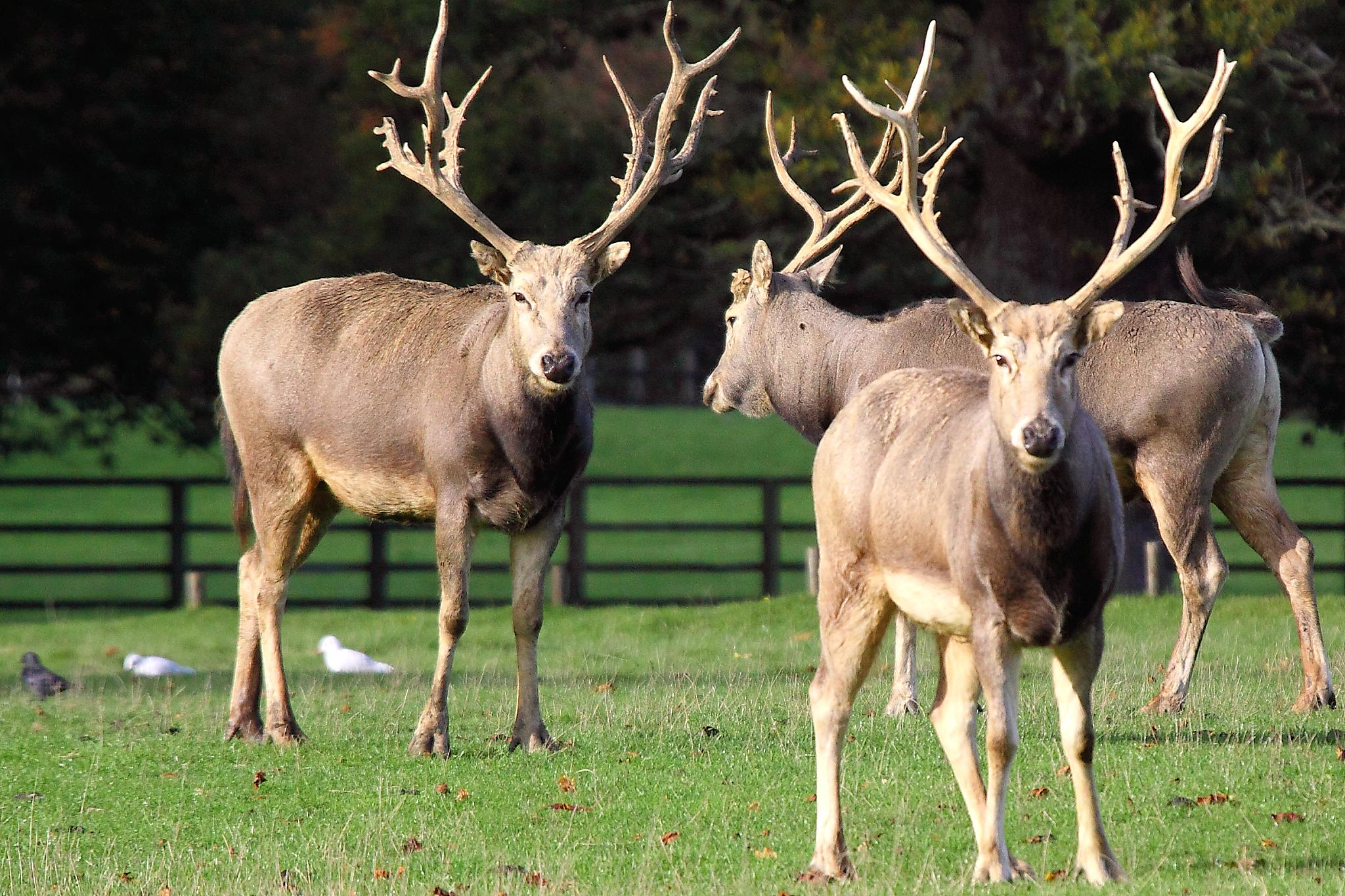
Père David's deer at Woburn Deer Park, where the species was saved and from which the animal was eventually reintroduced to China

Perhaps the most remarkable endangered deer species in China is Père David's deer. This deer, colloquially known as the sibuxiang or the "Four-Not-Look-Alike", is said to have the hooves of an ox, antlers of a deer, neck of a camel and tail of a donkey, but does not look like any one animal. According to Chinese legend, this animal helped the ancient sage Jiang Ziya overthrow the tyrant king of the Shang dynasty 4,000 years ago and became a symbol of good fortune. Chinese emperors kept the sibuxiang also called milu in imperial hunting parks, even as the animal became extinct in the wild, perhaps as early as 2,000 years ago. By 1866, when Father Armand David identified the animal, there were only 200–300 remaining in the Nanhaizi Royal Park in Beijing. A few animals were sold to zoos in Europe before 1894, when the park was flooded and some of the animals escaped only to be hunted and eaten. The last of the animals in China died during the chaos of the Boxer Rebellion. In 1898, Herbrand Russell, 11th Duke of Bedford assembled a herd of 18 animals from European zoos and bred them at his estate, Woburn Abbey in England. In 1985, 22 deer from this herd was reintroduced back to the Nanhaizi Park in Beijing and in 1986 another 39 were sent to Dafeng, in northern Jiangsu on the Yellow Sea. In 1998, eight animals in the latter herd were introduced into wilderness of the Dafeng Milu National Wildlife Reserve. By 2013, the reserve had 196 Père David's deer.

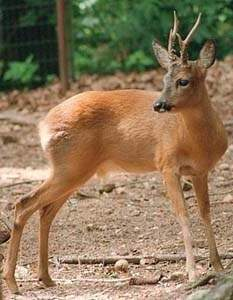
Siberian roe deer

The Siberian roe deer, once plentiful in the Northeast and favored as game meat, has also become a protected species. Hunting of roe deer was banned in 2000.

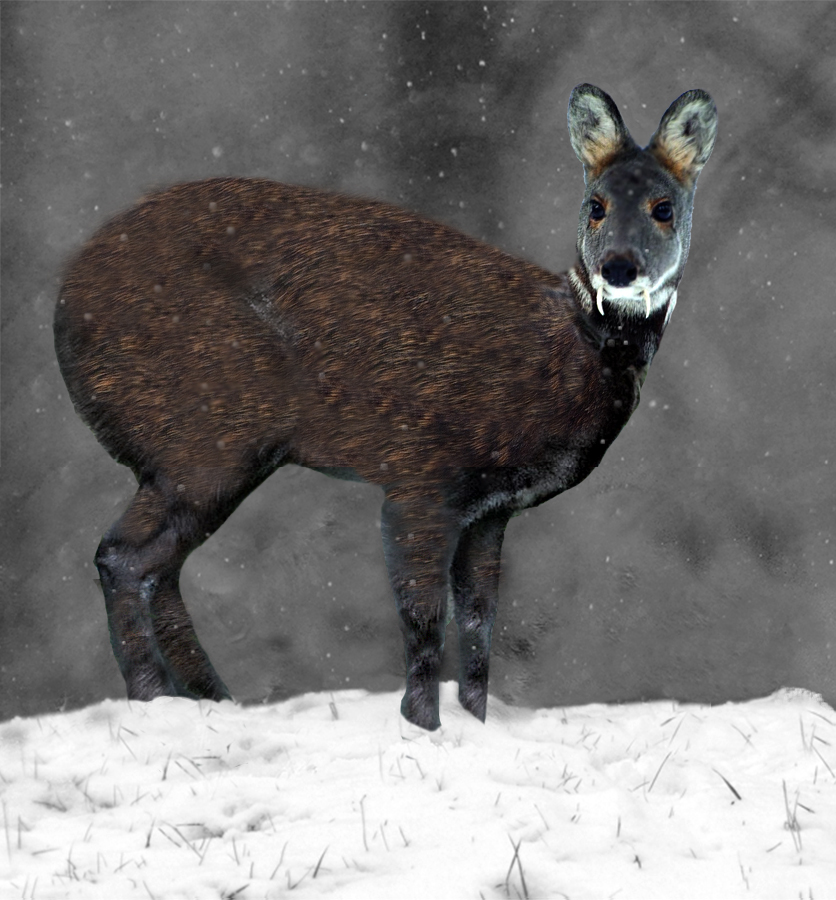
Siberian musk deer

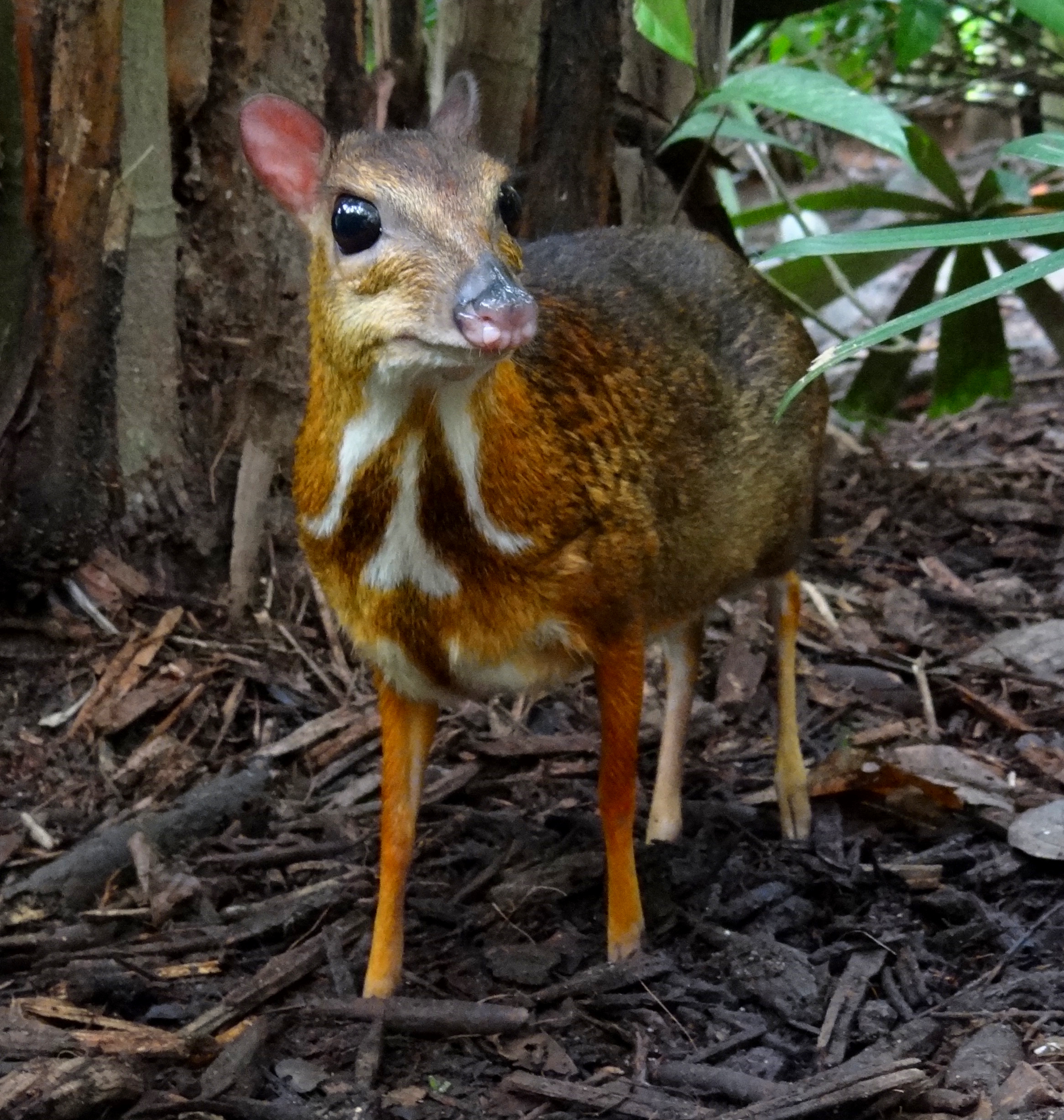
Lesser mouse-deer

Musk deer and mouse-deer resemble small deer but are not true deer. They do not have antlers or facial scent glands. Male musk deer have scent glands that secrete deer musk, which is used for perfume, incense and medicine. Of the seven musk deer species in the world, six are found in China and five are endangered: the Anhui musk deer and dwarf musk deer of central China, the alpine musk deer of western China, the white-bellied musk deer and black musk deer of Tibet. The Siberian musk deer in the northeast is considered vulnerable. The lesser mouse-deer is found in southern Yunnan.

==== Antelope ====
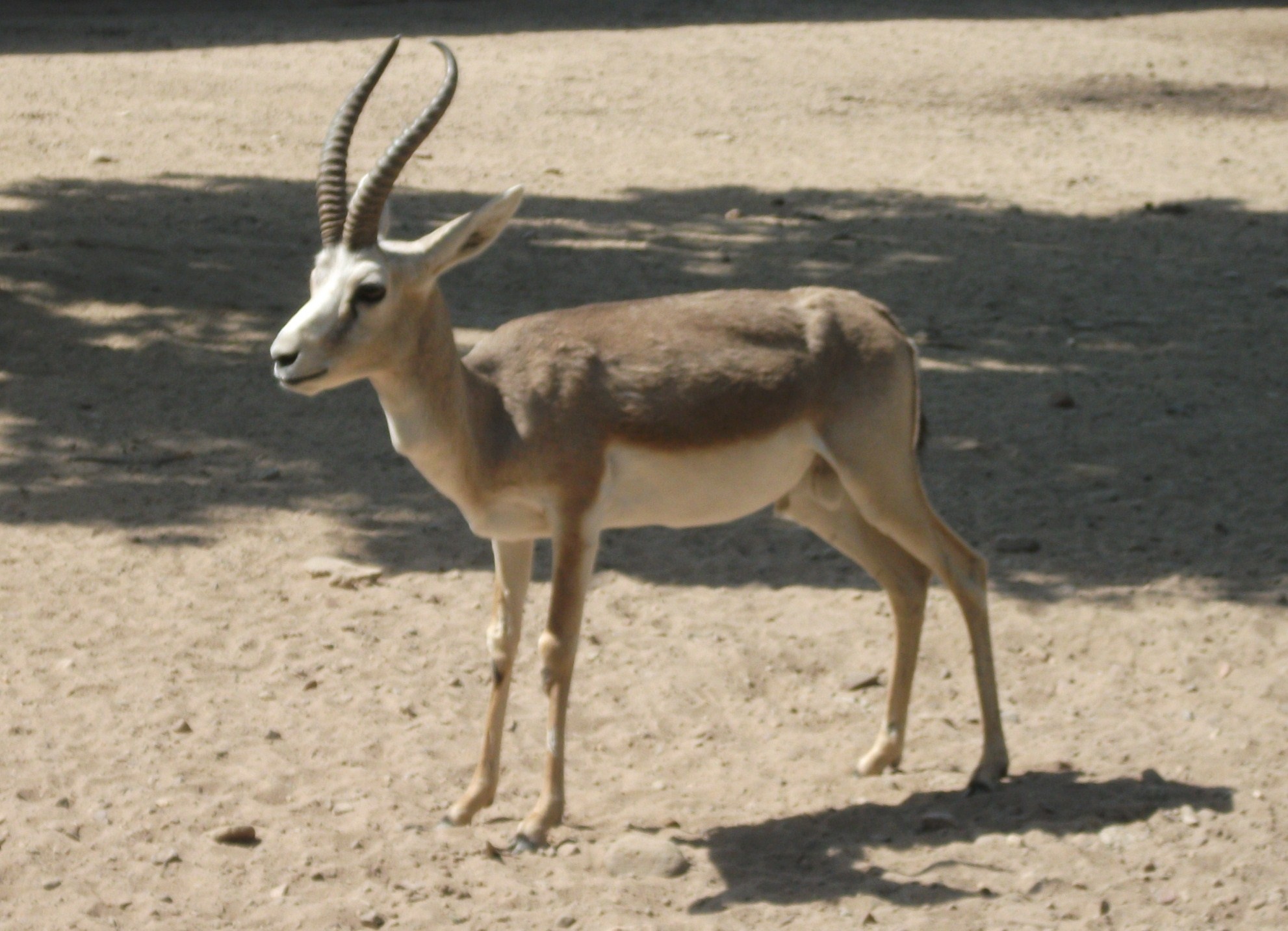
Goitered gazelle

The grasslands, plateau and deserts of northern and western China are home to several species of antelope. The Mongolian gazelle, also known as the Zeren or yellow sheep, can run at speeds of up to 90 km/h and gather in herds by the thousands. They used to be spread over much of northern China but are now confined largely to Inner Mongolia. The Tibetan gazelle or goa antelope, is slightly smaller than the Mongolian gazelle, and lives on the Tibetan Plateau. The Przewalski's gazelle, whose males have distinctive horns that curl outward and then inward at the top, are extremely rare and endemic to a small region around Qinghai Lake on the northeastern part of the Tibetan Plateau. The goitered gazelle is about the same size as the Mongolian gazelle and is found throughout the Gobi Desert.

The Tibetan antelope, also known as chiru, is taller than the gazelles and has longer horns. It is endemic to the Tibetan Plateau and is endangered. The animal is poached for its fine wool, which is made by Kashmiri weavers into the Shahtoosh shawl. The film Kekexili: Mountain Patrol documents efforts to protect the animal from poaching. The Tibetan antelope was one of the mascots for the 2008 Summer Olympics.

The saiga antelope's horns are used in traditional Chinese medicine to treat a variety of ailments including the common cold. Despite its status as a Class I protected species, the saiga antelope has been poached to extinction in the Dzungar Basin of northern Xinjiang and is critically endangered in Central Asia and Russia. Chinese police routinely interdict large batches of smuggled horns into Xinjiang. Attempts have been made to reintroduce the saiga antelope to habitats in China.

==== Goat antelopes ====
Serows, gorals, and the takin are called antelope by the Chinese, and goat antelope by western taxonomists.

The largest of these goat antelope is the takin, a relative of the musk ox. It lives in highlands from the eastern foothills of the Himalayas to the Qinling and shares habitat with the giant panda in Sichuan and Shaanxi. The takin is a Class I protected species.

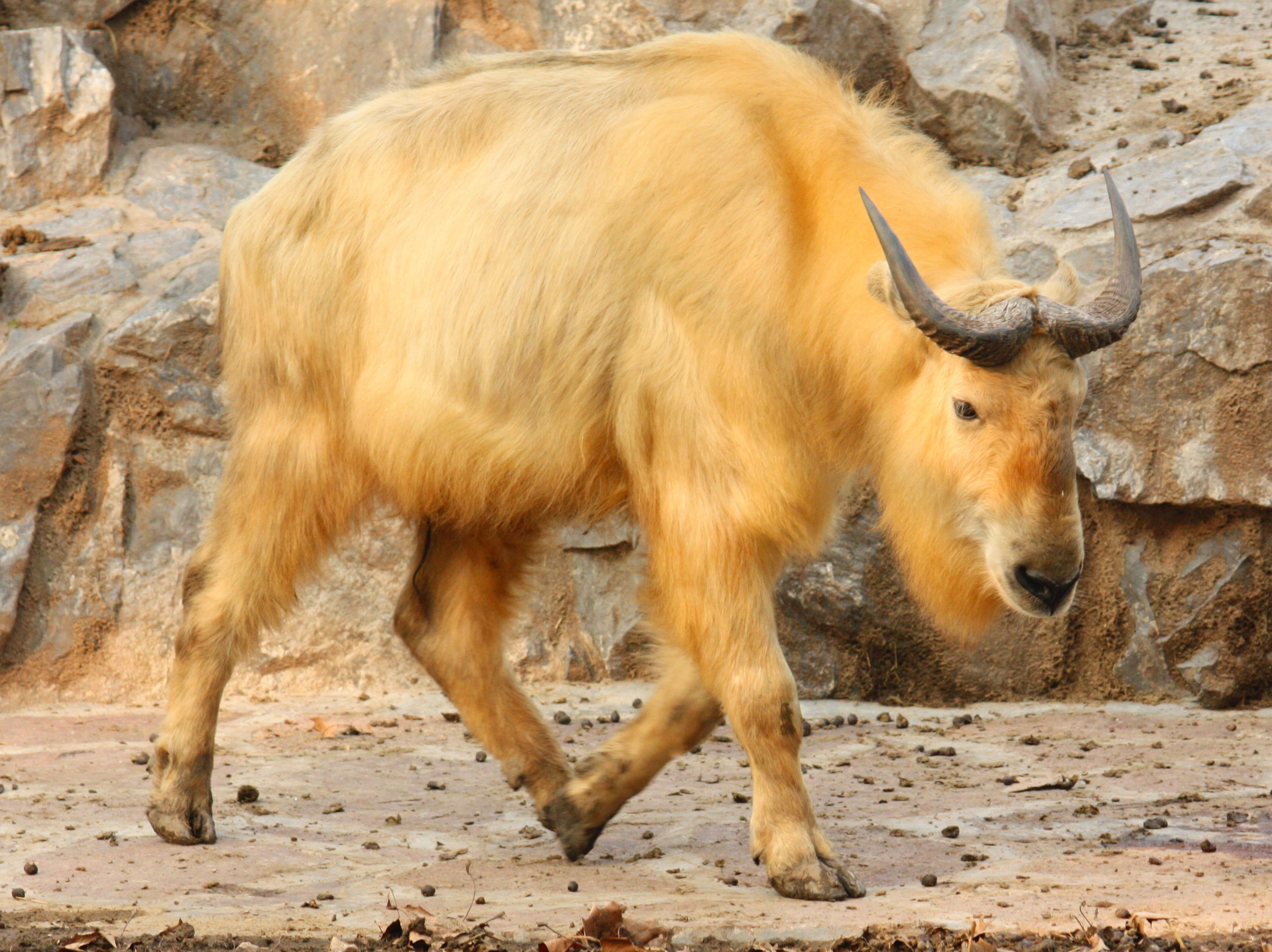
Takin

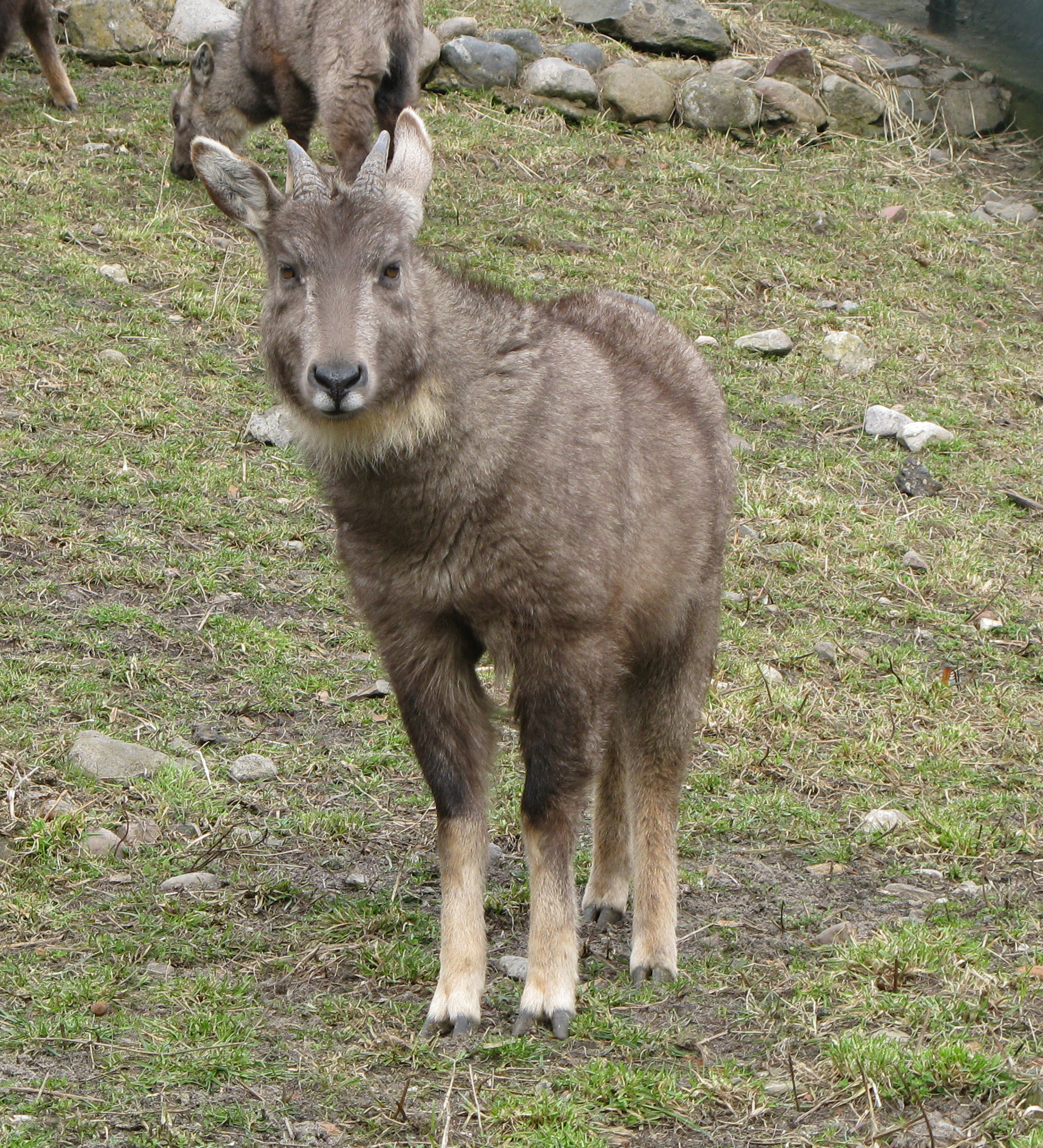
Long-tailed goral

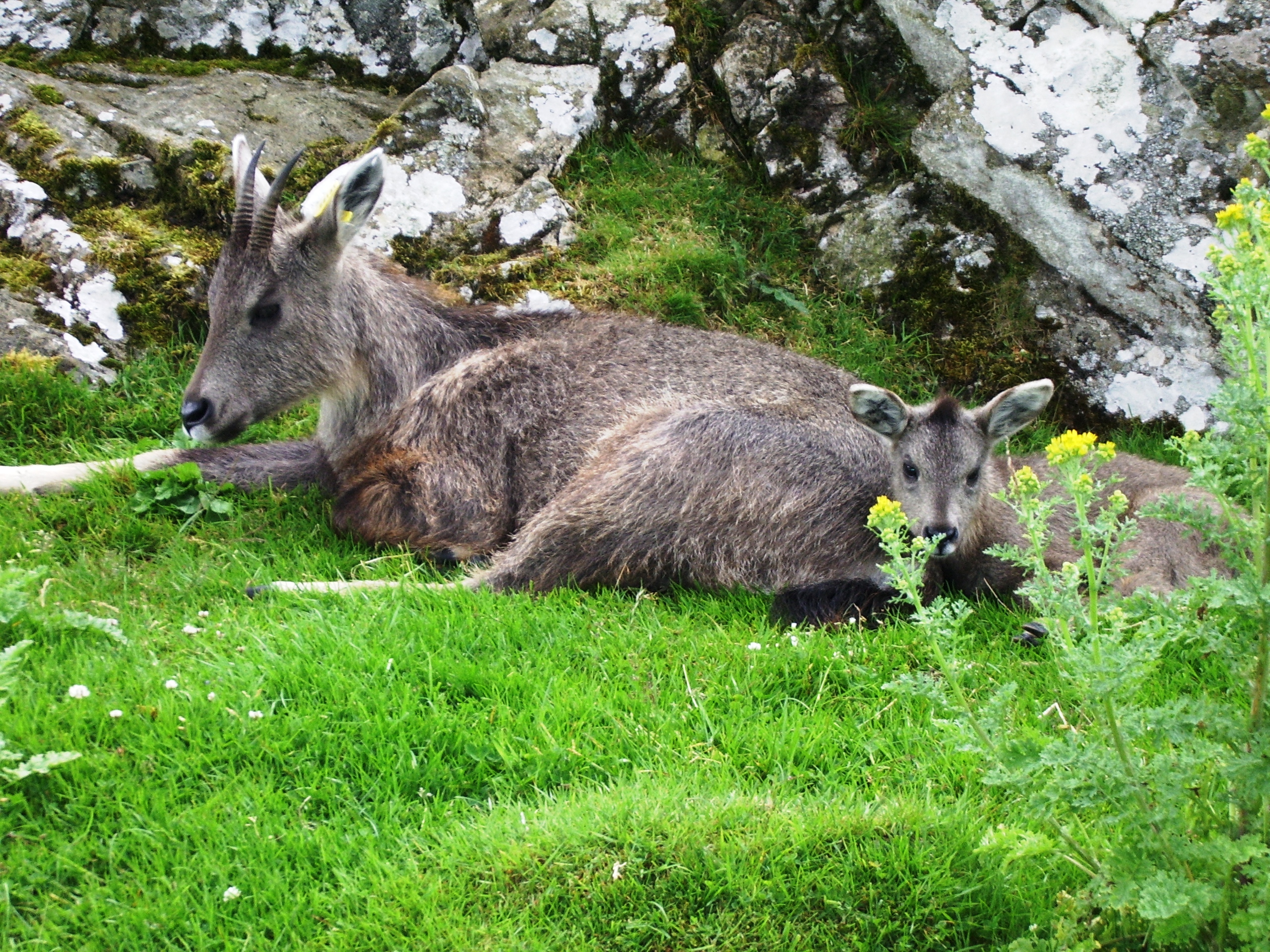
Chinese goral with kid

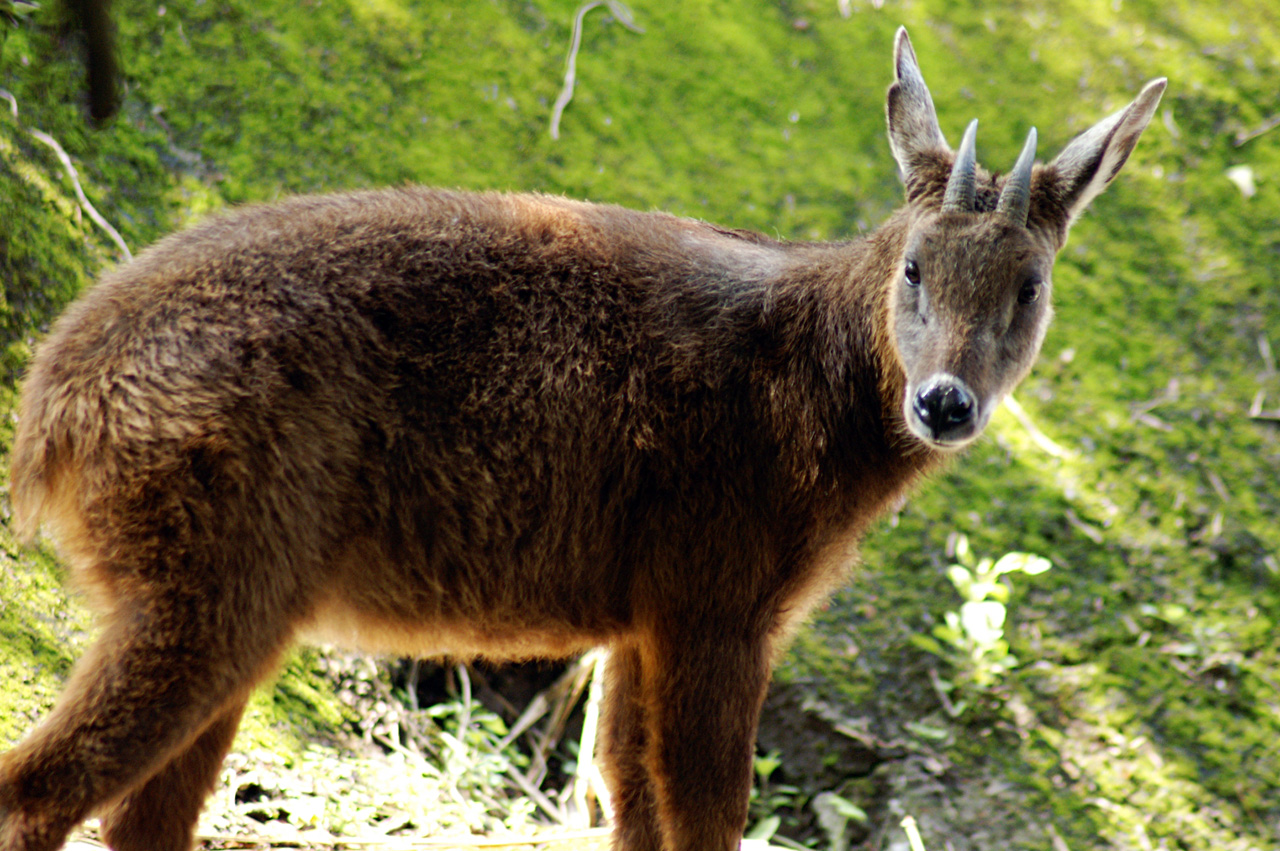
Taiwan serow

Serows are smaller than takins but significantly larger than gorals. Both serows and gorals live in rainy mountainous regions and are excellent climbers. Serows have shorter and coarser wool than gorals. The mainland serow is spread across southern China. The range of the Chinese goral is even broader, extending to Korea in the northeast. The long-tailed goral lives in the northeast, along the borders with Russia and North Korea. The Himalayan serow, Himalayan goral, and red goral are found in southern Tibet. The Taiwan serow is endemic to Taiwan.

==== Mountain sheep and goat ====
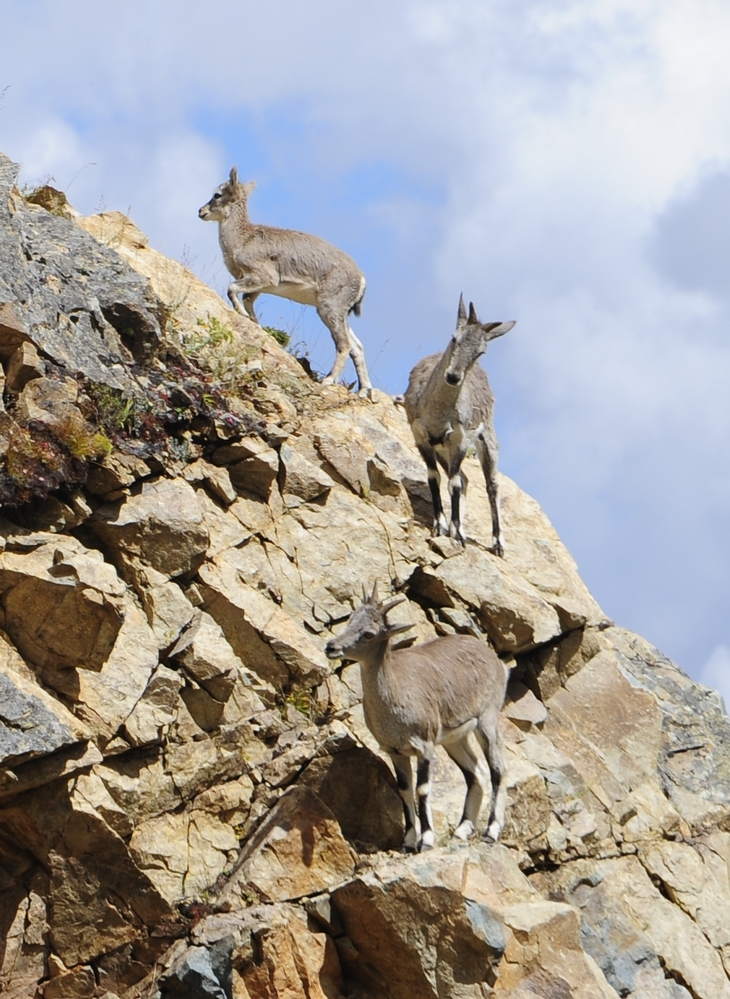
Himalayan blue sheep or bharal

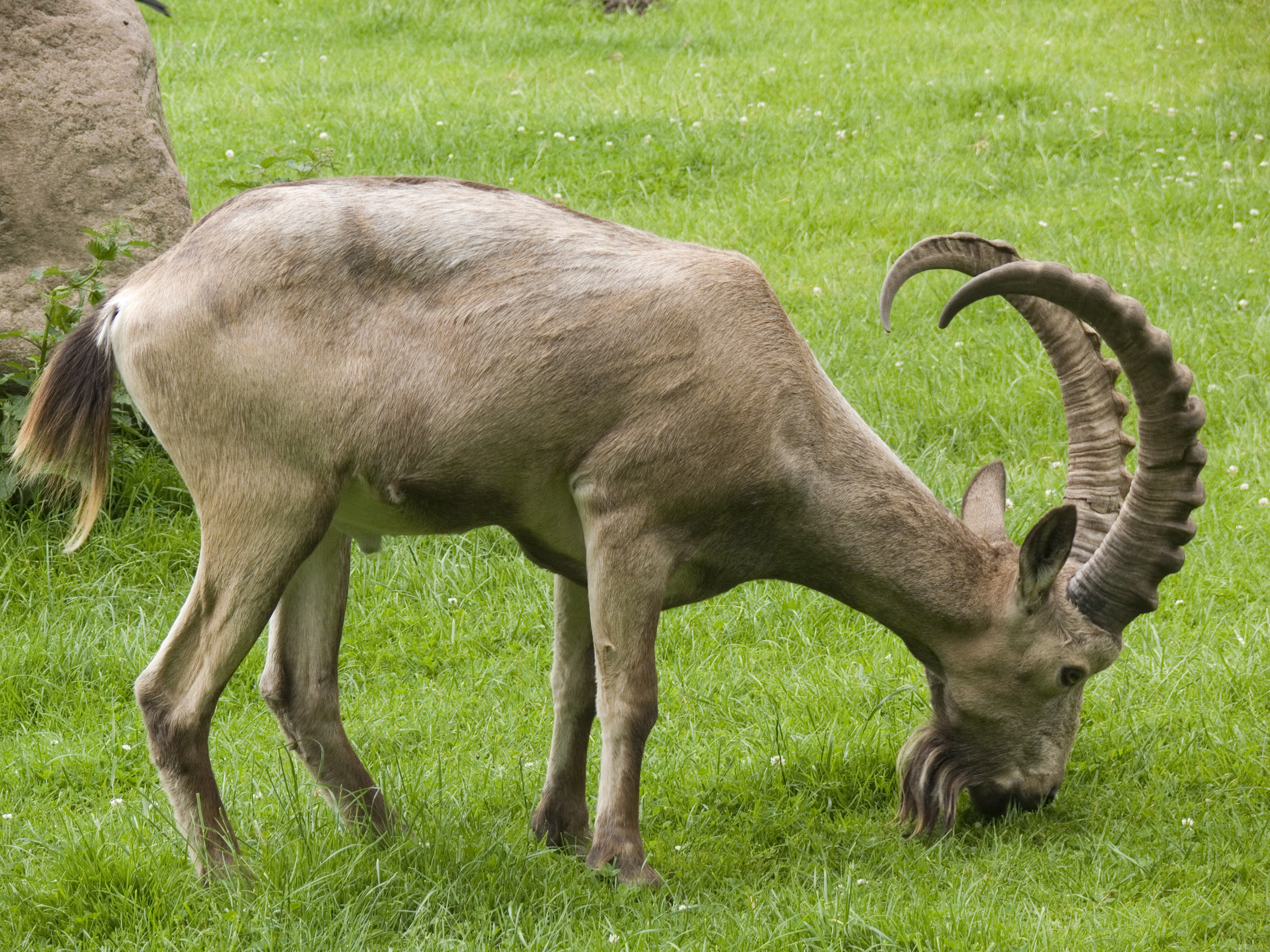
Siberian ibex

The argali or mountain sheep, the Asian cousin of the North American bighorn sheep has nine subspecies, seven of which are found in northern and western China, including the Marco Polo sheep, which the Venetian traveler reported observing in the Pamir mountains.

The Himalayan blue sheep, with much smaller horns than the argali, are agile climbers on Himalayan cliffs. The dwarf blue sheep is found in western Sichuan. The Himalayan tahr, discovered in China in 1974, is a Class I protected species with perhaps only 500 animals in southern Tibet.

The Siberian ibex, the largest and heaviest goat, is found in the Tian Shan range of Xinjiang.

==== Cattle, camel, pig ====
There are large numbers of domesticated gaur, yak and Bactrian camel in China but in the wild, they are Class I protected species. The gaur or Indian bison is the tallest species of cattle and found in southern Tibet and Yunnan. Domesticated gaur, called gayal, is raised by farmers in Yunnan. Yaks are the largest animals on the Tibetan Plateau. Wild yaks are larger than domestic yaks and slightly smaller than the gaur. They can tolerate extremely cold climate, climb steep slopes, and ford fierce rapids. Yaks are the imost important animal for Tibetan herders, who eat yak meat and milk for food, burn yak dung as fuel, spin yak hair into fabric, make yak hide leather and use yaks to transport and plow fields. Bactrian camels have two humps and can go a month or longer without drinking water. A thirsty Bactrian camel can drink 135 liters (30 gallons) in only 13 minutes. They can withstand extremely hot and cold weather and have broad hooves that do not sink in desert. Bactrian camels are known as the "boats of desert" – for millennia, they were used to carry goods along the Silk Road. Wild camels are critically endangered and found in the Gobi and Taklamakan Deserts.

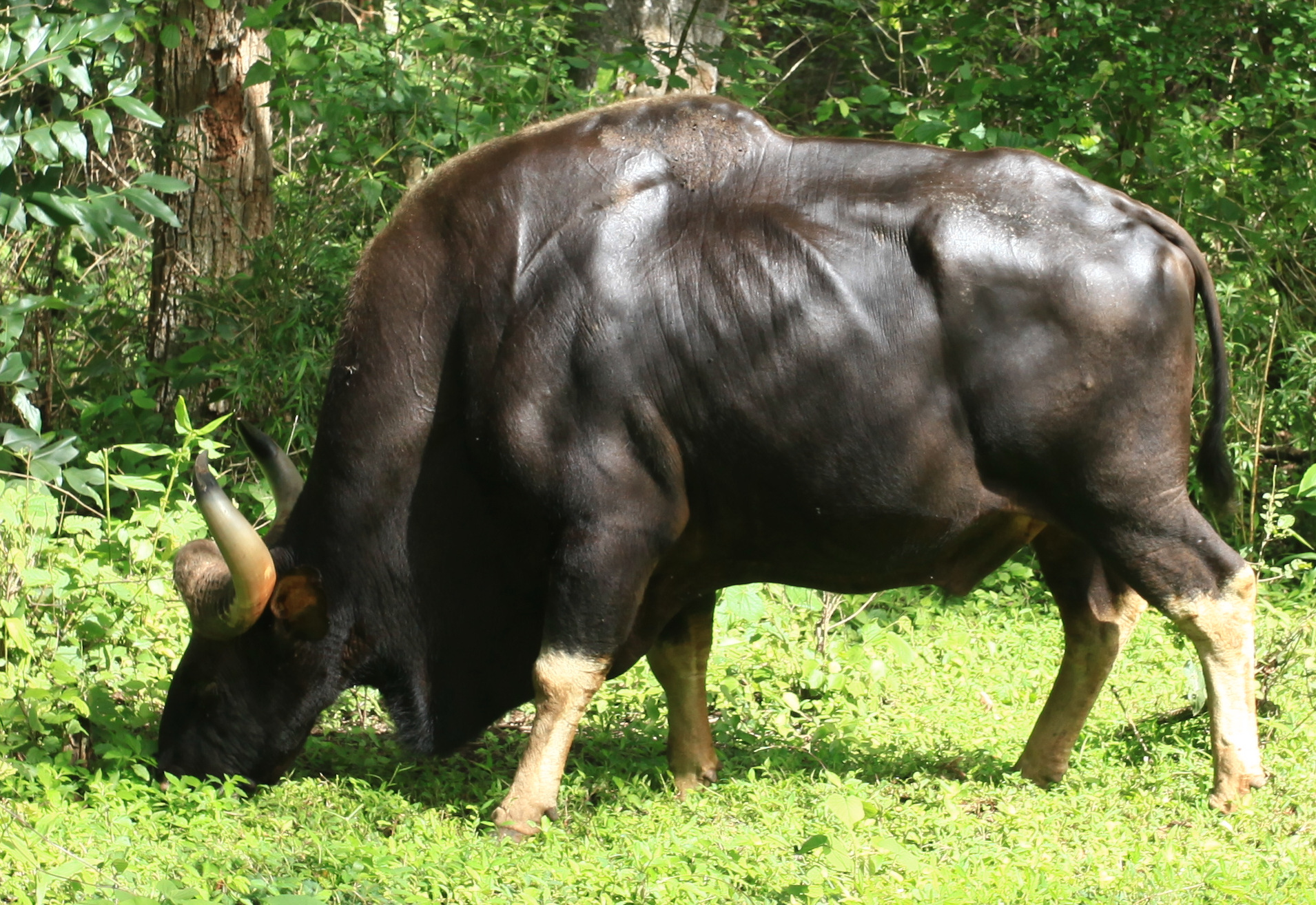
Gaur

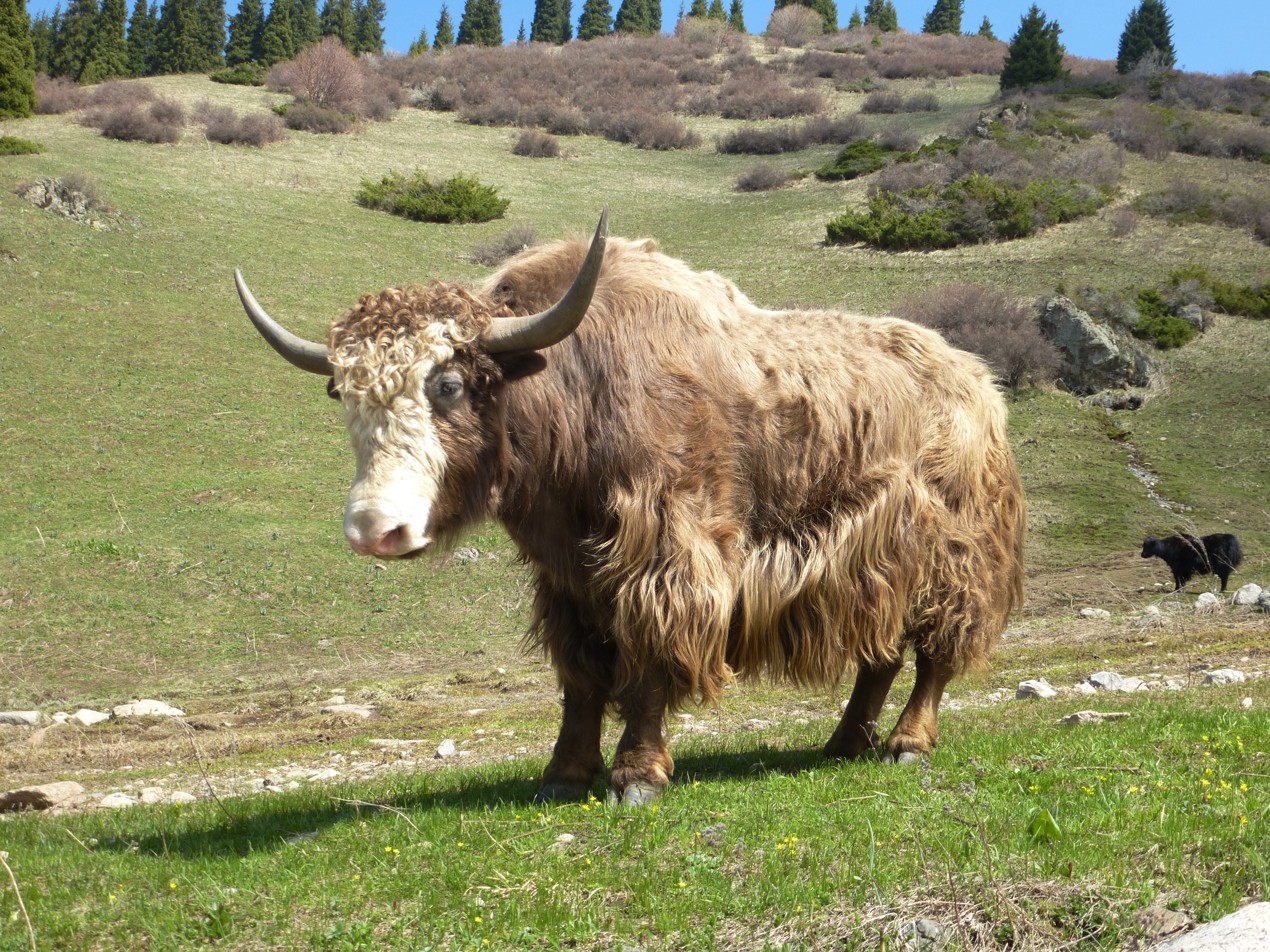
Yak

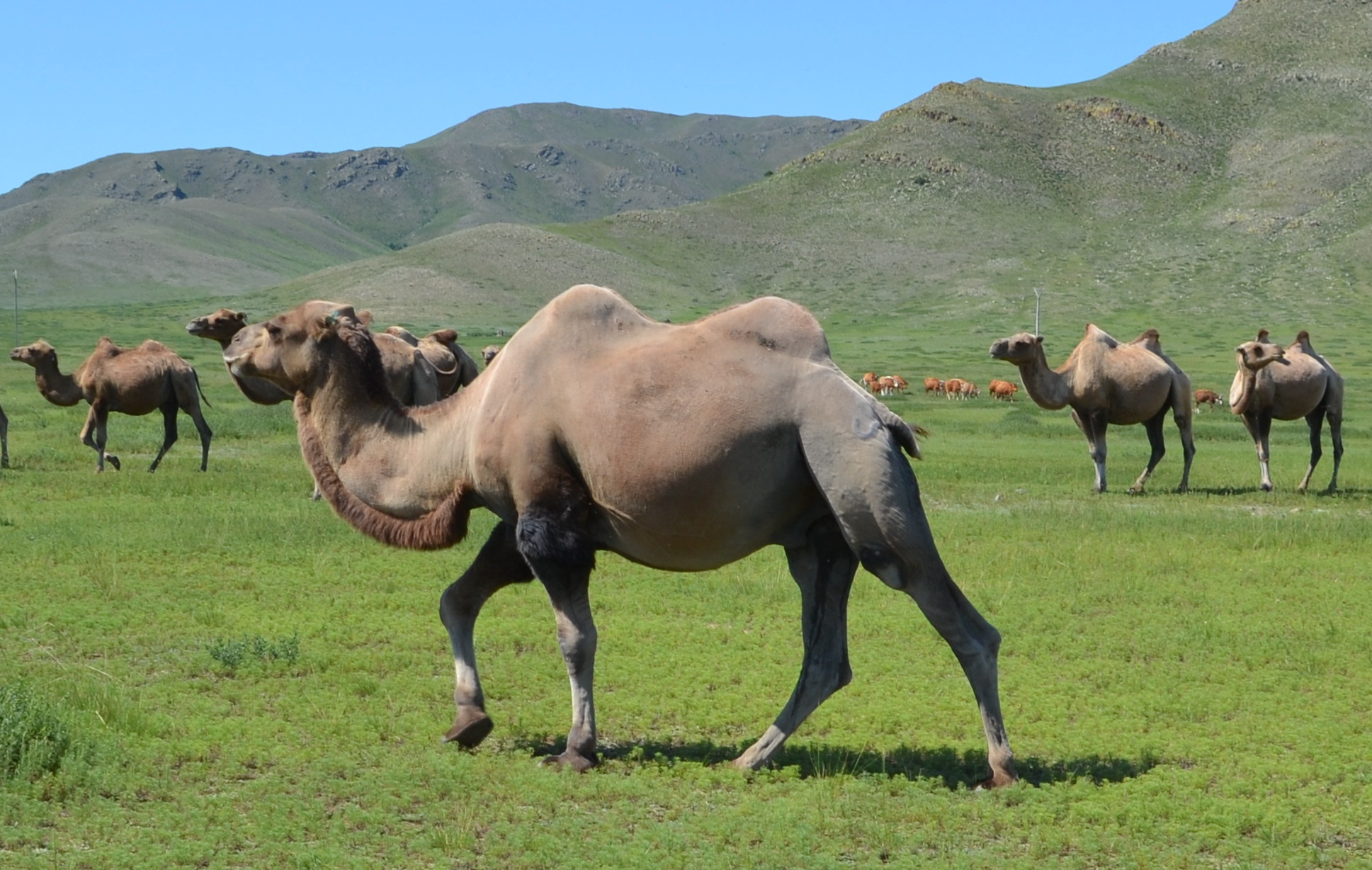
Bactrian camels

The wild boar, from which the farm-raised pigs was domesticated some 8,000 years ago in China, remains common in the Chinese wilderness. On occasion, boars will interbreed with farm-raised pigs. The Manchurian wild boar is the largest of the wild boar species. The Formosan wild boar is a subspecies endemic to Taiwan.

=== Pangolin ===
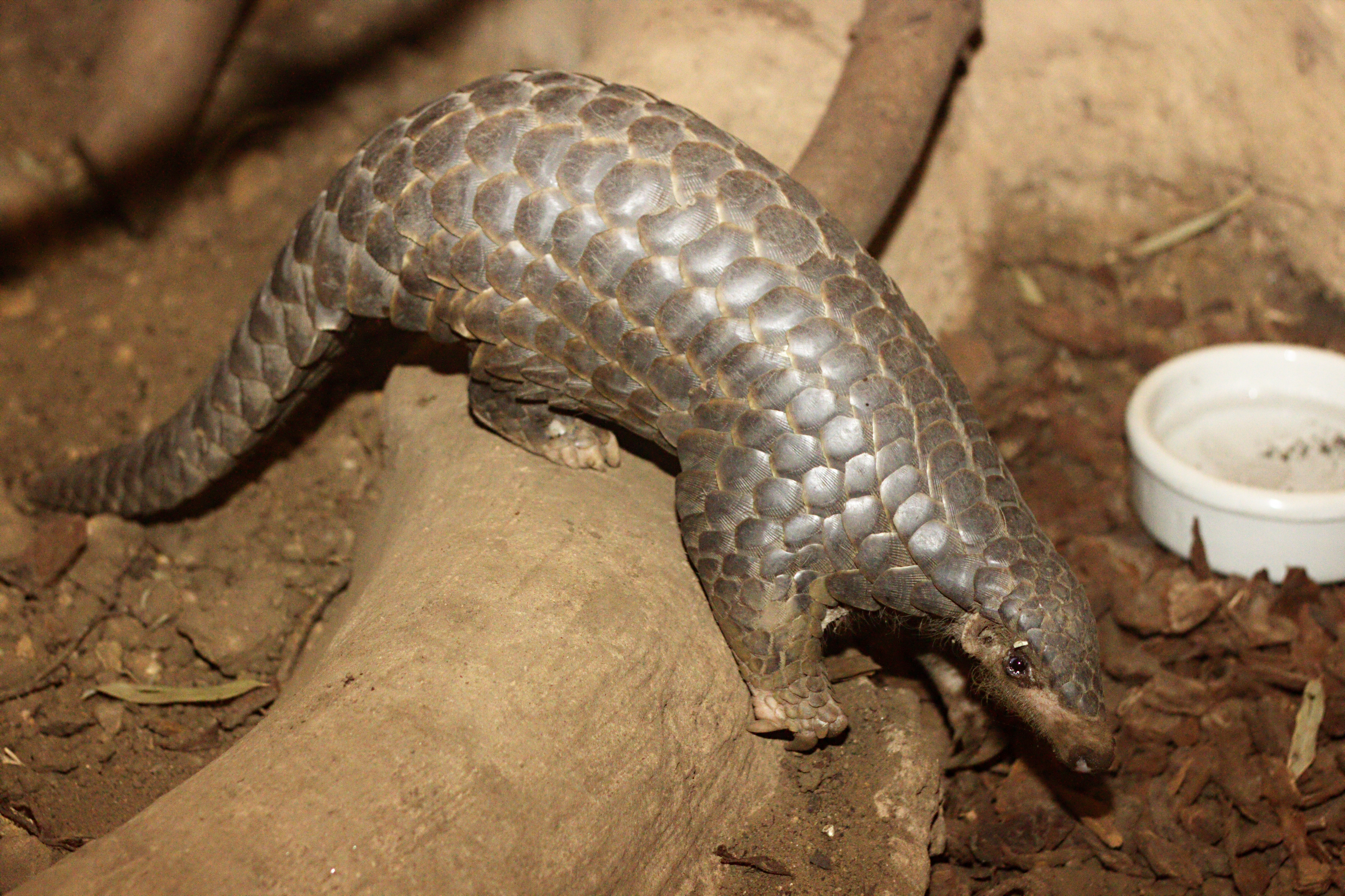
Chinese pangolin

The pangolin, a scaly anteater that feed on ants and termites and curl into a ball when threatened, is prized in China for its flesh, which is considered a delicacy and scales, which used in traditional Chinese medicine to treat among other ailments, inadequate lactation in breast-feeding mothers. The Chinese pangolin is found throughout southern China, Hainan and Taiwan and the Sunda pangolin in western Yunnan. In Chinese, the pangolin is called "that which wears mountain armor" and the animal is believed by local shamans to hold magical powers such that hunters must utter incantation before killing them to ward off bad luck. As a Class II protected species, trading of wild pangolins is prohibited, but poaching and illegal trade remains rampant. The pangolin can be farm-raised, but pangolin farms must generally also raise termites to feed the livestock. In recent years, Chinese customs have intercepted large shipments of pangolin from Southeast Asia and Africa.

=== Rodents ===
==== Porcupine ====
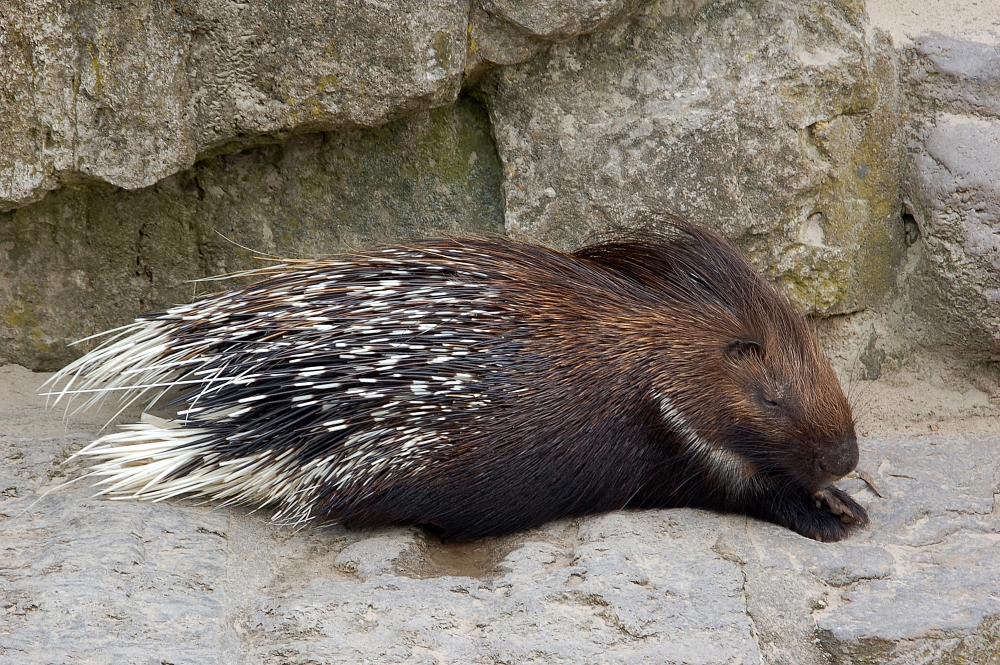
Indian porcupine

The porcupine, called haozhu or "pig with long thin hair" in Chinese, should not be confused with hedgehog, ciwei or the "thorned creature". Porcupines are rodents and hedgehogs belong to a separate order. Three species of Old World porcupine are found in China: the Asiatic brush-tailed porcupine, Indian crested porcupine, and Malayan porcupine. Many parts of the porcupine including the brain, organs, fat, quills and even the feces can be used to make traditional Chinese medicine. Porcupines are raised on farms.

==== Beaver ====
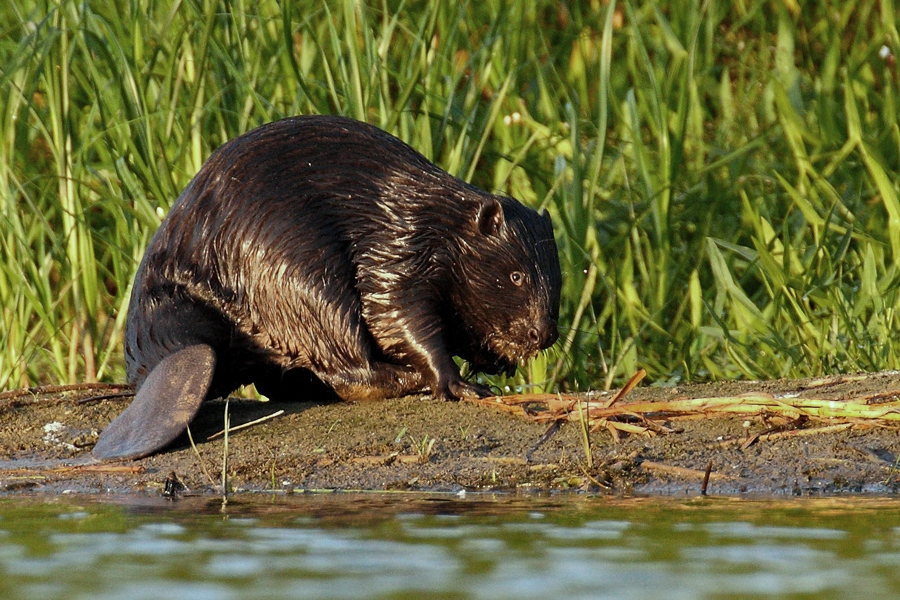
Eurasian beaver

In the early 20th century, the Eurasian beaver was hunted to near extinction for its fur and castoreum, a scent gland secretion used to make perfume and medicine. Though the global population has rebounded, the animal remains a Class I protected species. The Bulgan Beaver Nature Reserve in Qinggil County of northern Xinjiang, at the source of the Irtysh and Ulungur River along the border with Mongolia, was created in 1980 to protect the beaver. In 2007, there were 145 beaver colonies with an estimated population of 500–600 beavers in the reserve.

==== Squirrels ====
Squirrels are called songshu or "pine rodent" in Chinese but not all species live in trees. The squirrel family includes tree squirrels, flying squirrels, ground squirrels, rock squirrels, marmots and chipmunks, which are all found in China, often in great variety.

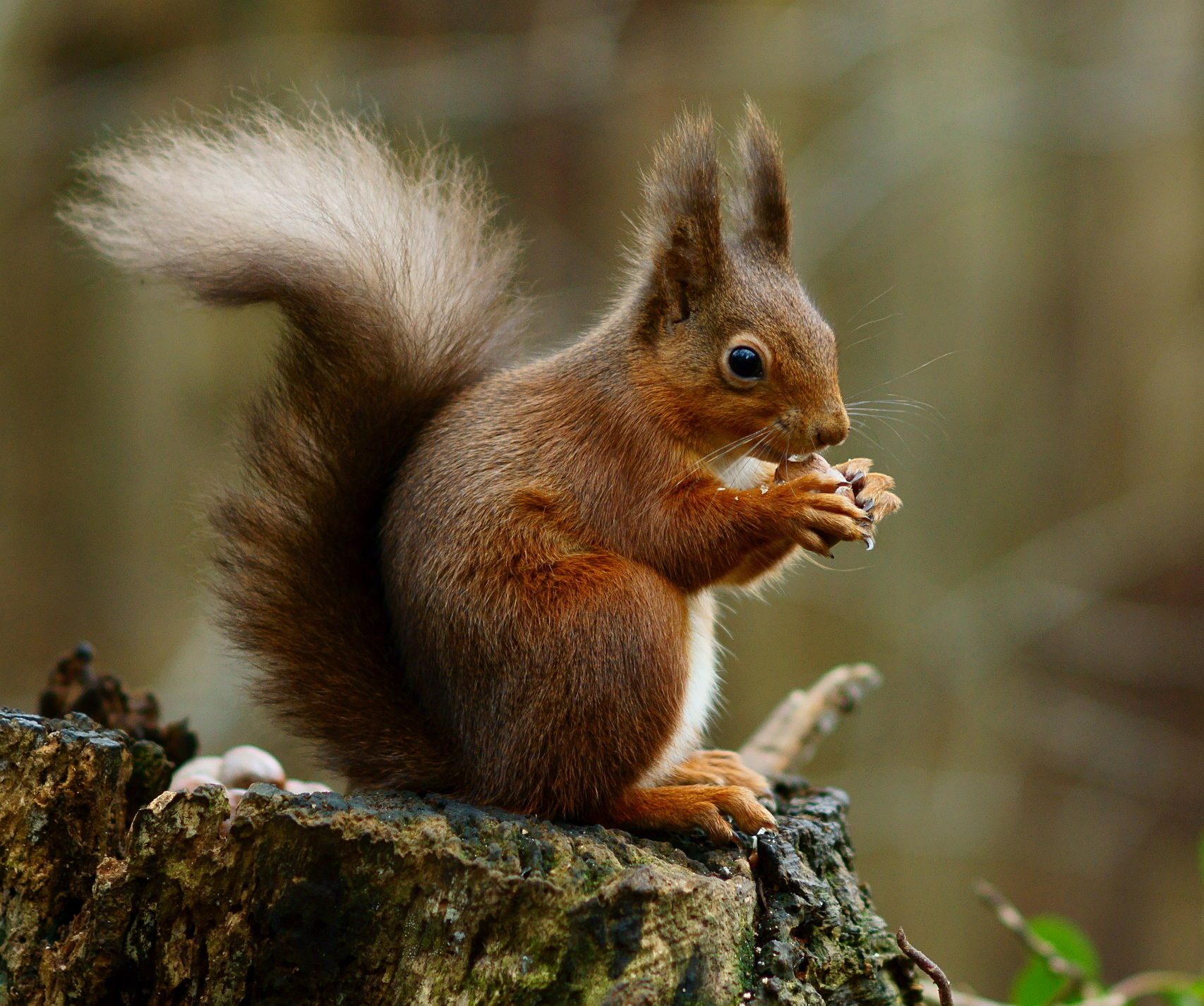
Red squirrel

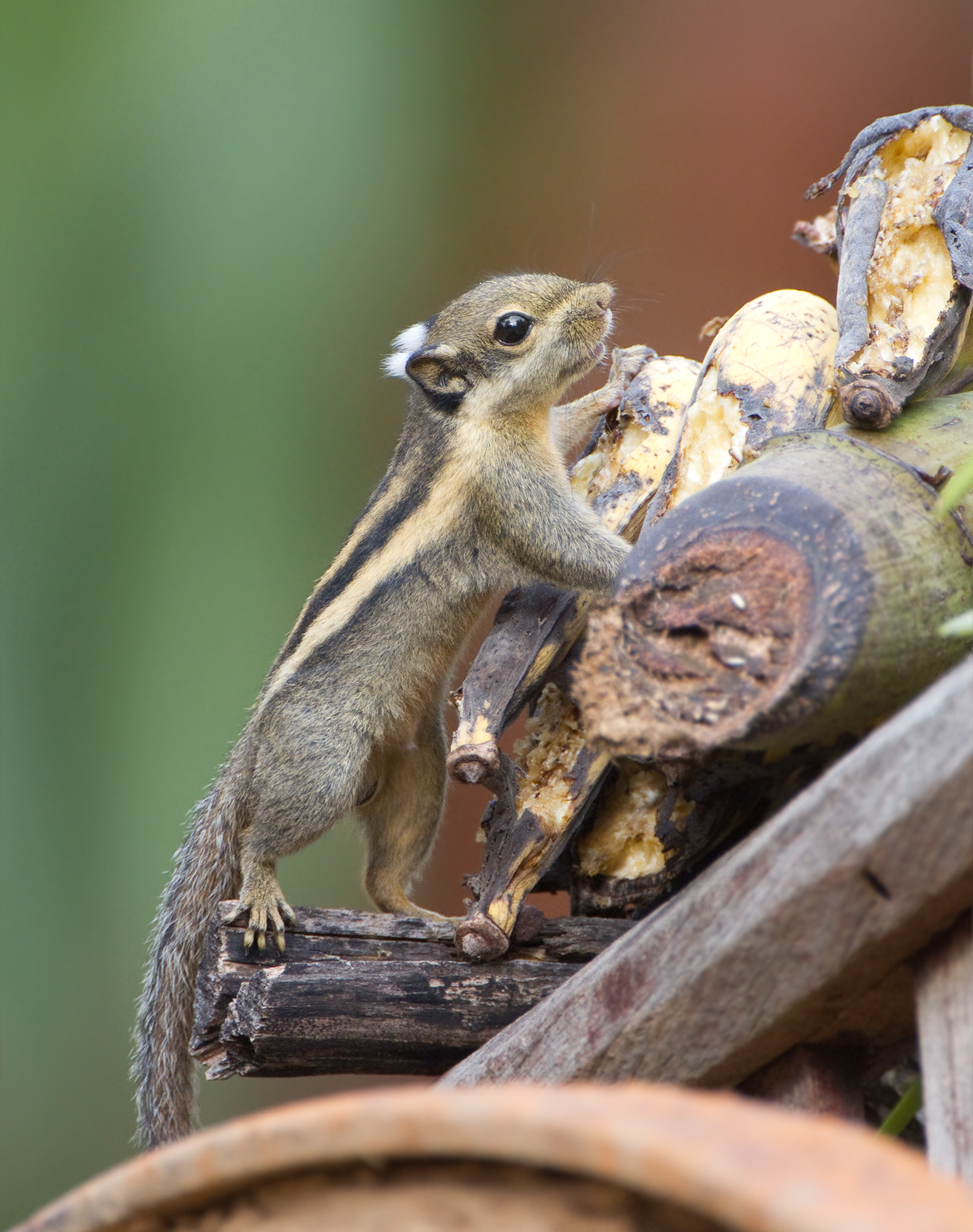
Himalayan striped squirrel

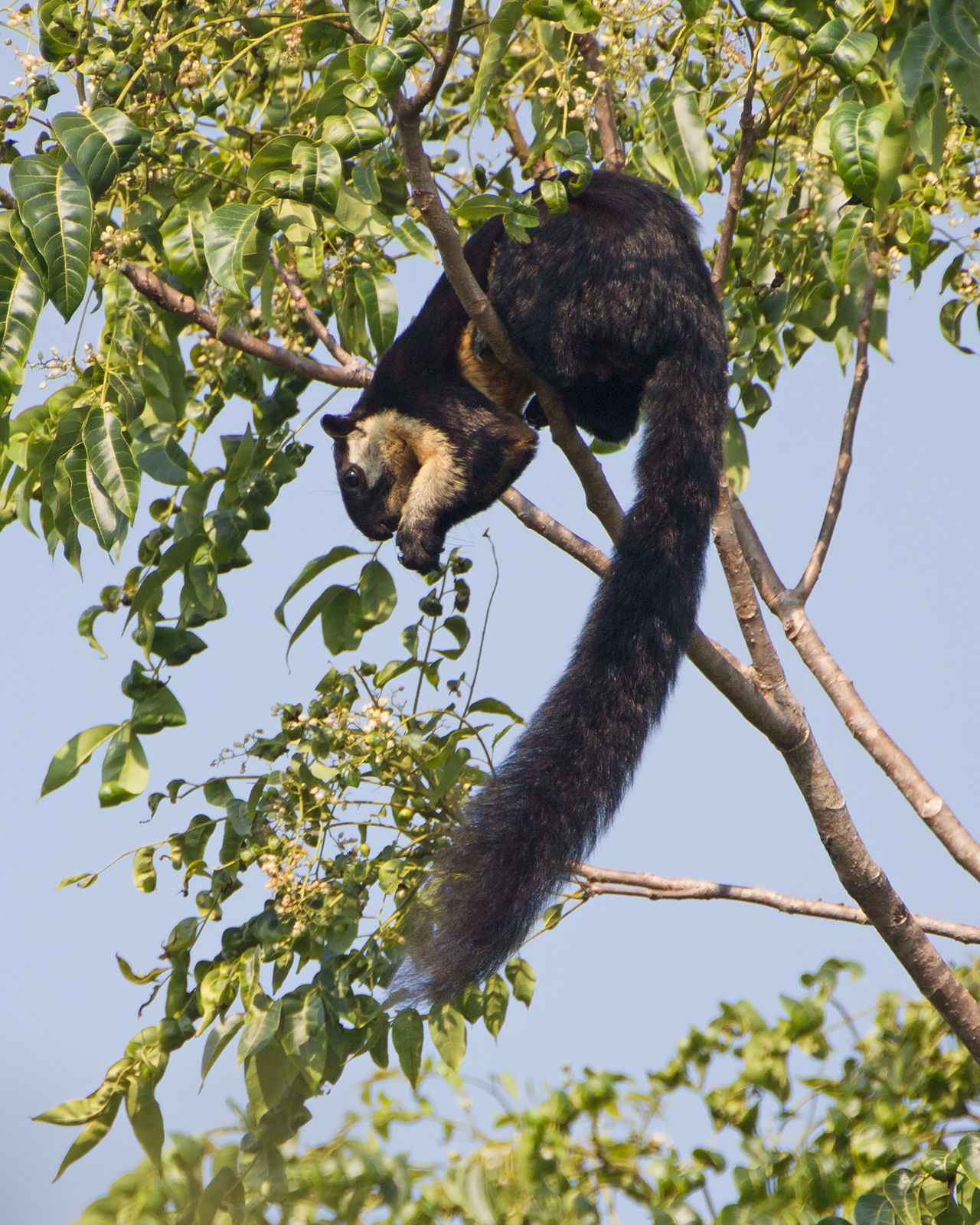
Black giant squirrel

The red squirrel common in Europe and the black giant squirrel of Southeast Asia are found, respectively, in the northern and southern parts of China. Other tree squirrel species include the Pallas's, inornate, Phayre's, Irrawaddy, Anderson's, orange-bellied Himalayan, Perny's long-nosed, red-hipped, Asian red-cheeked, Himalayan striped, Maritime striped, and Swinhoe's striped squirrel.

Flying squirrels are found in almost every part of China, from the Himalayas to the tropical island of Hainan to the rural outskirts of Beijing. Flying squirrel species include the groove-toothed, complex-toothed, hairy-footed, particolored, Indochinese, red giant, red and white giant, spotted giant, Indian giant, Chinese giant, Japanese giant, Bhutan giant, Siberian, Yunnan giant (petaurista yunnanensis), and Hodgson's giant. Several are endemic to China.

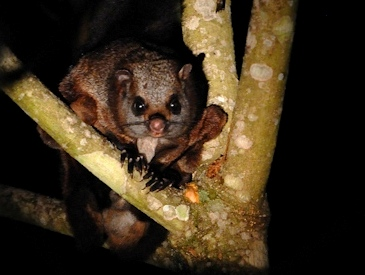
Indian giant flying squirrel

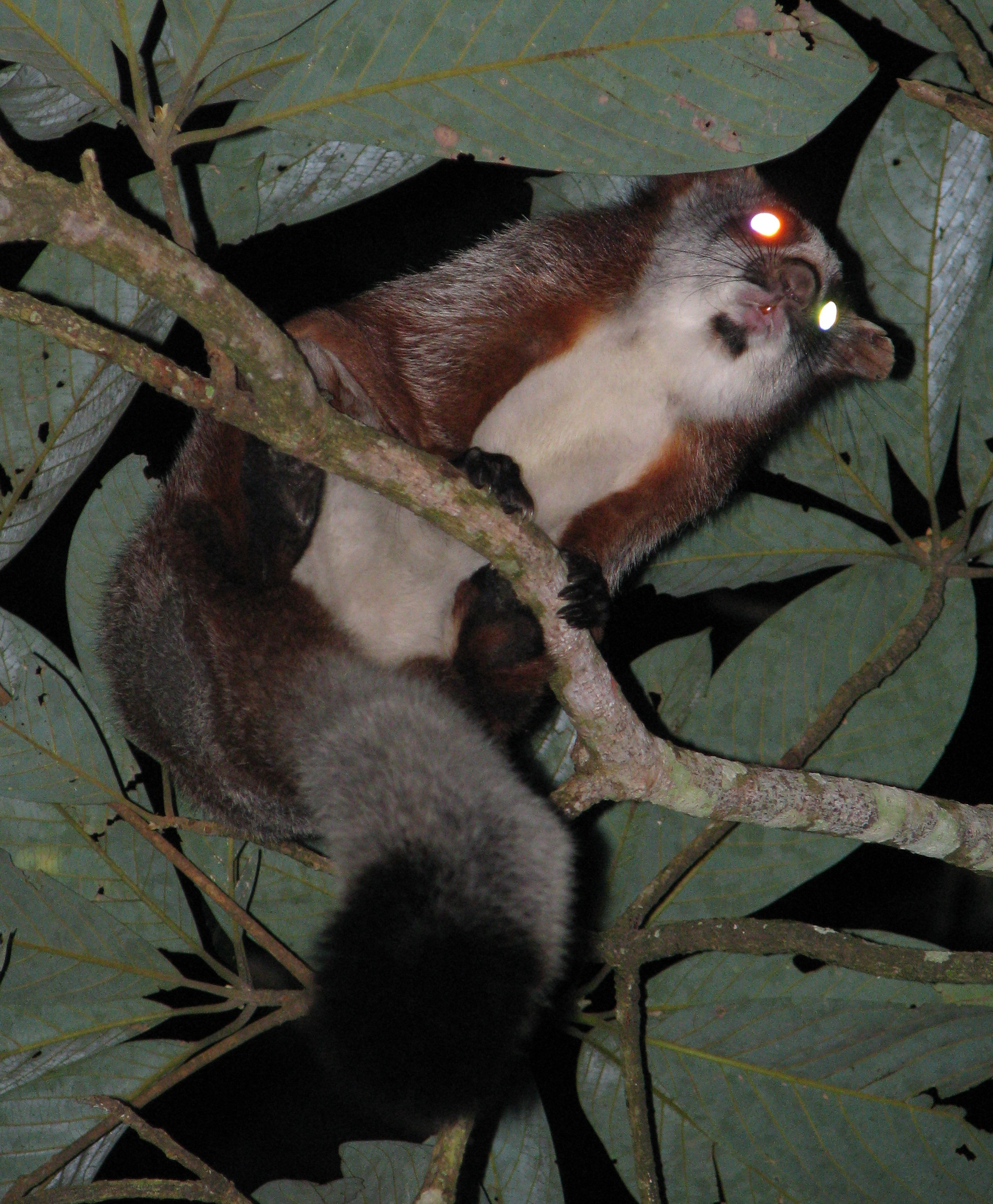
Red giant flying squirrel

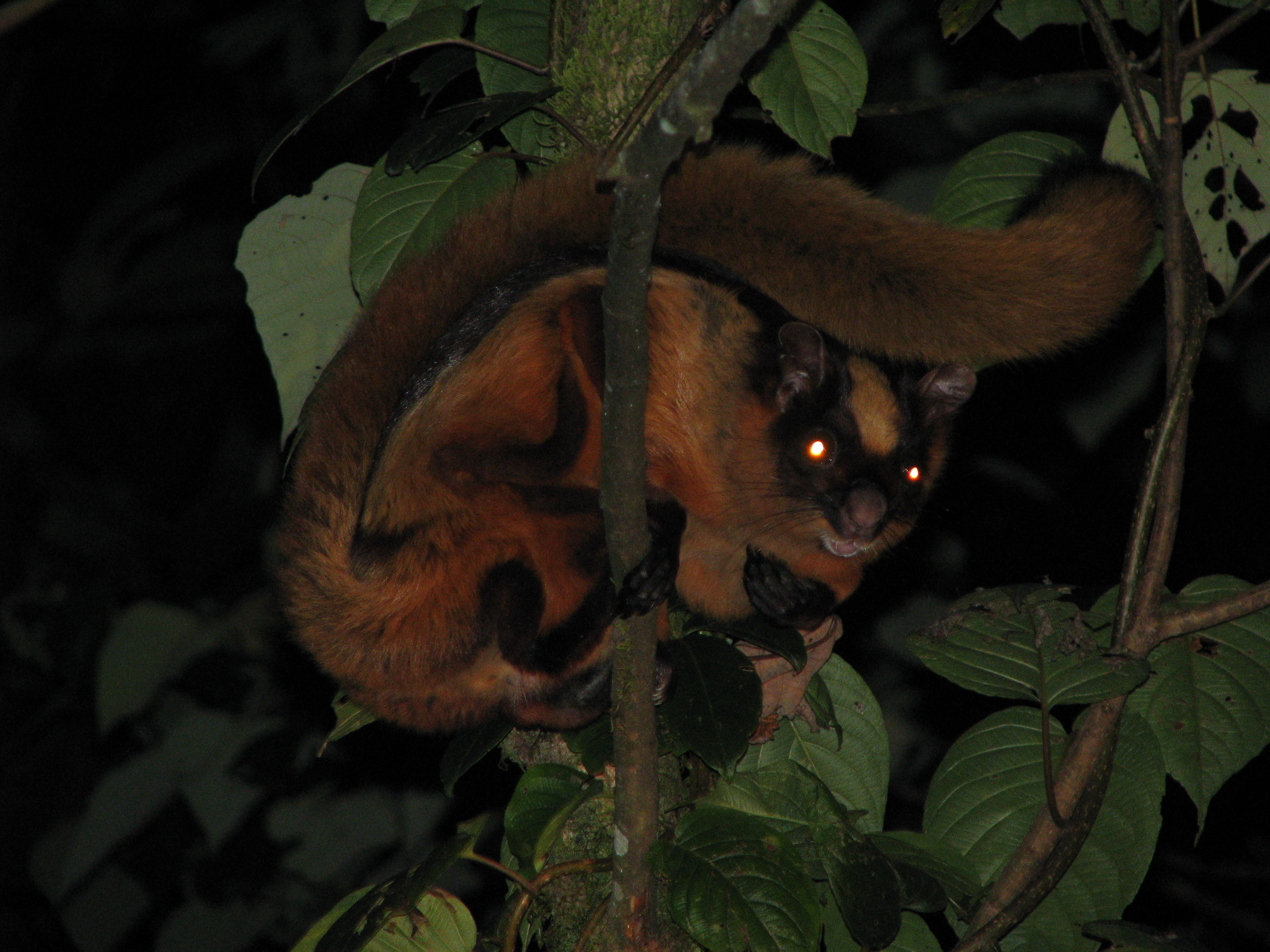
Bhutan giant flying squirrel

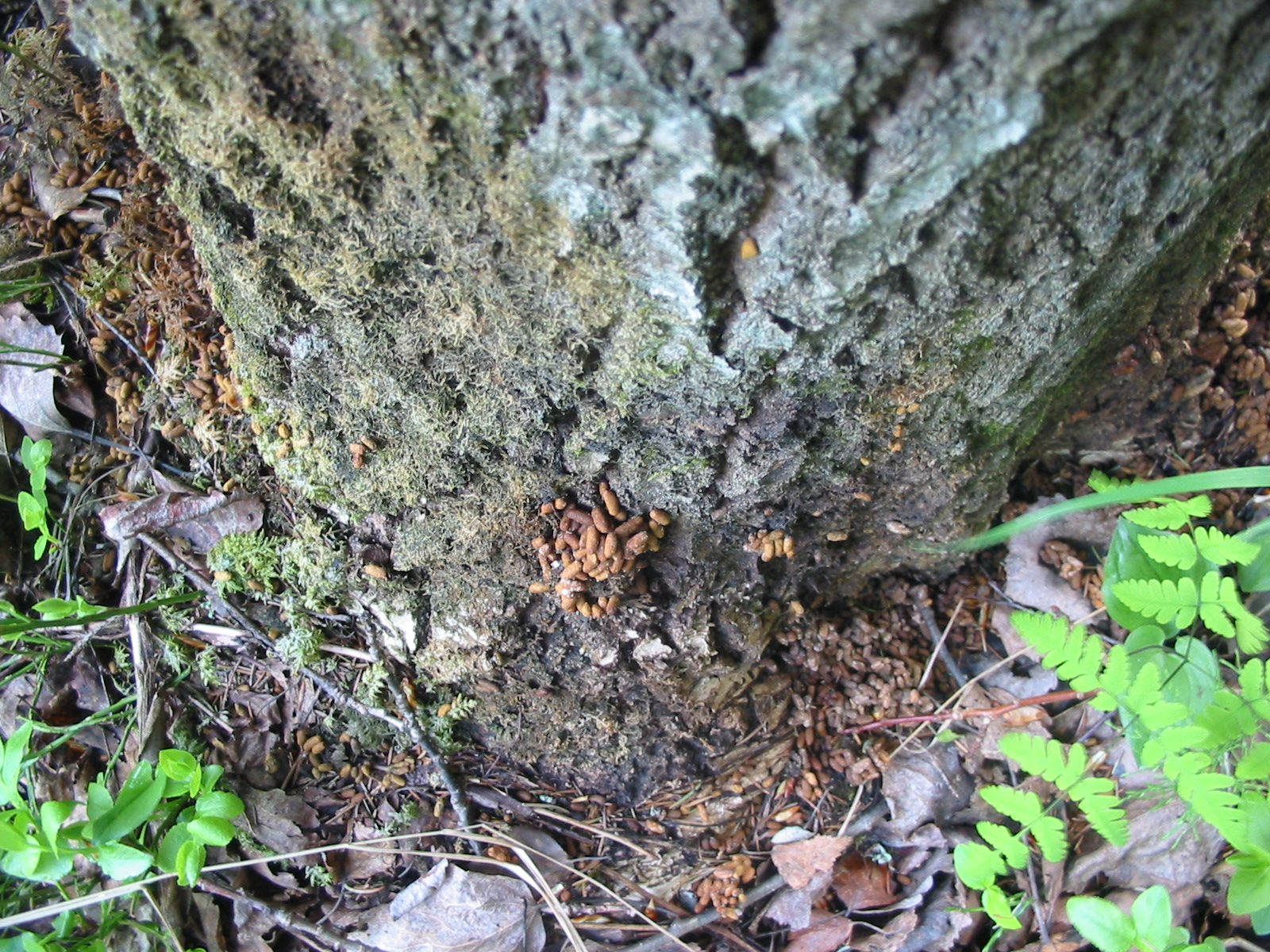
The fecal pellets of the Siberian flying squirrel. The pellets are used in traditional Chinese medicine.

Flying squirrels are timid creatures that are active at nighttime and use the patagium, a membrane connecting the fore and hind limbs to glide from trees. They do not build nests and live in caves or rock crevices. They also defecate at specific locations, which facilitates the harvest of their fecal pellets. The pellets are made into wulingzhi, a traditional Chinese medicine used to facilitate blood flow and ease pain. Flying squirrel pellets can accumulate on the floor of caves for years and not rot. Several species of flying squirrels are farm-raised to produce wulingzhi.

The groove-toothed flying squirrel, also known as the North Chinese flying squirrel, is endemic to eastern Hebei Province and the suburbs of Beijing in North China and northern Sichuan. The complex-toothed flying squirrel is endemic to southern China.

Ground squirrels, rock squirrels, marmots and chipmunks belong to the same tribe within the squirrel family.

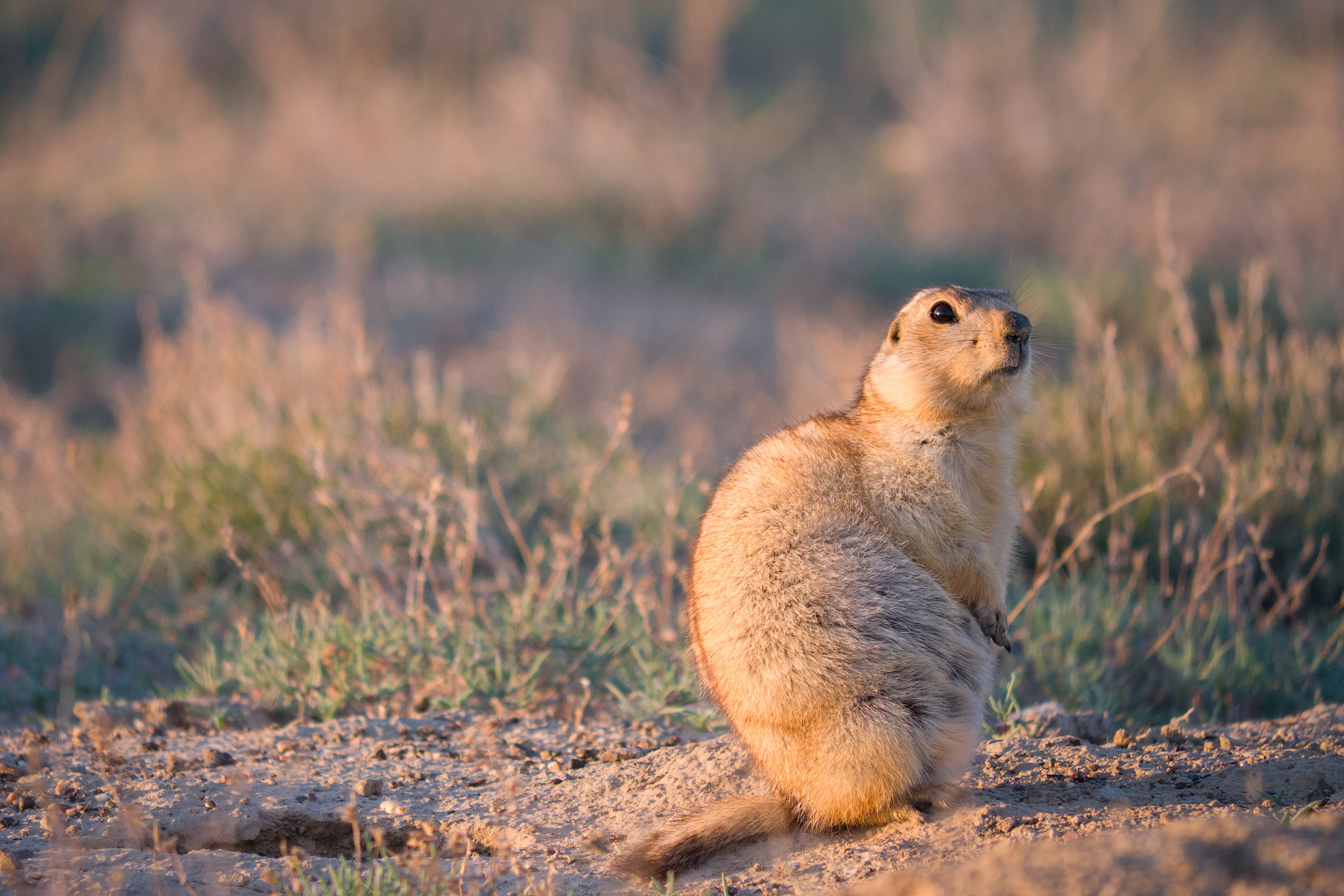
Yellow ground squirrel

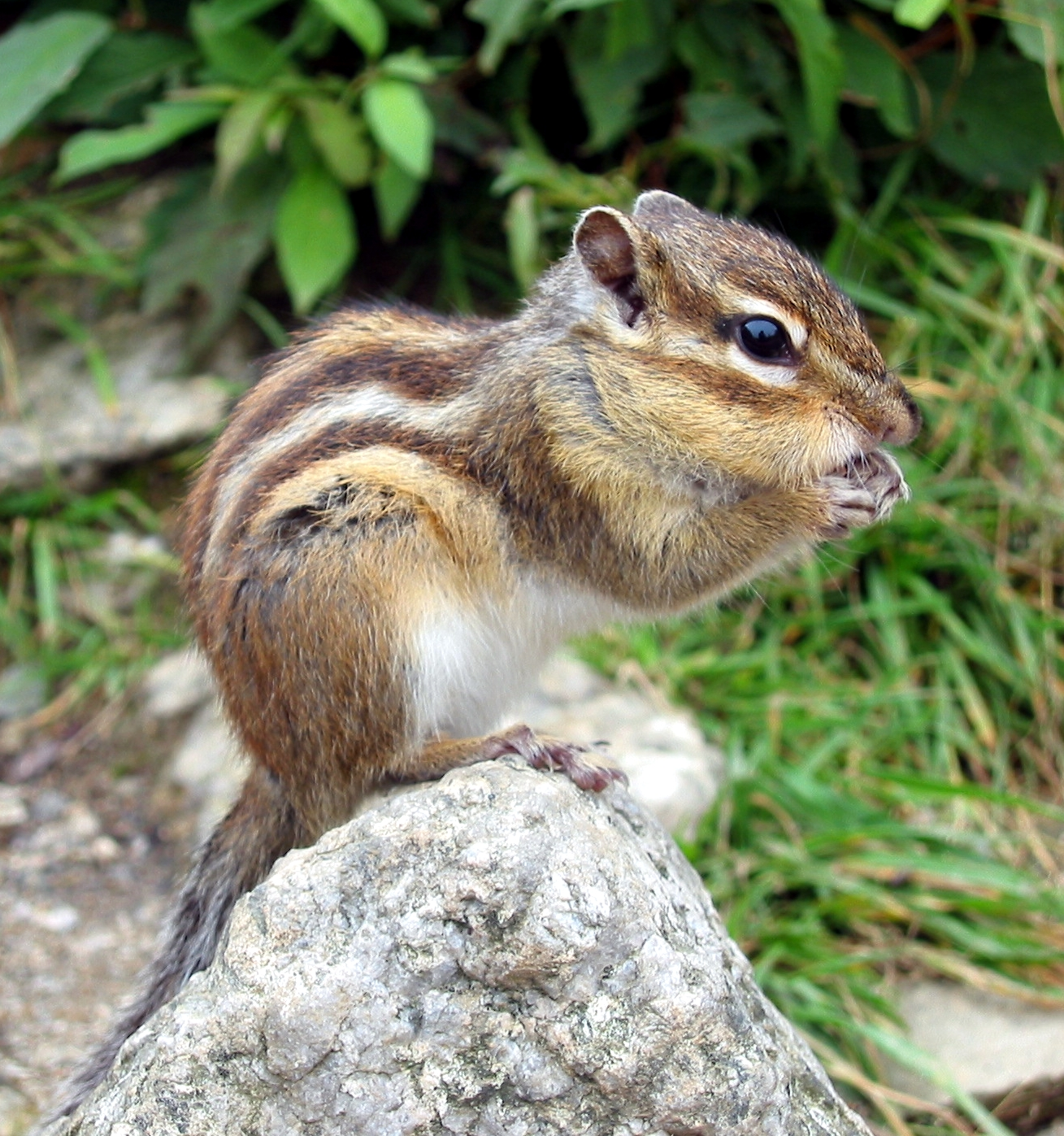
Siberian chipmunk

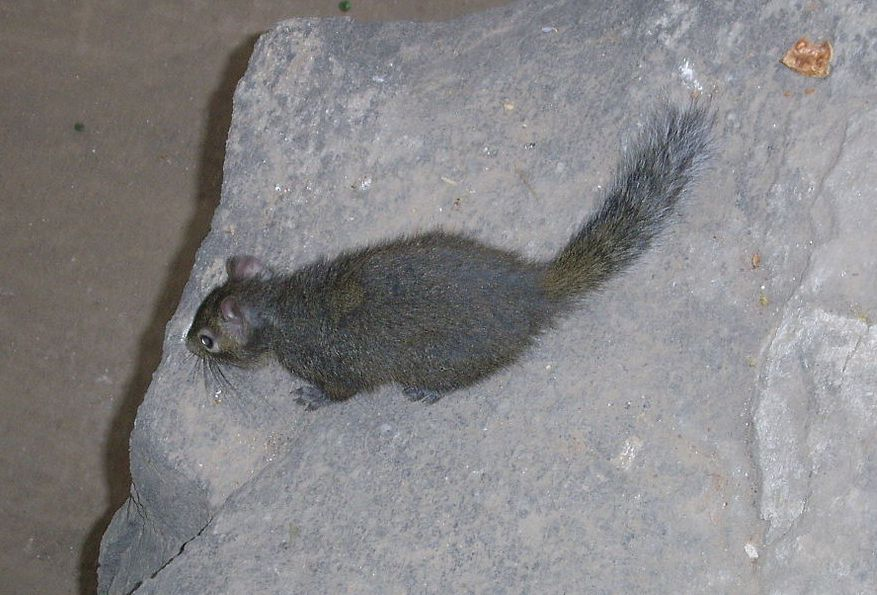
Père David's rock squirrel at the Summer Palace in Beijing

In China, ground squirrels are found in arid regions of the north and west where the animals live in burrows. Ground squirrel species include the Alashan, Daurian, red-cheeked, long-tailed and yellow ground squirrel.

Two species of rock squirrels are endemic to China, the Père David's rock squirrel, which is found across a wide swath of the country from the mountains around Beijing to Gansu and Sichuan, and the Forrest's rock squirrel, found only in the mountains dividing the Yangtze and Mekong River watershed in northwestern Yunnan.

The Siberian chipmunk, the only chipmunk species found outside North America, has six subspecies in China, all in northern parts of the country. The animal is raised as pets and for its tender flesh, fine fur and ingredients for traditional Chinese medicine.

The marmot, called hanta in Chinese for "land" or "dry otter", is related to ground squirrels but are bigger, have shorter tails and are more social animals. They can grow to be the size of a cat and live in large colonies. Four species are found in China, all along the northern and western periphery of the country: gray, long-tailed, Himalayan, and Tarbagan. Of these, the tarbagan marmot is an endangered, Class III protected species. Marmots are also farm-raised for food and fur.

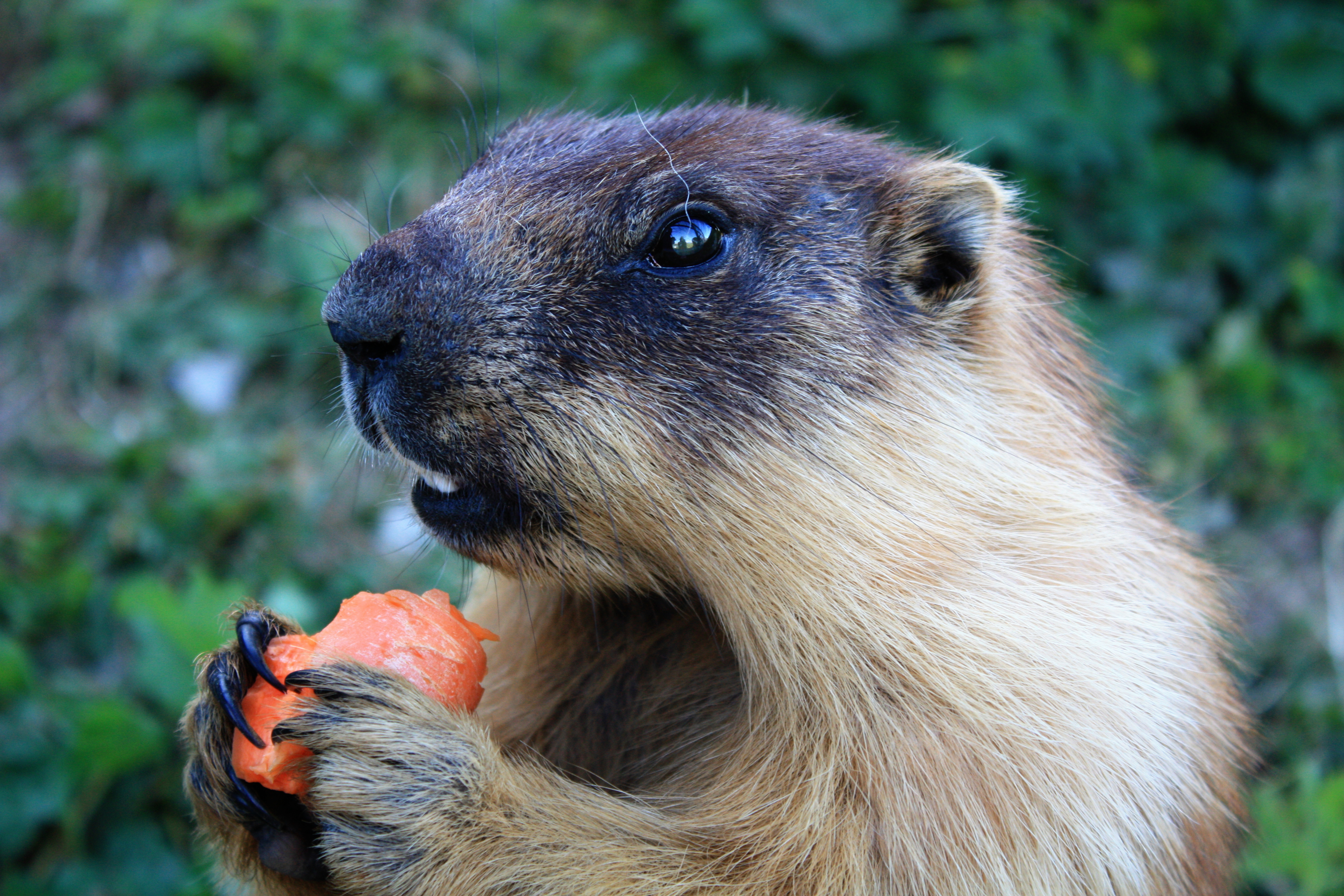
Tarbagan marmot

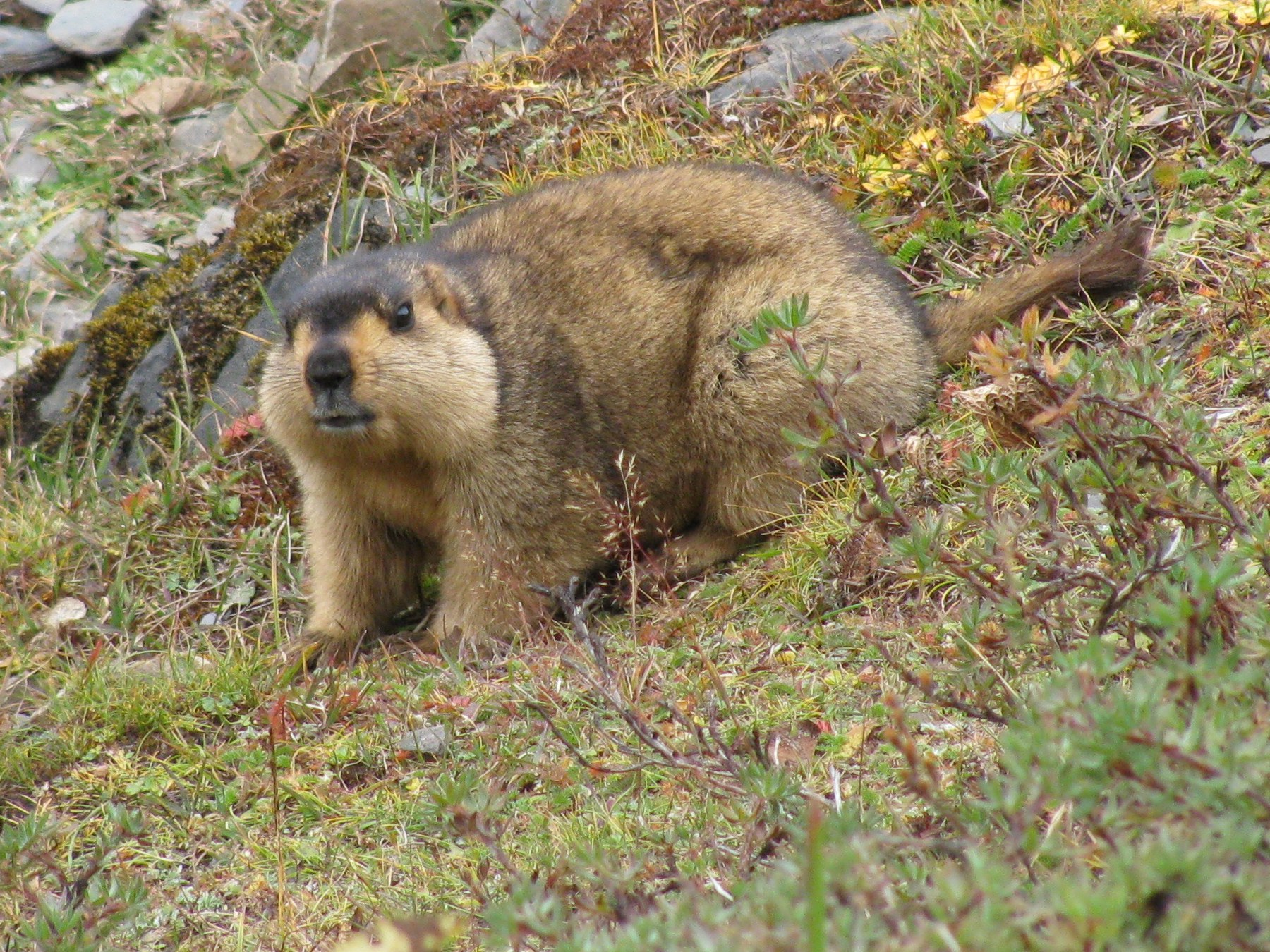
Himalayan marmot

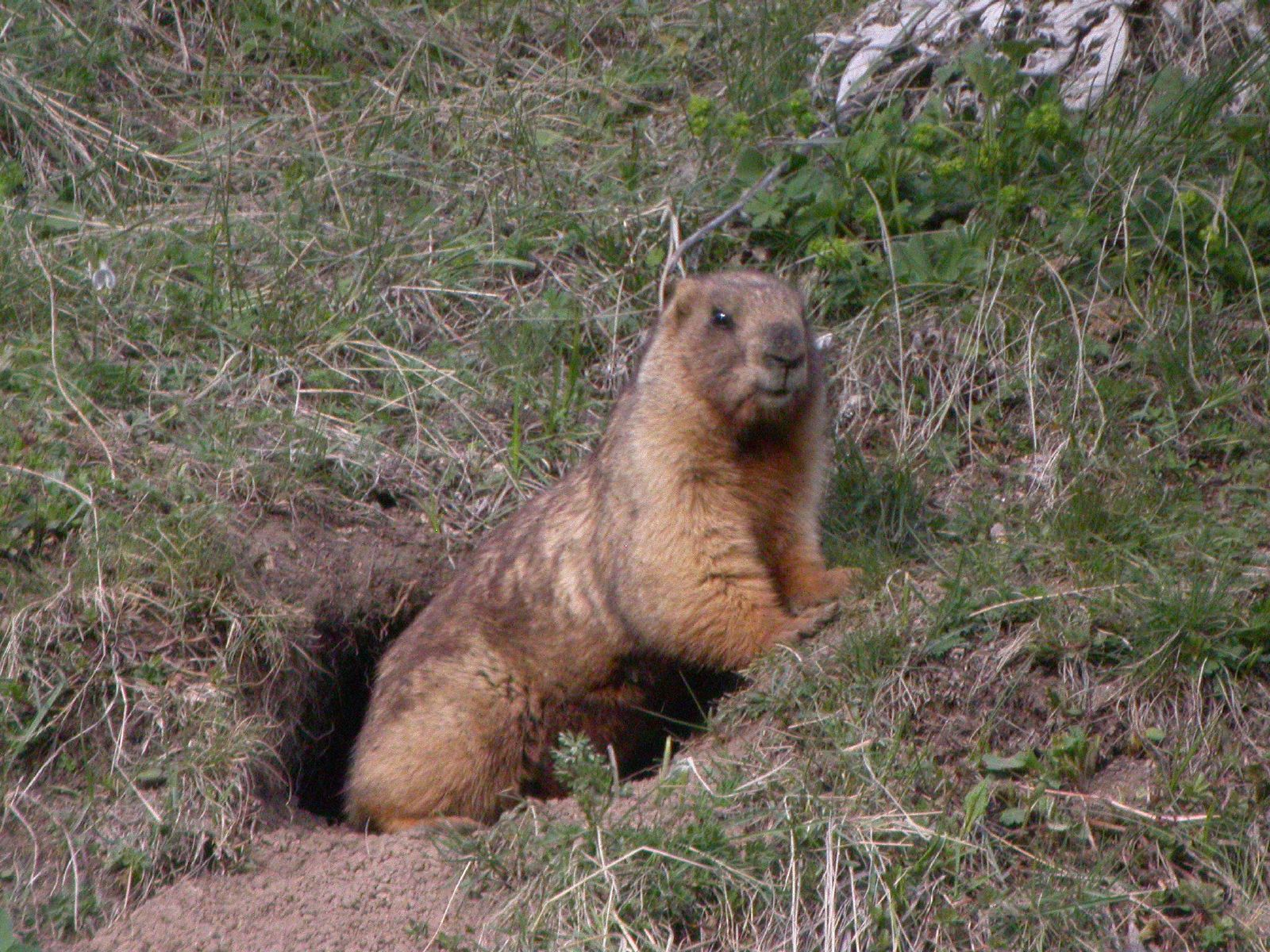
Gray marmot

==== Jumping rodents ====
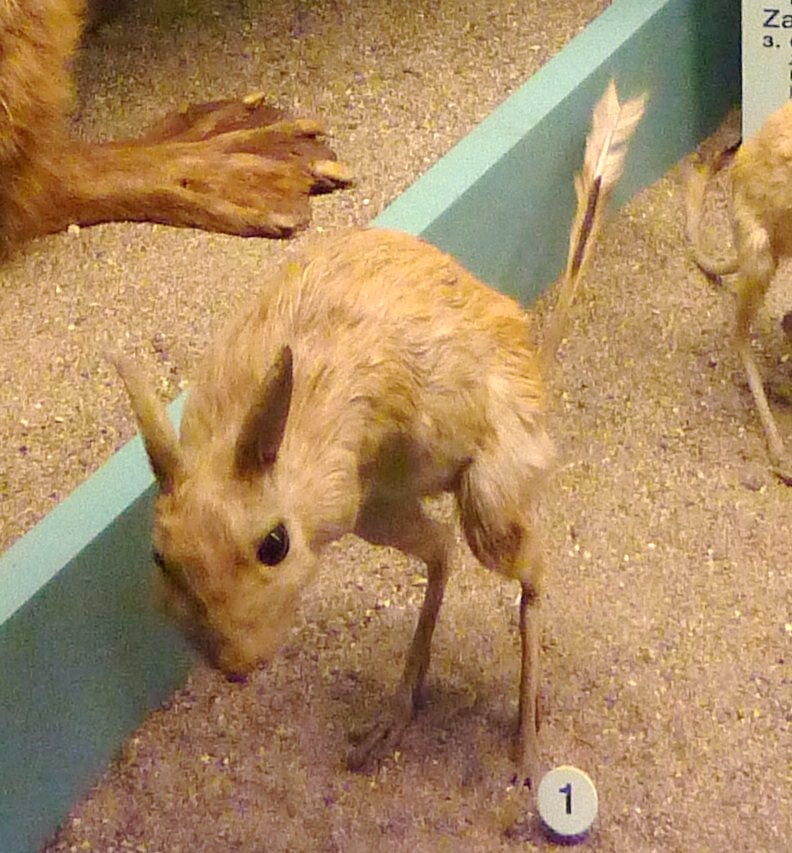
Mongolian five-toed jerboa

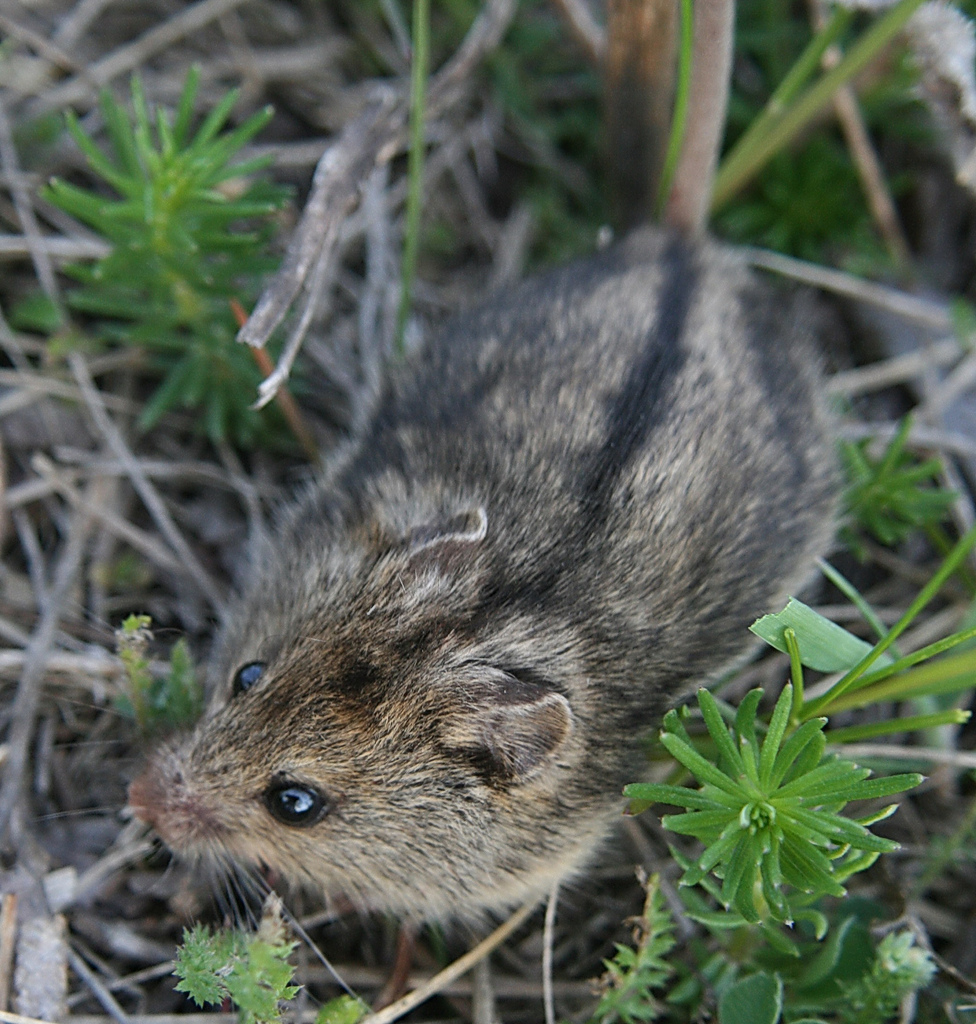
Southern birch mouse

A wide variety of jumping rodents belonging to the family Dipodidae can be found in China. These include jerboas and jumping mice, called tiaoshu, the "jumping rodent", and the birch mouse, called jueshu, the "falling rodent" or "stomping rodent". Jerboas, jumping mice, and birch mice all have long hind legs which can be used to make leaps from a bipedal stance.

==== Zokors, bamboo rats ====
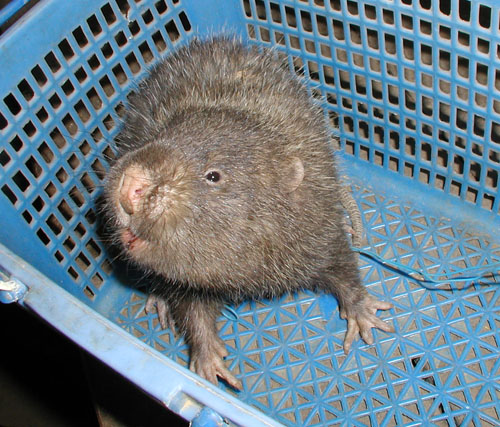
Lesser bamboo rat

Zokors and bamboo rats are chubby and furry rodents with short limbs that burrow underground.

Zokors have strong front limbs for digging. Zokor bones are used in traditional Chinese medicine and can substitute tiger bones. The Chinese zokor, Rothschild's zokor and Smith's zokor are endemic to China. The range of the Chinese zokor extends across north China from Qinghai to Beijing while that of the Rothschild's and Smith's zokors are confined to Gansu, Shaanxi, Hubei and Qinghai. The false zokor and Transbaikal zokor are found along China's border region with Russia and Mongolia.

All four bamboo rat species in the world are found in China: the Chinese bamboo rat south of the Yangtze, hoary bamboo rat in southwest China, large bamboo rat in Xishuangbanna in southern Yunnan and lesser bamboo rat and western Yunnan. The large bamboo rat can weigh as much as 5 kg. The flesh of the bamboo rat is rich in protein and low in fat. Bamboo rat oil can be used to treat burn wounds.

Both the zokor and bamboo rat are farm-raised for their fur, meat and use in medicine.

==== Hamsters ====
About half of the world's 25 species of hamsters are found in China. Most live in the deserts of Xinjiang, Gansu and Inner Mongolia. Some are named after the specific region in which they are found, such as the Chinese, Mongolian, Gansu, Chinese striped, Tibetan dwarf, Kham dwarf, and Djungarian hamster, and some by their founder, such as Campbell's dwarf, Roborovski, and Sokolov's dwarf. Others include the gray dwarf, long-tailed dwarf, greater long-tailed hamster and black-bellied hamster. The Chinese hamster and Roborovski hamster have been bred as pets and found in homes throughout the world.

- Eurasian water vole (Arvicola amphibius)

==== Mice and rats ====
- Brown rat
- Chinese dormouse (Chaetocauda sichuanensis)
- Sichuan niviventer (Niviventer excelsior)
- Yunnan hadromys (Hadromys yunnanensis)

==== Gerbils ====
- Great gerbil (Rhombomys opimus)

==== Shrew moles ====
- Chinese mole shrew (Anourosorex squamipes)

=== Pikas ===
- Glover's pika (Ochotona gloveri)

=== Moles ===
- Large mole (Mogera robusta)

=== Gymnures ===
- Northern short-tailed gymnure (Hylomys peguensis)

=== Treeshrews ===
- Northern treeshrew (Tupaia belangeri)

=== Hedgehogs ===
The Amur hedgehog (Erinaceus amurensis) hails from Manchuria, China.

=== Hares ===
- Chinese hare (Lepus sinensis)
- Hainan hare
- Manchurian hare

=== Bats ===
Bats, the only mammals capable of sustained flight, are the second largest order of mammals after rodents. They are divided broadly into microbats, which use echolocation to navigate and hunt insects, and megabats, which rely on large eyes and keen smell to feed on fruits and nectar. Bats are found in great abundance and variety throughout China and are considered to be auspicious animals, symbolizing good fortune. Bat feces collected from caves are used in traditional Chinese medicine.

==== Megabats ====
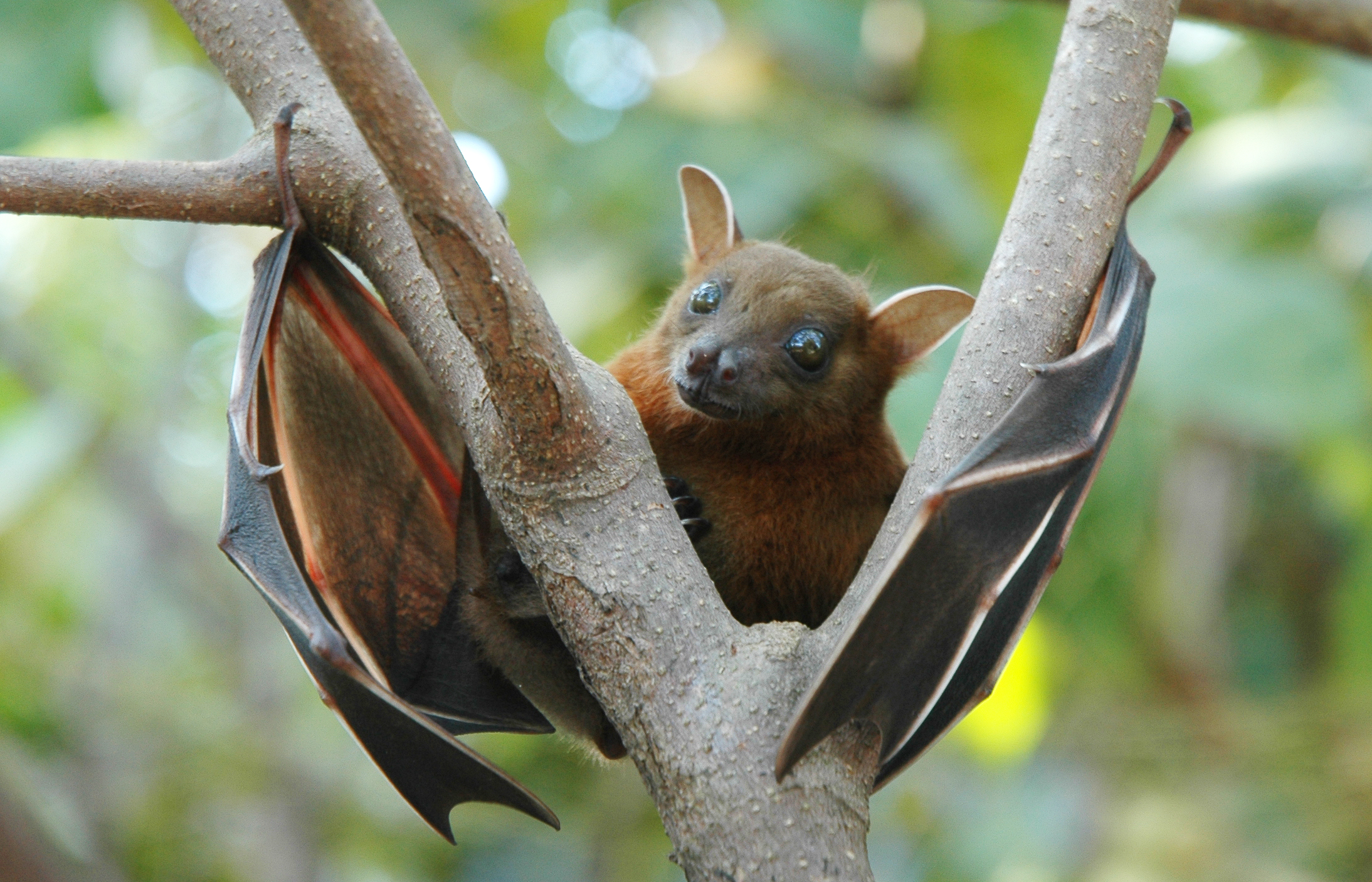
Lesser short-nosed fruit bat

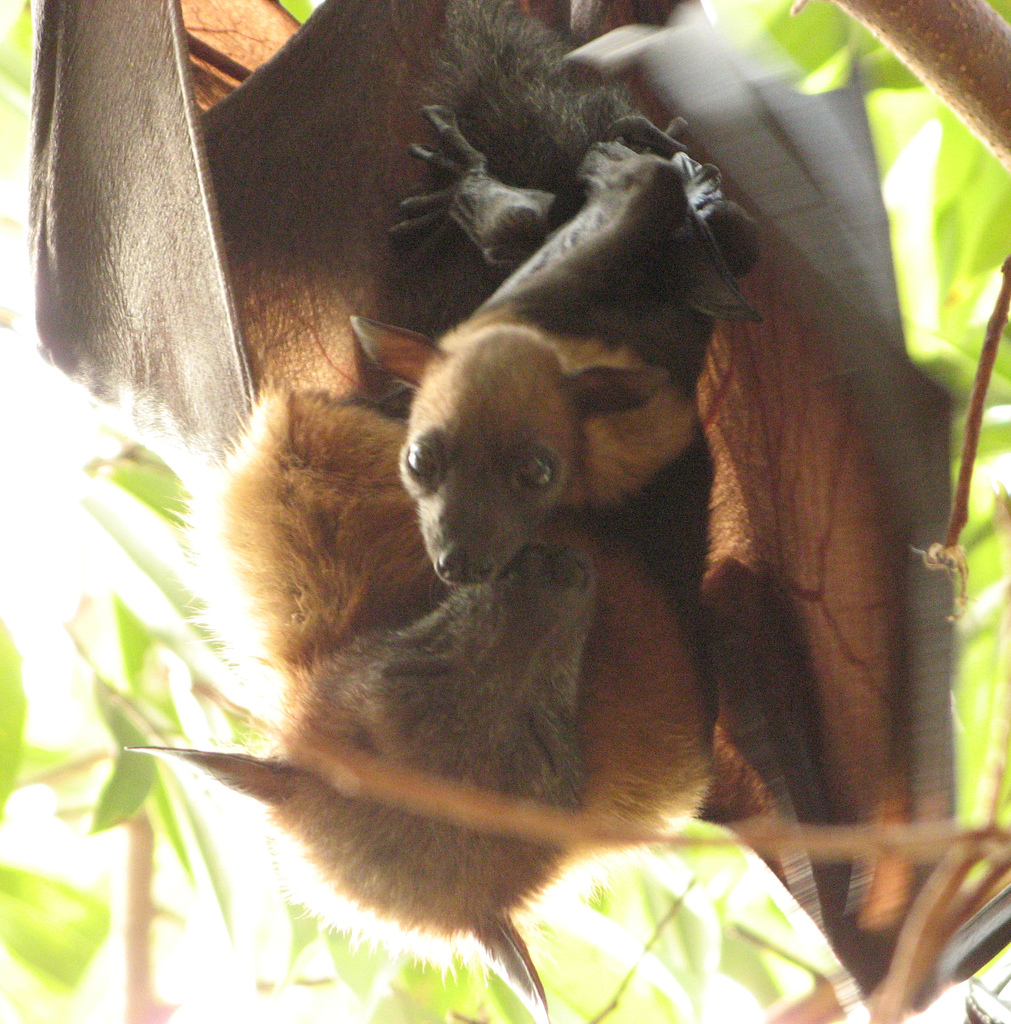
Lyle's flying foxes

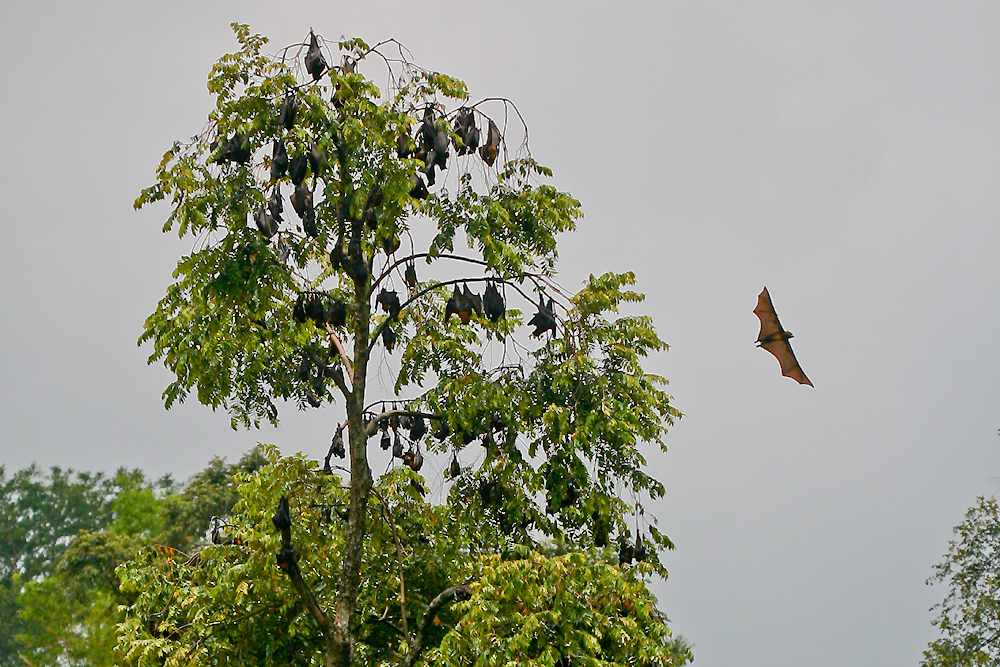
Large flying foxes

Megabats, also called fruit bats, include flying foxes, which are the largest bat species. Four species are found in China, all in isolated populations: the large flying fox in Shaanxi, Indian flying fox in Qinghai, Ryukyu flying fox in Taiwan, and Lyle's flying fox in Yunnan. The large flying fox can weigh 0.65–1.1 kg (1.4–2.4 lb) and has a wingspan of up to 1.5 m (4 ft 11 in).

Geoffroy's rousette and Leschenault's rousette, both dog-faced fruit bats, are the only megabats in China that can echolocate. Unlike microbats, which generate ultrasound with their larynx, rousettes generate sonar sound waves with tongue clicks.

Other fruit bat species include the greater and lesser short-nosed fruit bat, Blanford's fruit bat and the cave nectar bat. Fruit bats are sometimes considered pests by fruit farmers, and are hunted and eaten in parts of Guangdong, Guangxi and Hainan. They also help pollinate certain species of tropical fruit trees.

==== Microbats ====
===== Vesper bats =====
Vesper or evening bats comprise the largest family of bats with at least 45 species in China. Members include mouse-eared bats, long-eared bats, pipistrelles, noctules and barbastelles.

Mouse-eared bats

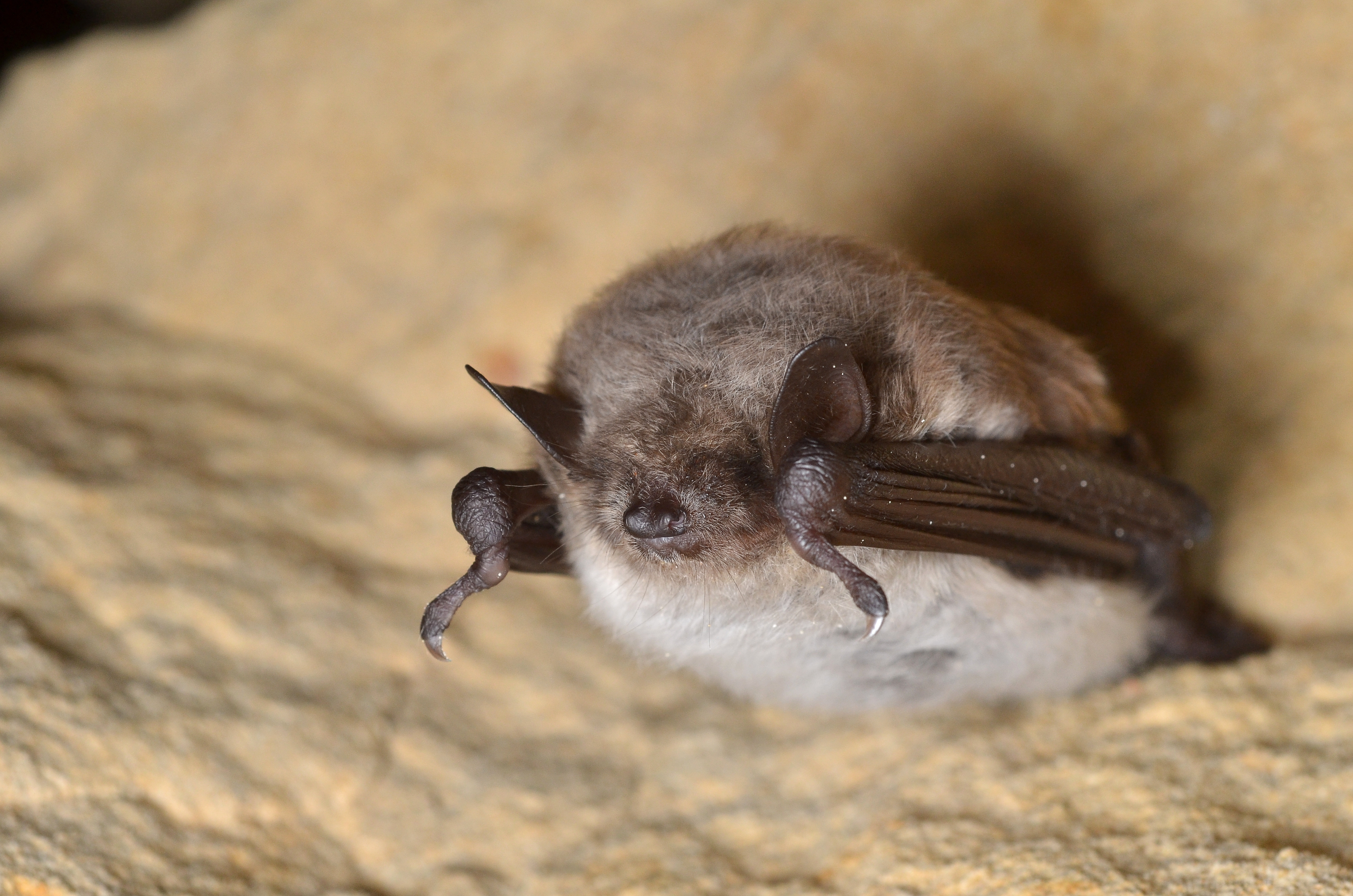
Pond bat

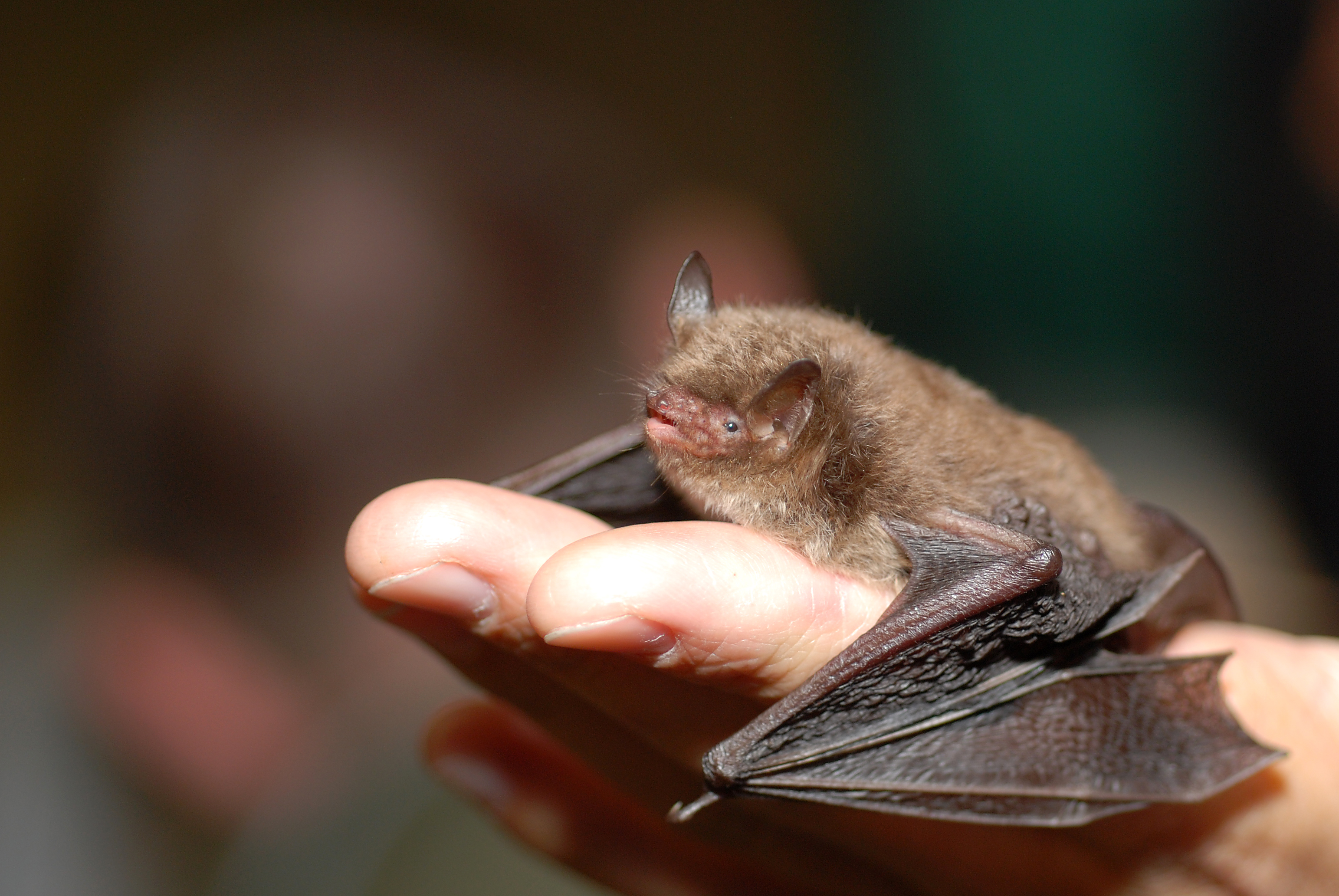
Daubenton's bat

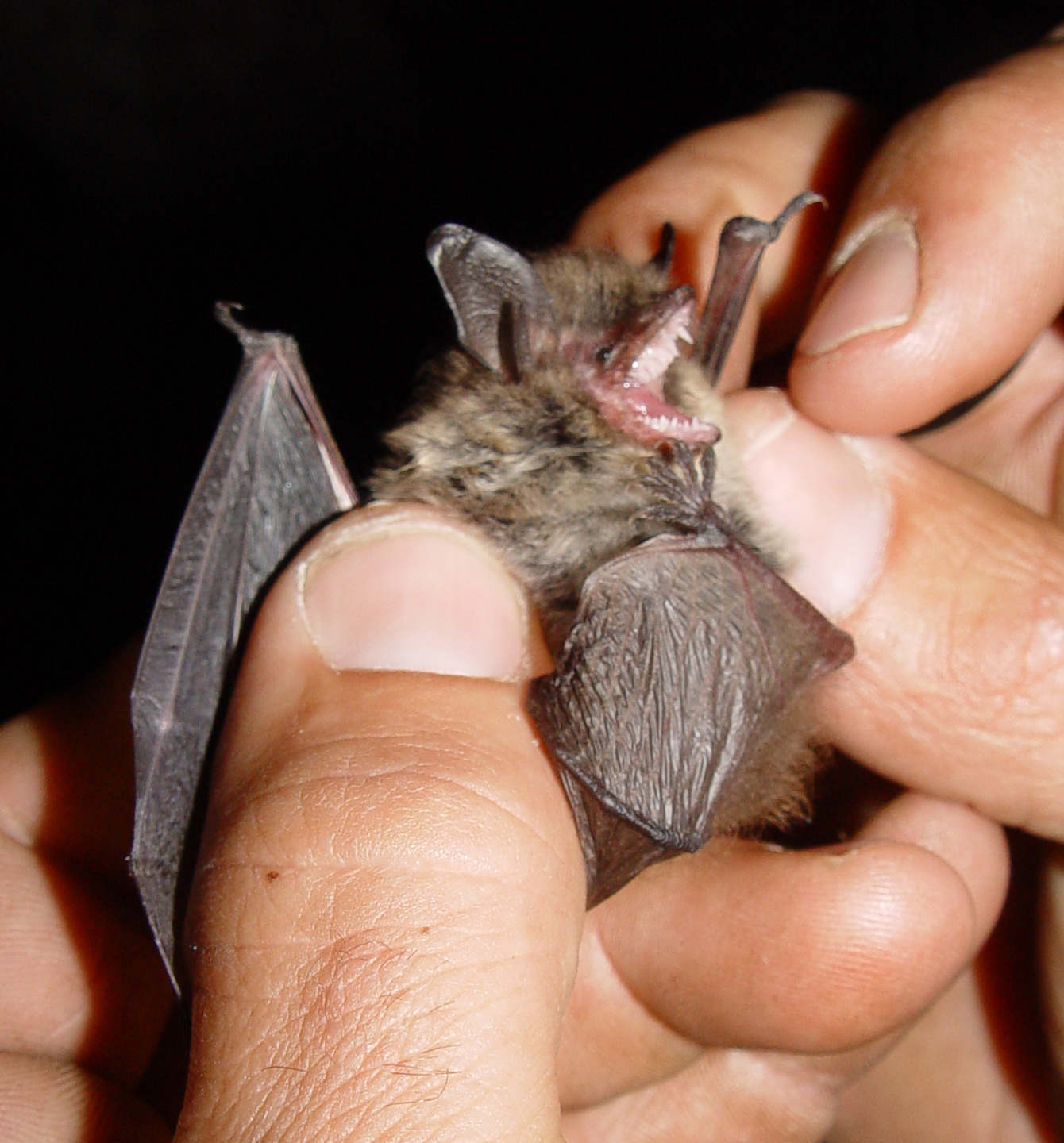
Whiskered bat

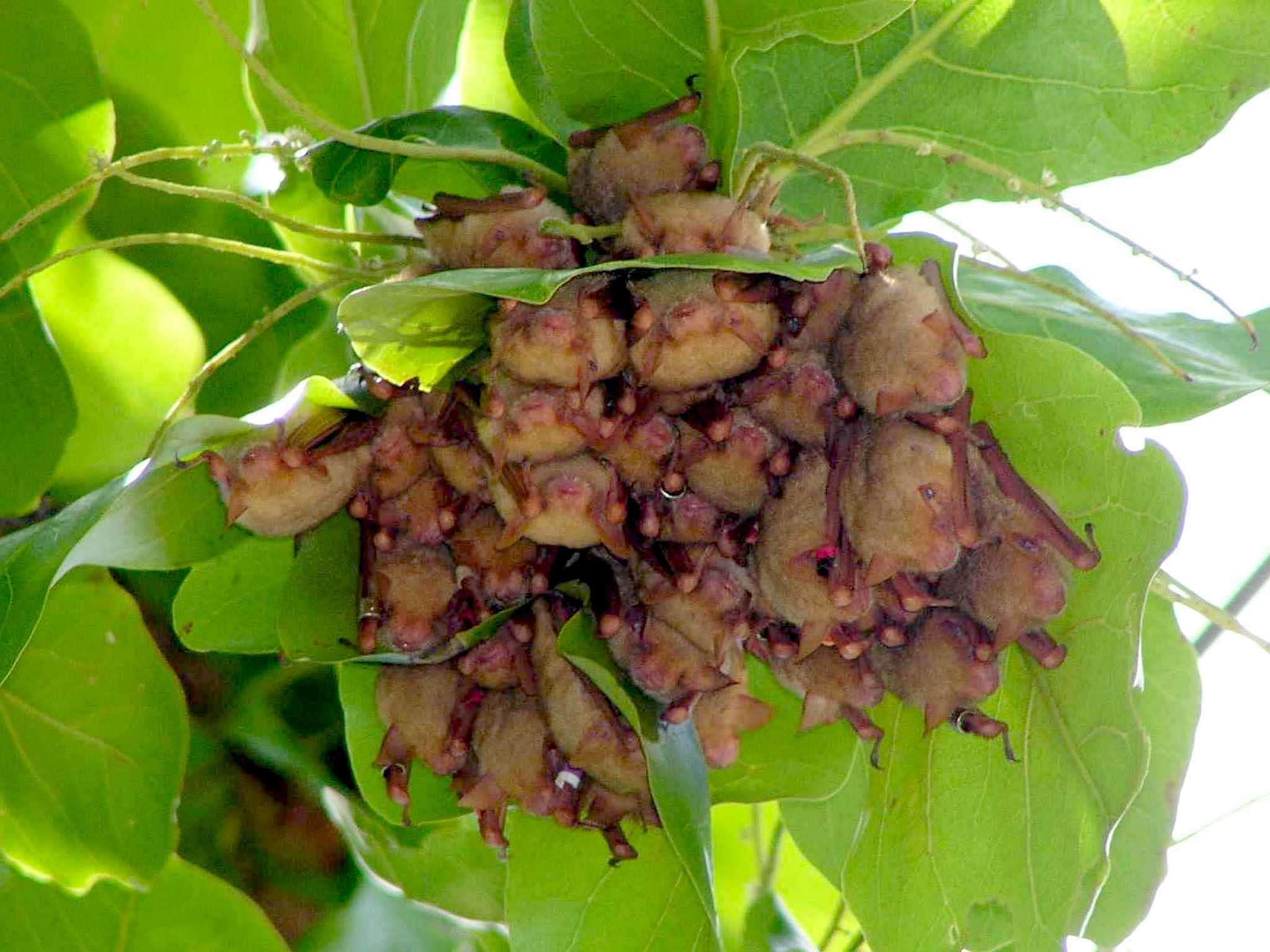
Hodgson's bats

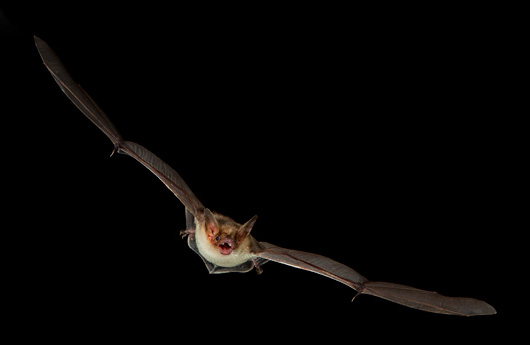
Lesser mouse-eared bat

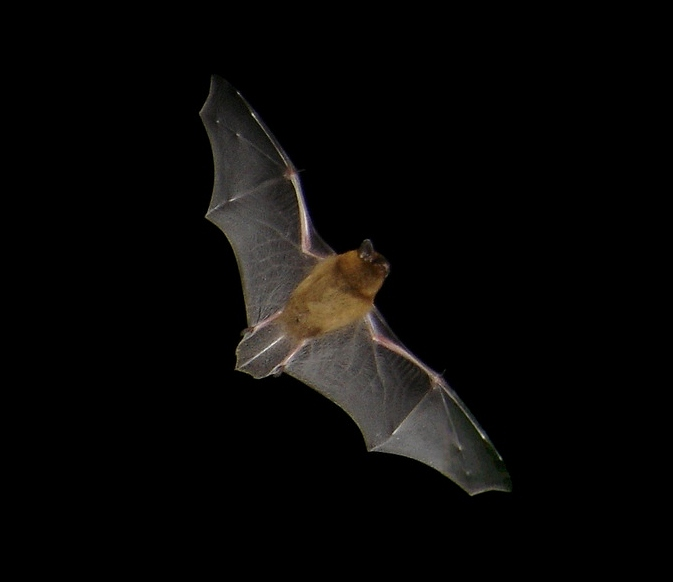
Common pipistrelle

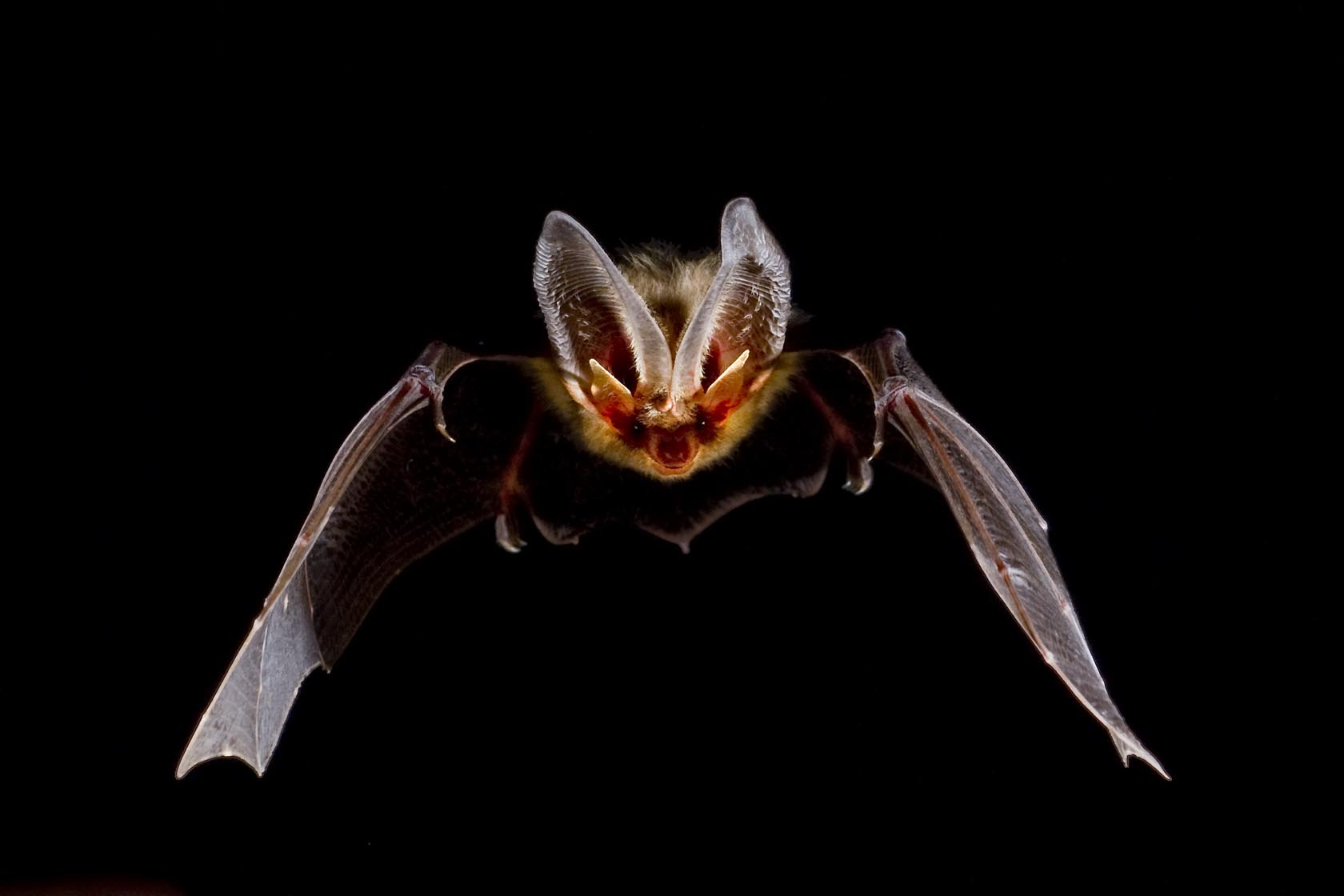
Brown long-eared bat

Myotis or mouse-eared bats are delicate and furry bats with pointed ears. Of the 90 or so species in the world, about one-fifth are found in China.

The lesser mouse-eared bat, pond bat, Daubenton's bat, Natterer's bat and whiskered bat are spread across Eurasia. Others inhabit either the warmer climes of southern China and Southeast Asia including the large myotis, Szechwan myotis, Burmese whiskered bat and Horsfield's bat or the temperate regions of northern China and Northeast Asia including the Far Eastern myotis, fraternal myotis, and Ikonnikov's bat. Hodgson's bat, known for its distinctive golden fur, has unconnected populations in Afghanistan, India, central China, southeastern China, Manchuria, Taiwan, Korea and Indonesia. The Beijing mouse-eared bat is endemic to eastern China, and the long-footed myotis is endemic to southern China and Hong Kong.

Most mouse-eared bats are insectivores. Rickett's big-footed bat, which is distributed across China proper into Laos, lives near water and feeds on fish. The large-footed bat of Taiwan hunts insects on the surface of the water.

Pipistrels and their relatives are tiny bats that flutter like butterflies in flight. The common pipistrelle weighs only 3.5 to 8.5 g (0.12 to 0.30 oz) and has a wingspan ranging of 18 to 25 cm (7.1 to 9.8 in). Other pipistrelles found in China include the least pipistrelle, Kelaart's, Mount Popa, Savi's, chocolate black-gilded and the Chinese pipistrelle. In Chinese, pipistrelles are called fuyi meaning "hidden wing". The flesh, blood, brain and feces of pipistrelle can be used to make traditional Chinese medicine. The brain is applied to the skin to treat acne and ingested to improve memory.

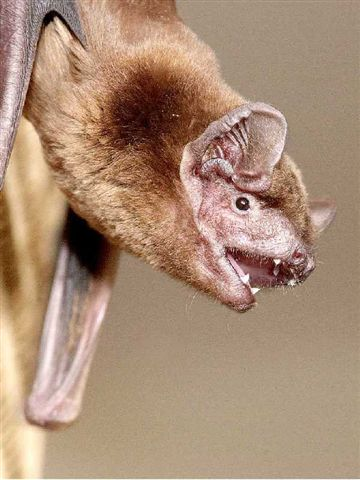
Common noctule

Noctules are closely related to pipistrelles but can be much larger in size. The Chinese noctule, which is endemic to the southern half of the country and Taiwan, weighs three to four times as much as the Chinese pipistrelle. Known as "mountain bats" in Chinese, noctules live in caves and rock croppings as well as the under the eaves of traditional homes. Noctules droppings are collected for medicinal uses. Other noctule bats in China include the common noctule, lesser noctule, and birdlike noctule.

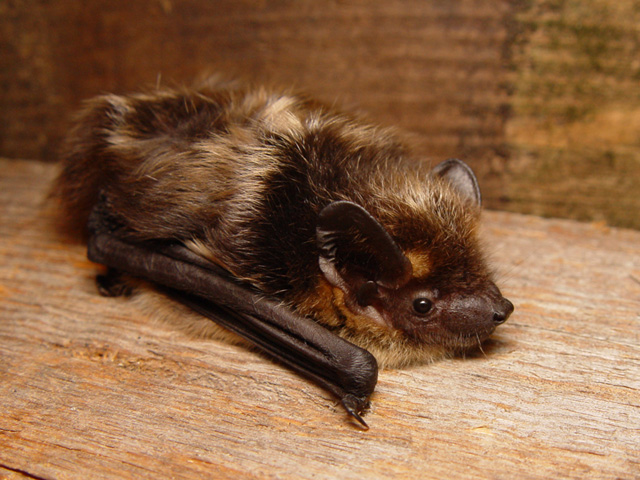

Barbastelles are called wide-eared bats in Chinese. The range of the Asian barbastelle extends from Egypt through China to Japan. In 2001, a Chinese zoologist discovered a new species of barbastelle in the mountains of rural Beijing. This bat was discovered in a cave in Fangshan District where four other bat species—Rickett's big-foot, large mouse-eared, greater horseshoe and greater tube-nosed bats also live. The Beijing barbastelle (Barbastella beijingensis) was distinguished by the distinctiveness of its DNA and recognized as a species on 23 May 2007, the 300th birthday of Carl Linnaeus. As of 2012, no other populations of this species have been found beyond Beijing.

Long-eared bats have enormous ears that can grow almost as long as their bodies, and are represented in China by multiple species (e.g. Plecotus kozlovi and Plecotus ognevi). The greater and lesser bamboo bats prefer to roost inside the hollow shoots of giant bamboo through holes eaten by beetles. Because the holes are small, bamboo bats are also tiny. An adult lesser bamboo bat that measures 4 cm (1.6 in) in length and weighs 3.5 to 5.8 g (0.12 to 0.20 oz), is not much bigger than a bumble bee.

House bats including the Gobi big brown bat, northern bat, thick-eared bat, serotine bat are also closely related to pipistrelles, noctules and barbastelles. Other relatives within this extensive subfamily include Tickell's bat, great evening bat, harlequin bat, greater Asiatic yellow bat, parti-colored bat and Asian particolored bat.

Tube-nosed bats have longer nostrils than other vespers and funnel-shaped ears. Chinese species include the greater, little, round-eared, Hutton's, and dusky tube-nosed bat. The dusky tube-nosed bat is endemic to Heilongjiang and Jilin in northeastern China. The greater tube-nosed bat of Beijing feeds on aerial beetles.

The painted bat and Hardwicke's woolly bat, also vesper bats, live in the forests of southern China.

===== Long-winged bats =====
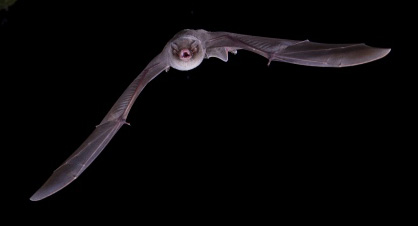
Common bent-wing bat

Long-winged bats in China include the common and western bent-winged bats. The common bent-wing bats can form large colonies and migrate hundreds of kilometers.

===== Free-tailed bats =====
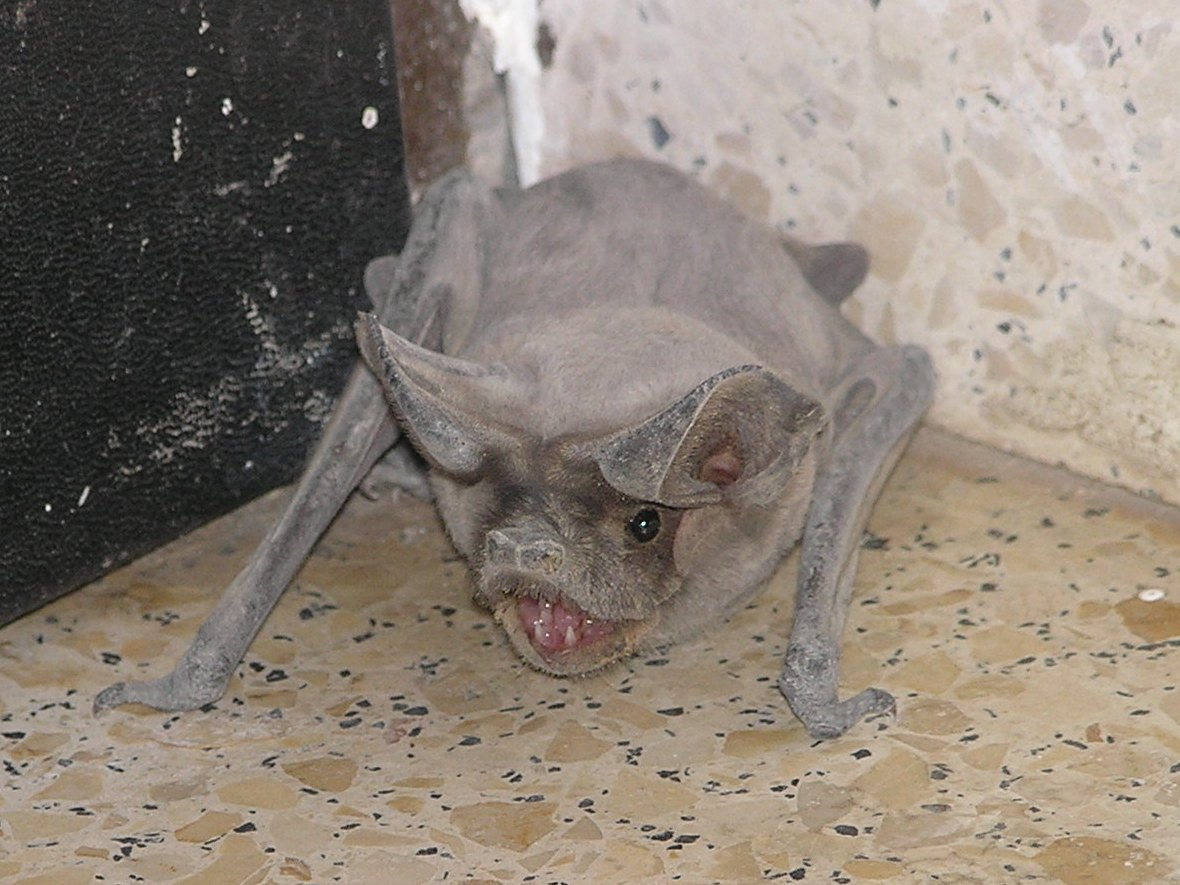
European free-tailed bat

Free-tailed bats, unlike other bats, have tails that are detached from their wing membrances. Species include the European free-tailed bat, La Touche's free-tailed bat and the wrinkle-lipped free-tailed bat.

===== False vampire =====
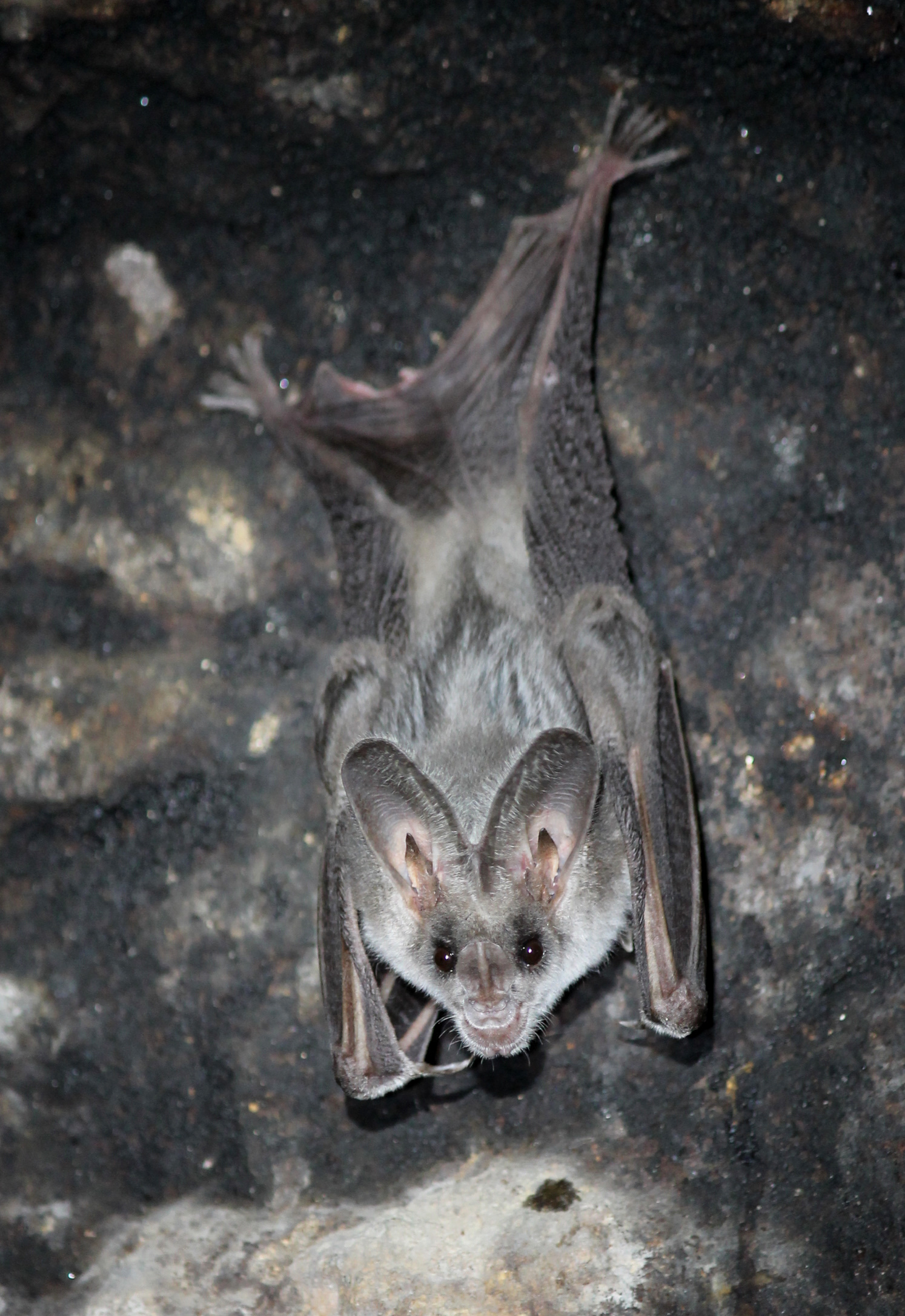
Greater false vampire bat

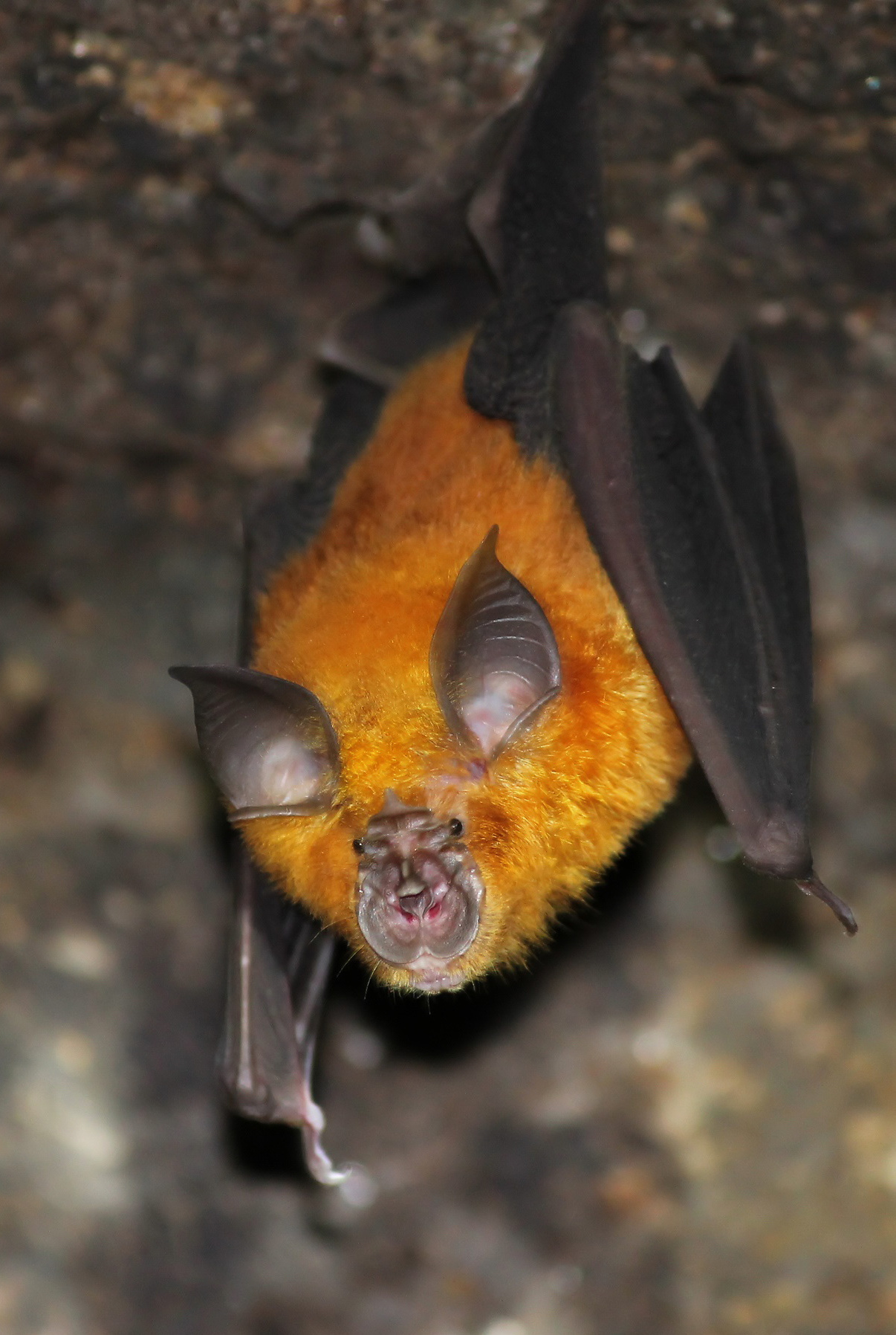
Rufous horseshoe bat

The greater false vampire bat of Guangxi is a carnivorous bat that feeds on rodents, fish, insects and smaller bats. It is smaller than the "true" vampire bats of South America.

===== Sac-winged bats =====
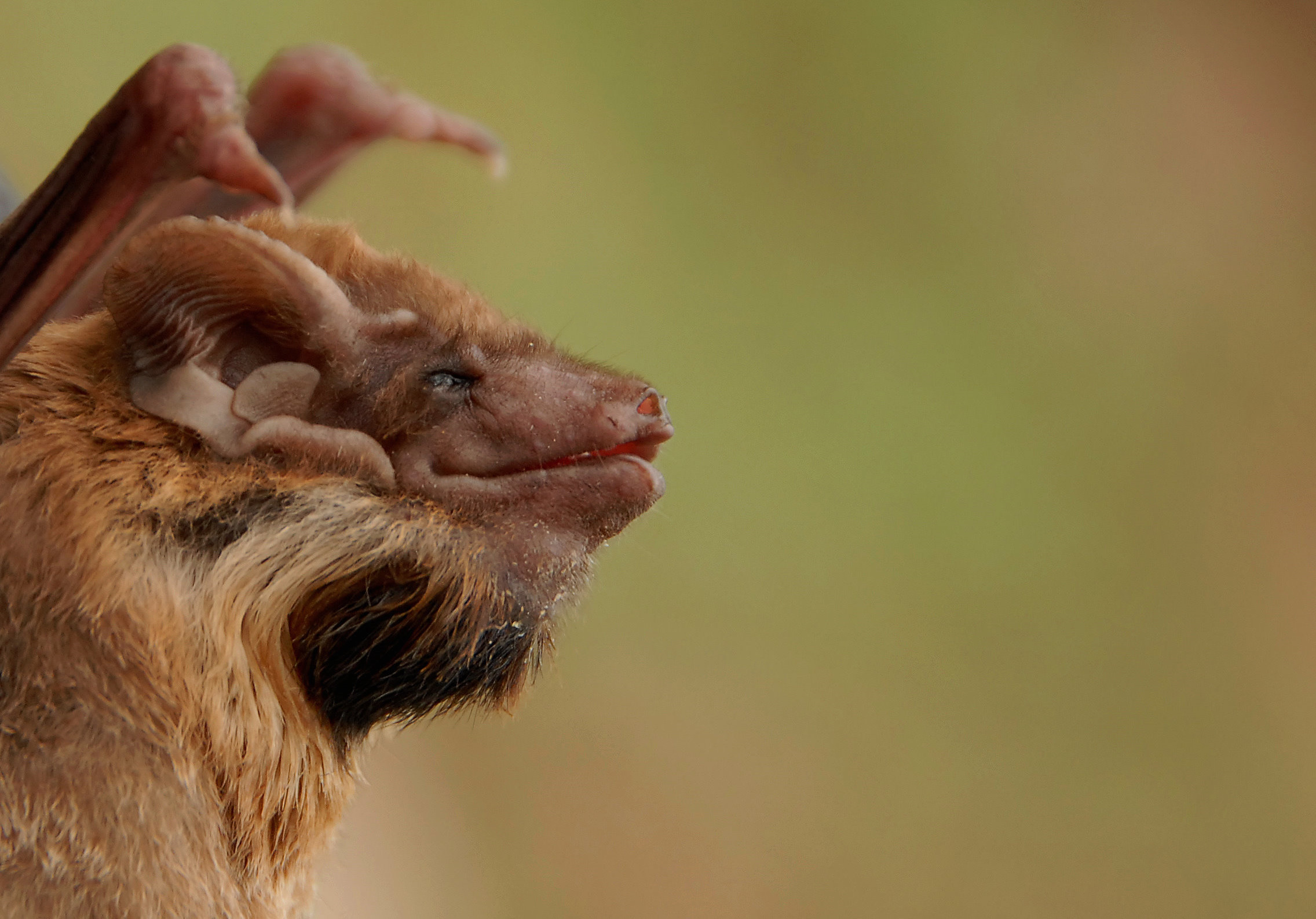
Black-bearded tomb bat

Sac-winged bats have sac-like glands under their wings that carry pheromones, which are released to attract mates. Out of some 51 sac-winged bat species in the world, only the black-bearded tomb bat is found in China.

===== Horseshoe bats =====
Horseshoe bats are called "chrysanthemum bats" in Chinese because they have horseshoe-shaped folds of skin that unfurl on their faces like the petals of a flower. These noseleaves help the horseshoe bat emit ultrasonic signals for echolocation. Species found in China include the greater, least, king, big-eared, rufous, Chinese rufous, little Japanese, Blyth's, Osgood's, Pearson's, Thomas's, and Dobson's. The king and Osgood's horseshoe bats are endemic to southwest China. Scientists believe that the SARS coronavirus may have originated in horseshoe bats in China.

Closely related to the horseshoe bats are the roundleaf bats, including the great roundleaf, intermediate roundleaf, Pomona and Pratt's, the East Asian tailless leaf-nosed bat and Stoliczka's trident bat.

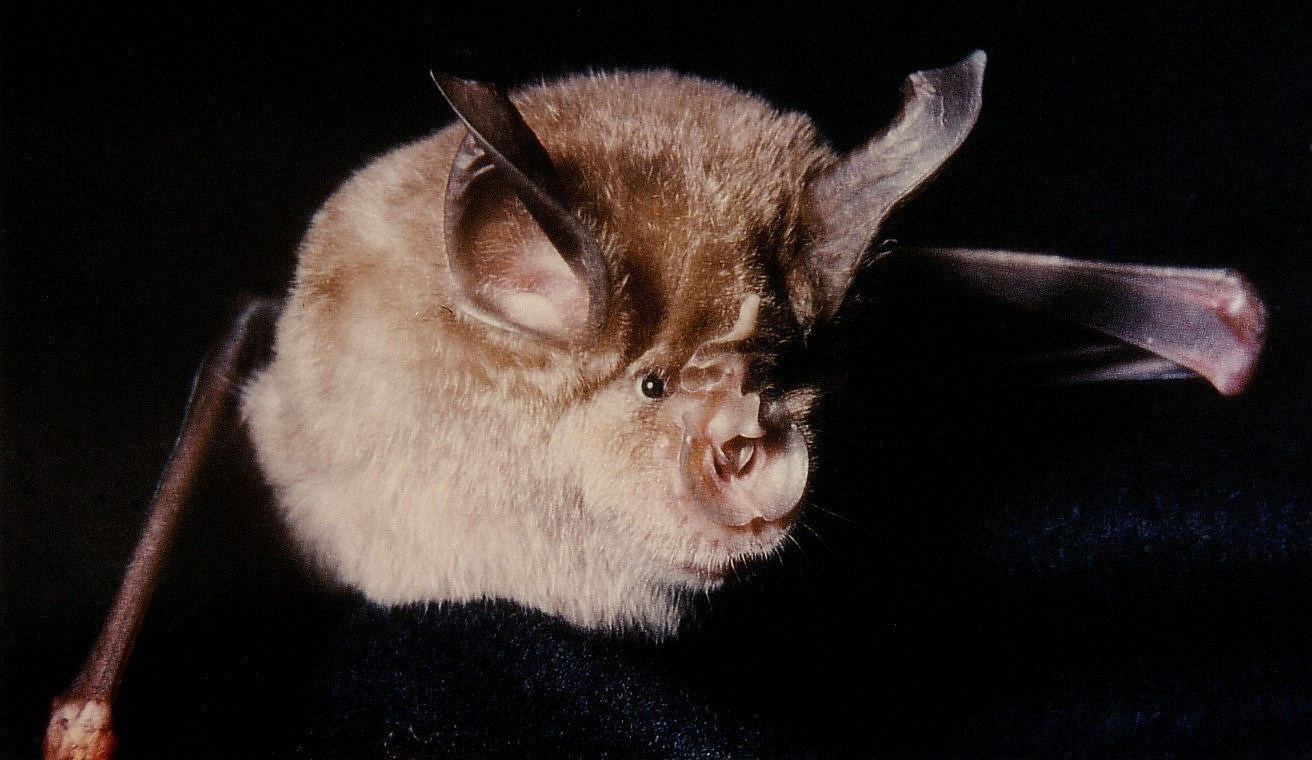
Greater horseshoe bat

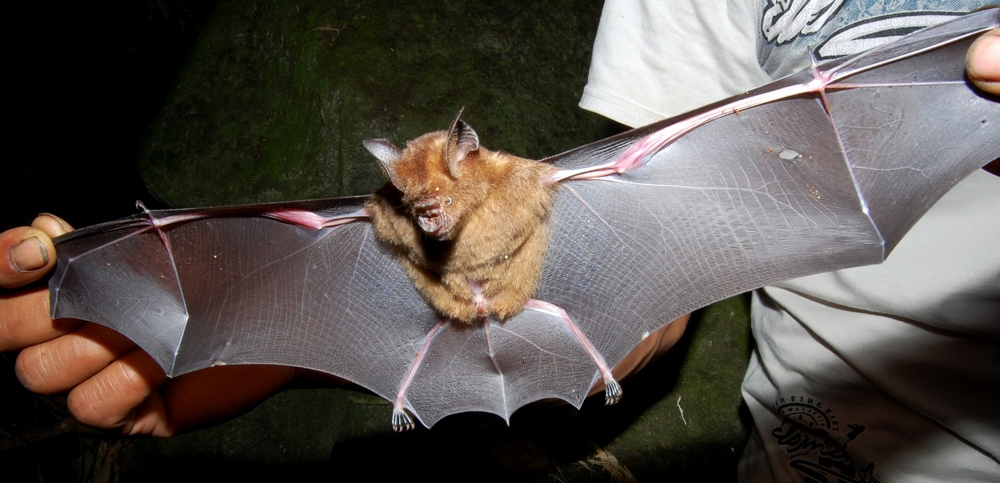
Intermediate roundleaf bat

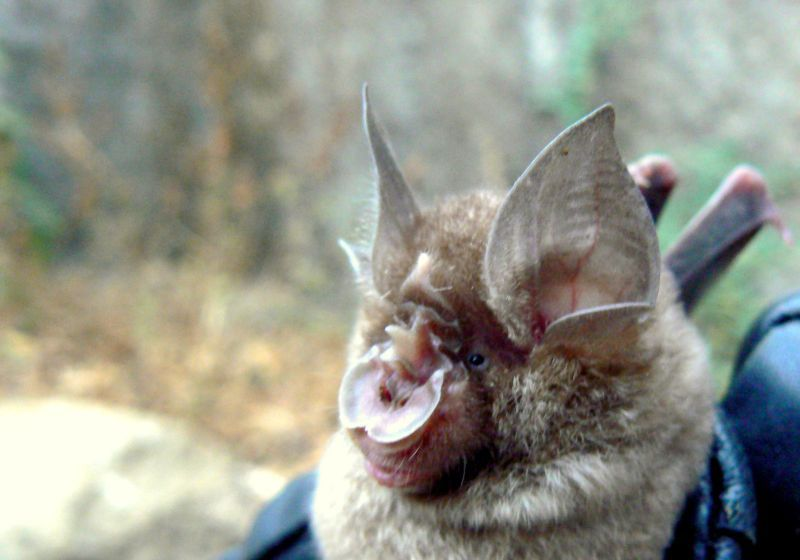
Blyth's horseshoe bat

== Birds ==
The avifauna of China includes a total of 1314 species, of which 52 are endemic, two have been introduced by humans, and 55 are rare or accidental. One species listed is extirpated in China and is not included in the species count. Eighty seven species are globally threatened.

=== Pheasants ===
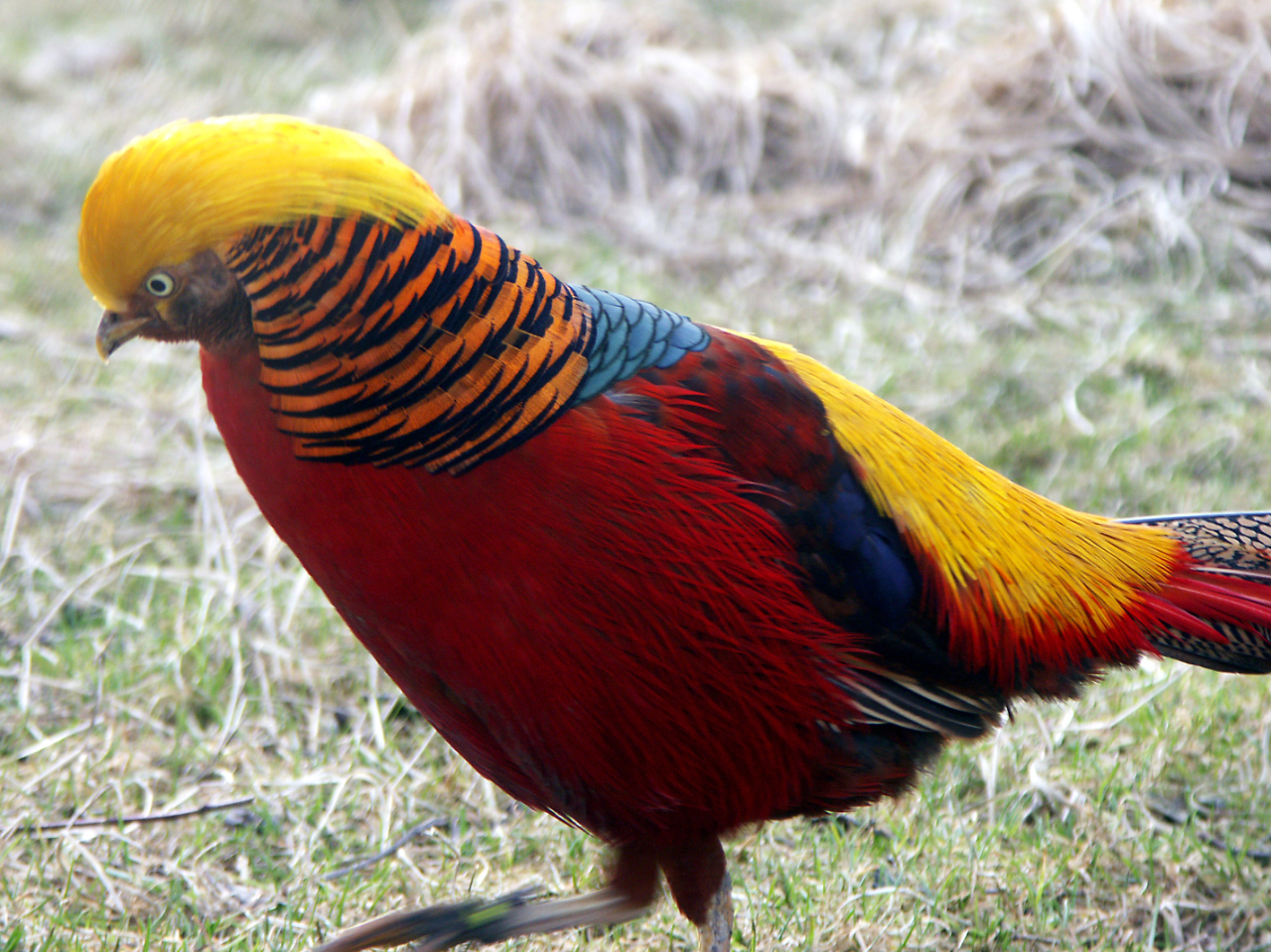
A golden pheasant

- Chinese monal
- Golden pheasant

=== Cranes and other wading birds ===
- Black-necked crane
- Red-crowned crane
- Common spoonbill

== Reptiles ==
China has a big variety of reptiles including the Chinese alligator and the Yangtze giant softshell turtle.

=== Crocodilians ===
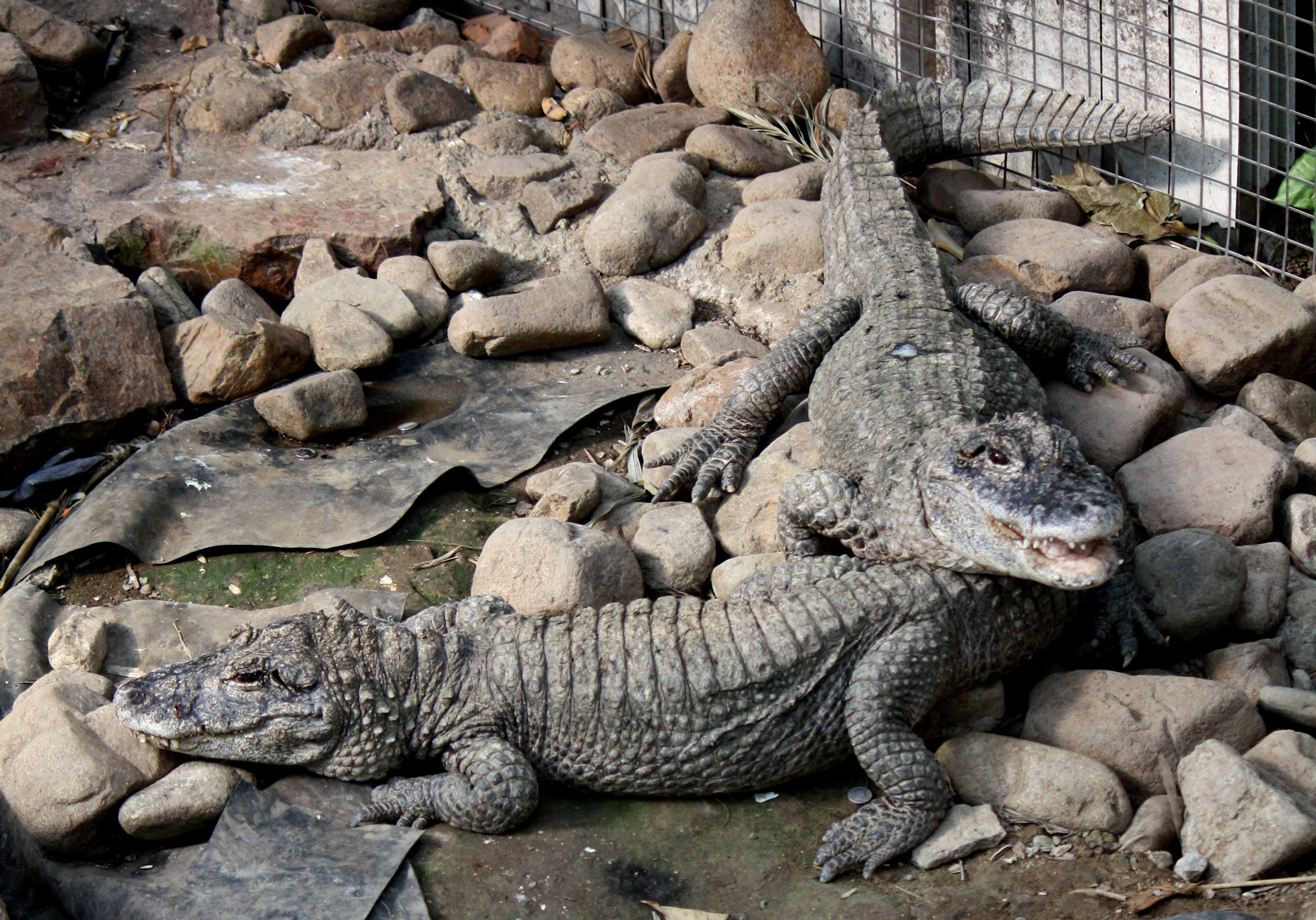
A pair of Chinese alligators in their habitat at the Shanghai Zoo

- Chinese alligator (Alligator sinensis)

=== Lizards ===
- Chinese crocodile lizard (Shinisaurus crocodilurus)
- Chinese water dragon (Physignathus cocincinus)

=== Turtles and tortoises ===
- Elongated tortoise (Indotestudo elongata)
- Cantor's giant softshell turtle (Pelochelys cantorii)
- Yangtze giant softshell turtle (Rafetus swinhoei)

=== Snakes ===
- Sharp-nosed pit viper (Deinagkistrodon acutus)
- Dice snake (Natrix tessellata)
- Twin-spotted ratsnake (Elaphe bimaculata)
- Mamushi (Gloydius blomhoffii)
- Grass snake (Natrix natrix)
- Mountain pitviper (Ovophis monticola)
- Jerdon's pit viper (Protobothrops jerdonii)
- Bamboo pit viper (Trimeresurus gramineus)
- Mangshan pitviper (Trimeresurus mangshanensis)
- Motuo bamboo pitviper (Trimeresurus medoensis)
- Stejneger's pit viper (Trimeresurus stejnegeri)

== Amphibians ==
China is home to 346 species of amphibian. China's amphibian diversity is greater than any other country in the Old World, and it is the 5th in the whole world. China's amphibian fauna includes an important element of widespread, generally non-threatened species though 27.3% of amphibian species are extinct or threatened and because conservation assessments of Chinese amphibians have only started recently, it is likely that the current data on threats to amphibians are insufficient. Several amphibian species in China have very limited geographical distributions.

=== Frogs ===
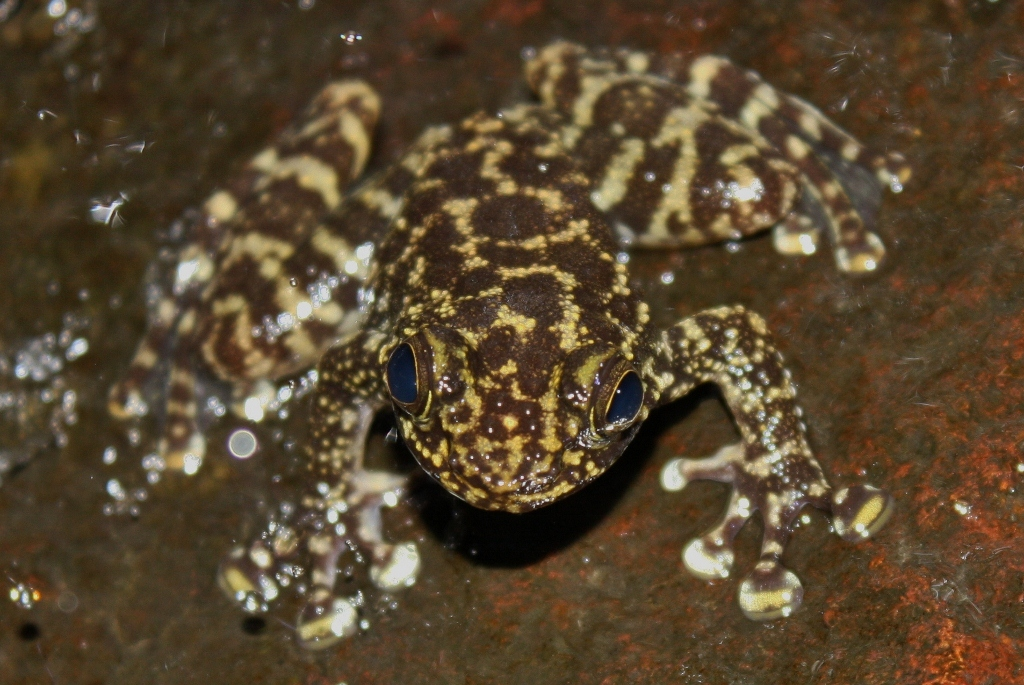
Amolops hongkongensis

==== True frogs (Ranidae) ====
- Amolops aniqiaoensis
- Amolops bellulus
- Amolops chunganensis
- Amolops gerbillus
- Amolops granulosus
- Amolops hainanensis
- Amolops jinjiangensis
- Amolops kangtingensis
- Amolops liangshanensis
- Amolops lifanensis
- Amolops loloensis
- Amolops mantzorum
- Amolops medogensis
- Amolops monticola
- Amolops ricketti
- Amolops torrentis
- Amolops viridimaculatus
- Amolops wuyiensis
- Babina adenopleura
- Babina hainanensis
- Babina lini
- Babina pleuraden
- Chevron-spotted brown frog
- Eastern golden frog
- Emei music frog
- Glandirana minima
- Glandirana tientaiensis
- Huanren frog
- Imienpo Station frog
- Johns' groove-toed frog
- Korean brown frog
- Odorrana andersonii
- Odorrana anlungensis
- Odorrana chapaensis
- Odorrana chloronota
- Odorrana exiliversabilis
- Odorrana grahami
- Odorrana graminea
- Odorrana hejiangensis
- Odorrana kuangwuensis
- Odorrana lungshengensis
- Odorrana margaretae
- Odorrana mutschmanni
- Odorrana schmackeri
- Odorrana tiannanensis
- Odorrana versabilis
- Odorrana wuchuanensis
- Pelophylax fukienensis
- Pelophylax hubeiensis
- Pelophylax lateralis
- Pelophylax nigromaculatus
- Pelophylax tenggerensis
- Pelophylax terentievi
- Plateau brown frog
- Rana amurensis
- Rana chensinensis
- Rana omeimontis
- Rana sangzhiensis
- Rana weiningensis
- Rana zhengi

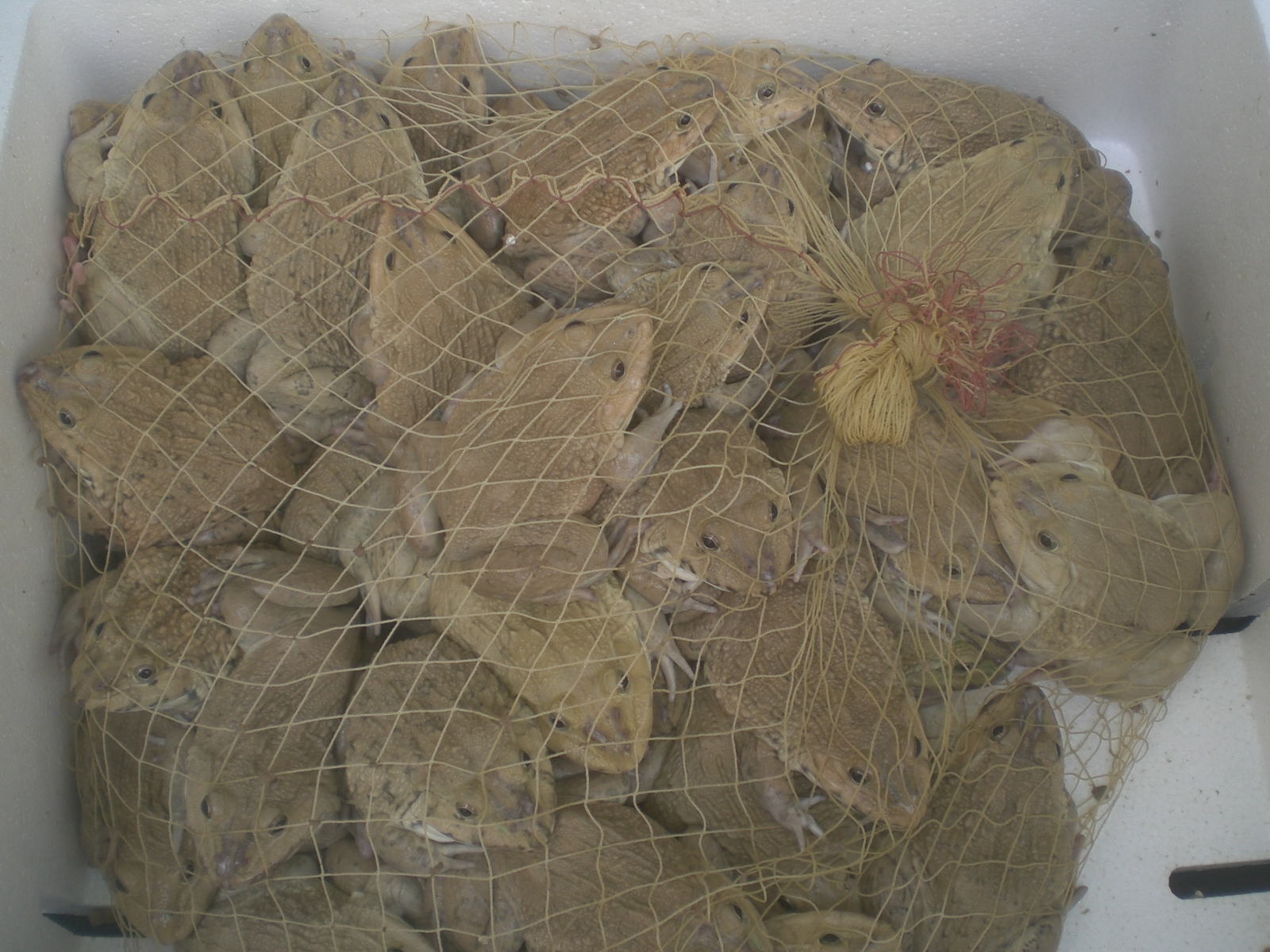
Chinese edible frogs in a net bag

==== Dicroglossidae ====
- Chinese edible frog
- Concave-eared torrent frog
- Doichang frog
- Fejervarya limnocharis
- Fejervarya moodiei
- Fejervarya multistriata
- Limnonectes longchuanensis
- Nanorana arnoldi
- Nanorana blanfordii
- Nanorana bourreti
- Nanorana conaensis
- Nanorana feae
- Nanorana liebigii
- Nanorana maculosa
- Nanorana medogensis
- Nanorana pleskei
- Nanorana polunini
- Nanorana quadranus
- Nanorana taihangnica
- Nanorana unculuanus
- Nanorana ventripunctata
- Nanorana yunnanensis
- Northern frog
- Kuhl's creek frog
- Quasipaa verrucospinosa
- Quasipaa boulengeri
- Quasipaa exilispinosa
- Quasipaa jiulongensis
- Quasipaa shini
- Quasipaa spinosa
- Quasipaa yei
- Round-tongued floating frog

==== Ceratobatrachidae ====
- Liurana

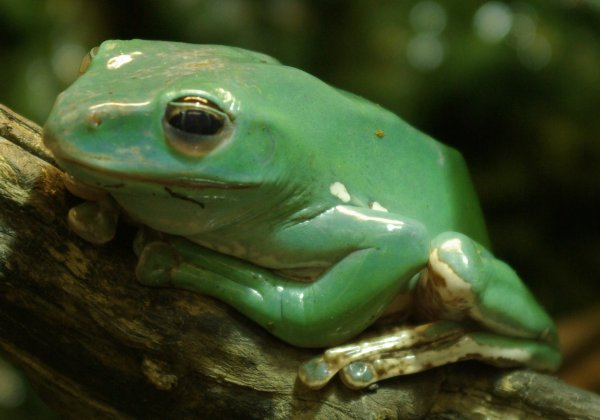

==== Tree frogs ====
- Annam tree frog
- Common Chinese tree frog
- Hyla sanchiangensis
- Hyla zhaopingensis: only in Zhaoping County, Guangxi
- Hylarana cubitalis
- Hylarana hekouensis
- Hylarana latouchii
- Hylarana macrodactyla
- Hylarana maosonensis
- Hylarana menglaensis
- Hylarana milleti
- Hylarana nigrovittata
- Hylarana spinulosa
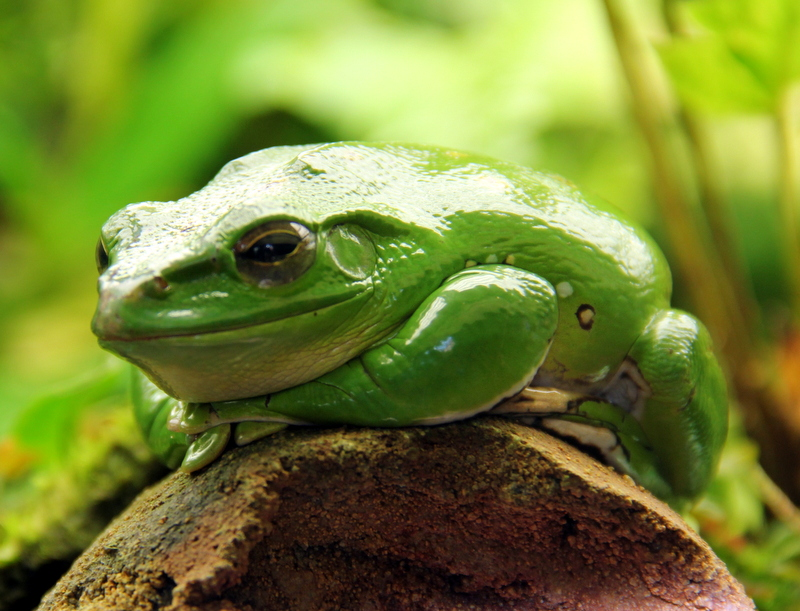
  Common Chinese tree frog
- Hylarana taipehensis
- Japanese tree frog
- Chinese flying frog
- Chiromantis vittatus
- Feihyla palpebralis
- Gracixalus gracilipes
- Gracixalus jinxiuensis
- Gracixalus medogensis
- Gracixalus nonggangensis
- Kurixalus naso
- Kurixalus odontotarsus
- Kurixalus verrucosus
- Raorchestes longchuanensis
- Raorchestes menglaensis
- Rhacophorus burmanus
- Rhacophorus chenfui
- Rhacophorus dorsoviridis
- Rhacophorus dugritei
- Rhacophorus feae
- Rhacophorus hui
- Rhacophorus hungfuensis
- Rhacophorus kio
- Rhacophorus maximus
- Rhacophorus nigropunctatus
- Rhacophorus omeimontis
- Rhacophorus puerensis
- Rhacophorus rhodopus
- Rhacophorus tuberculatus
- Rhacophorus yaoshanensis
- Romer's tree frog
- Sylvirana guentheri

==== Microhylidae ====
- Calluella yunnanensis
- Boreal digging frog
- Kalophrynus interlineatus
- Kalophrynus menglienicus
- Kaloula nonggangensis
- Kaloula rugifera
- Kaloula verrucosa
- Microhyla berdmorei
- Microhyla fissipes
- Microhyla heymonsi
- Microhyla pulchra
- Micryletta inornata
- Microhyla butleri

==== Litter frogs ====
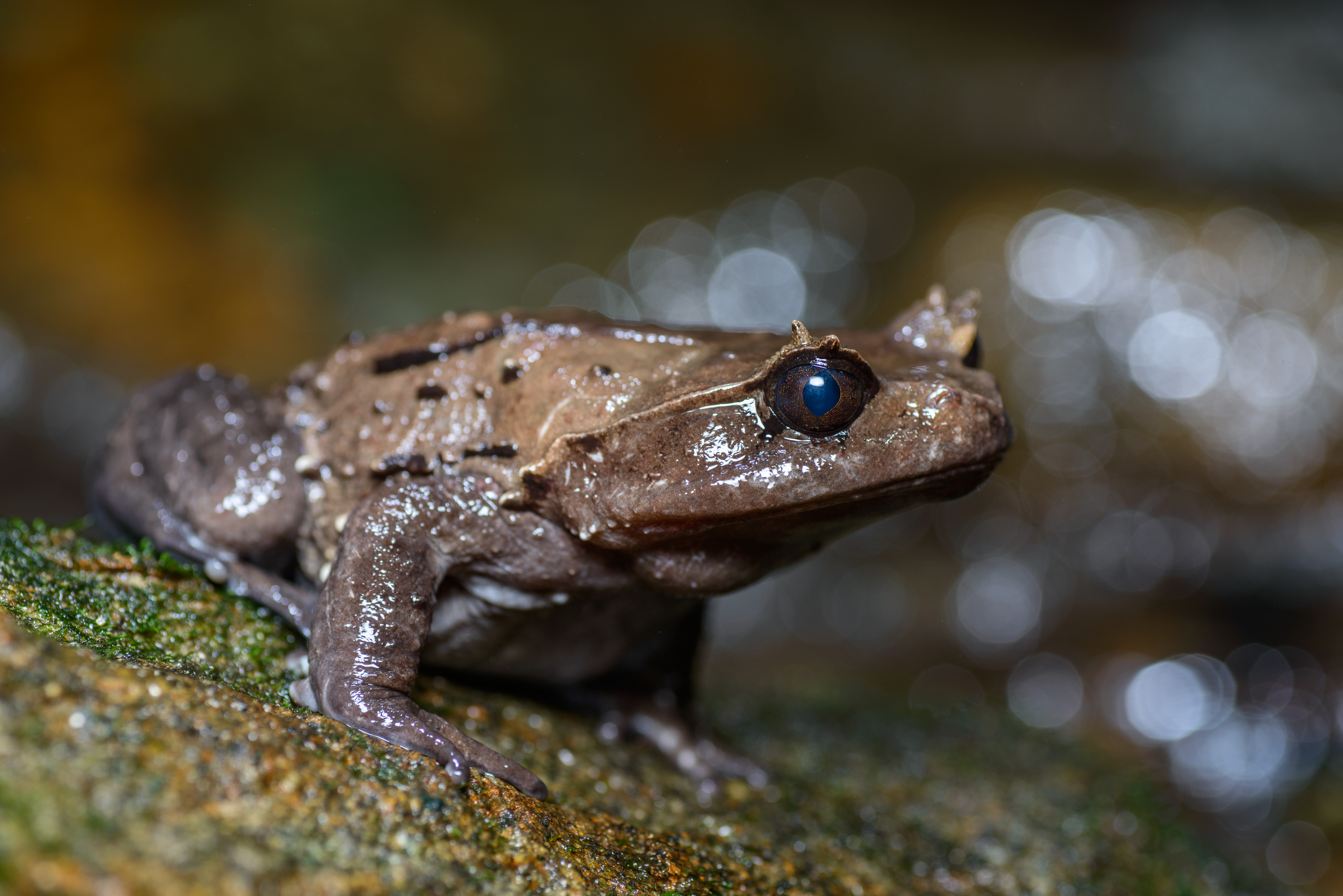
Brachytarsophrys carinense

- Brachytarsophrys carinense
- Brachytarsophrys feae
- Brachytarsophrys popei
- Buergeria oxycephala
- Leptolalax alpinus
- Leptolalax liui
- Leptolalax oshanensis
- Leptolalax sungi
- Leptolalax tengchongensis
- Leptolalax ventripunctatus
- Megophrys binchuanensis
- Megophrys brachykolos
- Megophrys cheni
- Megophrys huangshanensis
- Megophrys lini
- Megophrys major
- Megophrys parva
- Megophrys sangzhiensis
- Megophrys shuichengensis
- Megophrys wawuensis
- Oreolalax chuanbeiensis
- Oreolalax granulosus
- Oreolalax jingdongensis
- Oreolalax liangbeiensis
- Oreolalax lichuanensis
- Oreolalax major
- Oreolalax multipunctatus
- Oreolalax nanjiangensis: only in Nanjiang County, Sichuan
- Oreolalax omeimontis
- Oreolalax pingii
- Oreolalax popei
- Oreolalax puxiongensis
- Oreolalax rhodostigmatus
- Oreolalax rugosus
- Oreolalax schmidti
- Oreolalax weigoldi
- Oreolalax xiangchengensis
- Scutiger boulengeri
- Scutiger brevipes
- Scutiger chintingensis
- Scutiger glandulatus
- Scutiger gongshanensis
- Scutiger jiulongensis
- Scutiger liupanensis
- Scutiger maculatus
- Scutiger mammatus
- Scutiger muliensis: only in Muli, Sichuan
- Scutiger ningshanensis
- Scutiger nyingchiensis
- Scutiger pingwuensis
- Scutiger sikimmensis
- Scutiger tuberculatus
- Scutiger wanglangensis

==== Shrub frogs (Rhacophoridae) ====
- Liuixalus hainanus
- Liuixalus ocellatus
- Theloderma kwangsiense: only in Dayaoshan Nature Reserve (大瑶山自然保护区), Guangxi
- Philautus kempii
- Polypedates impresus
- Polypedates megacephalus
- Polypedates mutus
- Theloderma asperum
- Theloderma kwangsiense
- Theloderma moloch
- Theloderma rhododiscus
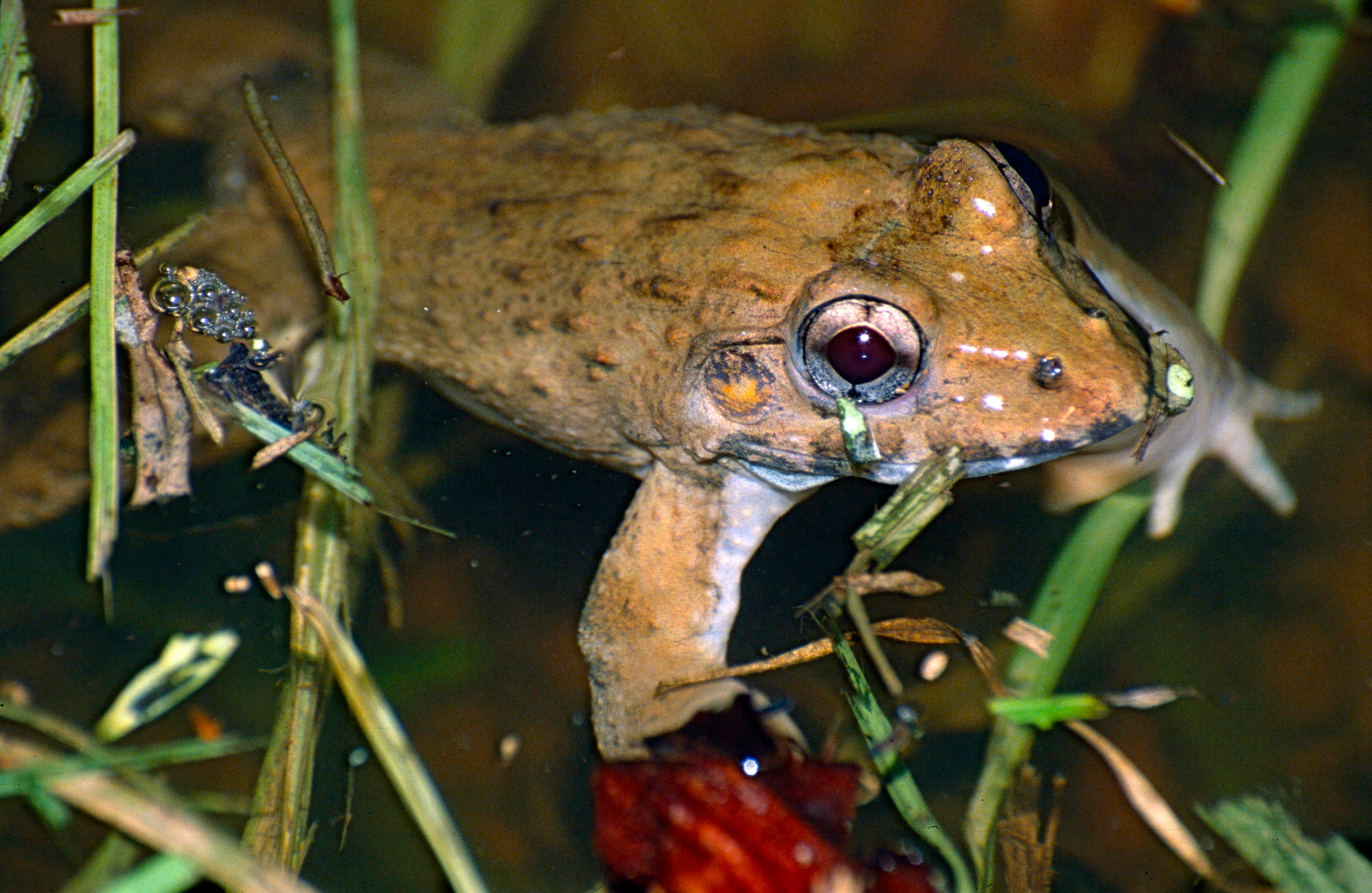

==== Salt water frogs ====
China is home to one of only 144 known modern amphibians which can tolerate brief excursions into sea water.

- Crab-eating frog

=== Toads ===
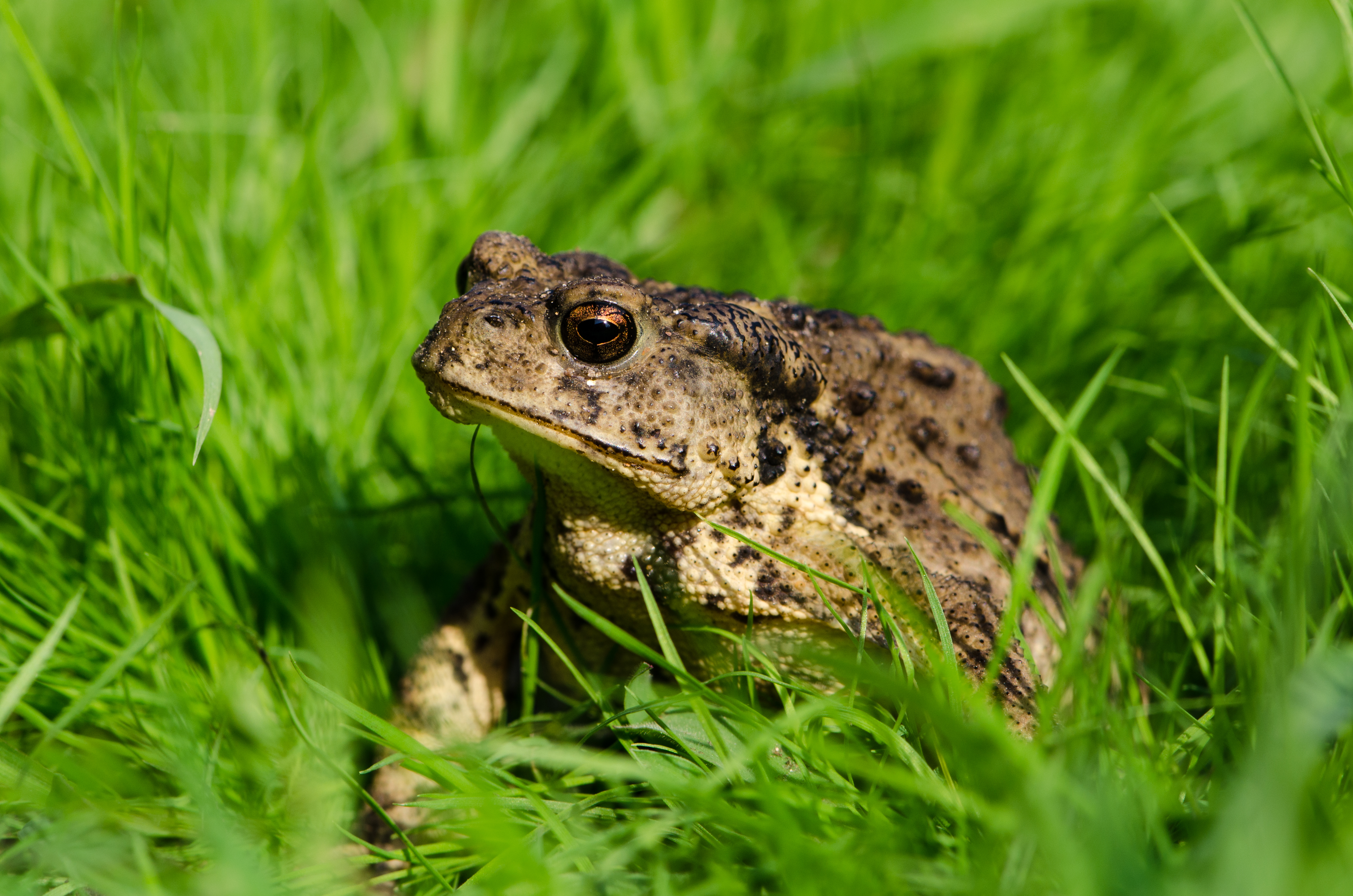
Asiatic toad in a garden in Liaoning Province, China

==== True toads (Bufo) ====
- Ailao toad
- Asiatic toad
- Bufo cryptotympanicus
- Bufo pageoti
- Bufo tuberculatus
- Bufo wolongensis: only in Wolong Nature Reserve, Sichuan
- Korean water toad
- Pseudepidalea pewzowi

==== Horned toads (Xenophrys) ====
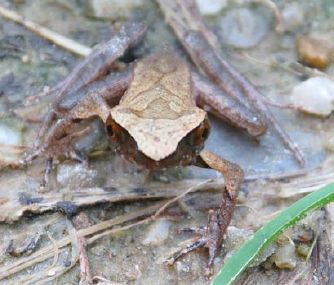
Little horned toad

- Convex-tailed horned toad
- Convex-vented horned toad
- Great piebald horned toad
- Jingdong horned toad
- Kuatun horned toad
- Mangshan horned toad
- Medog horned toad
- Mount Dawei horned toad
- Nankiang horned toad
- Boettger's horned toad
- Glandular horned toad
- Omei horned toad
- Xenophrys daweimontis: only in Daweishan Nature Reserve (大围山自然保护区), Liuyang, Hunan
- Spiny-fingered horned toad
- Wuliangshan horned toad
- Wushan horned toad
- Zhang's horned toad

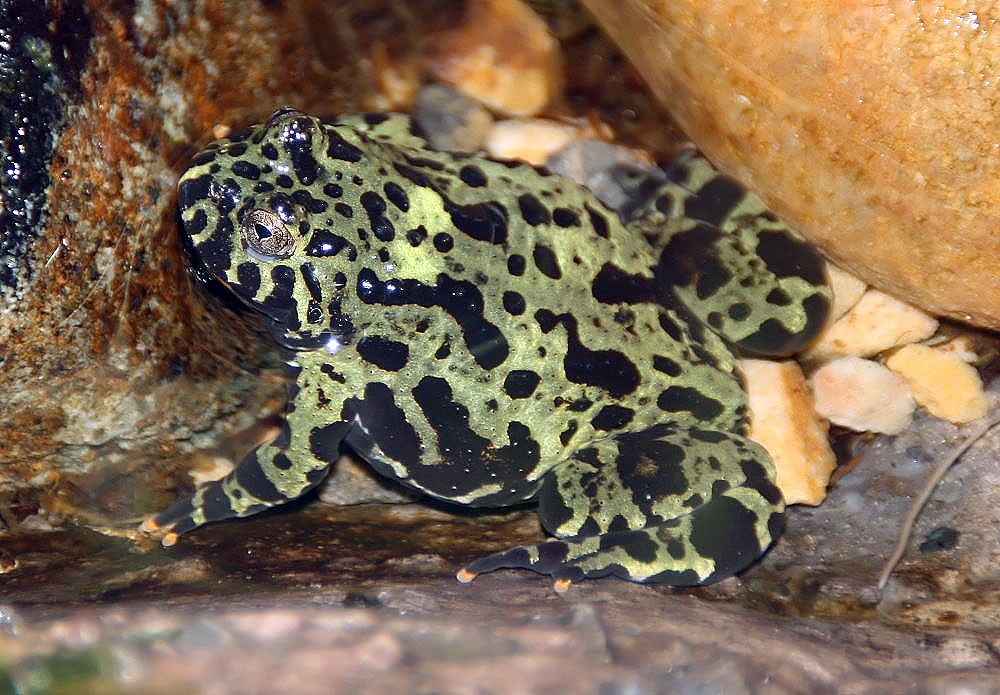
Oriental fire-bellied toad

==== Other toads ====
- Mongolian toad
- Bombina maxima
- Duttaphrynus himalayanus
- Duttaphrynus melanostictus
- Leptobrachium ailaonicum
- Leptobrachium boringii
- Leptobrachium hainanense
- Leptobrachium leishanense
- Leptobrachium liui
- Little horned toad
- Ophryophryne microstoma
- Ophryophryne pachyproctus
- Oriental fire-bellied toad
- Rough-skinned horned toad
- Shaping horned toad
- Spiny-fingered horned toad

=== Salamanders and newts ===
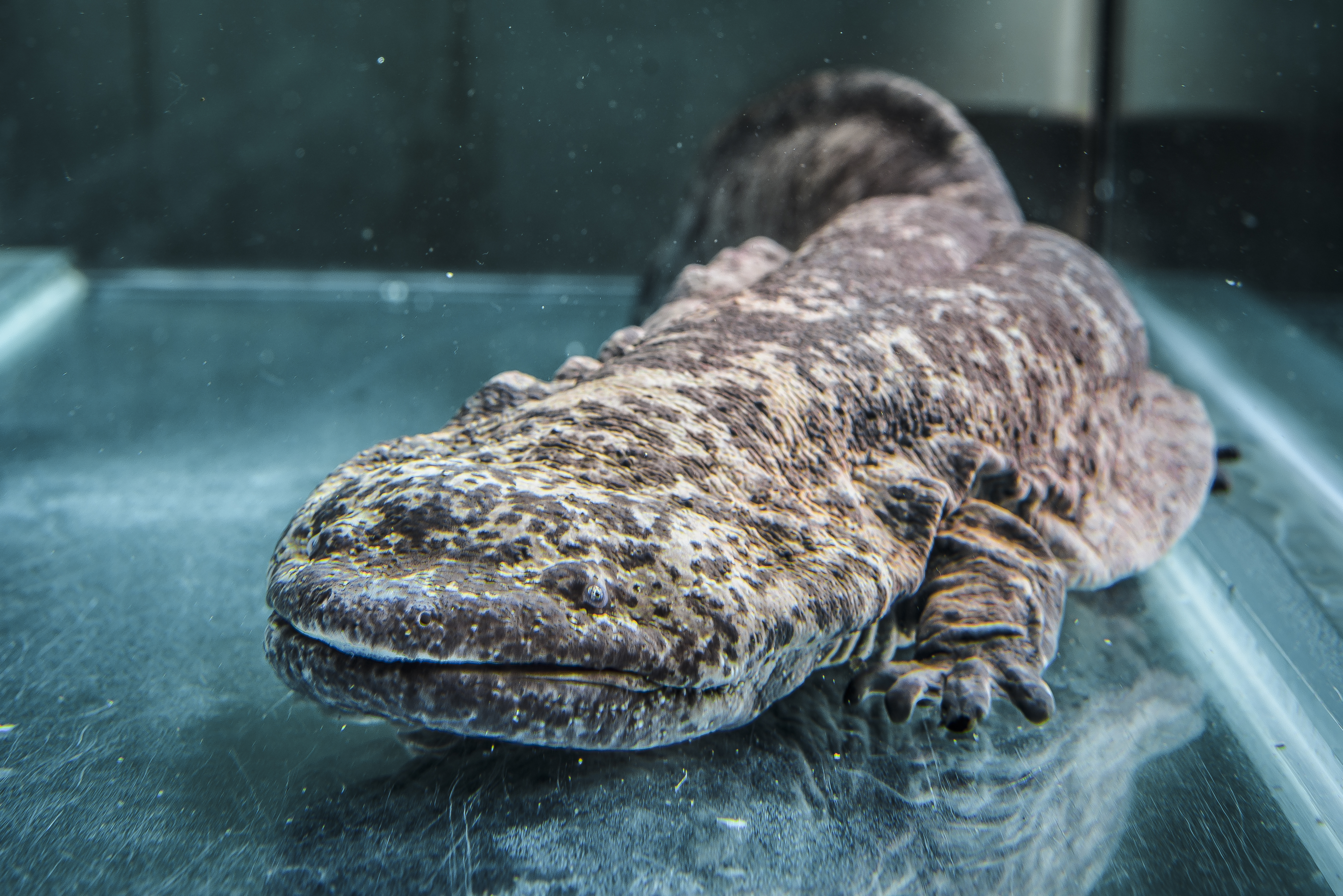
Chinese giant salamander

- Amji's salamander
- Black knobby newt
- Central Asian salamander
- Chenggong fire belly newt
- Chiala mountain salamander
- Chinese giant salamander (Andrias davidianus)
- Chinese fire belly newt
- Chinese warty newt
- Chinhai spiny newt
- Chuxiong fire-bellied newt
- Siberian salamander
- Cynops wolterstorffi: only in Kunming City, Yunnan
- Dayang newt
- Fischer's clawed salamander
- Fuding fire belly newt
- Guabang Shan salamander
- Guangxi warty newt
- Guizhou salamander
- Hainan knobby newt
- Hong Kong warty newt
- Jinfo Mountain salamander
- Korean salamander
- Kuankuoshui salamander
- Pachyhynobius shangchengensis
- Paramesotriton labiatus
- Paramesotriton maolanensis
- Paramesotriton yunwuensis
- Puxiong salamander
- Shuicheng salamander
- Siberian salamander
- Spot-tailed warty newt
- Spotted paddle-tail newt
- Taliang knobby newt
- Wanggao warty newt
- Wenxian knobby newt
- Western Chinese mountain salamander
- Xingan salamander
- Yellow-spotted salamander
- Yiwu salamander
- Yunnan lake newt
- Zhijin warty newt

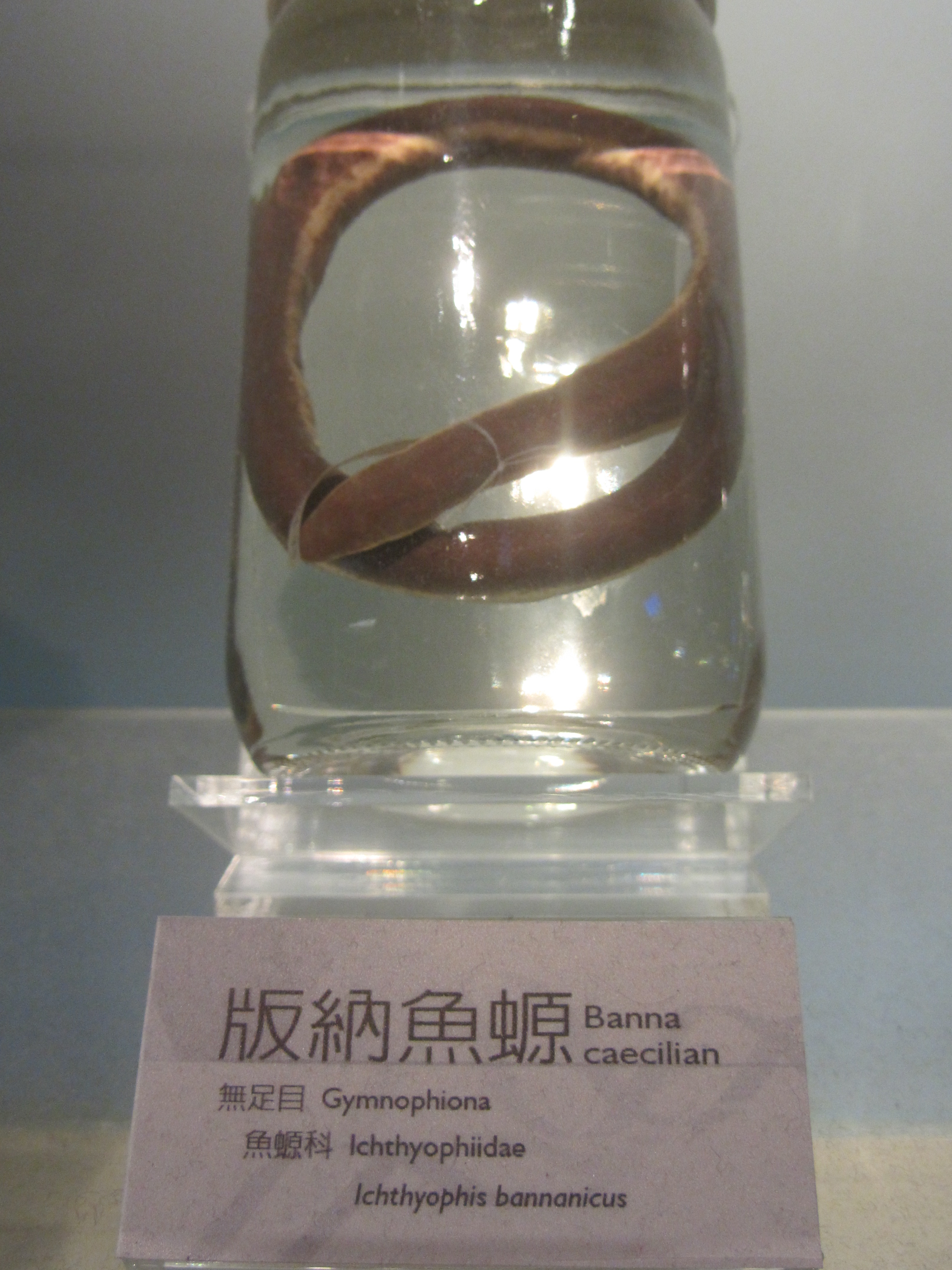
Specimen of Ichthyophis bannanicus

=== Caecilians ===
- Banna caecilian (Ichthyophis bannanicus)

== Fish ==
In freshwater alone, China has more than 1,000 fish species. By far the most diverse order are the cypriniforms, followed by the siluriforms. Yangtze is the richest river basin in the country and it is home to more than 350 strict freshwater fish species (as well as several also found in brackish or saltwater). A high percentage of these are endemic to the country and many are seriously threatened. Among others, it is feared that the Chinese paddlefish, as well as several species from the Yunnan lakes (notably Dian, Erhai, Fuxian and Yilong), already are extinct. China has far more cavefish species than any other country in the world.

With a long coastline that ranges from temperate to tropical oceans, China has many marine fish species such as the Pacific cod.

== Invertebrates ==
=== Freshwater crabs ===
China is home to more than 250 different species of freshwater crabs (families Potamidae and Gecarcinucidae), many of them endemics. It is thus the country with the highest species richness in freshwater crabs. The most speciose genera are Sinopotamon, Longpotamon, Indochinamon and Nanhaipotamon.

=== Centipedes ===
- Ethmostigmus rubripes

== Conservation ==
China's first national policy frame work for animal conservation was the September 1962 Instructions of the State Council on the Active Protection and Rational Utilization of Wild Animal Resources. The directive primarily aimed to regulate hunting to ensure that animal stocks were not exhausted, noting that wild animals were an important source of protein as well as products that "have played an important role in improving people's lives and generating foreign currency." It emphasized the idea that "wild animals are the country's natural wealth".

Dingushan Nature Reserve was the first reserve in the People's Republic of China and 19 more reserves had been designated by 1965.

Zhu Kezhen, a meteorologist and vice president of the National Academy of Sciences, was a significant figure in expanding China's view of conservation beyond utilitarian goals. Zhu contended that that animal life had significant cultural value for China.

Disruptions to scientific research during the Cultural Revolution also resulted in disrupting work on animal conservation, which had increased in the period immediately following the Great Leap Forward.

Wildlife conservation discourse in China again increased after Reform and Opening Up.

== See also ==
- List of endangered and protected species of China
- Animal welfare and rights in China
- List of mammals of China
- List of mammals of Taiwan
- List of mammals of Hong Kong
- List of amphibians of China
