= Chinese imperial cuisine =

Historic culinary traditions of China

- Traditional Chinese: 御膳 / 宮廷菜
- Simplified Chinese: 御膳 / 宫廷菜
Transcriptions
Standard Mandarin
- Hanyu Pinyin: yù shàn / gōngtíng cài

Chinese imperial cuisine is derived from a variety of cooking styles of the regions in China, mainly from the cuisines of Shandong and Jiangsu provinces. The style originated from various Emperors' Kitchen and the Empress Dowagers' Kitchen, and it is similar to Beijing cuisine which it heavily influenced.

Imperial cuisine was served mainly to the emperors, their empresses and concubines, and the imperial family. The characteristics of the Chinese imperial cuisine are the elaborate cooking methods and the strict selection of raw materials, which are often extremely expensive, rare or complicated in preparation. Visual presentation is also very important, so the colour and the shape of the dish must be carefully arranged. The most famous Chinese imperial cuisine restaurants are both located in Beijing: Fang Shan (仿膳; fǎngshàn) in Beihai Park and Ting Li Ting (聽鸝廳; tīng lí tīng) in the Summer Palace.

Styles and tastes of Chinese imperial cuisine vary from dynasty to dynasty. Every dynasty has its own distinguishing features. The two famous styles of Chinese imperial cuisine are from the Ming and Qing dynasties. Many famous dishes emerged in these dynasties, such as Wensi tofu and Peking duck.

== History ==
In the history of Chinese cuisine, Chinese imperial cuisine experienced a development process which changed from simple to exquisite. Through the changing of dynasties, Chinese imperial cuisine was continually changing, improving and self-completing. Chinese imperial food originated around the Zhou dynasty (c. 11th century – 476 BCE). Emperors used their power to collect best cuisines and best cooks from throughout the country. Therefore, from the Chinese people's perspective, imperial cuisine represented a dynasty's best cuisine.

A complete system for imperial cuisine was developed which included procurement and diets preparation. Every process of making and serving imperial cuisine was done in a fixed order according to the "eating principles". Many famous dishes were developed through creating imperial food such as the six cereals stew which included rice, millet, broomcorn, sorghum, wheat and wild rice.

Imperial cuisine was closely related to preserving health. Several hundred writings about using food and diet therapy for better health have appeared throughout Chinese history. For example, The Health Building of the People in the Song Dynasty, by Song Xu, the Gentlemen's Remark on Diets, by Chen Jiru, and the History of the Ming Palace - Preferences for Diets, by Liu Ruoyu in the Ming dynasty. Most of these books about diet therapy were written by scholars, literati, medical specialists or historians. Cooking and diet therapy to maintain good health formed an important part of Chinese imperial cuisine and Chinese dietetic culture.

Although only the imperial family was authorised to consume imperial cuisine, Chinese imperial cuisine comprised the dietetic culture of the Chinese palaces. The raw materials of imperial cuisines were provided by peasants, herders, and fisherman. The kitchen utensils were made by craftsmen. Imperial cuisine can also represent the efforts of the cooking staff who provided the service, civil officials who named the dishes, and protocol officials who drafted the dietary and culinary principles. Chinese imperial cuisine is a valuable part of Chinese traditional cuisine and cultural heritage.

== Imperial cuisine in the Ming dynasty ==
Imperial cuisine in the Ming dynasty was mostly cooked with the flavours of southern China because of the preferences of Zhu Yuanzhang, the founder of the Ming dynasty. The cuisine in the Ming palace totally changed the Mongolian style of food served during the Mongol-led Yuan dynasty. The imperial cuisine of the Ming dynasty had one important characteristic, which was to maintain good health. The emperors of the Ming dynasty paid great attention to maintaining their health by eating healthy food. The menu of imperial cuisine changed daily and dishes were not repeated. Imperial cuisine of the Ming dynasty was mainly grain-based. Therefore, meat and bean products were not as popular as they were in the former dynasties. In the Qing dynasty, a famous dish was sweet potatoes. Maize and chili peppers were also introduced in around the mid-16th century. Other famous dishes including shark's fin soup and edible bird's nest also gained their fame during this period. Those two dishes were introduced to China by the explorer Zheng He in the early Ming dynasty. While these two dishes were becoming examples of extravagant dishes, sea cucumbers and prawns were also brought into China. Many famous cooks and chefs such as Song Wusao and Wang Eryu emerged in the Ming dynasty.

=== Popular dishes ===
==== Peking duck (北京烤鸭) ====
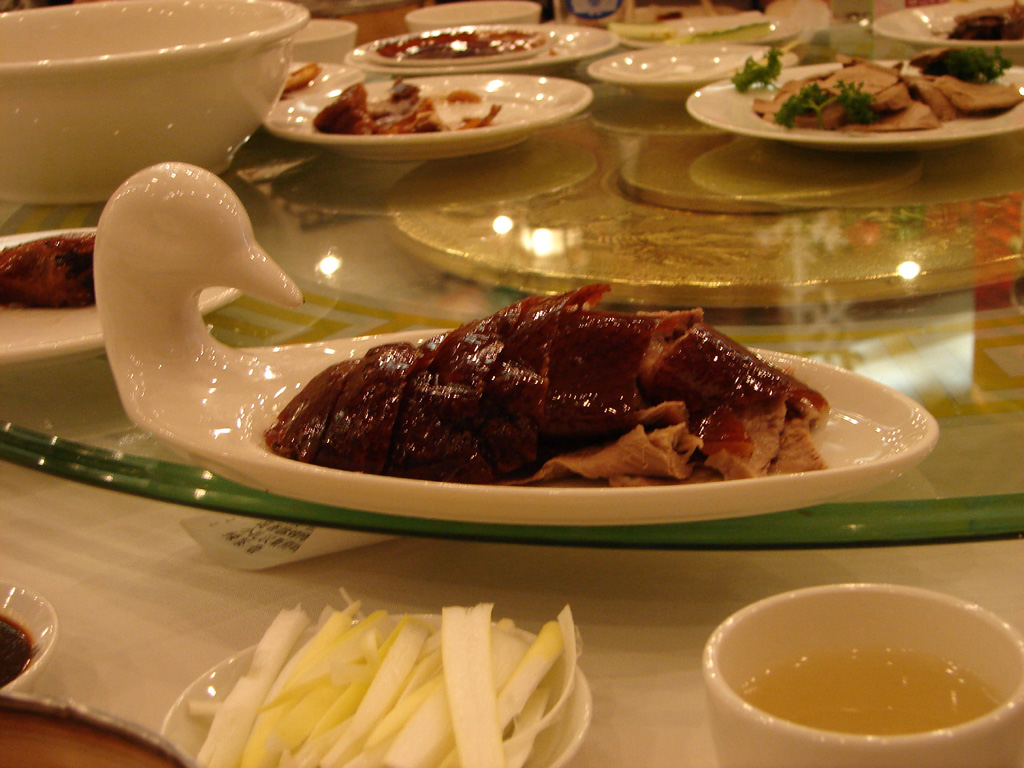
Peking duck

Peking duck originated in the Southern and Northern Dynasties (420–589 CE), specifically originated in Nanjing. Roasted duck was first served as a dish in imperial cuisine during the Yuan dynasty. It developed fully and became an important part of imperial cuisine menus during the Ming dynasty. In contemporary society, Peking roasted duck has entered international cuisine. Peking roasted duck was famous because of its crispy skin and the juicy meat which left a deep impression on people eating it for the first time. Since the imperial era, the dish is admired for its thin, crispy skin sliced in front of the diners by the cook. There are unique techniques to serving and eating Peking duck for maximum enjoyment of its taste.

== Imperial cuisine in the Qing dynasty ==
Chinese imperial cuisine in the Qing dynasty was developed basing on the traditional diet of the Manchu ethnic group and Shandong cuisine. The famous Manchu Han Imperial Feast was created during this dynasty. There was a special organisation, the Imperial Kitchen, within the Qing imperial palace which was responsible for creating and making imperial cuisine for the emperor. The Imperial Kitchen was managed by the General Office of Internal Affairs. During the reign of the Qianlong Emperor (r. 1735–1796), the Imperial Kitchen was divided into the Internal Kitchen and the External Kitchen. The Internal Kitchen had departments for meat dishes, vegetables, roasting, baking and rice cooking. The External Kitchen prepared the palace banquets, feasts and sacrificial rites. During the Qing dynasty, the rites for the meals, the number of people, and the use, cost, variety and quality of sumptuous courses at each meal were the greatest of all the dynasties in China.

=== Popular dishes ===
==== Dezhou braised chicken ====
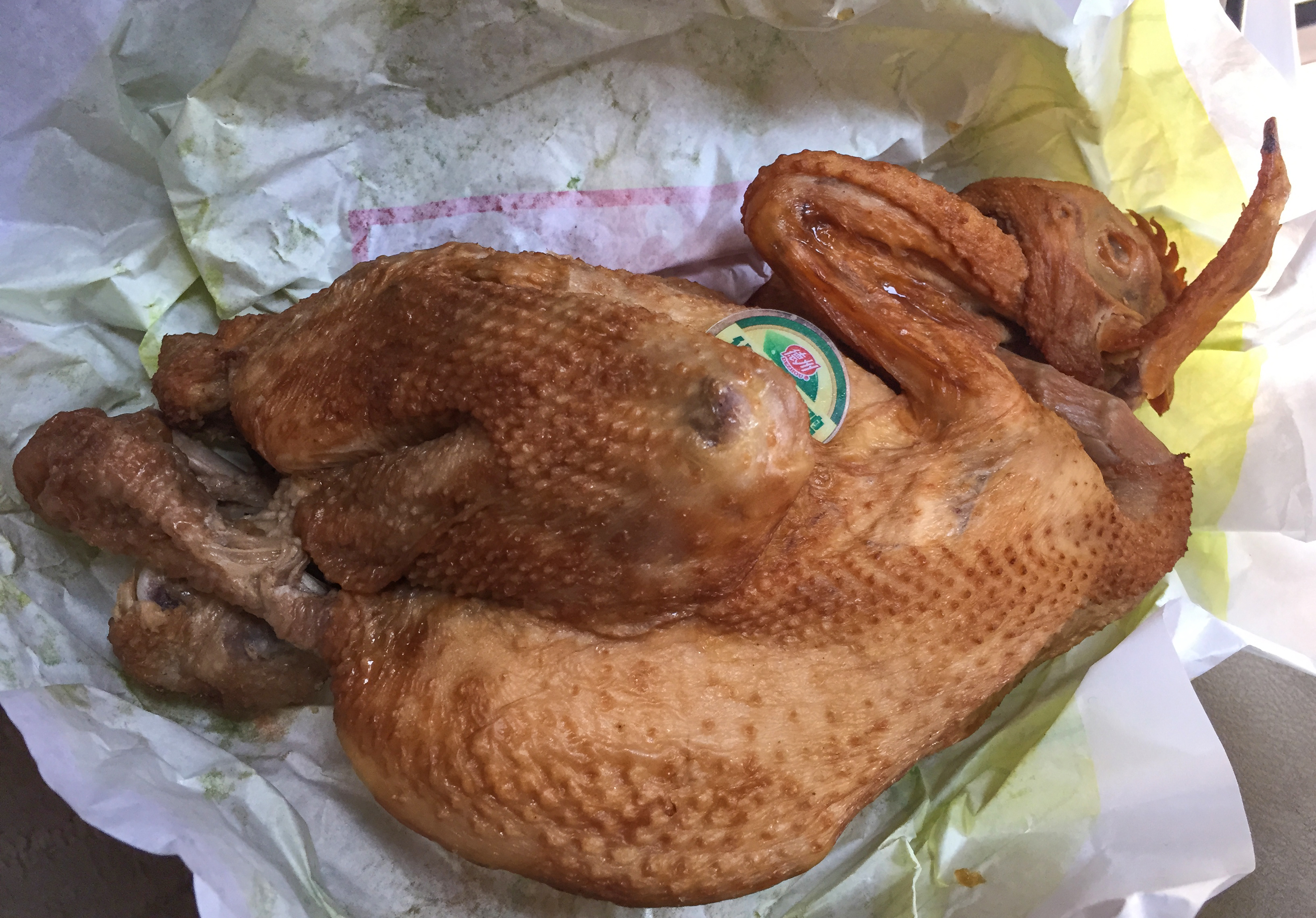
Dezhou braised chicken

Dezhou braised chicken is a traditional dish from Dezhou City, Shandong Province and it is named after its place of origin. When the Qianlong Emperor travelled to Dezhou City, a Han Chinese family made braised chicken for him. The emperor thought highly of this dish and praised it as "a wonder of all cuisine". After eating Dezhou braised chicken, the Qianlong Emperor ordered that this dish be included in the menu of imperial cuisine. Dezhou braised chicken features red glossy skin, tender texture, aromatic smell, and a juicy taste.

==== Wensi tofu ====
Wensi tofu is a meal in Jiangsu cuisine. It is a soup made of finely shredded tofu and different ingredients of different colours, such as carrots and cucumbers. This dish represents the typical work of knife skill of a chef from Yangzhou because a chef needs to cut a square of tofu into more than 5,000 pieces in order to make this soup.

During the reign of the Qianlong Emperor, there was a monk by the name of Wensi, who was famous for making vegetarian dishes, particularly those with tofu. He created this soup which ingredients included tender tofu, dried daylily, and black fungus. This soup soon became well known throughout the region as "Wensi Tofu". The Qianlong Emperor tried this soup and highly appreciated it. Wensi tofu then added by the emperor to the menu of imperial cuisine.

== Styles ==
There are currently (as of 2017) eight styles of Chinese imperial cuisines of different Chinese dynasties have been restored:

- Chinese imperial cuisine of the Qin and Han dynasties (秦漢菜): Restored by Qujiangchun (曲江春) Restaurant in Xi'an based on records in ancient Chinese texts, including more than a dozen dishes.
- Chinese imperial cuisine of the Tang dynasty (唐朝宮廷菜/仿唐宴): Based on Wei Juyuan’s Shao-Wei Banquet Menu (燒尾宴食單), restaurants in Xi’an such as Tang Music Hall (唐樂宫) restored many dishes of Chinese imperial cuisine of the Tang dynasty.
- Chinese imperial cuisine of the Northern Song dynasty (北宋宮廷菜/仿北宋宴): Chinese imperial cuisine of the Northern Song dynasty restored by restaurants in Kaifeng such as You-Yi-Xin (又一新) and Sun-Yang-Zheng-Dian (孫羊正店).
- Chinese imperial cuisine of the Southern Song dynasty (南宋宮廷菜/仿南宋宴): Chinese imperial cuisine of the Southern Song dynasty restored by restaurants in Hangzhou such as Southern Grand Hotel of Hangzhou (杭州南方大酒家) and Hangzhou Bagua Building (杭州八卦大樓).
- Chinese imperial cuisine of Dunhuang (敦煌宮廷菜/敦煌宴): Chinese imperial cuisine of Dunhuang restored by restaurants in Dunhuang such as Dunhuang Hotel (乾隆禦宴) and Dunhuang Villa (敦煌山莊).
- Qianlong era imperial cuisine (of the mid Qing dynasty) (乾隆御宴): Chinese imperial cuisine of the mid Qing dynasty restored by restaurants in Yangzhou such as Yangzhou Western Garden Grand Hotel (揚州西苑大酒店), with dished prepared according to menus of imperial banquets held by the Qianlong Emperor during his trips to southern China.
- Chinese imperial cuisine of the late Qing dynasty (晚清宮廷菜): Chinese imperial cuisine of late Qing dynasty prepared for Empress Dowager Cixi. Restaurants in Beijing such as Fangshan Restaurant (仿膳飯莊) and Ting Li Ting (聽鷂廳) restaurant, and restaurants in Shenyang such as Shenyang Imperial Cuisine Restaurant (瀋陽禦膳酒樓) restored this Chinese imperial cuisine based on menus of the imperial kitchens of the Forbidden City and Summer Palace, as well other records.
- Chinese imperial cuisine of Chengde (塞外宫廷菜): Chinese imperial cuisine of the Qing dynasty prepared at Chengde Mountain Resort during the emperors' annual summer trips to Chengde. This Chinese imperial cuisine differs from other styles of Chinese imperial cuisines in that the main ingredients is mostly beef, mutton and lamb, along with meat from game.

== See also ==
- Shandong cuisine
- Jiangsu cuisine
- Beijing cuisine
- Peking Duck
- Dezhou braised chicken
- Shark's fin soup
- Edible bird's nest
