= Carne de chango =

Mexican pork dish

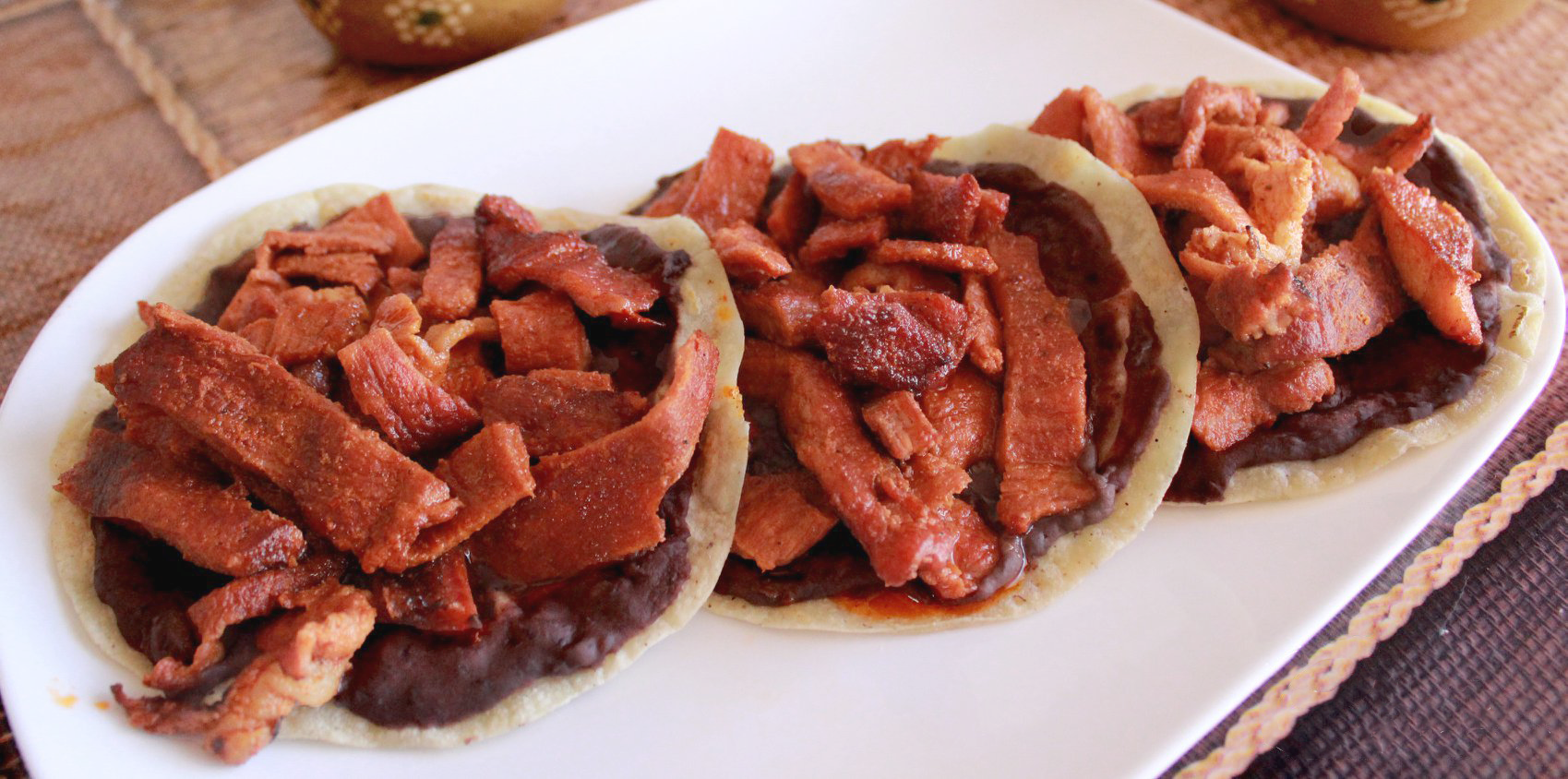
- Carne de chango pellizcadas at a restaurant in Catemaco.
- Type: Smoked meat
- Course: Main
- Place of origin: Mexico
- Region or state: Veracruz
- Main ingredients: Pork
- Ingredients generally used: Lemon juice, orange juice, garlic, achiote, salt, Black pepper

Carne de chango (Spanish for "monkey meat") is a lime-marinated, smoke-cured cut of pork loin principally seen in the Catemaco region of the state of Veracruz in Mexico.

The switch from monkey meat to pork meat arose from the hunting to the edge of extinction of the two monkey species resident in the Sierra de Los Tuxtlas.

Generally, pork loin is marinated for several hours in orange or lemon juice, salt, pepper, and sometimes garlic and achiote. While the meat is marinating, a fire is prepared to smoke the meat. Young wood from guava trees or orange trees is used. Pieces of sugarcane or piloncillo are added to the firewood to increase smoke, and is burned for several hours until the meat is cooked. In other recipes, it can be cold smoked or salted.

The marination and smoking give the meat a reddish color, and a unique taste of Catemacan cuisine, similar to the original Carne de chango. Originally, this dish was made with monkey meat, which is currently prohibited due to the threat of extinction. It is not uncommon to encounter dishes made with animals such as armadillo, iguana, wild boar, Mexican badger, lowland paca, opossum, or skunks in Veracruzian cuisine, especially in rural areas.

== Use of simian meat ==
In the past, this dish was made with real monkey meat. However, the consumption of monkey meat is currently prohibited due to the fact that monkey populations had been reduced to near extinction, which was primarily caused due to large scale deforestation, as well as sale of monkeys as pets. To raise awareness about this problem, a festival called Changos, y Monos, Tesoros de los Tuxtlas has been celebrated every October since 2013 in Catemaco.

Of the three species of primates that exist in Mexico, the Yucatán Black Howler (Alouatta pigra), the Mantled Howler (Alouatta palliata), and the Central American spider monkey (Ateles geoffroyi), there is no study that informs with clarity how much of the populations remain or have disappeared in the last few decades. Likewise, there is no plan to recover the population of primates, nor are there measures in place to effectively carry out the prohibition of consumption of monkey meat; most restaurants have indeed banned the practice, but is still consumed in private banquets which still may serve Carne de chango with real monkey meat.

Later on, in 1974, a macaque species (Macaca arctoides) arrived from Thailand, which was of course a non native and potentially invasive species in one of the islands of Laguna de Catemaco, known as Isla de los Monos ("Isle of the Monkeys"). It was introduced as a means to experiment on for pharmaceutical and laboratiry use. These monkeys, being different generations completely from other populations of the same species, tended to be born with birth defects. This environmental disaster was fixed in 2011, when Thai monkeys were substituted with 16 native spider monkeys.
