= Manchu–Han Imperial Feast =

Chinese grand banquet style of cooking

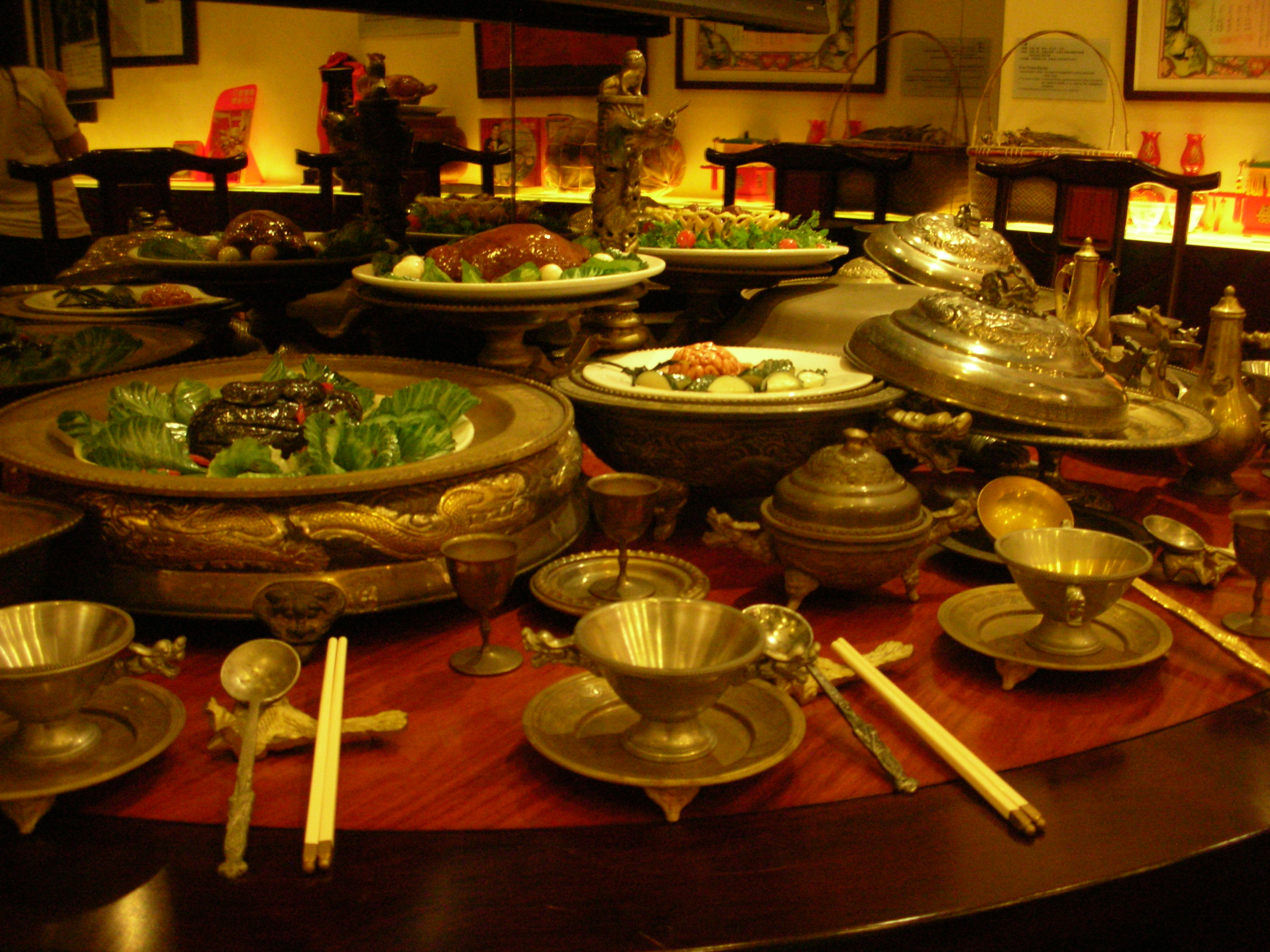
- Manchu-Han Imperial Feast displayed at Tao Heung Museum of Food Culture

Chinese name
- Traditional Chinese: 滿漢全席
- Simplified Chinese: 满汉全席
Transcriptions
Standard Mandarin
- Hanyu Pinyin: Mǎnhàn quánxí
- Bopomofo: ㄇㄢˇ ㄏㄢˋ ㄑㄩㄢˊ ㄒㄧˊ
- Wade–Giles: Man³han⁴ ch'üan²hsi²
Wu
- Romanization: Moe^{上}hoe^{去} zie^{平}zih^{入}
Hakka
- Romanization: Man²⁴hon⁵⁵ qion¹¹qiag⁵
Yue: Cantonese
- Jyutping: Mun⁵hon³ cyun zik⁶
Southern Min
- Hokkien POJ: Buánhàn tsuânsi̍k

Vietnamese name
- Vietnamese alphabet: Mãn Hán toàn tịch

Korean name
- Hangul: 만한전석
- Hanja: 滿漢全席
Transcriptions
- Revised Romanization: Manhan jeonseok
- McCune–Reischauer: Manhan chŏnsŏk

Japanese name
- Kanji: 満漢全席
- Kana: まんかんぜんせき
Transcriptions
- Romanization: Mankan zenseki

The term Manchu–Han Imperial Feast (simplified Chinese: 满汉全席; traditional Chinese: 滿漢全席; pinyin: Mǎnhàn quánxí, and also Comprehensive Manchu–Han Banquet) refers to a style of cooking and a type of grand banquet that combines elements of Manchu and Han Chinese cuisine developed in the Qing dynasty of China (1644–1912). The origins are disputed, but by the nineteenth century, the style became popular and was emulated in twentieth and twenty-first-century restaurants.

== History ==
=== Qing dynasty ===
When the Qing dynasty took control of China in the seventeenth century, they replaced the Ming dynasty chefs in the palace, who were mostly from Shandong, with their own Manchu cooks. Manchu food was the main food served in the palace until the Qianlong emperor invited notable chefs from the south to join the palace kitchen. The new style of cooking included Shandong, southern, and Manchu elements, and resulted in what was called a "Manchu-Han banquet" (Man Han quanxi). This style of the banquet was not featured at palace banquets, but soon became fashionable and by the nineteenth had spread to cities such as Canton and Tianjin.

Another legend is that the Kangxi Emperor wanted to resolve disputes between Manchu and Han peoples, so he held a banquet during his 66th birthday celebration (with 66 being a special number in Chinese culture, see Chinese numerology). The banquet consisted of Manchu and Han dishes, with officials from both ethnic groups attending the banquet together.

There is also another theory that this kind of feast never existed in the history, but was a xiangsheng sketch comedy instead, which included a long list of various dishes.

=== Preparation ===
The meal comprised six banquets over three days with over 300 dishes. Altogether there are said to have been 196 main dishes and 124 snack dishes, for a total of 320 dishes sampled over three days. Depending on how the dishes are counted with the samples, at the absolute minimum there were 108 dishes. The feast was divided into inner-palace and outer-palace banquets; only the imperial family and meritorious officials, including Han officials above the second rank, were invited into the inner-palace banquets. A book from the reign of the Qianlong Emperor (1735–1796) gives a detailed description of the feast and the dishes and ingredients.

=== The meal ===
It is said that there were "Thirty-Two Delicacies," referring to exotic ingredients used for the banquet. The "Eight Mountain Delicacies" includes such dishes as camel's hump, bear's paws, monkey's brains, ape's lips, leopard fetuses, rhinoceros tails, and deer tendons. The "Eight Land Delicacies" includes several precious fowls and mushrooms, and the "Eight Sea Delicacies" includes dried sea cucumbers, shark's fin, bird's nest soup and others.

Some of the dishes:

- Snowy Palm: bear claw with sturgeon
- Golden Eyes and Burning Brain: bean curd simmered in chicken, duck and cuckoo brains
- Monkey King and Shark: goat brain
- Monkey brain
- Egg tart
- Wensi Tofu
- Dezhou braised chicken
- Peking duck
- Shark fin soup
- Edible bird's nest
- Dried sea cucumbers
- Ye wei

=== Utensils ===
The utensils, like the food, were lavish; the majority of utensils were finely crafted bronzeware and porcelainware in the shape of many animals which was designed with mechanisms for keeping the dishes warm throughout the meal. In general the Manchu dishes were first sampled, followed by the Han dishes.

== In popular culture ==
The imperial meal was re-enacted in the movie The Chinese Feast, which featured a banquet of 108 dishes served in six meals over the course of three days. The dishes themselves involved exotic ingredients and a variety of cooking techniques from every part of Imperial China. The television drama Happy Ever After and Gilded Chopsticks, in the anime Cooking Master Boy and the television series My Fair Princess, as well as in chapters 106 and 142 of the manga Medaka Box.

It was also mentioned by the character Mion Sonozaki in the visual novel Higurashi When They Cry during Episode 3 Tatarigoroshi-hen for the Bento Box competition.

In modern times, the Chinese term "Manhan Quanxi" can be used as an idiomatic expression to represent any feast of significant proportions. As an example, various media outlets may refer to a dinner gala as "Manhan Quanxi", while in China there are also numerous cooking competitions which make use of the aforementioned name, while not specifically referring to the original meaning of the imperial feast. The name is also used extensively in product names in the food industry, such usage evident as brands of sauces and instant noodles by various companies.

An abridged version of the Cantonese version of the imperial meal was depicted in Mister Ajikko, where the Almond Tofu dessert is used as a contest against the expert in the dish, a corrupt monk in the Cuisine Temple.

An inspiration of the imperial meal was re-enacted in Kung Fu Panda Holiday.

A fictional Japanese version of the imperial meal was depicted in The Last Recipe.

In the anime Kore wa Zombi Desu ka? (English: Is This a Zombie?) the mute character Eucliwood Hellscythe, who communicates by writing messages, demands that the main character make her dinner; then follows up this demand by demanding a "Manchu Imperial Feast."

== Replicas ==
There have been attempts since 1720 to replicate the original Manhan Quanxi and in the late 1980s, a certain replica meal was estimated to cost over one million Japanese yen. Many of the animals used in the meal are endangered species today.

== See also ==
- List of dining events
