= Monkey brains =

Supposed culinary dish

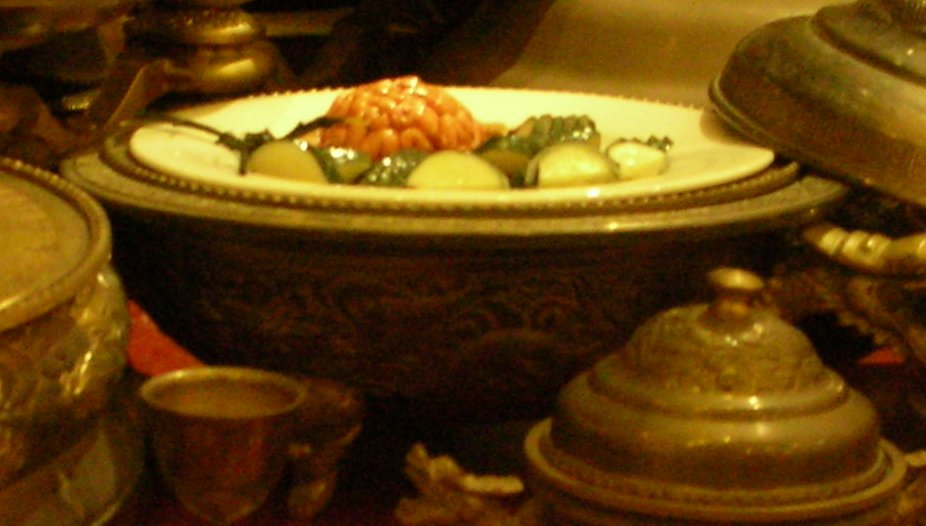
Simulated monkey brains displayed at the Tao Heung Museum of Food Culture in Hong Kong, depicted as part of the Manchu Han Imperial Feast

Monkey brains is a supposed dish consisting of, at least, partially, the brain of some species of monkey or ape.

While animal brains have been consumed in various cuisines (e.g. eggs and brains or fried brain sandwiches), there is debate about whether monkey brains have actually been consumed. In Western popular culture its consumption is repeatedly portrayed and debated, often in the context of portraying exotic cultures as exceptionally cruel, callous, or strange.

== Consumption ==
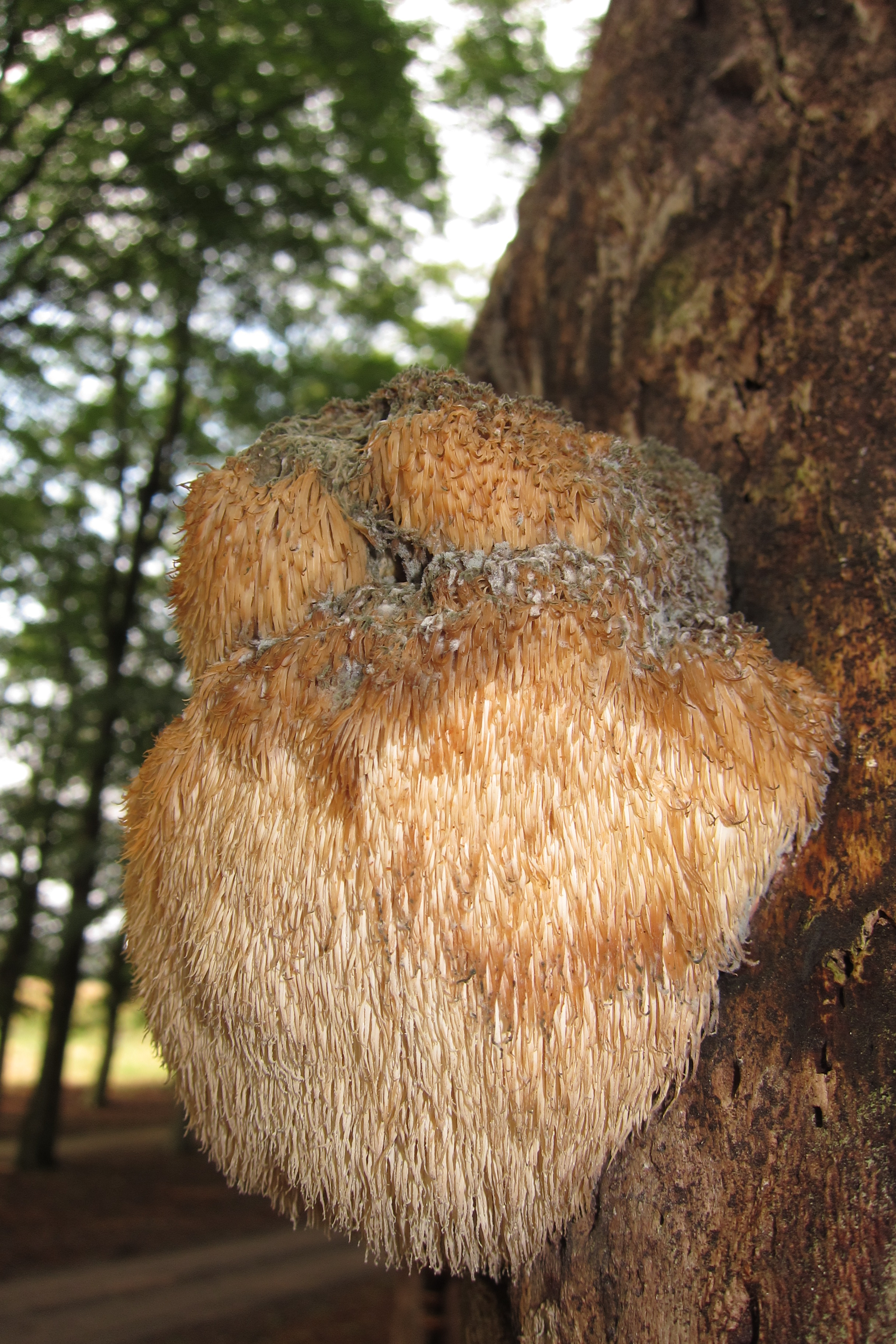
The edible fungus species Hericium erinaceus, known as the monkey head mushroom, bears superficial resemblance to the fur of certain Asian primates such as macaques.

Initial confusion over a translated term for the edible monkey-head mushroom (Hericium erinaceus) may have played a part in the belief that monkey brains were used in Asian cuisine. Known as hóu tóu gū in Chinese (simplified: 猴头菇; traditional: 猴頭菇; lit. "monkey head mushroom"), the mushroom received its moniker owing to the superficial resemblance it bears to the fur of certain primates found in Asia, such as macaques.

Actual monkey brains were historically part of the Manchu Han Imperial banquet of the Qing Empire held during the 17th century, where they may have been eaten directly from the skull.

One modern account published in 1958 from travel writer Leila Hadley details a meal in a restaurant in Macao near Hong Kong where monkey brains were eaten from a freshly killed monkey's skull. The writer Albert Podell claims to have eaten live monkey brains in Hong Kong in 1966, which he describes in his book Around The World in 50 Years. There is doubt about whether such practices take place today. Official Chinese policy on the procurement of certain wildlife species in the 21st century makes the serving of monkey brains illegal, with sentences of up to 10 years in prison for violators.

Beyond Asia and into Africa, naturalist Angela Meder has described in Gorilla Journal a cultural practice of the Anaang people of southeastern Nigeria and southwestern Cameroon whereby a new tribal chief would consume the brain of a hunted gorilla while another senior member of the tribe consumed the heart. According to this account, the practice occurred only in the specific instance of a new chiefdom, as the killing of gorillas would otherwise be forbidden.

=== Health risks ===
Consuming the brain and other nervous system tissues of some animals is considered hazardous to human health, possibly resulting in transmissible encephalopathies such as Creutzfeldt–Jakob disease.

== In fiction ==
A fictional depiction of the consumption of monkey brains is shown in the 1978 mondo film Faces of Death, directed by John Alan Schwartz. The scene depicts an Eastern-themed restaurant with patrons seated around a table watching a belly dance. A narrator explains that these are tourists who have come to this location to consume "the house specialty." The proprietor signals for a server to bring out a monkey, which is then secured inside a pen built into the table. The tourists are given hammers, and they proceed to hit the monkey on the head until it is killed. The server then cuts open the skull and removes the monkey's brains onto a plate for the patrons to sample. In actuality no monkey was harmed in the making of the scene, as the hammers were made of foam and the 'monkey's head' was a prop filled with gelatin, red food coloring, and cauliflower to simulate brain matter.

In the 1994 Hong Kong Film The Chinese Feast, A 3-day competition based on the Manchu–Han Imperial Feast took place, with Monkey Brain serving as the last themed ingredient of the competition. Knowing the illegal status of Monkey Brain, the antagonist utilized Sheep Brain as substitute before contacting authorities upon the protagonist. Anticipating the trickery, the protagonist themselves revealed they themselves mimicked monkey brain with tofu and infused with flavor from various meat.

Additional depictions in the decade following the release of Faces of Death contain scenes which reference the practice of eating monkey brains, including one from the 1984 film Indiana Jones and the Temple of Doom, the 1981 Japanese crime film Sailor Suit and Machine Gun, as well as dialogue from the 1985 comedy Clue. In addition to their shock value, what these scenes have in common are their representations of Orientalism, which according to author Sophia Rose Arjana, work as cinematic tropes used to "conflate bizarre and vulgarized representations of the Far East".

== See also ==
- Monkey meat
