= Shandong cuisine =

Branch of Chinese traditional cuisine native to Shandong province

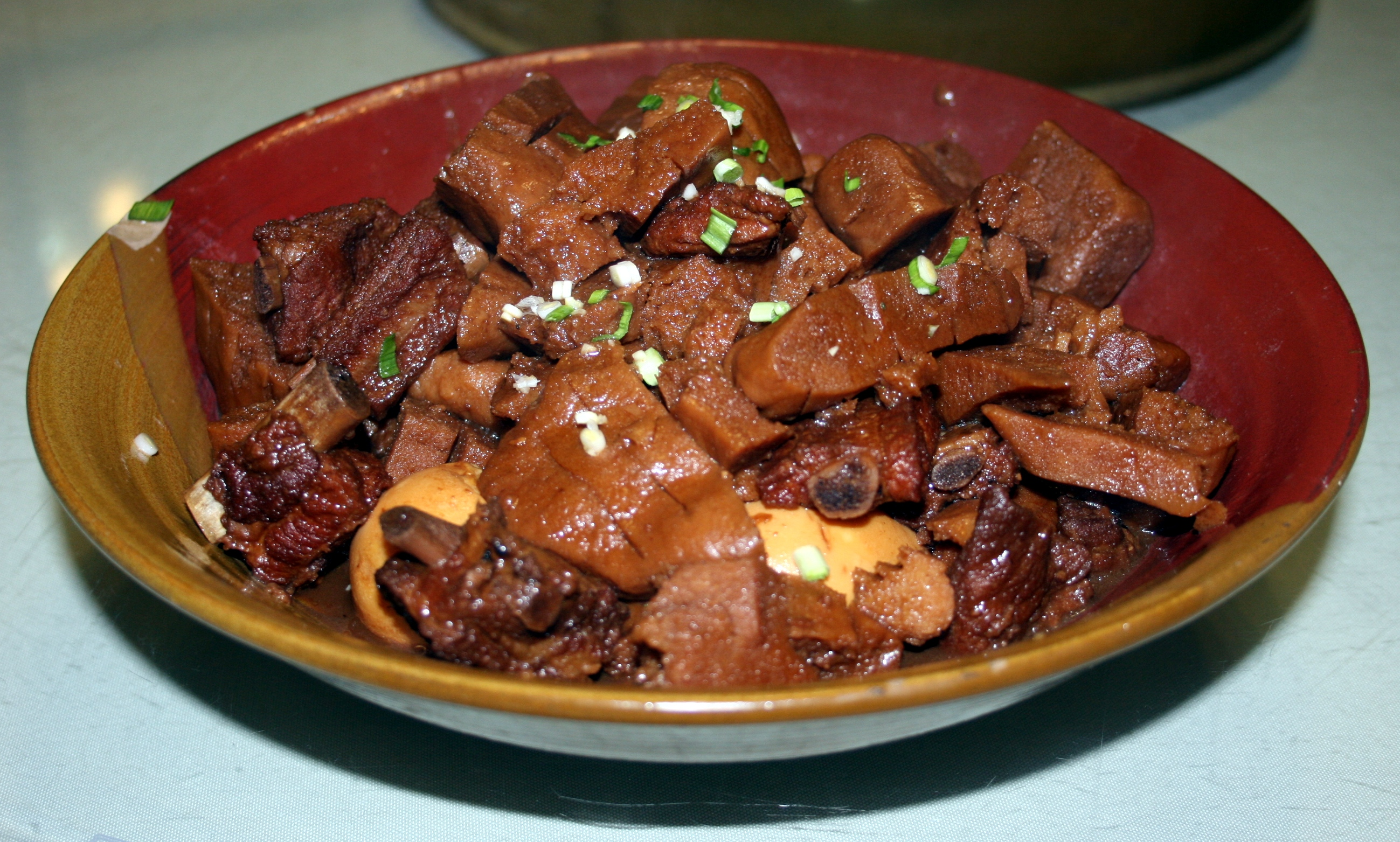
- Braised spare ribs with gluten (面筋红烧排骨; 麵筋紅燒排骨; miànjīn hóngshāo páigǔ)
- Traditional Chinese: 山東菜
- Simplified Chinese: 山东菜
Transcriptions
Standard Mandarin
- Hanyu Pinyin: Shāndōng cài

Lu cuisine
- Traditional Chinese: 魯菜
- Simplified Chinese: 鲁菜
Transcriptions
Standard Mandarin
- Hanyu Pinyin: Lǔ cài

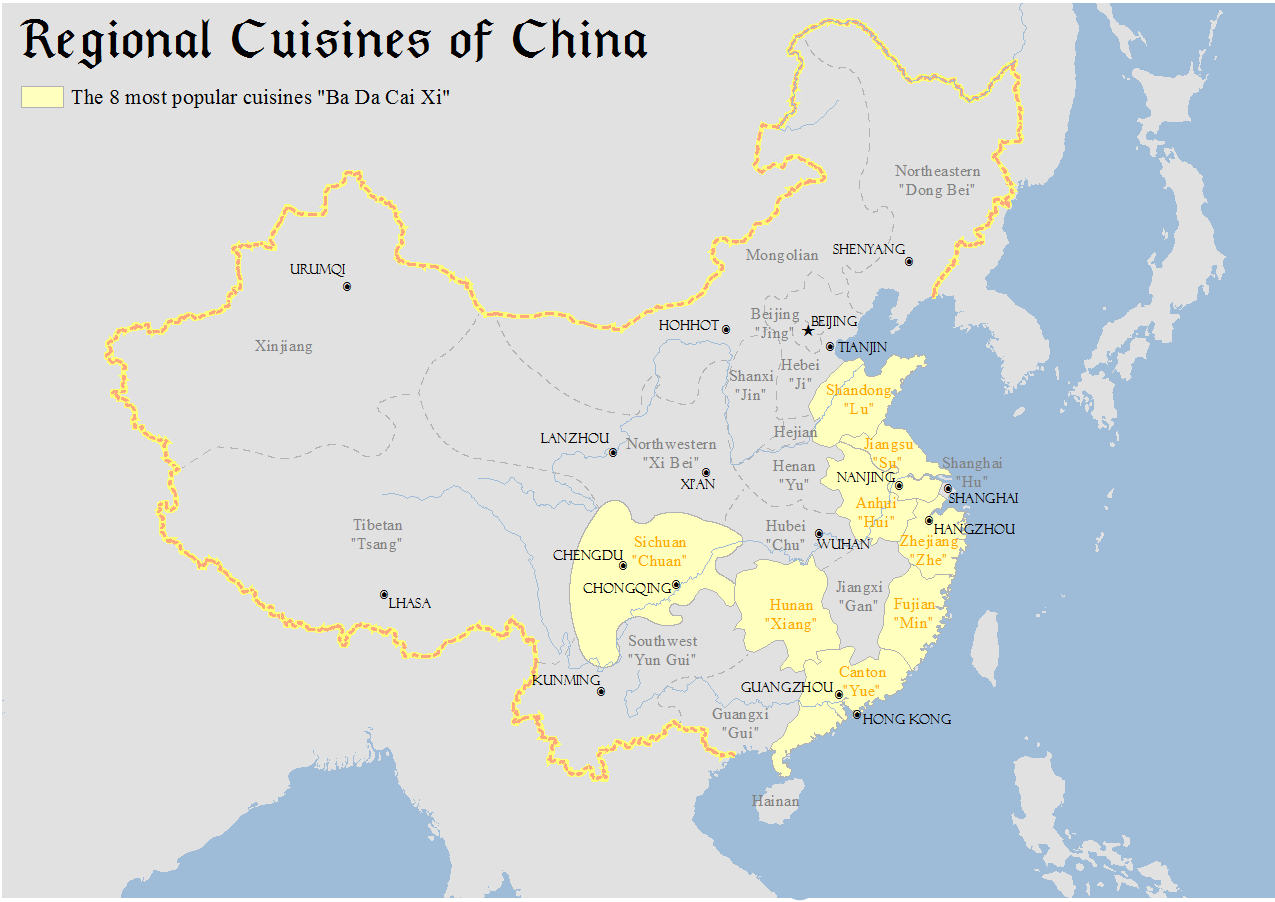
Map showing major regional cuisines of China

Shandong cuisine (simplified Chinese: 山东菜; traditional Chinese: 山東菜; pinyin: Shāndōngcài), more commonly known in Chinese as Lu cuisine (魯菜), is one of the Eight Culinary Traditions of Chinese cuisine and one of the Four Great Traditions (四大菜系). It is derived from the native cooking style of Shandong Province, a northern coastal province of China.

== Features ==
Shandong cuisine is famous for its wide selection of material and use of different cooking methods. The raw materials are mainly domestic animals and birds, seafood and vegetables. The masterly cooking techniques include bao (爆; quick frying), liu (溜; quick frying with corn flour), pa (扒; stewing), kao (烤; roasting), zhu (煮; boiling), and coating sugar onto fruits with honey as the adhesive.

== Styles ==
Shandong cuisine is mainly divided into three sub-regional styles: Jinan and Jiaodong, and Kongfu.

- Jiaodong cuisine (胶东菜; 膠東菜; Jiāodōng cài): refers to the food on the Shandong Peninsula. The location is surrounded by sea on three sides, and therefore has a variety of seafood with an emphasize on light and fresh flavor.
- Jinan cuisine (济南菜; 濟南菜; Jìnán cài): made up of dishes from Jinan, Dezhou, Tai'an and the surrounding regions. One of its features is the use of soup.
- Confucian cuisine, a.k.a. Kongfu cuisine (孔府菜; Kǒngfǔ cài): primarily distributed in Jining and Qufu. Kongfu cuisine has been preserved due to the special status of the Confucius family. It features a variety of cooking techniques, such as braising, stir-frying, stewing, frying, and grilling. Its preparation is complex, often requiring three to four steps to complete.

== Influence ==
Although less available in overseas Chinese restaurants, Shandong cuisine is considered one of the most influential schools in Chinese cuisine. Modern cuisines in North China (Beijing, Tianjin and the Manchuria) are branches of Shandong cuisine, and meals in most Northern Chinese households are typically prepared using simplified Shandong methods.

During the Spring and Autumn period (770-221 BCE), there were 2 influential states, Qi and Lu. Both states, with mountains and fertile plains, were economically and culturally developed and had abundant aquatic products, grains and sea salt. Some of the earliest known descriptions of Chinese culinary methods come from the states. Yi Ya, a retainer of Duke Huan of Qi, was renowned for his culinary skill. Confucius (who was born in the Lu state) was quoted in the Analects as saying, "One should not indulge overly in fine flour, or in kuai (a dish akin to carpaccio) that is sliced too thinly". About food, he recommended: "Do not consume food which looks spoiled, smells spoiled, is out of season, is improperly butchered, or is not made with its proper seasoning".

The cuisine as it is known today was created during the Yuan dynasty. It gradually spread to northern and northeastern China. In Beijing and Tianjin, it influenced Imperial cuisine. Shandong cuisine is primarily made up of Jiaodong and Jinan dishes.

== Ingredients ==
Although modern transportation has increased the availability of ingredients throughout China, Shandong cuisine remains rooted in tradition. It is noted for its variety of seafood, including scallop, prawn and shrimp, clam, sea cucumber and squid.

=== Maize ===
Shandong is unique for its use of maize, a local cash crop not widely cultivated in northern China. Unlike the sweet corn of North America, Shandong maize is chewy and starchy, and often has a grassy aroma. It is served as steamed (or boiled) cobs, or the kernels are removed from the cob and lightly fried.

=== Peanuts ===
Shandong is noted for its peanuts, which are fragrant and naturally sweet. Large dishes of peanuts (roasted in the shell or shelled and stir-fried with salt) are common at meals, and they are served raw in a number of cold dishes from the region.

=== Grains ===
Shandong uses a variety of small grains. Millet, wheat, oats and barley can be found in the local diet, often eaten as congee or milled and cooked into a variety of steamed and fried breads. People in Shandong tend to prefer steamed breads rather than rice as a staple food.

=== Staple vegetables ===
Despite its agricultural output, Shandong has not traditionally used the variety of vegetables seen in southern Chinese cooking. Potatoes, tomatoes, cabbages, mushrooms, onions, garlic and eggplant are staple vegetables, with grassy greens, sea grasses and bell peppers also common. The large, sweet cabbages grown in central Shandong are known for their delicate flavour and hardiness; a staple of the winter diet in much of the province, they appear in many dishes.

=== Vinegar ===
Shandong's greatest contribution to Chinese cuisine is arguably its vinegar. Hundreds of years of experience and unique local methods have led to the region's prominence in Chinese vinegar production. Unlike the lighter, sharper types of vinegar popular in the south, Shandong vinegar has a complexity which some consider fine enough to stand alone.

Some well-known dishes in Shandong cuisine

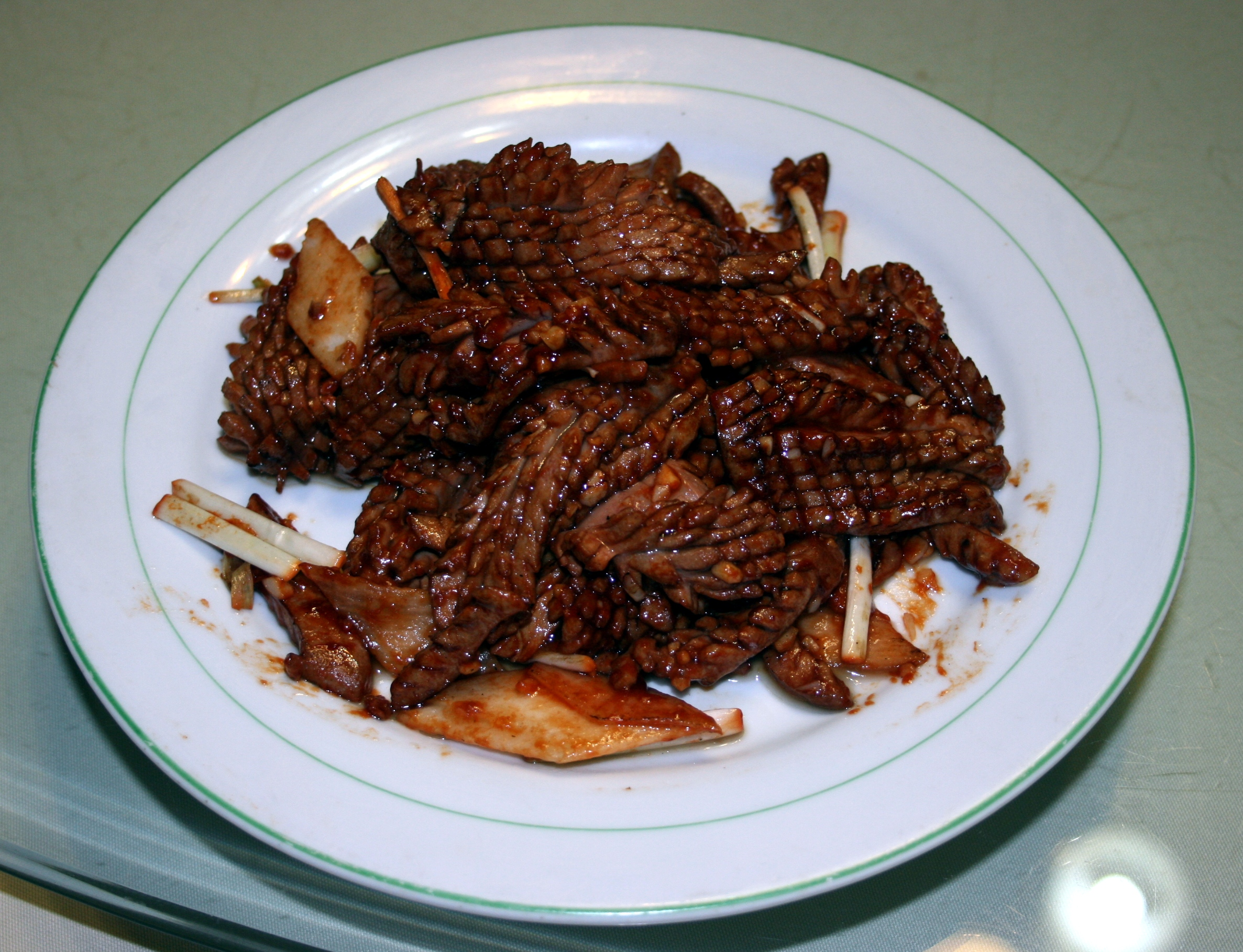
Stir-fried pig's kidney (爆炒腰花; bàochǎoyāohuā)

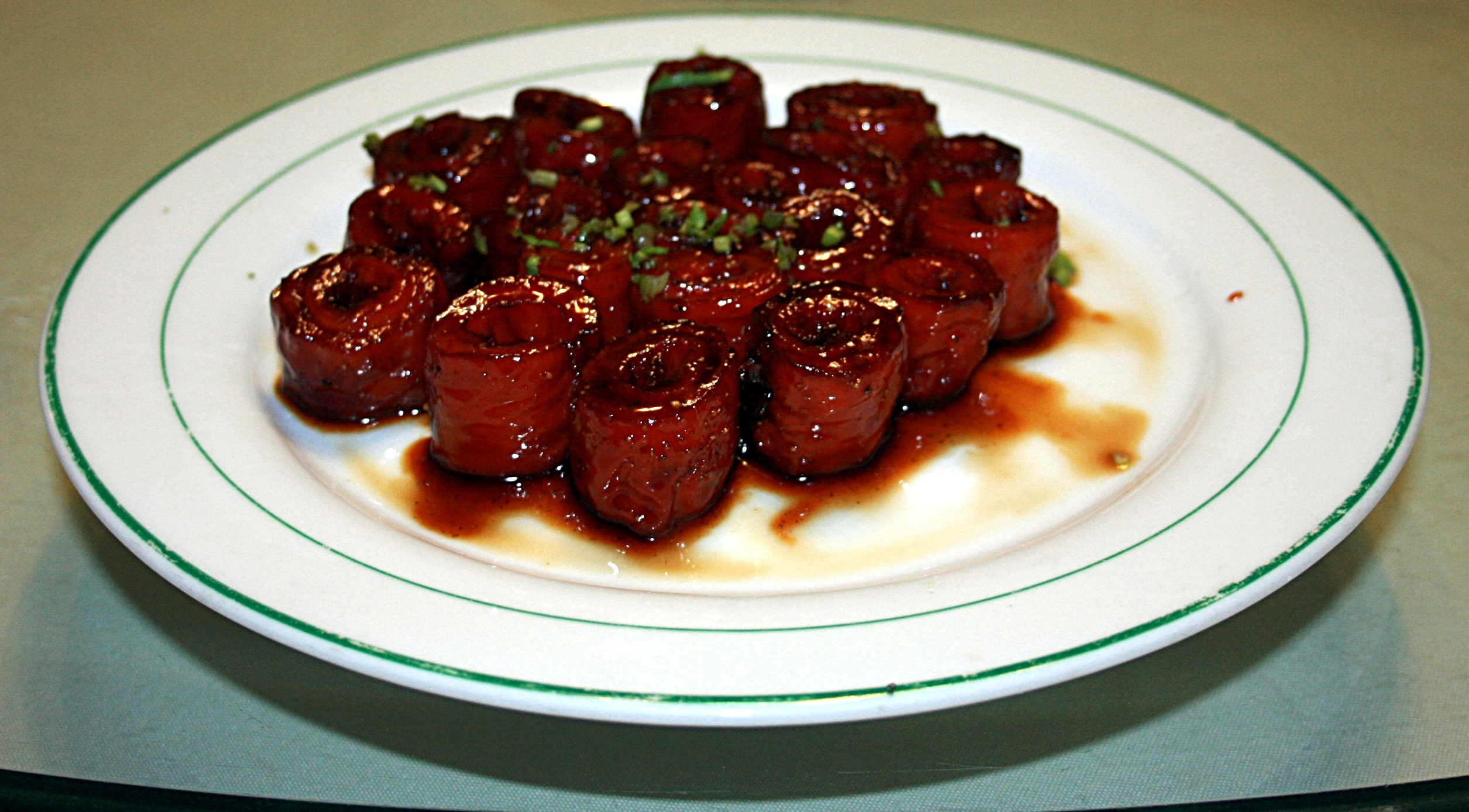
Pig's large intestine (九曲大肠; 九曲大腸; jiǔqū dàcháng; 'nine-coiled large intestine')

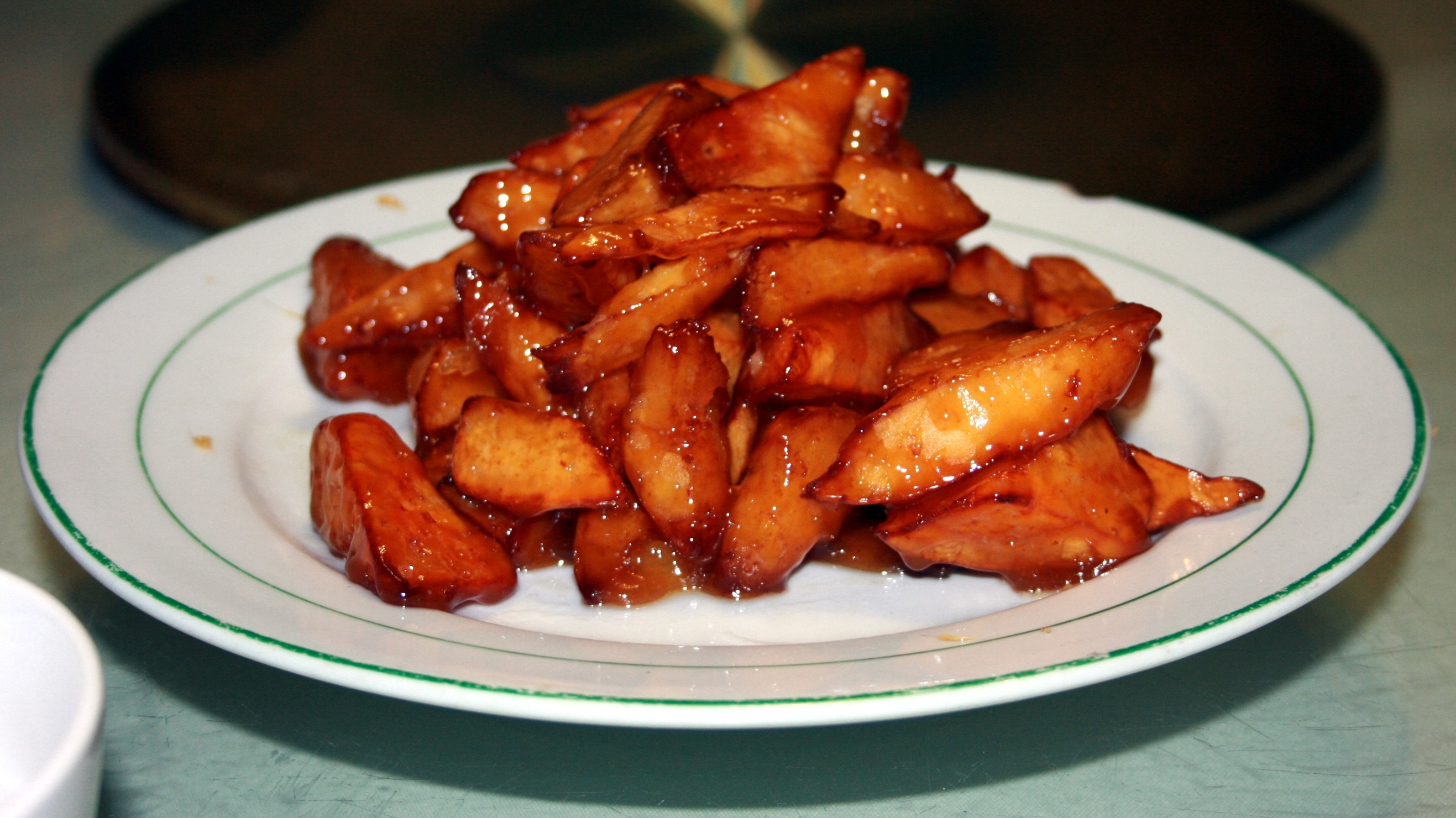
Sweet potato with caramelised sugar (拔丝地瓜; 拔絲地瓜; básī dìguā; 'pull-out silk sweet potato')

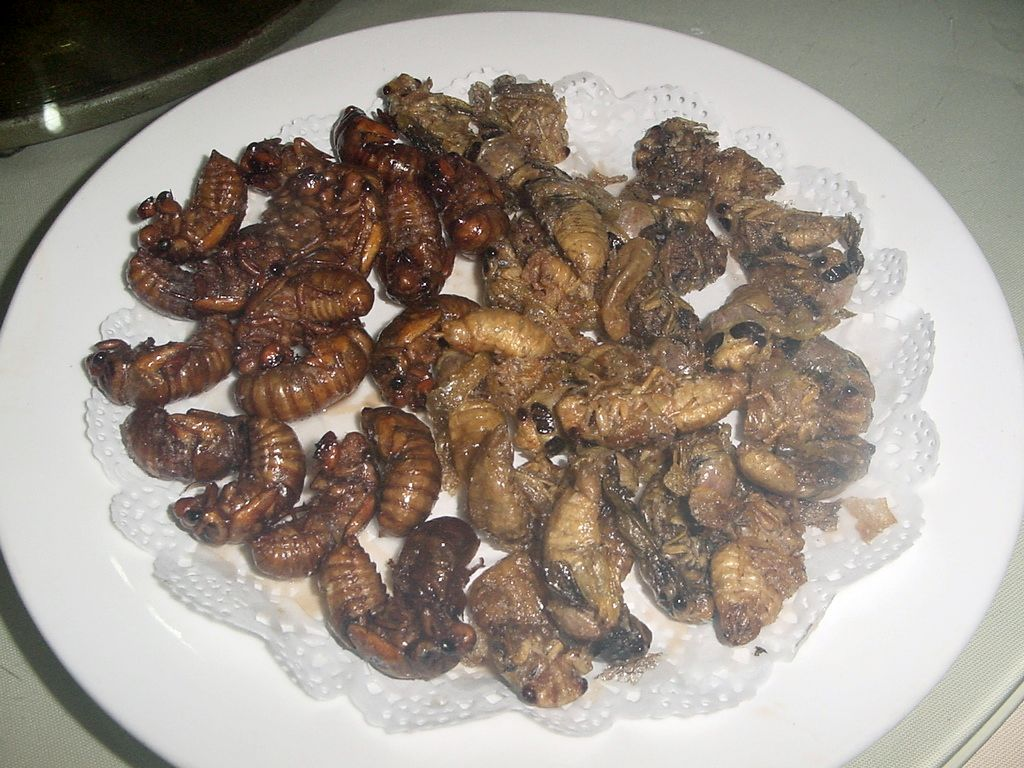
Deep-fried golden cicada (炸金蝉; 炸金蟬; zhájīnchán

== See also ==
- Dezhou braised chicken
- List of Chinese dishes
