= Monkey meat =

Type of bushmeat derived from monkeys

Monkey meat is the flesh and other edible parts derived from monkeys, a kind of bushmeat. Human consumption of monkey meat has been historically recorded in numerous parts of the world, including multiple Asian and African nations. Monkey meat consumption has been reported in parts of Europe and the Americas as well.

== By region ==
=== Africa ===
==== Liberia ====
A 2014 documentary by Vice News found that Liberia has a burgeoning monkey meat industry, with locals describing it as a "sweet" meat and expressing indifference to the risk of contracting the Ebola virus disease associated with monkey meat consumption in Africa.

==== Republic of the Congo ====
The Congolese view monkey meat as an "ordinary delicacy" and a "must-eat", and it is commonly served grilled, boiled, or fried; monkey carcasses are highly valued, and are worth between 20,000 and 40,000 francs. A Nairobi News reporter covering the 2015 All Africa Games in Brazzaville observed that "residents scramble" for monkey meat, but are not as fond of the meats of other primates including baboon and chimpanzee. Miss Waldron's red colobus, which was native to west and central Africa, was supposedly "eaten to extinction" in 2001.

==== Cameroon ====
Approximately 80 percent of all meat consumed in Cameroon is some form of bushmeat. Flesh from monkeys and apes is prized for its supposed succulence, with approximately 3,000 gorillas killed each year for illegal meat markets.

==== Central African Republic ====
Consumption of monkey meat is reportedly legal and popular in the country where hunger is widespread.

==== South Sudan ====
Consuming monkey meat is a defining feature of the Bari people, who "perceive the eating of monkey meat as a boundary between them and non-indigenous people"; in recent years, however, some Bari tribe members have shied away from the practice because of how similar monkeys look to humans.

=== Americas ===
==== United States ====
A 2007 report by The New York Times documented several instances of monkey meat being secretly imported into the United States under the guise of other meats. It is illegal to import bushmeat into the United States. Monkey meat found at the country's border entries will be seized and destroyed by border customs agents, along with any belongings that come with it. People may be fined US$250,000 for importing monkey meat.

==== Mexico ====
Spider monkey dishes are popular among natives from Southern Mexico. The animals are hunted yearlong despite being prohibited between March 1 and October 31. In Los Tuxtlas, Veracruz, consumption of monkey meat was popular prior to the 2010s. As people began consuming more meat, monkey population in the region declined and monkey meat became less available.

=== Brazil ===
The Marubo native tribe of Amazonia are known for eating animals such as tapir, deer and monkey in soups.

=== Asia/Pacific ===
==== Cambodia ====
In October 2016, a raid was conducted on a market in Stung Treng, and resulted in the confiscation of two kilograms of dried monkey meat.

==== China ====
Monkey meat has traditionally been viewed as a "prized" delicacy in Chinese cuisine, and is also believed to have medicinal qualities. In early 1934, the consumption of monkey meat alongside that of monkey brains was banned in Guangdong; an edict declared that "monkeys possess many of the traits of man, and also a considerable amount of intelligence, and should therefore be given protection." The order was purportedly given by Chen Jitang.

==== India ====
In April 2014, photographs of "hundreds" of monkey carcasses meant for consumption in Chhattisgarh went viral; despite the outcry by animal activists, however, government officials did little to address the issue, and even expressed scepticism at the photographs, as monkeys are sacred in most parts of India west of the Siliguri corridor.

==== Indonesia ====
Indonesia is predominantly Muslim, and most Indonesians do not consume monkey meat. However, in Sulawesi, the Minahasan, a non-Muslim minority group, are known monkey eaters, and consider the crested black macaque a delicacy.

==== Vietnam ====
In September 2015, an endangered red-shanked douc was killed live at a Vietnamese eatery in Vu Quang. The carcass was reportedly sold for two million Vietnamese dong.

== Risks ==
The consumption of monkey meat may be detrimental to one's health. An August 1992 study published in the Journal of Tropical Medicine Hygiene reported nine cases of salmonellosis attributed to monkey meat consumption. As the human genetic make-up is similar to that of monkeys, humans are susceptible to catching diseases and viruses that may be present in the monkey flesh.

== Detection ==
Ali et al. 2015 and Rashid et al. 2015 provide tests for characteristic protein sequences to detect monkey meat. This is especially a concern for some Muslim societies.

== See also ==
- Monkey brains
- Bushmeat
- Dog meat
