= Dezhou braised chicken =

Chinese dish from the city of Dezhou in Shandong Province, China

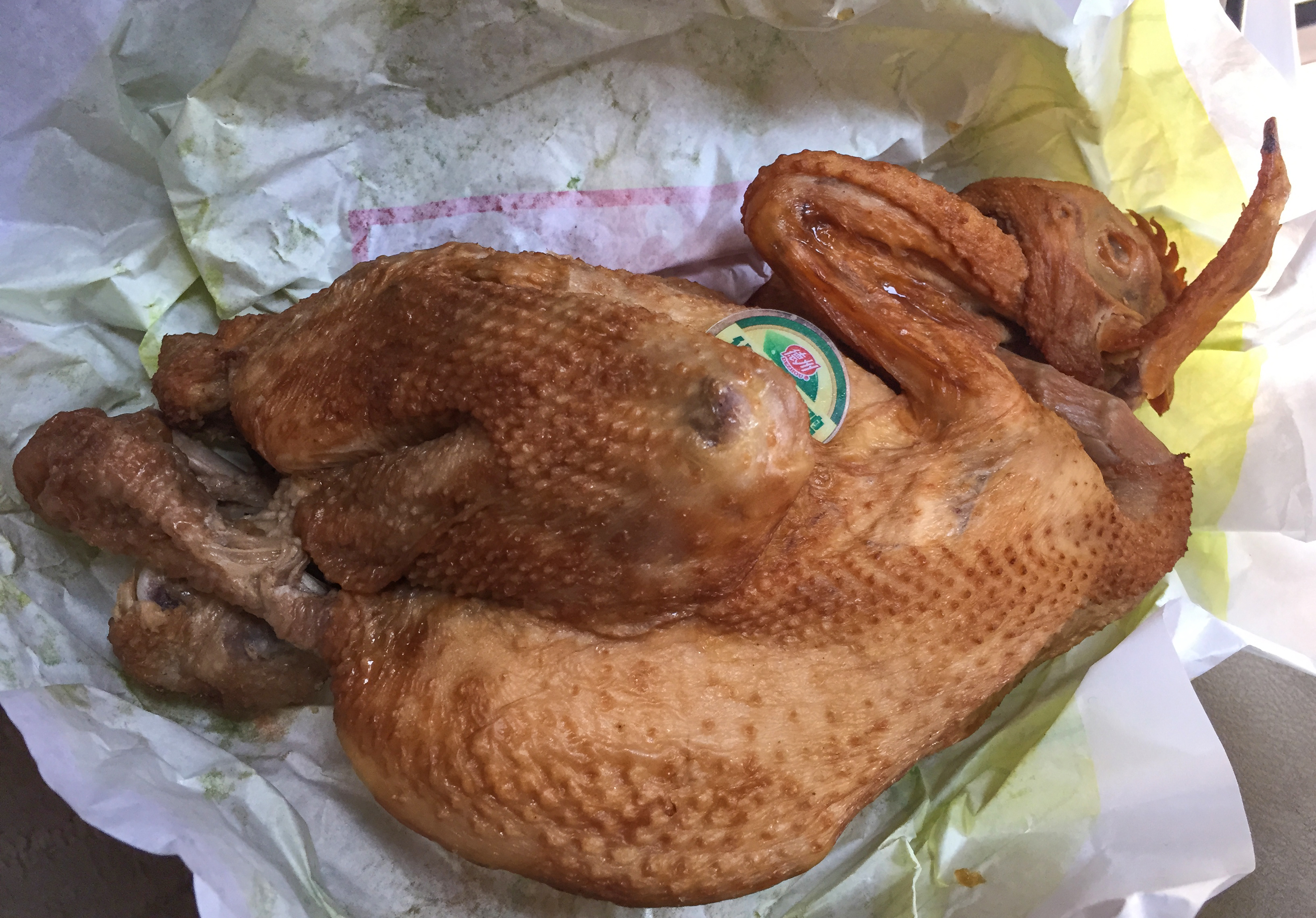
- Dezhou braised chicken offered on a China Railway High-speed train
- Course: Main dish
- Place of origin: China
- Region or state: Shandong
- Associated cuisine: Shandong cuisine
- Main ingredients: chicken, soy sauce, etc.

Dezhou braised chicken
- Traditional Chinese: 德州扒雞
- Simplified Chinese: 德州扒鸡
Transcriptions
Standard Mandarin
- Hanyu Pinyin: Dézhōu-pá-jī

Dezhou braised chicken (simplified Chinese: 德州扒鸡; traditional Chinese: 德州扒雞; pinyin: Dézhōu pá jī) is a Chinese dish from the city of Dezhou in Shandong Province, China.

Braised chicken is a traditional dish from Dezhou, and it is also known as "Dezhou Five-fragrant Boneless Braised Chicken" (Chinese: 德州五香脱骨扒鸡; pinyin: Dézhōu Wǔxiāng Tuōgǔ Pá Jī). It was developed by the Deshunzhai (德顺斋, Déshùnzhāi) Restaurant in Dezhou in the era of Guangxu of the Qing Dynasty.

== History ==
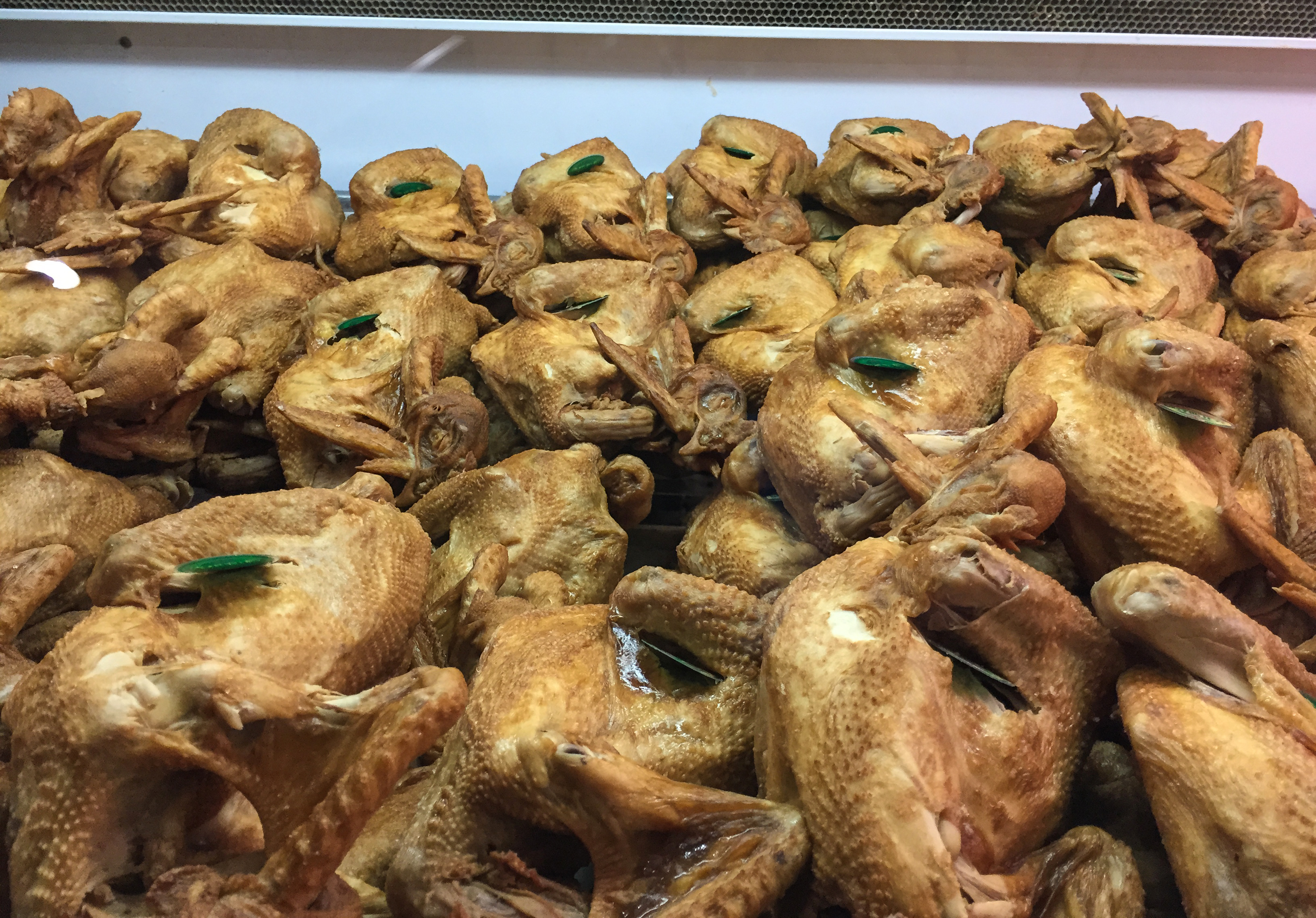
Sold in Dezhou

The dish is named for its origin in Dezhou, Shandong province. The full name of Dezhou braised chicken is "Dezhou five-spice bone-shed braised chicken" because the chicken is tender. It was reported by Dezhou City Annals and the Dezhou History that in 1616 the Han Chinese began to use several fragrances to stew bone chicken, which was transmitted from generation to generation. When the Qianlong Emperor (1711–1799) of the Qing dynasty traveled to Dezhou, he ordered the Han Chinese to cook braised chicken and praised it as "a miracle of all dishes". Dezhou braised chicken became the royal tribute. In 1911, Han Shigong improved traditional cooking methods and modified the cooking methods to add more ingredients. After the improvement, the chicken was more delicious. In the early 1950s, more than 20 descendants of the Han Chinese had built a partnership to produce the braised chicken. Then they opened a shop in a local train station, selling their specialty to tourists. The dish quickly became popular: travelers spread the word about the delicious chicken, and soon it gained national fame. In 1956, their descendants joined the Dezhou branch of the China Food Company. They worked together to make this dish more appetizing. In 2006, the production of Dezhou braised chicken was listed as an intangible cultural heritage of Shandong Province.

== See also ==
- Shandong cuisine
- Chinese cuisine
