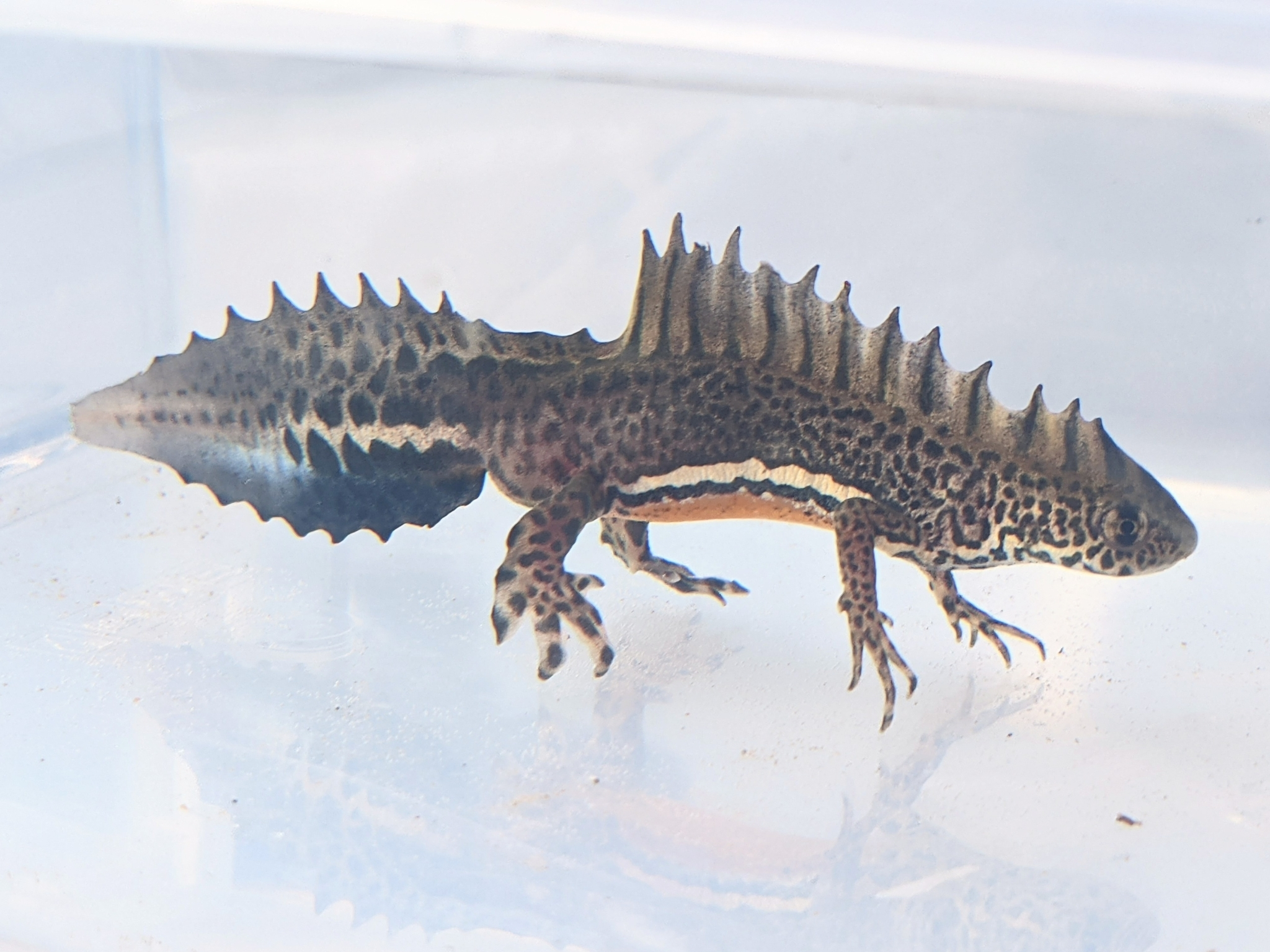

Conservation status
- Near Threatened (IUCN 3.1)

Scientific classification
- Kingdom: Animalia
- Phylum: Chordata
- Class: Amphibia
- Order: Urodela
- Family: Salamandridae
- Genus: Ommatotriton
- Species: O. ophryticus

Binomial name
- Ommatotriton ophryticus (Berthold, 1846)

Synonyms
- Triton ophryticus Berthold, 1846; Triturus vittatus ophryticus Triturus ophryticus ophryticus — Litvinchuk et al., 2005

= Ommatotriton ophryticus =

Species of amphibian

Ommatotriton ophryticus, the northern banded newt, is a species of newt in the family Salamandridae. It is found in northeastern Turkey and western Caucasus in Georgia, Armenia, and southern Russia.

== Taxonomy ==
Ommatotriton ophryticus has been considered a subspecies of Ommatotriton vittatus, but in 2005 Litvinchuk and colleagues raised it to full species status. They also described a new subspecies under this taxon, Triturus ophryticus nesterovi, now recognized as a separate species Ommatotriton nesterovi.

== Description ==
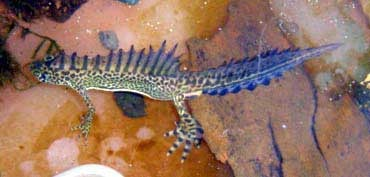

The tail is about the same length as the body and head. The limbs and digits are long, more so in males. Skin is almost smooth to slightly granular. During the terrestrial phase, the dorsum is reddish. During the aquatic phase, the dorsal and lateral surfaces are bronze-olive or olive-brown; there are small dark points on the back and a light band on flanks bordered with dark stripes. The belly is immaculate yellow to orange. During the breeding season, adult males develop very high and notched middorsal and caudal crest; the colouration is yellowish or brownish, with dark vertical stripes. Furthermore, their tails are covered with dark spots from above and with blue and/or greenish spots elsewhere.

== Habitat and conservation ==
Ommatotriton ophryticus occurs mostly higher than 1,200 m (3,900 ft) above sea level. It typically lives in coniferous, mixed, and deciduous forests, up to subalpine meadows. Reproduction takes places in a large range of water bodies, from temporary ponds to lakes. Hibernation generally takes place on land, although individuals in breeding colours have been found in water as early as January. The terrestrial habitat may be relatively arid.

Ommatotriton ophryticus can be locally common, but it is sporadically distributed over much of its range. It suffers from habitat loss caused forest destruction, dam construction, destruction of wetlands, overgrazing by cattle, urbanization, and pollution. Predation by introduced raccoons (Procyon lotor) is also a major threat. It is also collected for the pet trade.
