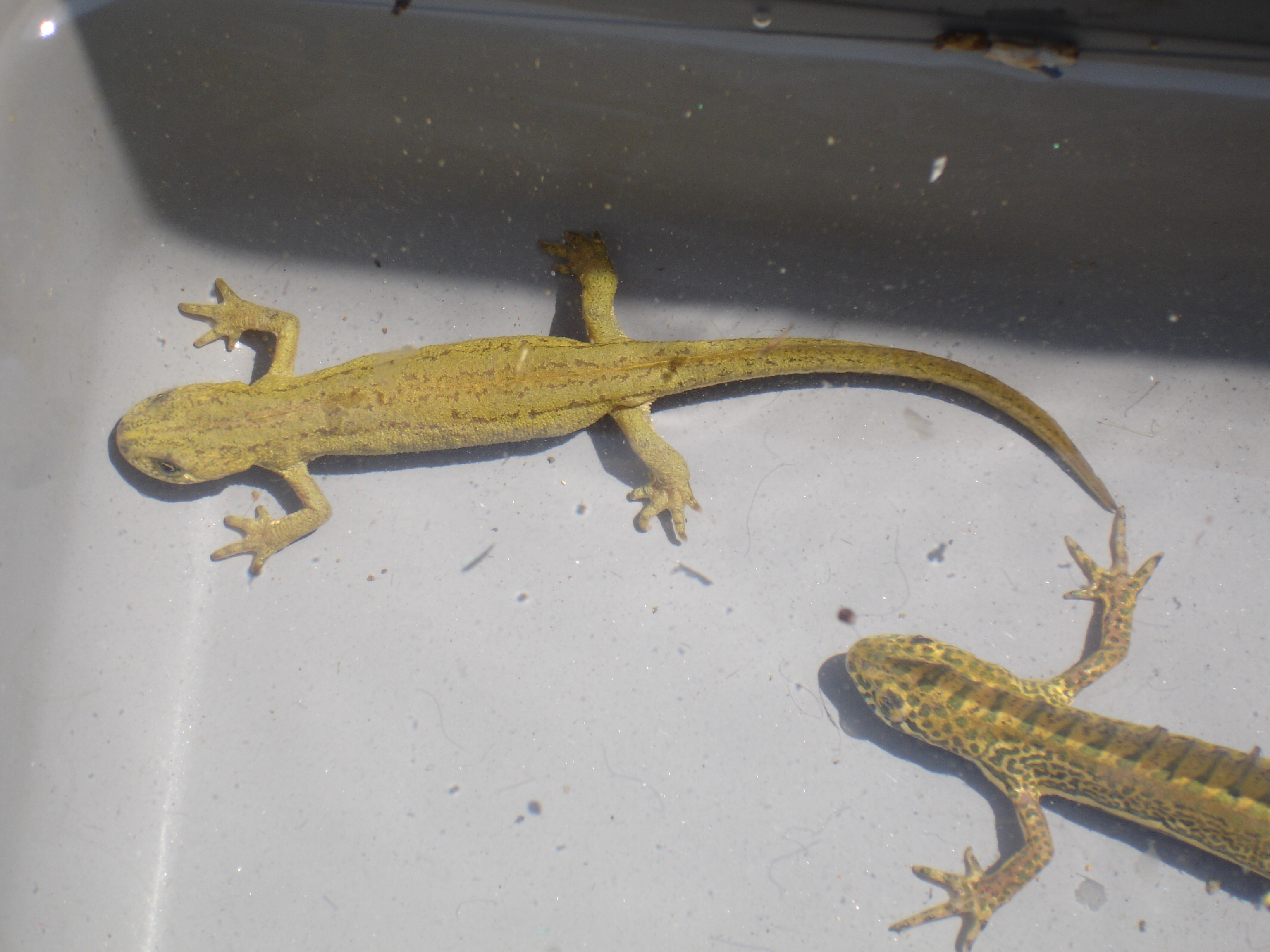
- Southern banded newt (Ommatotriton vittatus)

Scientific classification
- Kingdom: Animalia
- Phylum: Chordata
- Class: Amphibia
- Order: Urodela
- Family: Salamandridae
- Subfamily: Pleurodelinae
- Genus: Ommatotriton; Gray, 1850

Species
- 3 species (see text)

= Ommatotriton =

Genus of amphibians

Ommatotriton or banded newts is a genus of salamanders in the family Salamandridae. The genus occurs in Western Asia and Caucasus. The species in this genus were formerly placed in the genus Triturus.

== Taxonomy ==
The genus contains three species:

- Ommatotriton nesterovi (Litvinchuk, Zuiderwijk, Borkin, and Rosanov, 2005) — Anatolian banded newt
- Ommatotriton ophryticus (Berthold, 1846) — northern banded newt
- Ommatotriton vittatus (Gray, 1835) — southern banded newt
