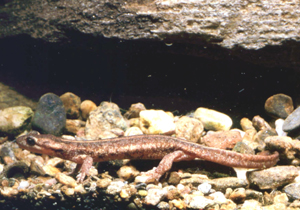
- Euproctus montanus

Scientific classification
- Kingdom: Animalia
- Phylum: Chordata
- Class: Amphibia
- Order: Urodela
- Family: Salamandridae
- Subfamily: Pleurodelinae
- Genus: Euproctus; Gené, 1838

Type species
- Euproctus rusconii Gené, 1838

Diversity
- 2 species (see text)

= Euproctus =

Genus of amphibians

Euproctus, the European mountain salamanders, is a genus of salamanders in the family Salamandridae from Sardinia and Corsica.

== Species ==
There are two species:

| Image | Scientific name | Common name | Distribution |
|---|---|---|---|
| | Euproctus montanus (Savi, 1838) | Corsican brook salamander | Corsica |
| | Euproctus platycephalus (Gravenhorst, 1829) | Sardinian brook salamander | Sardinia, Italy |

The Pyrenean brook salamander used to be included in this genus as Euproctus asper, but was moved to Calotriton in 2005. Its superficial similarity with Euproctus likely represents convergent evolution: strongly depressed head and body, and reduction or even absence of lungs, are adaptations to fast-running, well-oxygenated mountain streams.
