= Neurergus strauchii =

Conservation status
- Vulnerable (IUCN 3.1)

Scientific classification
- Kingdom: Animalia
- Phylum: Chordata
- Class: Amphibia
- Order: Urodela
- Family: Salamandridae
- Genus: Neurergus
- Species: N. strauchii

Binomial name
- Neurergus strauchii (Steindachner, 1887)

Species of amphibian

Neurergus strauchii, the Anatolia newt or Strauch's spotted newt, is one of five species of salamander in the genus Neurergus. It is more specifically a newt, in the family Salamandridae, and is found only in Turkey. Its natural habitats are streams or small rivers, and the nearby forests or shrublands. It is threatened by habitat loss.

They eat earthworms, crickets, daphnia, blackworms, whiteworms, fly larvae, and small waxworms.
