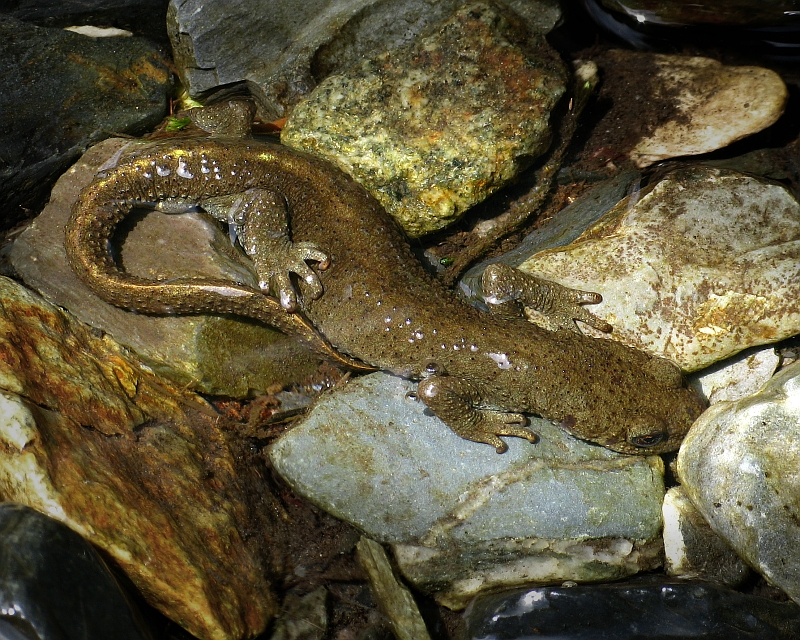
- Pyrenean brook newt (Calotriton asper)

Scientific classification
- Kingdom: Animalia
- Phylum: Chordata
- Class: Amphibia
- Order: Urodela
- Family: Salamandridae
- Subfamily: Pleurodelinae
- Genus: Calotriton; Gray, 1858

Type species
- Hemitriton punctulatus Dugès, 1852

Diversity
- 2 species (see text)

= Calotriton =

Genus of amphibians

Calotriton, or the European brook newts, is a genus of newts native to the Pyrenees and central Catalonia (Catalan Pre-coastal Range). These amphibians were formerly placed within genus Euproctus, but the genus was resurrected in 2005. Instead of Euproctus, they seem more closely related to Triturus, their sister taxon.

== Evolution ==
Calotriton and Triturus are estimated to have split approximately 8 myr ago. This may have been associated with adaptation to fast-running, well-oxygenated mountain streams (instead of ponds in Triturus), leading to some superficial similarity with Euproctus in convergent evolution: strongly depressed head and body, and reduction or even absence of lungs.

== Description ==
Calotriton are small- to medium-sized newts, 70–167 mm (2.8–6.6 in) in total length. Skin is covered with tubercles bearing horny tips, more so above than beneath, which can be completely smooth. Limbs are moderate, with four fingers and five toes. Body is rounded or slightly depressed. There is no cutaneous dorsal and caudal crest, not even during the breeding season. Tail is about as long as head and body and compressed from side; longer in females and deeper in males. Lungs are absent or very reduced.

== Species ==
There are two species:

Image	Scientific name	Common name	Distribution
	Calotriton arnoldi Carranza & Amat, 2005	Montseny brook newt	Montseny Massif (Catalan Pre-Coastal Range) in northeast Spain
	Calotriton asper (Dugès, 1852)	Pyrenean brook newt (formerly Euproctus asper)	the Pyrenees of Andorra, France, and Spain
