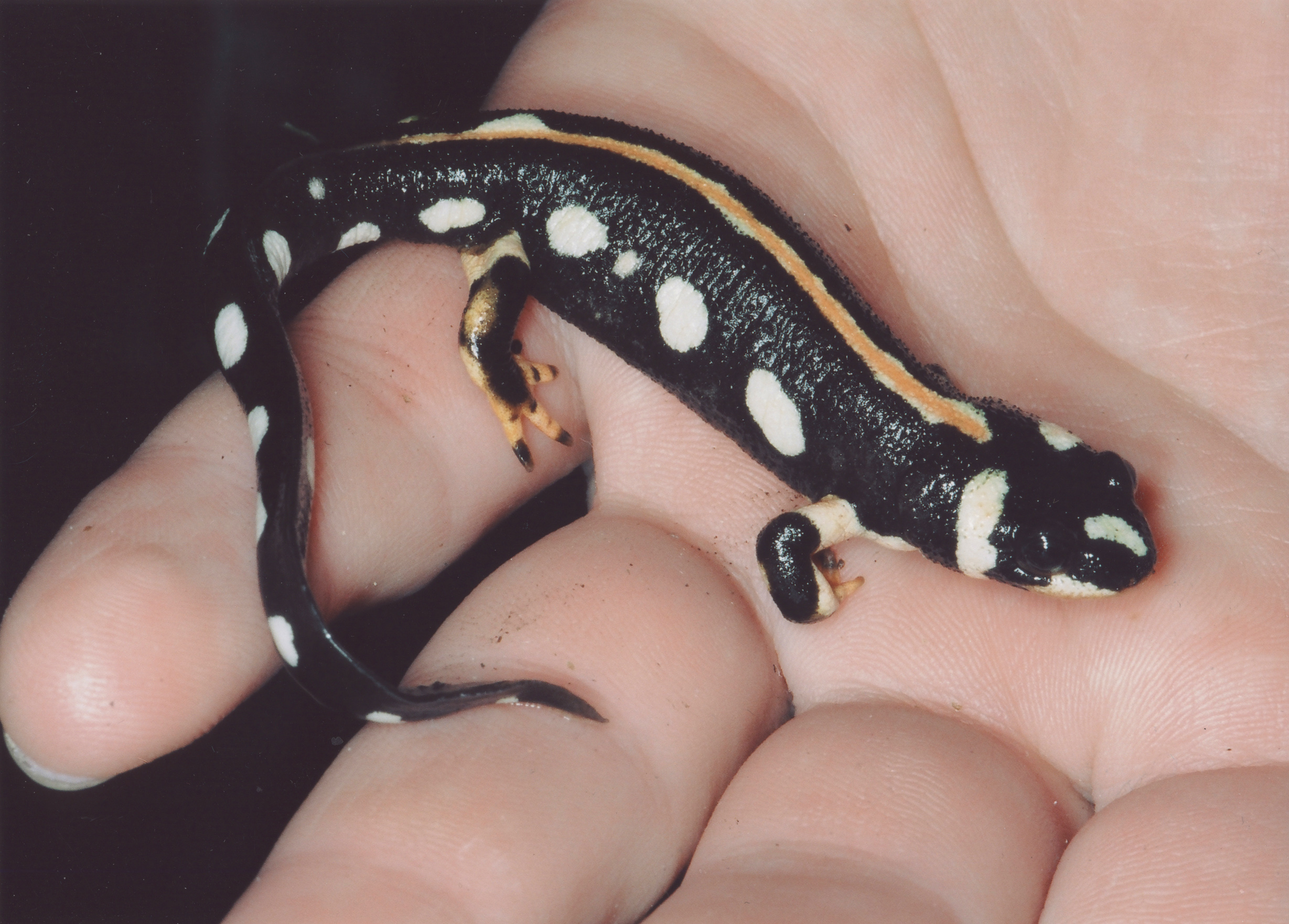
- Neurergus kaiseri

Scientific classification
- Kingdom: Animalia
- Phylum: Chordata
- Class: Amphibia
- Order: Urodela
- Family: Salamandridae
- Subfamily: Pleurodelinae
- Genus: Neurergus; Cope, 1862

= Neurergus =

Genus of amphibians

Neurergus is a genus of salamanders, more specifically newts, in the family Salamandridae. They are found in the Middle East (predominantly in Turkey and Iran), and are kept and bred in captivity for their bright colors. In nature, they inhabit streams and small rivers, and the surrounding forests or shrublands. All of the Neurergus are considered threatened species, primarily due to destruction of habitat and overcollection for the pet trade.

== Morphology ==
Generally, Neurergus species are dark-colored (brown to black) above, with a pattern of white to yellow to orange spots and lines. On their ventral sides, the lighter color of their spots becomes a solid color. Like most salamanders, they have five toes on their hind feet.

== Species ==
Studies have demonstrated the genus Neurergus is monophyletic, containing these species:

Image	Scientific name	Common name(s)	Conservation status	Distribution
	Neurergus barani Öz, 1994	-none-	VU (IUCN)	Turkey
	Neurergus crocatus Cope, 1862	Azerbaijan newt Lake Urmia newt Yellow spotted newt	VU (IUCN)	Iran, Iraq, and Turkey.
	Neurergus derjugini (Nesterov, 1916)	Kurdistan newt	CR (IUCN)	Iran, possibly Iraq, and possibly Turkey.
	Neurergus kaiseri Schmidt, 1952	Luristan newt Kaiser's mountain newt	VU (IUCN)	Southern Zagros Mountains in Iran
	Neurergus strauchii (Steindachner, 1887)	Strauch's spotted newt Anatolia newt	VU (IUCN)	Turkey

== Intrinsic Phylogeny ==
- - Neurergus strauchii
  - - Neurergus kaiseri
    - - Neurergus crocatus
      - Neurergus microspilotus

Intrinsic phylogeny tree of genus Neurergus.
