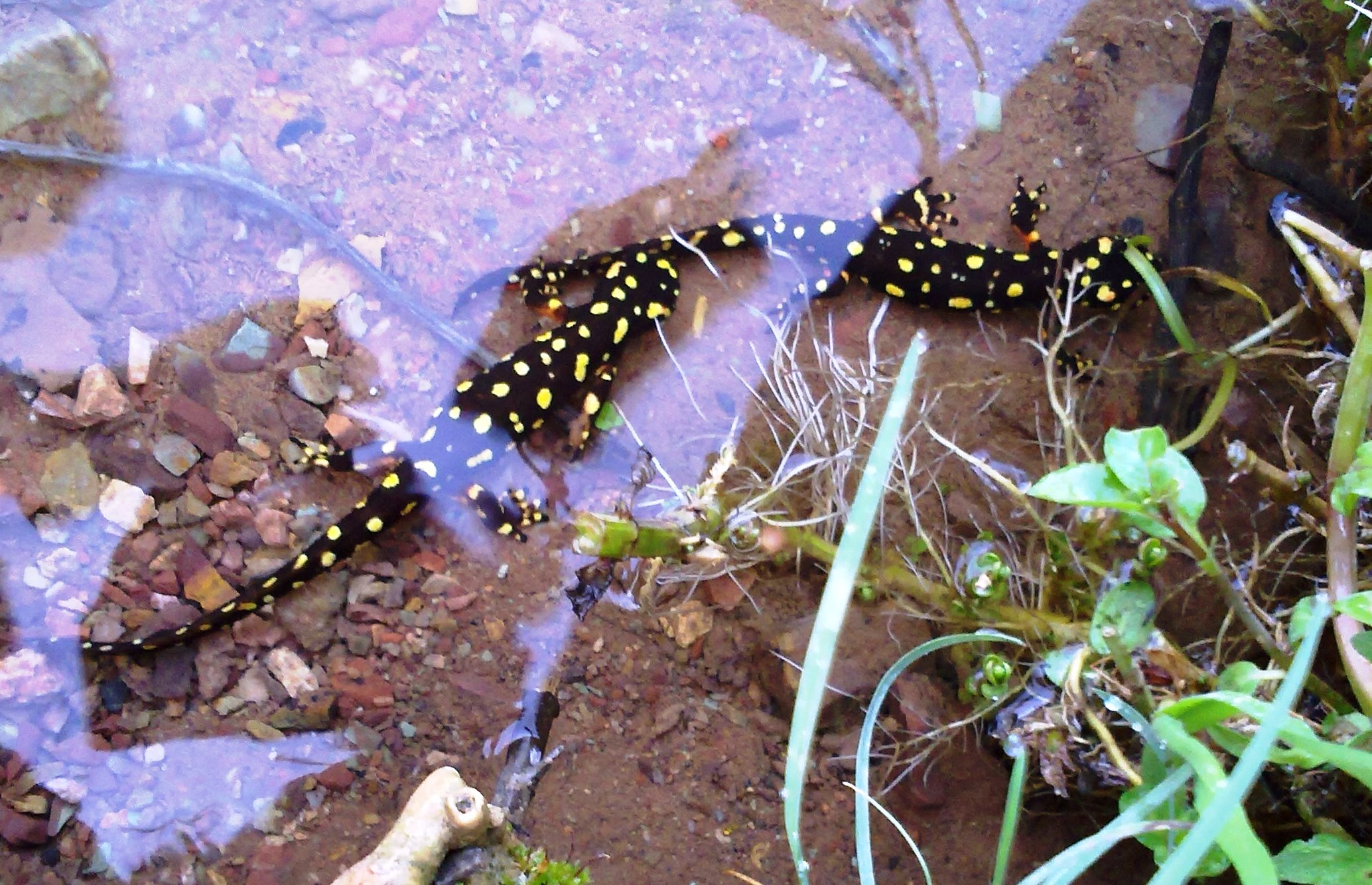
- Neurergus derjugini in Kavat stream, near Ravansar city, Kermansah province, Rojhalat.

Conservation status
- Vulnerable (IUCN 3.1)

Scientific classification
- Kingdom: Animalia
- Phylum: Chordata
- Class: Amphibia
- Order: Urodela
- Family: Salamandridae
- Genus: Neurergus
- Species: N. derjugini

Binomial name
- Neurergus derjugini (Nesterov, 1916)

Synonyms
- Rhithrotriton derjugini Nesterov, 1916; Rhithrotriton derjugini var. microspilotus Nesterov, 1916; Neurergus microspilotus (Nesterov, 1916)

= Kurdistan newt =

Species of salamander

Neurergus derjugini, the Kurdistan newt, Kurdistan newt, Derjugin's (Kurdistan) mountain newt, or yellow-spotted mountain newt, is a species of salamander in the family Salamandridae. It is found in Kurdistan in western Iran and in northeastern Iraq. There are two subspecies, Neurergus derjugini derjugini and Neurergus derjugini microspilotus, the latter is sometimes known as the Avroman Dagh newt.

== Taxonomy ==
The species was first described by Pyotr Nesterov in 1916 based on a population in the Surkev Mountains. He described a second population from the Avroman region as a subspecies microspilotus which varied in the number of yellow spots and the spots being more circular. The two have been considered subspecies and only show minor differences in their mitochondrial DNA sequences and slightly more prominent differences in a nuclear gene sequence.

== Etymology ==
The species name derjugini commemorates the collector Konstantin Deryugin.

== Reproduction ==
Breeding takes place from April to June. Females lay eggs about 6 mm long (including the capsule), either singly or in small groups on vegetation and rocks in the stream. A female may lay around 100 eggs. Older larvae show spotted patterns, and the spots on the belly are usually dark.

== Habitat and conservation ==
Neurergus derjugini occurs in small streams at elevations of 1,300–1,865 m (4,265–6,119 ft) above sea level. It is threatened by droughts, water extraction, pollution, and collection for pet trade. It is known from a small number of populations, most of them very small. Climate change is going to reduce the habitable areas for this species. In a 2021 assessment by the IUCN Red List, it was classified as vulnerable.

== See also ==
- Neurergus crocatus
- Neurergus kaiseri
