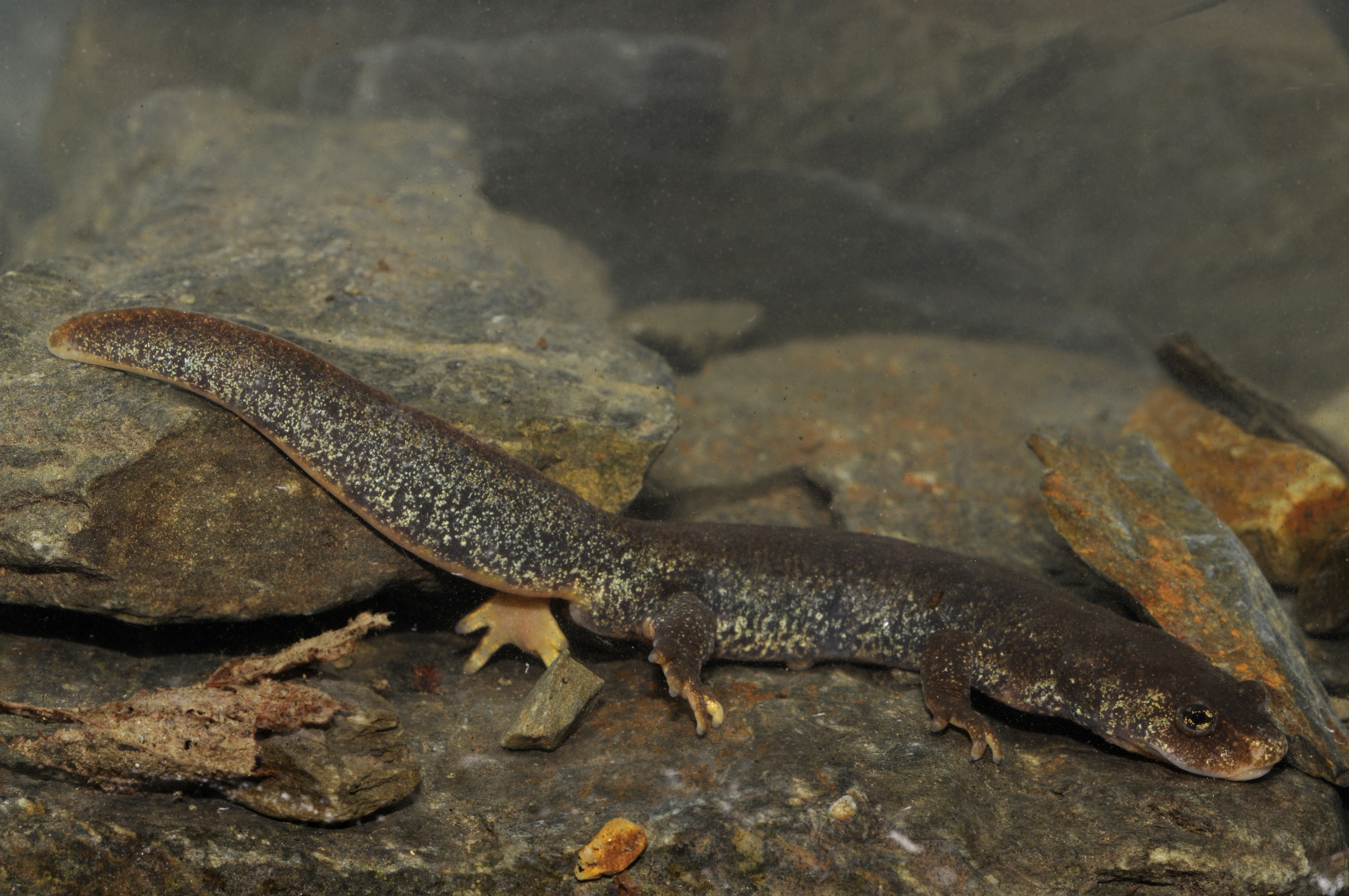

Conservation status
- Critically Endangered (IUCN 3.1)

Scientific classification
- Kingdom: Animalia
- Phylum: Chordata
- Class: Amphibia
- Order: Urodela
- Family: Salamandridae
- Genus: Calotriton
- Species: C. arnoldi

Binomial name
- Calotriton arnoldi Carranza and Amat, 2005
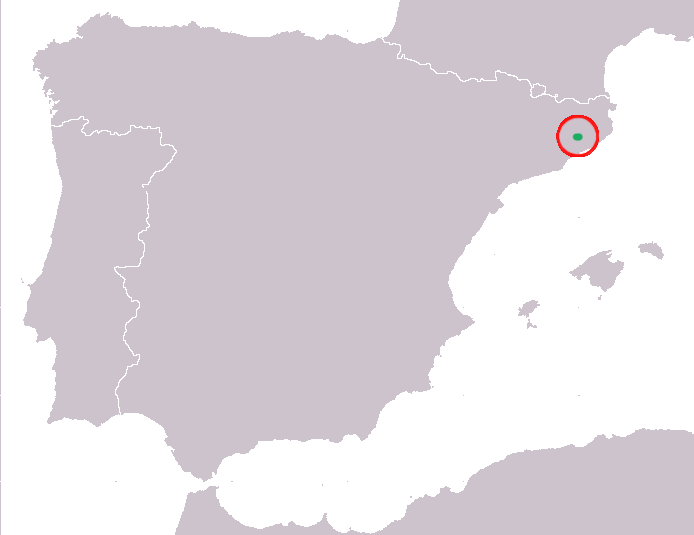

= Montseny brook newt =

Species of salamander

The Montseny brook newt (Catalan: tritó del Montseny; Calotriton arnoldi) is a species of salamander in the family Salamandridae. It is endemic to the Montseny Massif (Catalan Pre-Coastal Range) in northeast Spain. Before it was formally described in 2005, it was mixed with the larger and more widely distributed Pyrenean brook salamander (Calotriton asper, formerly Euproctus asper).

== Description ==
Montseny brook newt males measure 56–59 mm (2.2–2.3 in) and females 57–59 mm (2.2–2.3 in) in snout–vent length. Tail is 34–44 mm (1.3–1.7 in) and the maximum body size is 103 mm (4.1 in). Dorsum is dark, chocolate-coloured. Head is strongly flattened. Body is oval in cross-section and with some dorsoventral compression.

When handled, Montseny brook newts release a whitish, noxious, sticky, and very odorous skin secretion. This is probably a defence mechanism against predators.

== Habitat and conservation ==
Its natural habitats are oligotrophic, cold (under 15 °C) fast running rivers; it seems to be a strictly aquatic species. Its population is supposed to be less than 1,500 individuals with an estimated rate of decline of 15% during the last 10 years as of 2021. The drying out of mountain streams, human alteration of its original habitat and the global warming are threats to this species. Research has shown that the Montseny brook newt, despite preferring colder habitats, are capable of surviving in environments up to a thermal maximum of 31 °C. However, this is not ideal, and if temperatures continue to rise, it is likely that they will have to migrate during warmer periods to find habitat within their optimal temperature range. Because of this, the International Union for Conservation of Nature (IUCN) lists it as "critically endangered".
