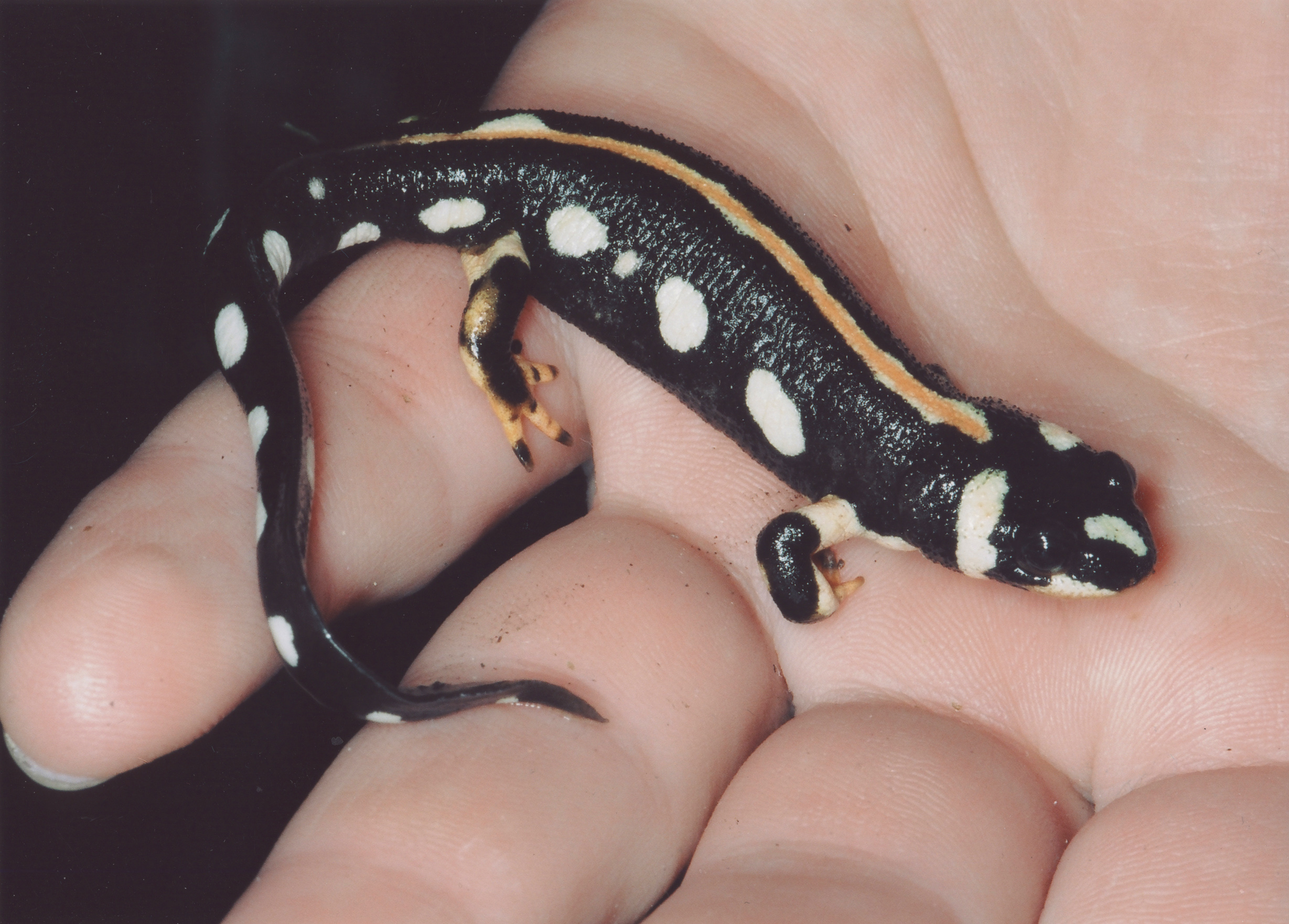

Conservation status
- Vulnerable (IUCN 3.1)
- CITES Appendix I

Scientific classification
- Kingdom: Animalia
- Phylum: Chordata
- Class: Amphibia
- Order: Urodela
- Family: Salamandridae
- Genus: Neurergus
- Species: N. kaiseri

Binomial name
- Neurergus kaiseri Schmidt, 1952
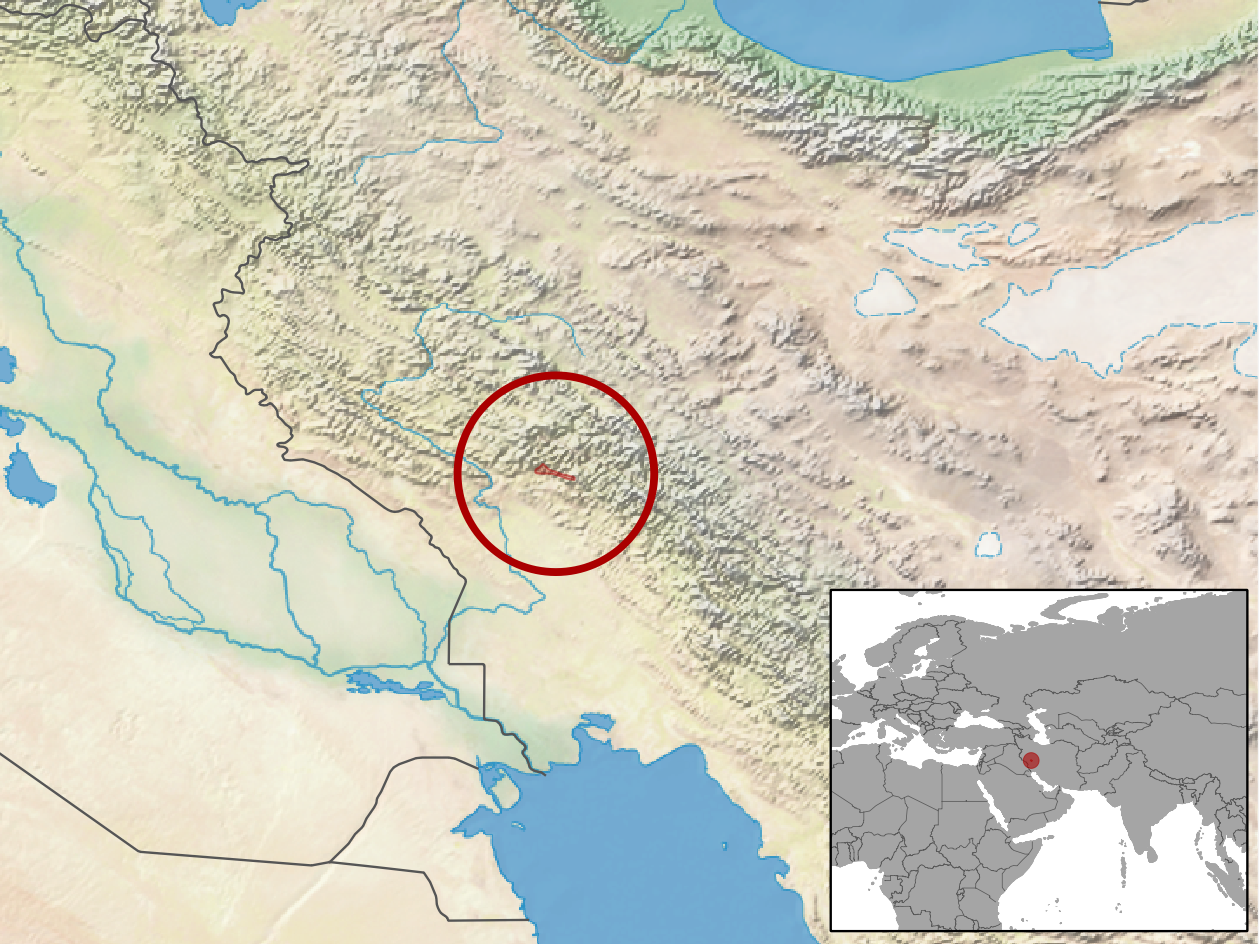

Synonyms
- Neurergus crocatus kaiseri Schmidt, 1952

= Neurergus kaiseri =

Species of salamander

Neurergus kaiseri, the Luristan newt, Kaiser's mountain newt, Kaiser's spotted newt or emperor spotted newt (not to be confused with Tylototriton shanjing), is a species of salamander in the family Salamandridae. It is endemic to the southern Zagros Mountains in Iran where it is known from just four streams. Populations of this newt have been declining and the International Union for Conservation of Nature has rated it as "vulnerable". A captive breeding programme has been established in several zoos.

== Distribution and habitat ==
The Luristan newt is endemic to the southern Zagros Mountains in Iran. It is primarily found in highland streams surrounded by arid scrubland, but can also be found in ponds and pools. It is known only from four streams in a single catchment area and has a total inhabited area of 8,948 km^{2} (3,454.8 mi^{2}). In a recent study it was found that the area of suitable habitat within their study area was 18,159 km^{2} (7,011.2 mi^{2}). Water is absent from its habitat for a significant part of the year and it moves out into the surrounding woodland which is predominantly oak and pistachio, during which time this species is known to estivate.

Currently the Luristan newt is found in the Zagros Mountains in Iran, but in recent studies it has been concluded that small portions of southern Iran that include Kermanshah, Ilam, Chaharmahal-Bakhtiari, and Kohgiluye-Boyerahmad are habitats that these species will be distributing themselves in the future due do climate change affecting their current habitats.

== Conservation ==
It is considered vulnerable due to its limited and fragmented range (inhabits an area of less than 10,000 km^{2}), continuing habitat loss, and the illegal capture of salamanders for the wild animal trade. In 2008, the wild population was estimated at less than 1000 individuals. However, a new survey in 2014 estimates a population of over 9,000 adults, and range estimate that could provide habitat for more than 40,000 Neurergus kaiseri.

International trade require a permit, as the Luristan newt is listed on CITES Appendix I. It also has a captive breeding program involving several European and North American zoos, such as Sedgwick County Zoo. Iran is planning on starting its own breeding program.

== In captivity ==
The Kaiser's mountain newt has been successfully bred in captivity, with brumation and a controlled diet supporting adaptation. Captive-bred Luristan newts have survived spring and summer after reintroduction under controlled conditions.

== See also ==
- Kurdistan newt
- Neurergus crocatus
