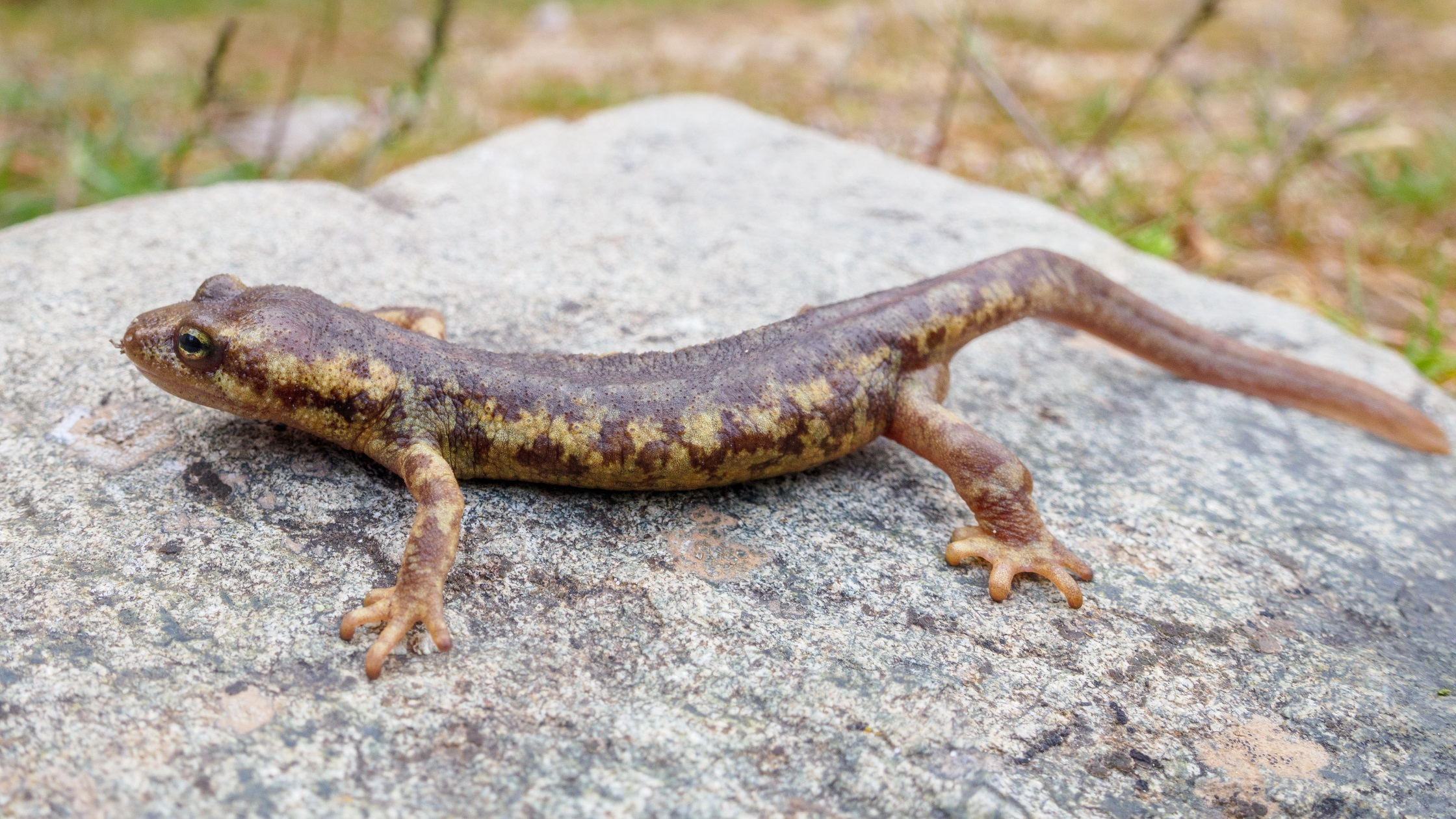

Conservation status
- Least Concern (IUCN 3.1)

Scientific classification
- Kingdom: Animalia
- Phylum: Chordata
- Class: Amphibia
- Order: Urodela
- Family: Salamandridae
- Genus: Euproctus
- Species: E. montanus

Binomial name
- Euproctus montanus (Savi, 1838)

= Corsican brook salamander =

Species of amphibian

The Corsican brook salamander or Corsican mountain newt (Euproctus montanus) is a species of salamander in the family Salamandridae. It is endemic to Corsica, an island in the Mediterranean Sea.

The Corsican brook salamander is found primarily in rocky streams, springs, and rivers in forest and maquis at altitudes of over 600 m.

== Description ==
The Corsican brook salamander is smaller than other closely related species, such as the Sardinian brook salamander (Euproctus platycephalus) and can grow to around 13 cm (5 in) in length, though a more typical size is 10 cm (4 in). The head is long with a rounded snout, and the tail is oval in cross section and as long as the rest of the animal. The parotoid glands on the side of the neck are distinct. The males have spurs on the hind legs and a backwards-pointing conical cloaca, whereas the females have a cloaca with a ventral opening. The skin is smooth when it is living in the water, but becomes more granular when living on land. The colour is brown or olive, sometimes with mottling of orange, red, or brown, particularly near the spine. It has a paler, fairly uniformly coloured underside, sometimes with white flecks, but is not spotted on the throat. The only other salamander on the island is the Corsican fire salamander (Salamandra corsica) which has distinctive black and yellow colouring.

== Distribution and habitat ==
The Corsican brook salamander is endemic to the island of Corsica. It is not present in the eastern lowland areas or near much of the coast, but can be found at altitudes up to 2,250 metres (7,382 ft) and is most common in the range 600 to 1,500 m (2,000 to 4,900 ft). It is mainly aquatic, living in lakes, ponds, and the slower-moving parts of streams, often hiding under stones. When on land, it does not stray far from water and inhabits maquis and woods, where it can be found in the undergrowth or under fallen logs and rocks.

== Biology ==
The Corsican brook salamander lives in well-oxygenated waters where it breathes through its skin. Its lungs are either not present or reduced to vestigial organs. Nevertheless, it can move about on land and hibernates underground during the winter. It enters a terrestrial phase after breeding and is mainly nocturnal, feeding on insects and small invertebrates.

Near the coast, breeding may take place twice a year in spring and early autumn, but at greater altitudes, mating takes place in midsummer. The male grasps the female with his jaws and wraps his tail round her while using his cloaca to deposit one or two spermatophores in her cloaca. She then lays about 30 large, yolky eggs, which are deposited in crevices and under stones, and she guards them until they hatch about 50 days later. The larvae (tadpoles) take about 9 months before they undergo metamorphosis and develop into juveniles.

== Status ==
The Corsican brook salamander is listed as being of "least concern" in the IUCN Red List of Threatened Species, because, although it has a very limited range, it is common in suitable habitats within that range and the population is not believed to be dwindling. Threats that might occur include pollution of the streams and lakes in which it lives, the introduction of trout which compete for food and may also prey on it, and the destruction of its habitat and consequent fragmentation of populations.
