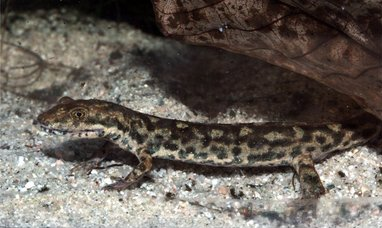

Conservation status
- Endangered (IUCN 3.1)

Scientific classification
- Kingdom: Animalia
- Phylum: Chordata
- Class: Amphibia
- Order: Urodela
- Family: Salamandridae
- Genus: Euproctus
- Species: E. platycephalus

Binomial name
- Euproctus platycephalus (Gravenhorst, 1829)

Synonyms
- Molge platycephala Gravenhorst, 1829

= Sardinian brook salamander =

Species of amphibian

The Sardinian brook salamander or Sardinian mountain newt (Euproctus platycephalus) is a species of salamander in the family Salamandridae found only in Sardinia, Italy.

== Description ==
The Sardinian brook salamander can grow to about 15 cm (6 in) in length, but adults are usually rather smaller than this, with females being a bit larger than males. It is very similar to the Corsican brook salamander, but the head is flatter, the throat is more spotted, and the paratoid glands are smaller. The lower jaw is shorter than the upper jaw. The skin is smooth apart from a few irregularly placed tubercles. The colour is olive, grey, or reddish-brown, often with red, brown, or black spots and longitudinal streaks, and often a thin yellow or brown stripe occurs along the spine. The underside is paler, often having a red or yellow central region and black spots. The male has a spur on each hind limb. The only species with which it is likely to be confused are cave salamanders in the family Plethodontidae.

== Distribution and habitat ==
The Sardinian brook salamander is endemic to the mountainous areas on the east side of the island of Sardinia in the Mediterranean Sea. It is found at altitudes between 50 and 1,800 metres (160 and 5,910 ft), with most sightings being in the middle of this range. It is found in slow-moving streams and rivers, small lakes, and ponds, where it hides under stones. When on land, it is usually found in undergrowth or under stones, and usually stays close to water.

== Biology ==
The Sardinian brook salamander is largely aquatic, though it does hibernate and sometimes aestivate on land near the water's edge. Mating takes place in the water, the male having first carried the passive female in his jaws to a suitable location. He clasps her body with his jaws and bends his body around, wrapping his tail around hers. He transfers spermatophores to her cloaca from his cloaca, sometimes with the aid of his spurs. The female lays up to 220 eggs singly over a period of weeks in crevices and under stones and possibly buried in sand. She forms her mobile cloaca into a tube and turns on her back to deposit them in suitable locations. The larvae take six to 15 months before metamorphosis depending on the water temperature. In 1999, sexually mature adults were reported to have been found with the vestiges of gills, suggesting the species may exhibit paedomorphosis.

== Status ==
The Sardinian brook salamander is classified by the IUCN Red List of Threatened Species as vulnerable, because the area it occupies is less than 500 km^{2} (190 sq mi) in total and fragmented into a number of separate populations. It is threatened by loss of habitat, pollution of watercourses, dry conditions caused by the excessive extraction of water, and disturbance due to tourism. Its numbers appear to be dwindling. Most of the specimens found were male and the species seems to be no longer present in some locations where it was previously found.
