= Neurergus crocatus =

Conservation status
- Vulnerable (IUCN 3.1)

Scientific classification
- Kingdom: Animalia
- Phylum: Chordata
- Class: Amphibia
- Order: Urodela
- Family: Salamandridae
- Genus: Neurergus
- Species: N. crocatus

Binomial name
- Neurergus crocatus Cope, 1862

Species of salamander

Neurergus crocatus, the yellow-spotted newt, Kurdistan newt, Azerbaijan mountain newt, mountain newt, or Lake Urmia newt, is a species of salamander in the family Salamandridae. It occurs in the mountains west of Lake Urmia, in northwestern Iran, northeastern Iraq, and southeastern Turkey. (Note: Despite its vernacular names, this species does not occur in the Republic of Azerbaijan. Instead, "Azerbaijan" here refers to the Azerbaijan region of Iran.)

== Description ==
Neurergus crocatus grow to about 16–18 cm (6.3–7.1 in) in total length; the tail is longer than the body (i.e., tail length>snout–vent length). The head is flattened and longer than it is wide. The snout is rounded. The body is slender and almost round, without a dorsal ridge. The tail is rounded at the base and laterally compressed towards its tip. The tail has moderately developed dorsal and ventral fins. The limbs are well-developed; the digits are thick and flat. Colouration is dorsally dark brown to black with yellow, rounded but somewhat irregular blotches; these continue on the tail. The ventral surfaces are orange-red in males and yellowish in females. They can live for between 12-15 years in captivity, and usually reach sexual maturity in four years.

== Habitat and conservation ==
Neurergus crocatus breed in montane streams at elevations of 1,500–2,000 m (4,900–6,600 ft) above sea level; after the breeding season, adults disperse to the surrounding areas, but their specific microhabitats are unknown. This species is probably threatened by habitat loss, caused by for example new dams.

== See also ==
- Neurergus kaiseri
- Kurdistan newt
