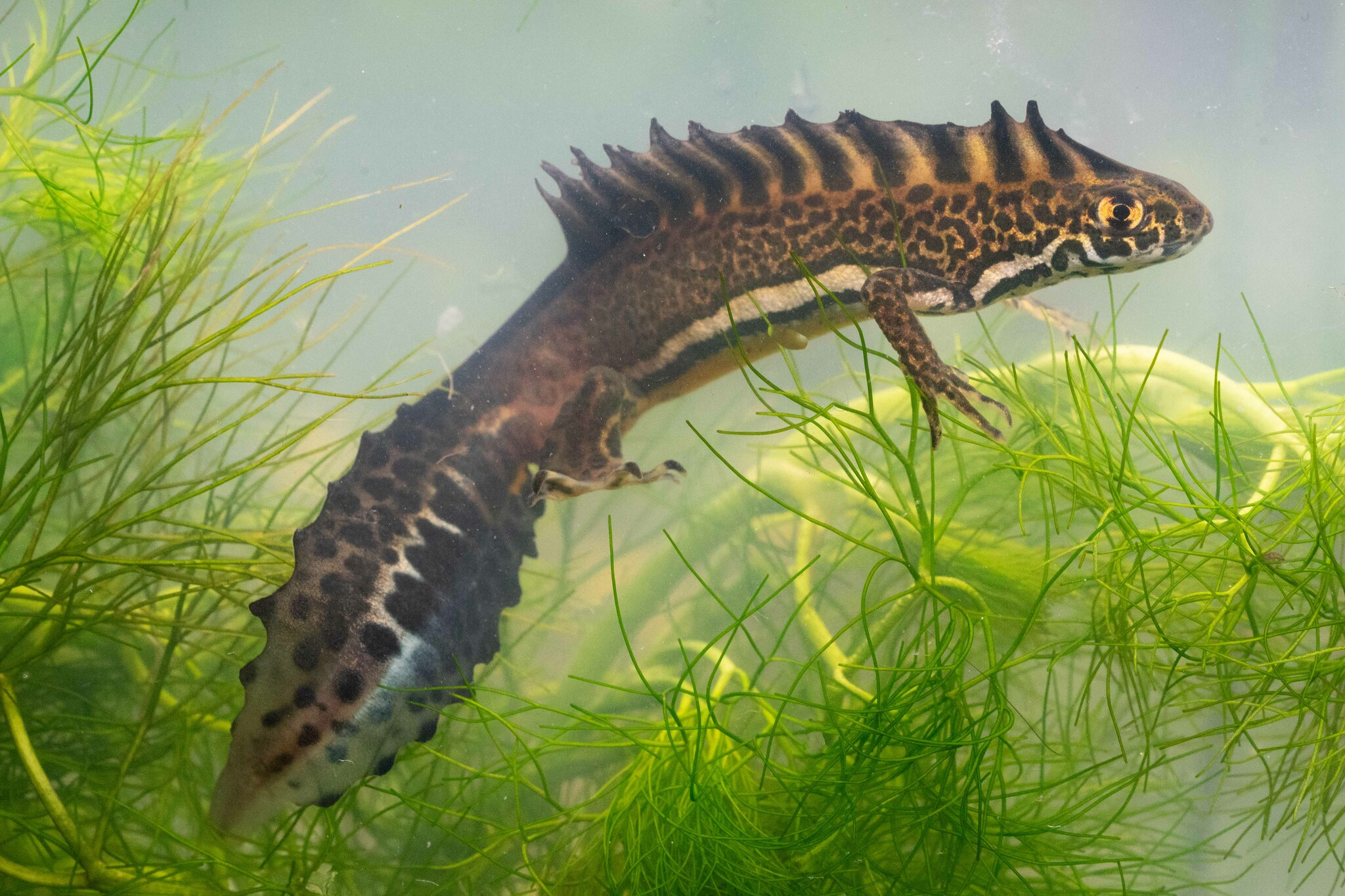
- Male

Scientific classification
- Kingdom: Animalia
- Phylum: Chordata
- Class: Amphibia
- Order: Urodela
- Family: Salamandridae
- Genus: Ommatotriton
- Species: O. nesterovi

Binomial name
- Ommatotriton nesterovi Litvinchuk, Zuiderwijk, Borkin & Rosanov (2005)

= Anatolian banded newt =

Species of amphibian

The Anatolian banded newt (Ommatotriton nesterovi) is a species of salamander in the family Salamandridae, most notably found in Anatolia: a peninsula ranging from the western and northern parts of Turkey.

== Habitat ==
The Anatolian banded newt prefers to reside in forest grasslands that are abundant in trees and vegetation and low in altitude.
