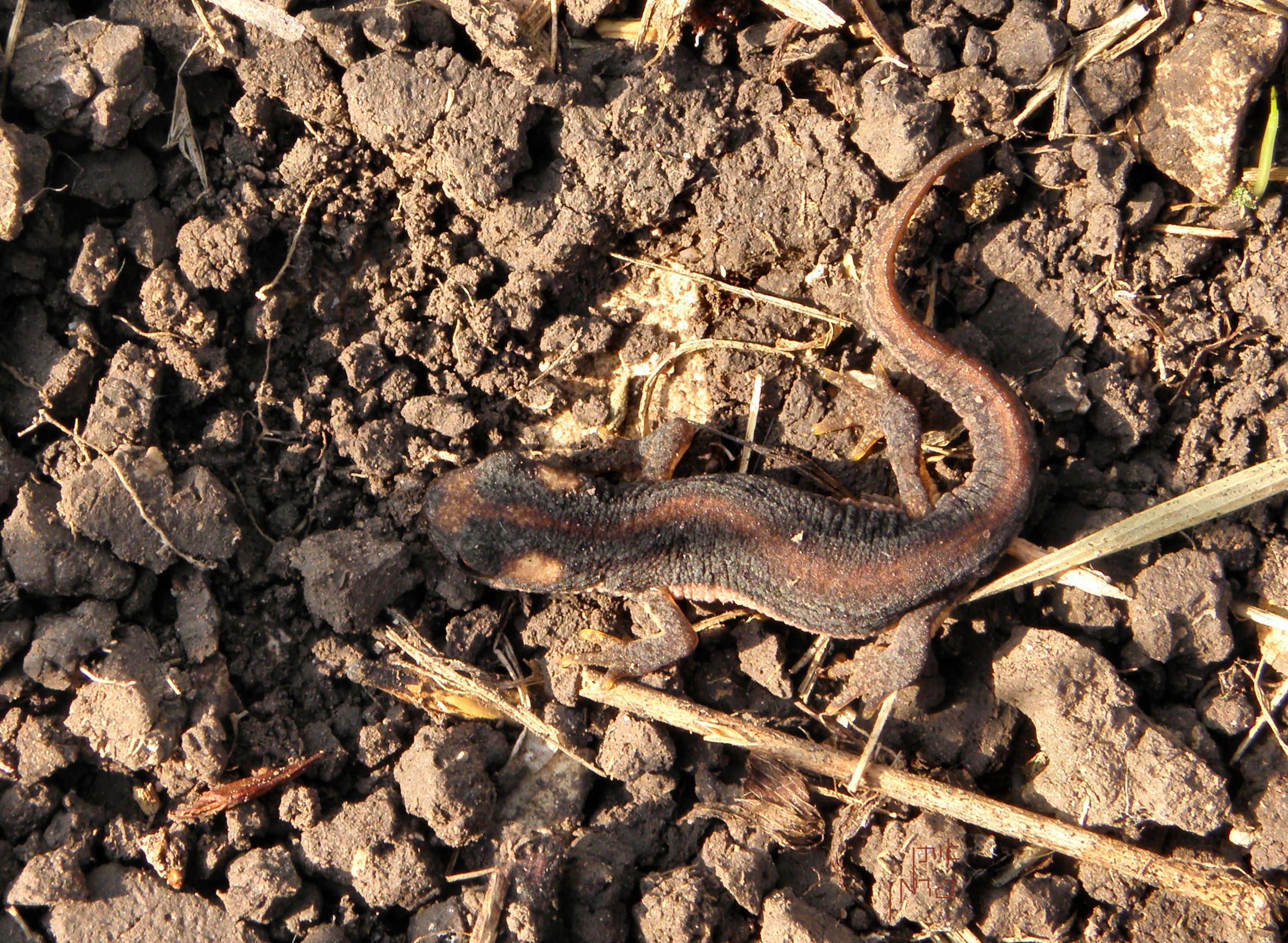

Conservation status
- Least Concern (IUCN 3.1)

Scientific classification
- Kingdom: Animalia
- Phylum: Chordata
- Class: Amphibia
- Order: Urodela
- Family: Salamandridae
- Genus: Ommatotriton
- Species: O. vittatus

Binomial name
- Ommatotriton vittatus Gray, 1835

Synonyms
- Triturus ophzticus Berthold, 1846; Triturus vittatus Molge vittata

= Southern banded newt =

Species of salamander

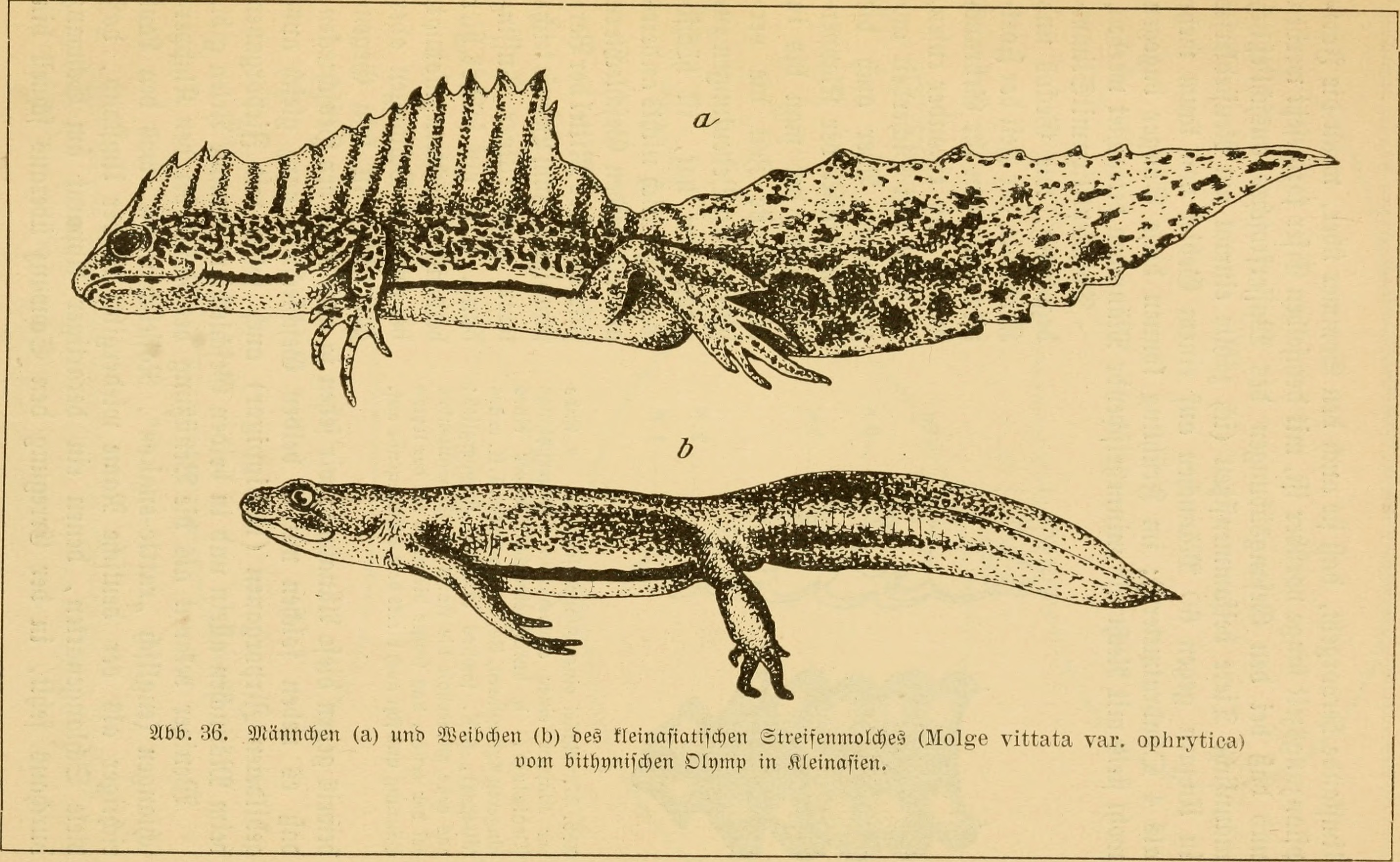
1909 illustration of a male and a female of the species.

The southern banded newt (Ommatotriton vittatus) is a species of salamander in the family Salamandridae found in Armenia (Lori Province of northern Armenia), Iraq, Israel, Jordan, Lebanon, Syria, and Turkey. This species has two subspecies - O. v. vittatus (found in Turkey, Syria, and Israel) and O. v. ciliensis (found in Turkey).

The southern banded newt is a medium-sized newt of 90–110 mm total body length. Females are often slightly smaller than males and have about half their weight but both males and females have a similar mean body condition index.

== Habitat ==
The natural habitat of the species is water bodies of various types in temperate forests and grasslands, including rivers, ponds, and canals, and extending to water in caves, arable land and rural gardens. It has been found in water that has a temperature from 8.7 to 14.6 °C (average 11.4), a pH from 7.5 to 8, a GH (general hardness) from 3-18 (average 11.4), and a KH (carbonate hardness) from 3-18 (average 10.4). Generally they prefer higher altitudes (above 1500m) which have lower temperatures. When temperatures fall below 3.9 °C, they will go into hibernation and aestivating in dry, hot weather.

== Ecology ==
Their breeding season lasts from early spring to early summer (February to June). During this breeding season they inhabit shallow, slow flowing water with vegetation but otherwise inhabit wooded or areas of loose stones that are close to water. Also during this season, O. vittatus males develop large crests on their back and more vivid colors to attract the females along with using visual displays and movements with their tails and crests. The males are known to have aggressive and territorial behavior; they defend their territories by biting and chasing away other males and maintain a few tens of centimeters to 0.8 m of open space between their territories. Fertilization is internal but non-copulatory and the female will often accept multiple spermatophores (from different males).
