= Annie Zuiderwijk =

Dutch herpetologist (1943–2020)

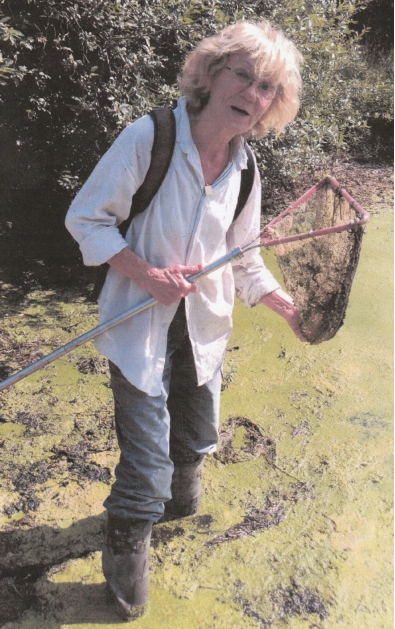
- Born: 22 May 1943
- Died: 27 January 2020 (aged 76)
- Occupation: Herpetologist
- Known for: Atlas of the Netherlands Amphibians and Reptiles

Annie Zuiderwijk (1943–2020) was a Dutch herpetologist who was described as "an indispensable figure in the Dutch herpetological community." She was instrumental in the creation of reptile and amphibian monitoring networks and first became widely known for co-authoring the national herpetological atlas in 1986. She received the Lenders Award in 2010 for her "commitment to the science of herpetology, and for the stimulating role she played in herpetological research in the Netherlands."

== Biography ==
Zuiderwijk was born on 22 May 1943, and worked at the Institute of Taxonomic Zoology, University of Amsterdam.

Zuiderwijk was the responsible administrator of the Herpetogeographical Service (HGD) when she co-authored with Wim Bergmans the Atlas of Dutch Amphibians and Reptiles and their Threat. The Atlas came to be considered the "crowning achievement of the HGD's work."

From 1989 onwards, HGD newsletters, which she authored, appeared in the newsletter of Lacerta (Dutch Society for Herpetology and Terrarium Science, founded in 1942). A year later, the Reptile Monitoring project revealed that many Lacerta members had become the first monitors. In 1992, an entire issue of Lacerta was filled with a single article about Dutch lizards. Zuiderwijk was named an honorary member of Lacerta on 24 April 2004.

When she won the Lenders Award in 2010, it was noted that "through her deep involvement in all her activities, she helped lay the foundation for the study and protection of native reptiles and amphibians."

An interview of Zuiderwijk was published by Van Diepenbeek in the journal RAVON in 2011. During the discussion, Zuiderwijk confirms her collaboration with Lacerta members who had asked to breed and release Sand Lizards following the burning and destruction of a significant portion of the North Holland dunes. Zuiderwijk suggested that they begin with monitoring before releasing the lizards. Later, monitoring of the Grass Snake followed in and around Amsterdam, and in Friesland and the Veluwe.

== Later years ==
Zuiderwijk retired in 2008 from the research staff at the Zoological Museum, University of Amsterdam, in 2008. The lingering effects of Lyme disease, which she had contracted in her younger years, had sapped her energy levels, requiring her to take on reduced roles. Still, after 37 years, she returned to re-examine the relationship between terrestrial habitat development and amphibian occurrence.

After her retirement, she enjoyed her freedom immensely and became a volunteer and took a photography course. She still attended European herpetological conferences and began field research with a student in Ambleteuse, France.

Annie Zuiderwijk developed dementia and cancer and died at 76 on 27 January 2020. An obituary quoted her saying: “I enjoyed life to the fullest."

== Taxon named ==
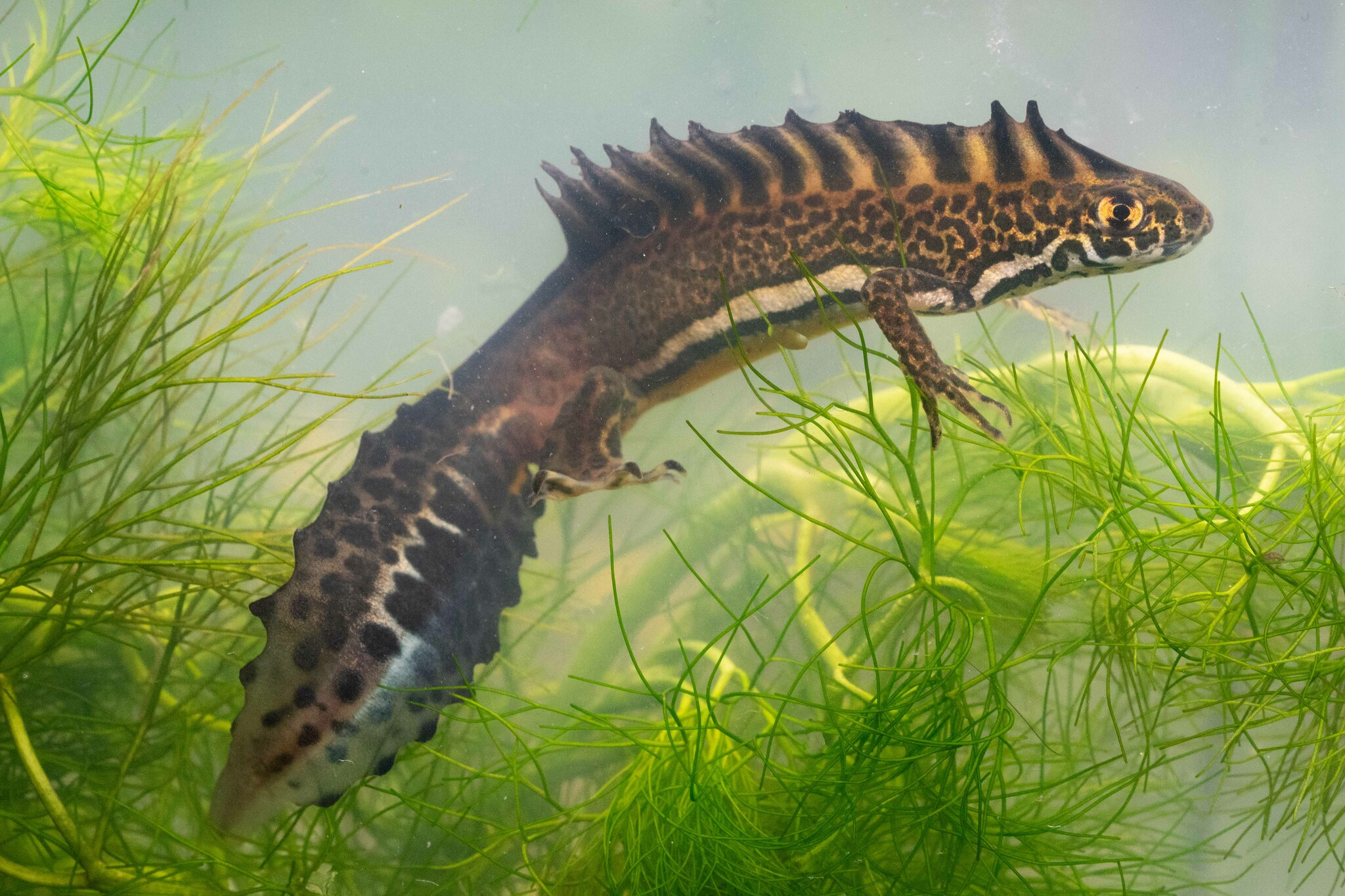
Anatolian Banded Newt

Taxon authored by Zuiderwijk: Ommatotriton nesterovi, the Anatolian Banded Newt.

== Selected works ==
- Schoorl, Jaap, and Annie Zuiderwijk. "Ecological isolation in Triturus cristatus and Triturus marmoratus (Amphibia: Salamandridae)." Amphibia-Reptilia 1, no. 3 (1980): 235-252.
- Zuiderwijk, Annie, and Max Sparreboom. "Territorial behaviour in crested newt Triturus cristatus and marbled newt T. marmoratus (Amphibia, Urodela)." Bijdragen tot de Dierkunde 56, no. 2 (1986): 205-213.
- Bergmans, Wim, and Annie Zuiderwijk. "Atlas van de Nederlandse amfibieën en reptielen en hun bedreiging: vijfde herpetogeografisch verslag." Koninklijke Nederlandse Natuurhistorische Vereniging, 1986.
- Stumpel, A.H.P. (1987). Wim Bergmans, Annie Zuiderwijk: Atlas of the Netherlands Amphibians and Reptiles and their Threats; Fifth Herpetogeographical Report. In Dutch with English summaries. Published by 'Koninklijke Nederlandse Natuurhistorische Vereniging' (K.N.N.V.), Hoogwoud (NL); and by 'Nederlandse Verenig-. Amphibia-Reptilia, 8(4), 425-426. https://doi.org/10.1163/156853887X00216
- Zuiderwijk, Annie. "Sexual strategies in the newts Triturus cristatus and Triturus marmoratus." Bijdragen tot de Dierkunde 60, no. 1 (1990): 51-64.
- van Strien, Arco, Annie Zuiderwijk, Ben Daemen, Ingo Janssen, and Marcel Straver. "Adder en Levendbarende hagedis hebben last van versnippering en verdroging." De Levende Natuur 108, no. 2 (2007): 44-48.
- Arntzen, Jan W., Carlos Abrahams, Willem RM Meilink, Ruben Iosif, and Annie Zuiderwijk. "Amphibian decline, pond loss and reduced population connectivity under agricultural intensification over a 38-year period." Biodiversity and Conservation 26, no. 6 (2017): 1411-1430.
