= Chromosome No. 1 syndrome =

Genetic defect observed in embryos of newts from the genus Triturus

Chromosome No. 1 Syndrome is a genetic defect observed in embryos of newts from the genus Triturus. Approximately half of the eggs laid fail to develop, as their growth halts at a certain stage, leading to the death of the embryos. Surviving embryos always possess two distinct forms of chromosome 1, differing in length. However, having two short forms or two long forms invariably results in embryo death.

This phenomenon is explained by a past chromosomal translocation between what were once identical chromosomes in pair 1, or by these chromosomes historically functioning as sex chromosomes.

== Development of newt embryos ==
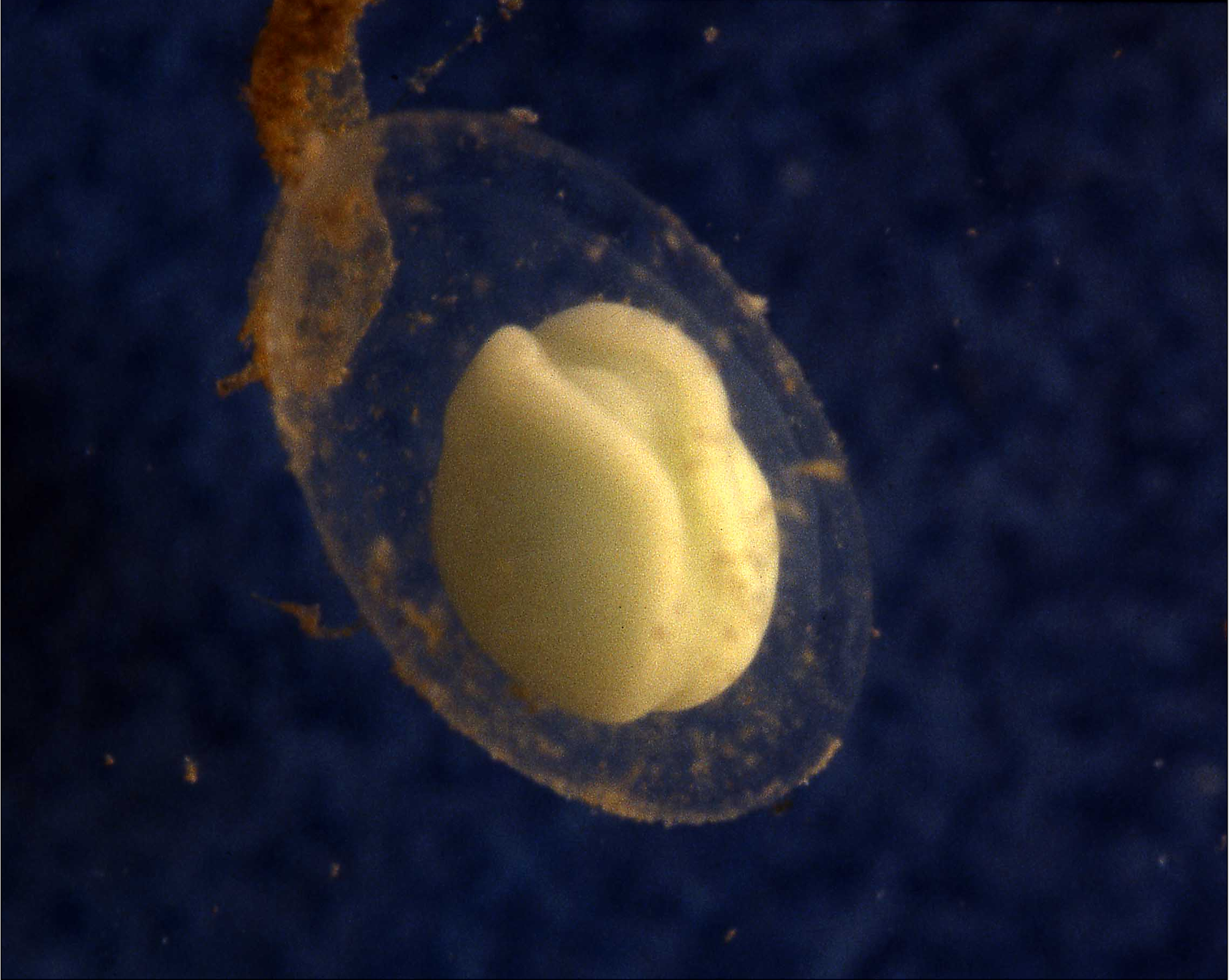
In the egg of the marbled newt (Triturus marmoratus), the neurula phase begins

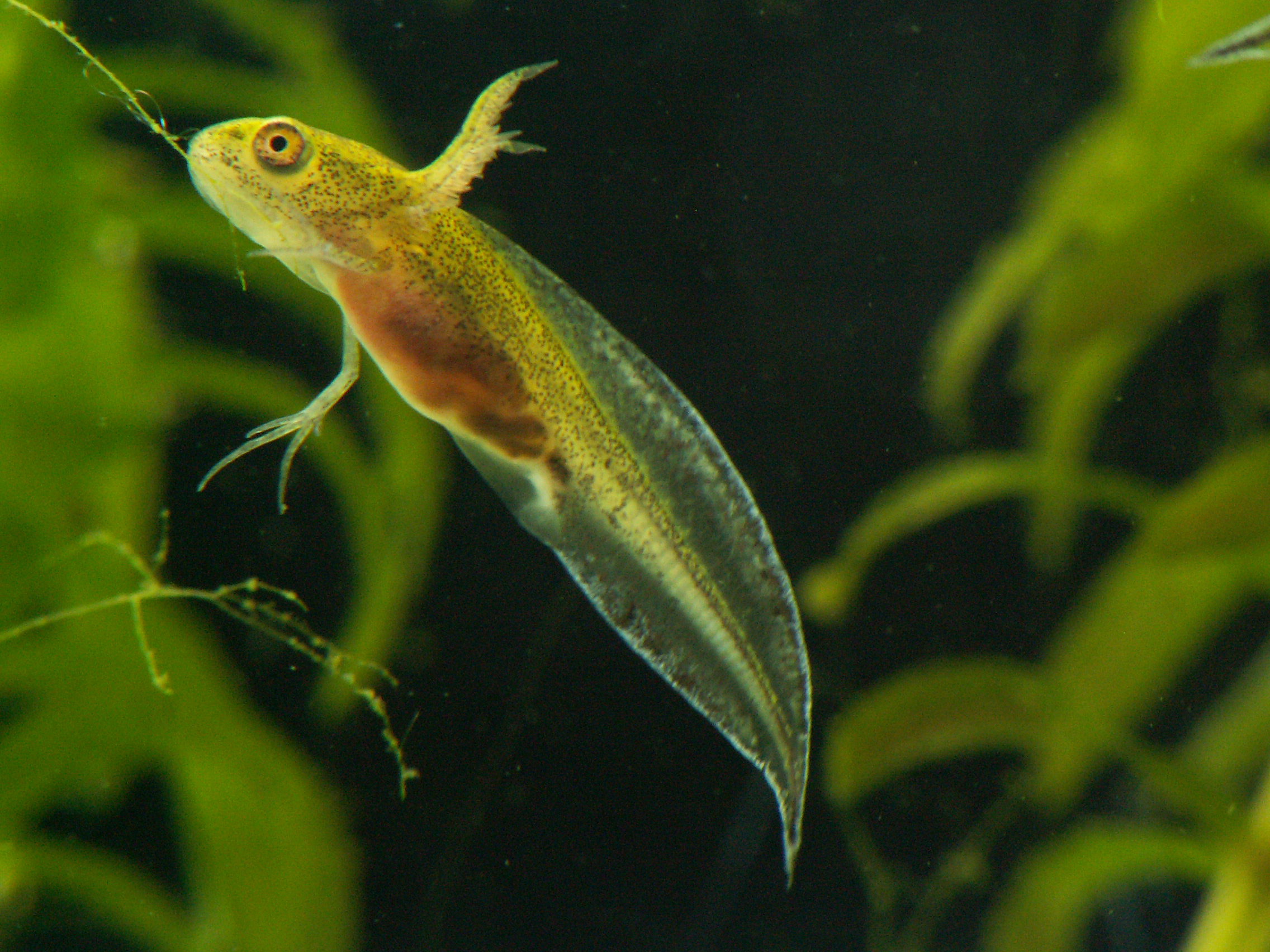
Proper development into a larva, as observed in the northern crested newt (Triturus cristatus)

Newt development, as described by Manuela D'Amen's team using the Triturus carnifex complex as a model, starts with the division of the egg. This is followed by the gastrulation phase, which then leads to the formation of the nervous system. Subsequently, the process progresses through two stages of organogenesis. The first is known as the tailbud stage, while the second is the larval period. Alternatively, the development can be divided into 42 stages. Up to stages 21–22, the development of embryos across different newt species follows a similar pattern. However, differences become apparent during the tailbud and larval stages.

Approximately one-quarter of T. carnifex eggs fail to reach the blastula stage and do not hatch.

== Developmental arrest in newts ==
It has been observed that about half (from 38% to 62%) of Triturus carnifex larvae stop growing at the end of the tailbud stage (stages 26–30), resulting in their death. A similar effect was noted by Stanley Sessions and others in the northern crested and marbled newts, with the latter experiencing this earlier than the two species mentioned before. This phenomenon also occurs in Triturus dobrogicus and Triturus karelinii. The death happens after several days of development. No such developmental disruptions are observed in other newt species. D'Amen's team showed that this process in T. carnifex is independent of both temperature and water pH.

Embryos that stop developing do not form a homogeneous group, but instead consist of two distinct phenotypes, which occur with similar frequency. One of them, until the point of developmental arrest, is morphologically indistinguishable from normally developing embryos, up until stages 25–27, after which the growth rate slows down. This type is referred to as phenotype A or ST (slim-tailed).

The second phenotype shows abnormalities even during the transition from gastrula to neurula. It is characterized by a protruding yolk plug and delayed head development, including the eyes, gills, mouth, and balance organ. Dorsal swelling appears, first observed by D'Amen. The tail region becomes swollen, and the notochord may be disrupted. D'Amen named this phenotype B, while Sessions' team called it FT (fat-tailed).

These groups also differ in the quality of the flexion response. It proceeds normally in ST of the northern crested newts and T. carnifex, but it does not occur in ST of marbled newts or in FT forms of these species.

A common feature of both phenotypes is abnormal tail rounding development. In both groups, heart development is disrupted: although it appears morphologically normal, it sometimes does not beat at all, and in other cases, it beats weakly. The abnormalities are more pronounced in FT individuals. Additionally, after developmental arrest, regardless of the phenotype, the larvae survive for several more days. During this time, their bodies undergo slight changes. However, cells die, and tissues degenerate. Blisters form, some of which burst. The surrounding egg membrane loses its transparency and integrity, eventually releasing the embryo.

== Etiology and genetics ==
The developmental disorder described is related to features of chromosome 1, the longest chromosome in the newt karyotype, which has a characteristic large region of heterochromatin on its long arm containing ribosomal and satellite DNA. In the genus Triturus, this chromosome shows heteromorphism, visible through Giemsa staining or in the case of lampbrush chromosomes. There are two distinct forms of chromosome 1, named 1A and 1B, and this difference affects the long arm of the chromosome. The variation is most strongly expressed in the marbled newt. Callan and Lloyd first observed and described it in 1960 in the northern crested newt and later in the marbled newt. It was not found in the alpine newt (Ichthyosaura alpestris).

Chromosome 1B is identified by two dark C-bands in the distal region of the lighter euchromatin at the end of the chromosome, visible in Giemsa staining. Chromosome 1A does not carry the characteristic bands of 1B, and if similar bands appear, they are located differently.

=== Hypothesis of chromosomal translocation ===
In the past, in the most recent common ancestor of Triturus, a chromosomal translocation occurred between the two chromosomes of the first pair during mitosis in the germline cells. A portion of one chromosome was transferred to its homolog, and vice versa. As a result, two chromosomes were formed, with part of the genetic material being deleted and part duplicated. Chromosome 1A has a large duplication of regions labeled 6–8, accompanied by a small deletion of region 3. In contrast, chromosome 1B has a large deletion of regions 6–8 with a duplication of a small region 3 (such deletions in a monozygotic state would be lethal). In the form of lampbrush chromosomes, they create a different number of loops. The differences between chromosomes 1A and 1B are primarily in the described heterochromatin region, and are more pronounced in the marble newt (23%, while in T. karelinii it is 7%), which is linked to the earlier developmental arrest in this species. Furthermore, the pair of chromosomes with a larger deletion (1B1B) is associated with a more disturbed FT phenotype.

The differences between the forms are linked to the inability to form chiasmata between the chromosomes. 1A and 1B do not pair during the chromosomal crossover. This allowed for the accumulation of additional changes in the examined heterochromatin region. As a result, this chromosome grew, making it the largest in the Triturus karyotype, although it contains roughly the same amount of euchromatin as the small chromosomes of the newts.

Therefore, if, as postulated by Sessions, the translocation occurred in the early mitosis of germline cells, the defect was passed on to numerous gametes produced by this individual. Crossing with a normal individual resulted in the creation of hybrids containing chromosome 1 and either 1A or 1B. They must have survived. By crossing among themselves, they would produce offspring in which, for the first time, individuals with 1A1A, 1A1B, and 1B1B combinations would appear.

In all adult individuals, heteromorphism of this chromosome is present; they always have chromosomes 1A1B, indicating that the existence of two forms is a necessary condition for development. The presence of both chromosomes is essential because they contain different elements of the original chromosome 1.

All homomorphic embryos of Triturus regarding the short or long form of chromosome 1 die. The two groups of embryos with developmental arrest described above have either two short or two long copies of chromosome 1. It turns out that embryos with the 1B1B genotype have more defects (FT form), while 1A1A forms the ST population.

The hypothesis of Sessions is supported by the viability of Triturus hybrids with related newt species, whose gametes supply missing chromosome regions to the zygotes. Triploid hybrids of the marble and northern crested newts (such crosses also occur in nature, but in this case, individuals are formed as if from crosses of newts of the same species) also survive and thrive. This confirms that the cause of developmental arrest is not the presence of excess genetic material, but its deficiency.

A similar disorder has been observed in axolotl mutants (c and p). By analogy with the axolotl mutation p, it is suggested that the disorder causing developmental arrest in newts may be due to abnormal development of the endoderm. Its improper distribution in FT may be related to faulty closure of the blastopore and defective epiboly. The first factor particularly affects the endoderm of the yolk sac, which then interacts abnormally with adjacent cells, causing swelling in the tail area. However, epiboly in ST proceeds normally, and the disorders in the central nervous system in both groups indicate broader abnormalities not limited to the endoderm.

=== Sex chromosomes ===
Wallace proposed that chromosome pair 1 was associated with sex-determination system, creating a system of 1A1A/1A1B (comparable to the XX/XY system in humans). Individuals with the 1B1B genotype would be lethal. This idea was rejected because adult newts of both sexes have the 1A1B genotype. It was also unclear how a homogametic 1A1A sex chromosome would transform into a lethal form. It has since been excluded that chromosome 1 is currently involved in sex determination; in newts, a different chromosome pair (number 4) is responsible for sex determination. However, Christine Grossen's team proposes a different solution: they argue that the presence of non-pairing autosomes is not possible, and thus pair 1 must have served as sex chromosomes in the past, with pair 4 later taking over this role. They note that non-pairing regions and significant size differences between chromosomes are typical of sex chromosomes. To avoid the difficulties in Wallace's model, Grossen had to create a completely different one.

They proposed that the function of the mammalian Y chromosome was originally carried by both 1A and 1B. They justified this by pointing out that non-recombining Y chromosomes naturally accumulate mutations, and that different haplotypes of Y occur in different populations. They further noted that in some species, YY individuals can be viable, suggesting recessive mutations accumulated in each haplotype. Finally, they mentioned the role of temperature in sex determination in some vertebrates. Higher temperatures masculinize the northern crested newt, while lower temperatures feminize it. Based on these facts, Grossen proposes the following scenario: in the original population, there were 2 haplotypes, labeled Y_{A} and Y_{B}, each carrying different recessive lethal mutations. Then, due to climatic changes or an expansion of their range northward, the populations were exposed to cooler temperatures, which promoted the development of more females, including those with genotypes XY_{A} and XY_{B}. These females would mate with males of the same genotype. Crosses between XY_{A} and XY_{B} would produce, among others, the genotypes Y_{A}Y_{A} and Y_{B}Y_{B}. Both chromosomes would carry the same lethal mutation, leading to embryo death. In contrast, in the Y_{A}Y_{B} system, the chromosomes would carry different recessive lethal mutations. Such an organism would develop normally. However, the fact that females were more frequent in such a population would reinforce the selection for mutations favoring masculinization. This mutation could have appeared on chromosome 4, forming a new pair of sex chromosomes.

== Significance in classification ==
This trait has been recognized as one of the synapomorphies of the genus Triturus in its new understanding, referring to the phylogenetic line of the northern crested newt. This includes the species Triturus carnifex, Triturus karelinii, Triturus dobrogicus, Triturus marmoratus, and Triturus pygmaeus. Previously, these species were classified under the subgenus Neotriton within the genus Triturus. It included the group of northern crested newts and the group of marbled newts. The presence of the same genetic defect is considered evidence of their close relationship – they together form a single monophyletic developmental line. This view has been supported by electrophoresis studies.

== Evolution of newts ==
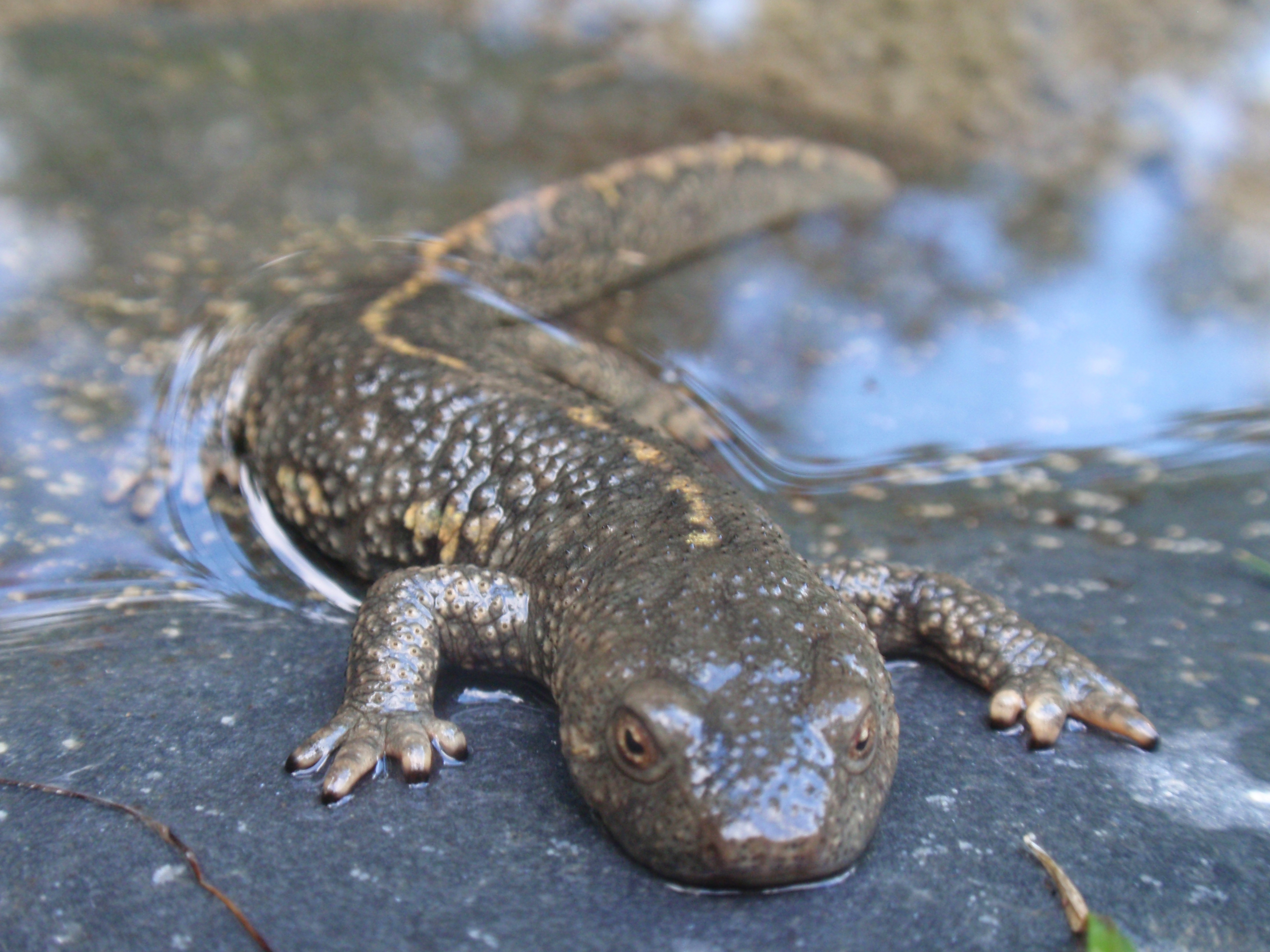
In the cladogram by Wielstra and Arntzen, the outgroup is the genus Calotriton (above, the Pyrenean brook salamander, C. asper), in which the described developmental arrest does not occur

This situation suggests that in the past, the ancestor of modern newts, which are affected by the defect, underwent unequal genetic material exchange between the two copies of chromosome 1. This line diverged between 12 and 10 million years ago. Sessions emphasizes its significant role in the evolution of the genus Triturus in its old understanding. A line was formed in which half of the offspring were unable to develop. Despite this, the genetic defect somehow became established, despite competition from other newts. This would lead to a decrease in fitness, expressed for 1A by the formula 1-p and for 1B by 1-q, where p and q represent frequencies in the gametes. For this to happen, the defect must have arisen in a population with a small effective size, where heterozygotes predominated. It could not be eliminated by intra-species selection because the defect affected all reproducing individuals equally. Perhaps the harmful effect of half of the eggs dying was balanced by the larger size of Triturus compared to other newts, which was associated with a higher number of eggs produced. In the marbled newt line, additional mutations occurred, expanding the heterochromatin area. Then, 10.4 million years ago, the T. karelinii line separated. T. carnifex and T. macedonicus diverged 9.3 million years ago, and the northern crested newt and T. dobrogicus diverged 8.8 million years ago.
