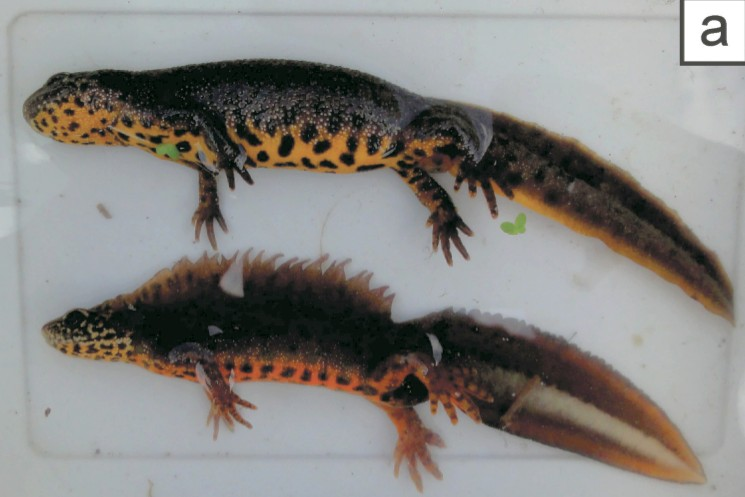
- Female (above) and male (below)

Conservation status
- Least Concern (IUCN 3.1)

Scientific classification
- Kingdom: Animalia
- Phylum: Chordata
- Class: Amphibia
- Order: Urodela
- Family: Salamandridae
- Genus: Triturus
- Species: T. anatolicus

Binomial name
- Triturus anatolicus Wielstra & Arntzen 2016

= Anatolian crested newt =

Species of amphibian

The Anatolian crested newt (Triturus anatolicus) is a species of newt endemic to northern Anatolia in Turkey. Before its description in 2016, it was initially considered to belong to the southern crested newt (Triturus karelinii) and then the Balkan crested newt (Triturus ivanbureschi). The three species form a complex of morphologically indistinguishable cryptic species. Genetic data demonstrated the Anatolian crested newt to be distinct from the other two species, although it hybridises with the Balkan crested newt at its western range end.

With its two closely related species, the Anatolian crested newt is more stockily built than the other crested newts, and reaches 10–13 cm in length. It is semiaquatic, spending most of the year on land and only returning to water for breeding. The species does not seem to be immediately threatened.

== Systematics and taxonomy ==
The Anatolian crested newt was described by Ben Wielstra and Jan Willem Arntzen in 2016. Mitochondrial DNA data had already suggested that it was a separate species in a 2013 study, but the authors had preferred to await a more detailed analysis before formal species description and temporarily included it in the Balkan crested newt (Triturus ivanbureschi), which had been split from the southern crested newt (T. karelinii). Nuclear DNA analysis then confirmed that its populations form a distinct gene pool, although it detected a hybrid zone where the species' range borders that of its sister species, the Balkan crested newt, in western Anatolia.

- Triturus
  - marbled newts
    - T. marmoratus
    - T. pygmaeus
  - crested newts
    - - T. karelinii
      - - Triturus anatolicus
        - T. ivanbureschi
    - - - T. carnifex
        - T. macedonicus
      - - T. cristatus
        - T. dobrogicus

Position of the Anatolian crested newt in the phylogenetic tree of genus Triturus, as suggested by analysis of complete mitochondrial DNA.

== Description ==
No morphological criteria are known to distinguish the Anatolian crested newt from the Balkan and the southern crested newt; the three are cryptic species. Like the other two closely related species, it is a rather stout newt which measures 10 to 13 centimetres (3.9 to 5.1 in) and has 12–13 rib-bearing vertebrae. Its back and sides are brown–black with darker spots; the underside is orange with black blotches whose pattern is variable among individuals. Females do not develop a crest and swollen cloaca, and have a smaller tail fin during the aquatic phase.

== Distribution and habitats ==
The species is endemic to northern Anatolia on the Black Sea coast, where its range extends roughly from the Bosphorus and Bursa in the west to Trabzon in the east, reaching no more than 200 kilometres (120 mi) inland.

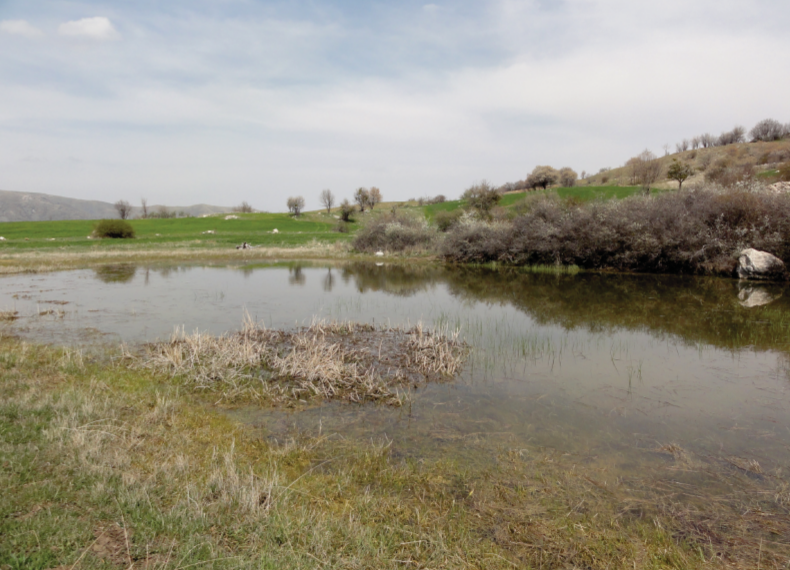
Breeding pond at the type locality near Gölköy.

== Behaviour and ecology ==
Like other Triturus species, the Anatolian crested newt initially develops in the water, but spends most of the year in shady habitats on land as an adult. It returns to breeding ponds every year, where males develop a conspicuous dorsal crests and court the females. Eggs are folded in leaves of water plants.

== Threats and conservation ==
It is thought to have a large population and wide distribution and as such is listed as least concern. Ongoing urbanization and intensification of land use is reducing the quality of its habitat and breeding ponds. Some of its historical habitats have now been converted to fruit gardens and vegetable fields, and it is unknown whether the species is persisting there. Small-scale agriculture is therefore considered a threat.

All crested newts are listed in the Bern Convention (appendix II) and the EU Habitats Directive (annex II and IV), which prohibit capture, disturbance, killing, trade, and destruction of habitats.

This species was discovered in an agricultural irrigation pond in January 2024.
