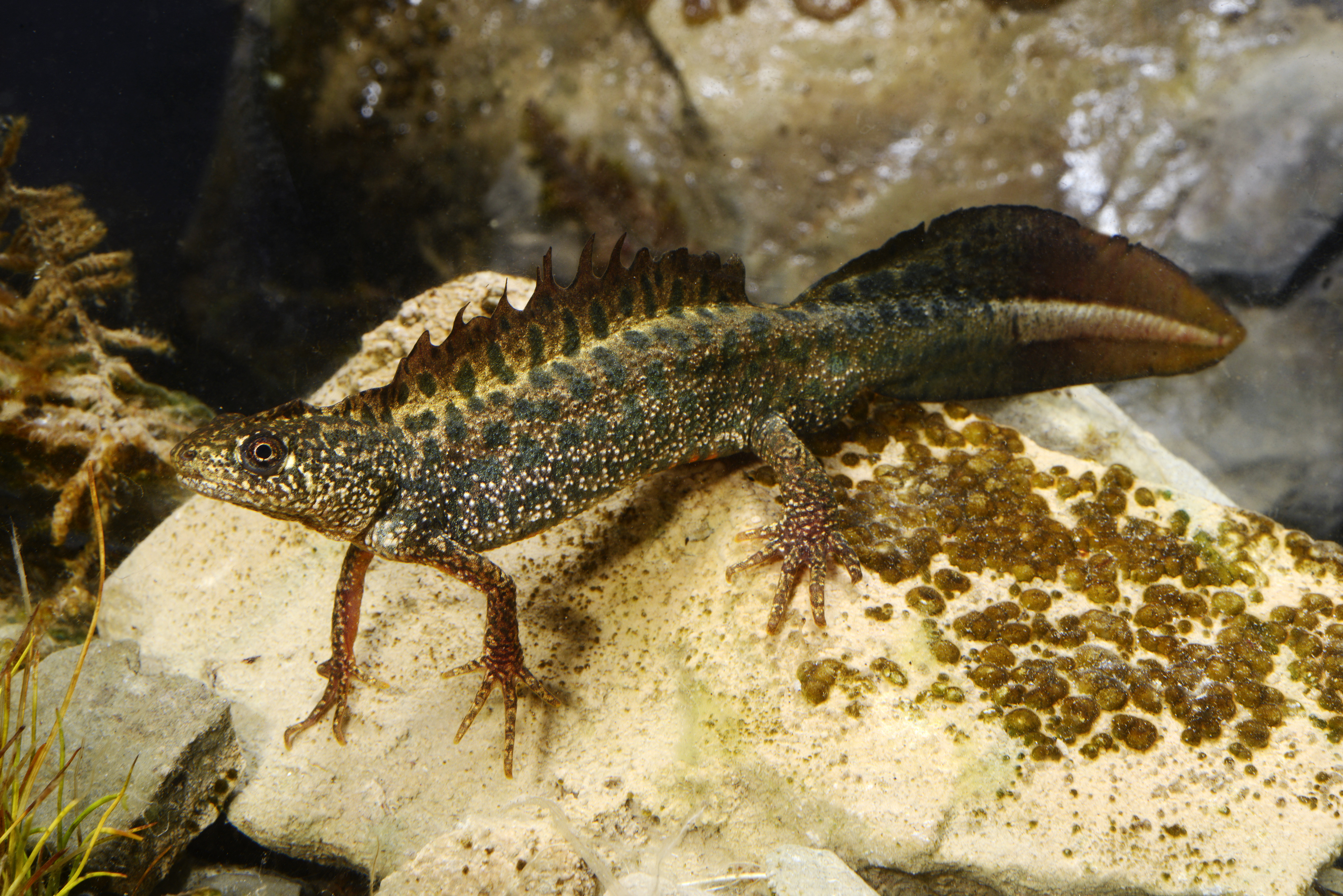
- male in "mating dress"

Conservation status
- Vulnerable (IUCN 3.1)

Scientific classification
- Kingdom: Animalia
- Phylum: Chordata
- Class: Amphibia
- Order: Urodela
- Family: Salamandridae
- Genus: Triturus
- Species: T. macedonicus

Binomial name
- Triturus macedonicus (Karaman, 1922)

Synonyms
- Molge karelinii var. macedonica Karaman, 1922; Triturus carnifex macedonicus Arntzen and Wallis, 1999; Triturus (Triturus) macedonicus Dubois and Raffaëlli, 2009; Triturus cristatus carnifex var. albanicus Dely, 1959; Triturus karelinii arntzeni Litvinchuk, Borkin, Džukić and Kalezić 1999; Triturus (Triturus) karelinii arntzeni Dubois and Raffaëlli, 2009; Triturus arntzeni Espregueira Themudo, Wielstra, and Arntzen, 2009

= Triturus macedonicus =

Species of amphibian

Triturus macedonicus, the Macedonian crested newt, is a newt species of the crested newt species complex in genus Triturus, found in the Western Balkan peninsula (Bosnia-Herzegovina, Albania, Montenegro, North Macedonia, north-western Greece and south-western Bulgaria).

To the North, its range borders that of the Danube crested newt and the Northern crested newt and to the East, that of the Balkan crested newt.

It was first described as a variety of Triturus karelinii, later considered a subspecies of Triturus carnifex, and was elevated to species rank following molecular phylogenetic analysis in 2007.

Triturus arntzeni was considered a synonym of T. macedonicus, but this name applies in fact to a hybrid between this species and the Balkan-Anatolian crested newt (T. ivanbureschi), and thus is a synonym of both species.

Paedomorphosis in T.macedonicus is rare, but it does occur, as inticated by two surveys in Montenegro and Greece.
