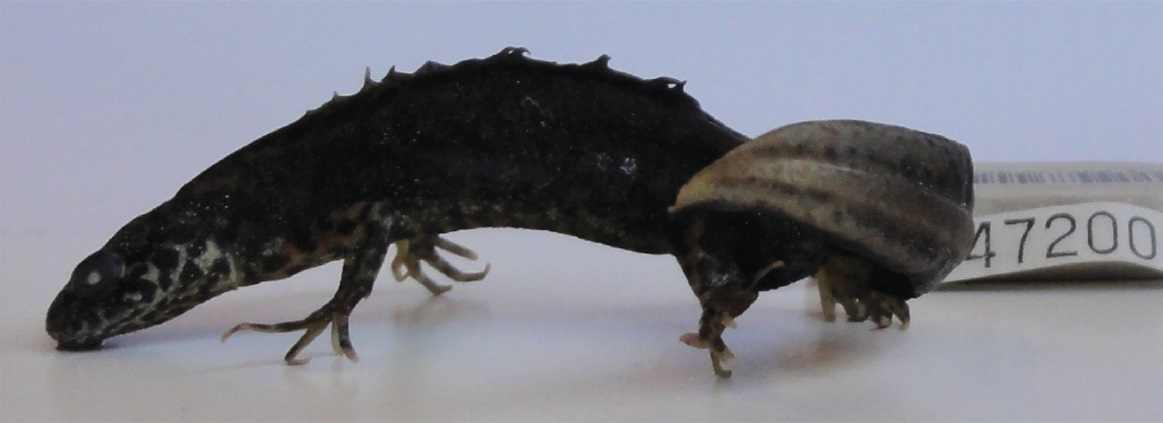
- Museum specimen

Conservation status
- Least Concern (IUCN 3.1)

Scientific classification
- Kingdom: Animalia
- Phylum: Chordata
- Class: Amphibia
- Order: Urodela
- Family: Salamandridae
- Genus: Triturus
- Species: T. ivanbureschi

Binomial name
- Triturus ivanbureschi Arntzen & Wielstra, 2013

Synonyms
- Triton cristatus karelinii forma bureschi Wolterstorff, 1925; Triton cristatus karelini forma byzanthina Wolterstorff, 1923; Triturus karelinii arntzeni Litvinchuk, Borkin, Džukić and Kalezić 1999; Triturus (Triturus) karelinii arntzeni Dubois and Raffaëlli, 2009; Triturus arntzeni Espregueira Themudo, Wielstra, and Arntzen, 2009

= Balkan crested newt =

Species of amphibian

The Balkan crested newt or Buresch's crested newt (Triturus ivanbureschi) is a newt species of the crested newt species complex in genus Triturus, found in Southeastern Europe and Anatolia.

It was originally described as a subspecies of the southern crested newt, "Triturus karelinii arntzeni", in 1999, and later considered a full species when genetic data showed it to be distinct. After it was suggested the type specimen of "T. arntzeni" belonged in fact to the Macedonian crested newt (T. macedonicus), the species was redescribed, with a new type specimen, as T. ivanbureschi in 2013. The species epithet was chosen in honour of Bulgarian herpetologist Ivan Buresh.

Its distribution ranges from the Southeastern Balkan peninsula (Western North Macedonia, Northwestern Greece, Bulgaria, Eastern Thrace) to Western Anatolia. An isolated population, surrounded by other crested newt species, occurs in Serbia. Genetic data showed that Northern Anatolian populations east of the Bosphorus and Bursa form a separate, but morphologically indistinguishable sibling species, which was described as Anatolian crested newt (T. anatolicus) in 2016.

The Balkan crested newt hybridises with the Anatolian crested newt at its eastern range end. At the western and northern borders, it hybridises with the Macedonian crested newt, the Danube crested newt (T. dobrogicus), and the northern crested newt (T. cristatus). The type specimen of "T. arntzeni" is in fact a hybrid between the Balkan and the Macedonian crested newt, so that this name is a synonym for both species.
