= Yolk plug =

Yolk plug is the remaining patch of endodermal cells that is created during the formation of the dorsal lip of the blastopore in the amphibian. It is a patch of large endodermal cells which remains exposed on the vegetal surface of the blastula that will eventually be internalized by epiboly.
