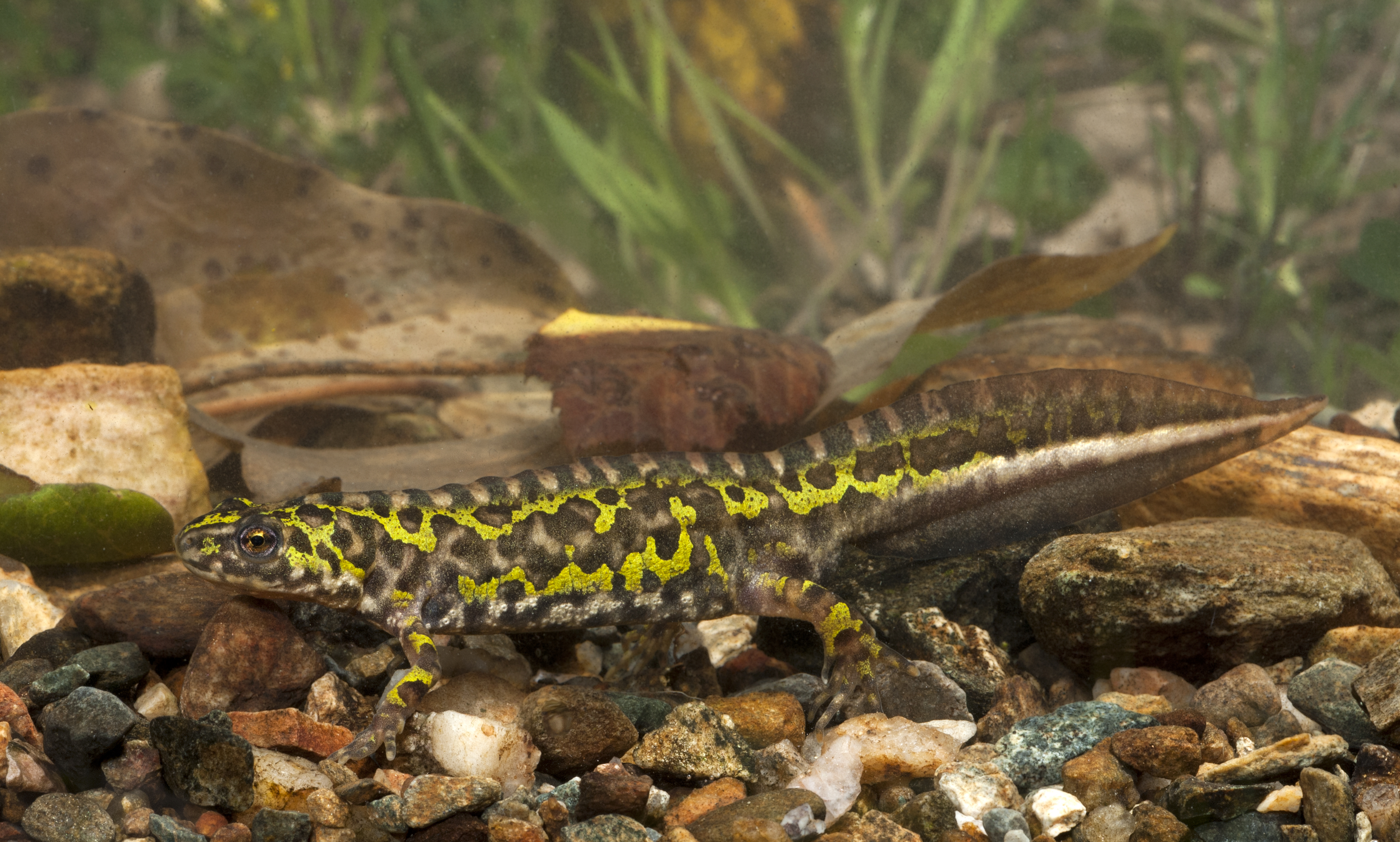

Conservation status
- Near Threatened (IUCN 3.1)

Scientific classification
- Kingdom: Animalia
- Phylum: Chordata
- Class: Amphibia
- Order: Urodela
- Family: Salamandridae
- Genus: Triturus
- Species: T. pygmaeus

Binomial name
- Triturus pygmaeus Wolterstorff, 1905
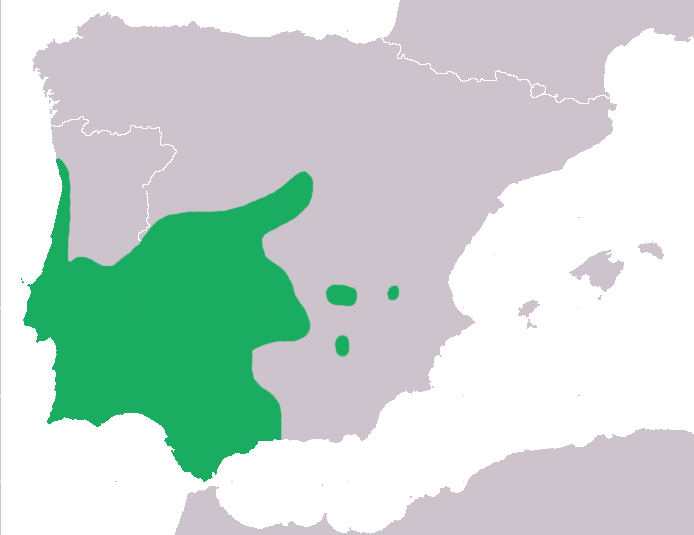

= Southern marbled newt =

Species of salamander

The southern marbled newt or pygmy marbled newt (Triturus pygmaeus) is a species of salamander in the family Salamandridae. It is found in Portugal and Spain. Its natural habitats are temperate forests, Mediterranean-type shrubby vegetation, rivers, intermittent rivers, freshwater marshes, intermittent freshwater marshes, arable land, pastureland, rural gardens, water storage areas, ponds, open excavations, irrigated land, canals and ditches. It is threatened by habitat loss.

Previously thought to be a subspecies of the marbled newt (Triturus marmoratus), it was raised to species level after genetic studies revealed its distinctiveness from the former.

== Distribution ==
The southern marbled newt occurs only in southern Portugal and southwestern Spain, in Mediterranean climate. The Douro–Tagus watershed forms a narrow, northern border to the range of Triturus marmoratus.

== Description ==
The southern marbled newt is similar in appearance to the marbled newt but is smaller, with adults reaching a total length of 13 centimetres (5.1 in) as against the latter's 17 centimetres (6.7 in). The dorsal surface is yellowish-green heavily mottled with irregular patches of dark brown or black, and there is a thin orange line running along the spine from head to tip of tail, although this stripe fades somewhat in adult males. The underparts are creamy-white with dark spots which distinguishes this species from the marbled newt with its dark underparts. Breeding males have a wavy, black-barred crest running from the head tail tip, but this has no indentation between body and tail.

== Status ==
The southern marbled newt lives in oak woodland and uses ponds, ditches and other water bodies for breeding. Its habitat is being degraded by urbanization and the loss of temporary water bodies. Another threat to the species is the introduction of crayfish and non-native fish and the pollution of its breeding sites. As a result, the International Union for Conservation of Nature has assessed its status as being "near threatened".
