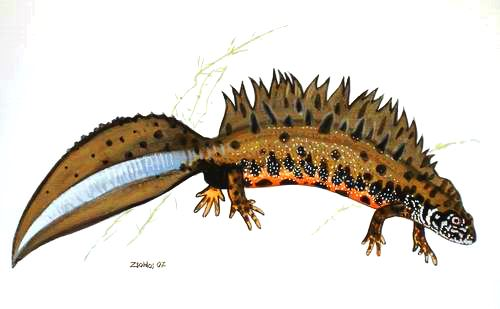

Conservation status
- Least Concern (IUCN 3.1)

Scientific classification
- Kingdom: Animalia
- Phylum: Chordata
- Class: Amphibia
- Order: Urodela
- Family: Salamandridae
- Genus: Triturus
- Species: T. dobrogicus

Binomial name
- Triturus dobrogicus (Kiritzescu, 1903)

Synonyms
- Triton cristatus var. dobrogicus Kiritzescu, 1903; Molge macrosoma Boulenger, 1908; Triton cristatus danubialis Wolterstorff, 1923; Triton cristatus cristatus forma dobrogica Wolterstorff, 1923; Triton cristatus danubialis forma werneri Wolterstorff, 1923; Triturus cristatus danubialis Mertens, 1923; Triton (Neotriton) cristatus danubialis Bolkay, 1928; Triturus cristatus dobrogicus Mertens & Müller, 1928; Molge cristata danubialis forma smederevana Karaman, 1948; Triturus cristatus danubialis var. intermedia Fuhn, 1953; Triturus cristatus dobrogicus Mertens & Wermuth, 1960; Triturus dobrogicus Bucci-Innocenti, Ragghianti & Mancino, 1983; Triturus (Triturus) dobrogicus MacGregor, Sessions & Arntzen, 1990; Triturus dobrogicus dobrogicus Litvinchuk and Borkin, 2000; Triturus dobrogicus macrosomus Litvinchuk and Borkin, 2000; Triturus (Triturus) dobrogicus dobrogicus Dubois & Raffaëlli, 2009; Triturus (Triturus) dobrogicus macrosoma Dubois & Raffaëlli, 2009

= Danube crested newt =

Species of amphibian

The Danube crested newt or Danube newt (Triturus dobrogicus) is a species of newt found in central and eastern Europe, along the basin of the Danube river and some of its tributaries and in the Dnieper delta. It has a smaller and more slender body than the other crested newts in genus Triturus but like these, males develop a conspicuous jagged seam on back and tail during breeding season.

For half of the year or longer, adults live in slow-flowing river margins, lakes, or ponds, where reproduction takes place. Males perform a courtship display, and females lay around 200 eggs individually onto leaves of aquatic plants. Larvae develop two to four months in the water before reaching metamorphosis. For the remainder of the year, the newts live in shady land habitats, usually forests. Although not yet considered threatened, Danube crested newt populations have declined significantly, the reason being mainly habitat loss. The species is protected by law in the European Union.

== Taxonomy ==
The Danube crested newt was described as a variety of the northern crested newt (Triturus cristatus) by C. Kiritzescu in 1903. Later, it was considered a subspecies until genetic analysis supported its recognition as a separate species in the crested newt species complex. The northern crested newt is its sister species, according to phylogenomic studies.

Separated populations from the Danube Delta and the Pannonian Basin (see section Distribution and habitats) were described as two subspecies, T. dobrogicus dobrogicus and T. dobrogicus macrosoma, in 2000. Later genetic study, however, did not support the distinction of these two forms.

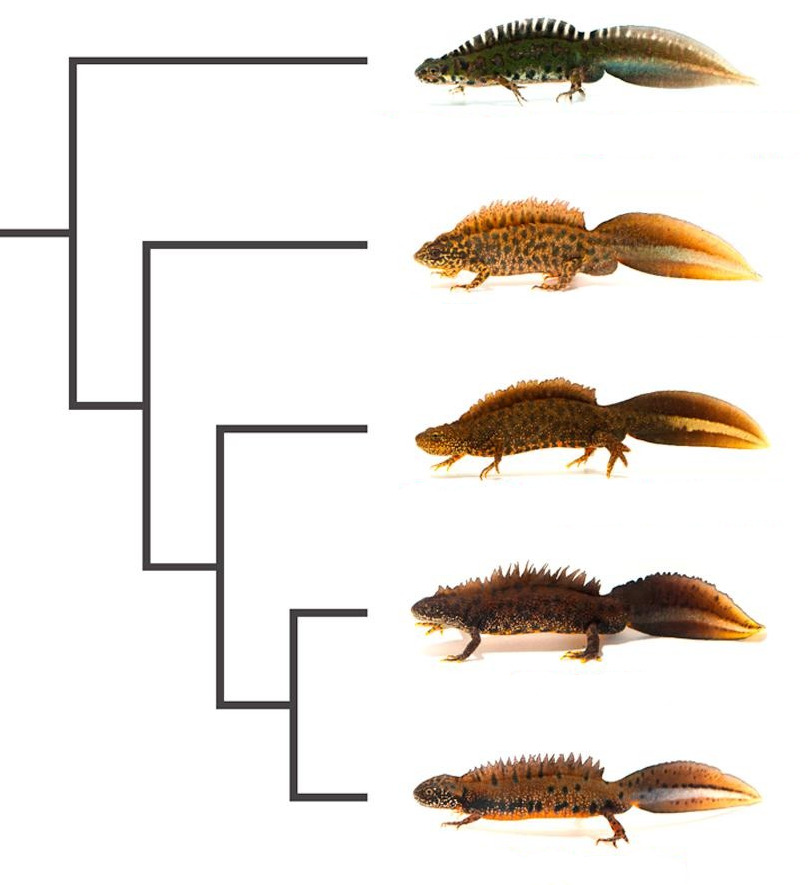
Position of the Danube crested newt (T. dobrogicus) in the phylogenetic tree of the genus Triturus

== Description ==
Measuring 13 to 15 centimetres (5.1 to 5.9 in) long in total, sometimes up to 18 centimetres (7.1 in) in females, the Danube crested newt is the smallest crested newt species. It has a more slender, elongate body than the other species, well adapted to swimming, with a narrow head and relatively short limbs. This body shape has evolved through an increase in the number of rib-bearing vertebrae: there are 16–17 of them in T. dobrogicus, the highest number among the crested newts.

The Danube crested newt's back and sides are dark brown with black spots and white stippling. The belly is orange to red (in other crested newts, it is usually yellow or orange–yellow), with small or medium-sized black blotches that have sharp edges. Like all crested newts, T. dobrogicus males develop a crest on their back and tail during breeding phase, which can be quite high and jagged, usually starts between the eyes and nostrils, and is interrupted at the tail base. Another feature of males at breeding season is a bluish-white stripe along the tail. Females can sometimes have a yellow stripe along the back, similar to the Italian crested newt (T. carnifex).

== Distribution and habitats ==
The Danube crested newt is found in three allopatric areas of distribution from central to eastern Europe:

- Pannonian basin: From easternmost Austria through Czech Republic (small part in the southeast), Slovakia, Hungary, nordeast Slovenia (river Mura backwaters), northern Croatia, Bosnia-Hercegovina (marginally), northern Serbia to the east of Romania and southeast of Ukraine (Transcarpathian region). This includes the middle floodplains of the Danube river and some of its tributaries, including the Drava, Sava and Tisza.
- Lower Danube and Danube delta: Separated from the Pannonian basin by an area where the northern crested newt occurs, this central part ranges from southern Romania, northern Bulgaria, and small parts of southern Moldova to the Odesa region of southern Ukraine.
- Dnieper delta: This small area of distribution in southern Ukraine was reported in 2005. It is now isolated by steppe from the Danube basin, but it has been suggested that these areas were connected through marshlands during the Last Glacial Maximum, when the level of the Black Sea was around 100 metres lower than today. This range may also extend to the lower basins of the Dniester and Bug rivers.

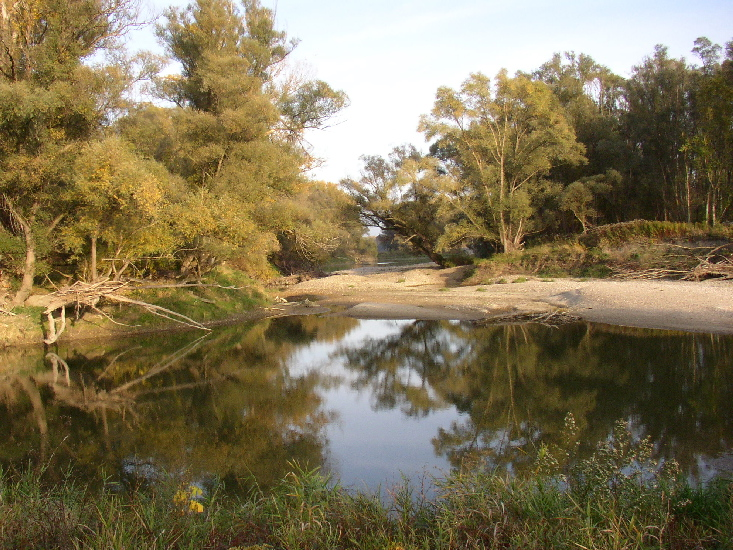
The riparian forests of Danube-Auen National Park in Austria harbour important populations, breeding in a variety of temporarily flooded water bodies.

In addition to the northern crested newt to the north, the Danube crested newt's range borders that of the Italian crested newt (T. carnifex) in the west, and that of the Macedonian (T. macedonicus) and Balkan (T. ivanbureschi) crested newts in the south.

Compared to the other crested newt species, the Danube crested newt is more adapted to life along a river system and frequently occurs in flowing water and together with fish. Typical breeding sites are slow-flowing river margins, oxbow lakes, flooded marshland, larger ponds, or ditches, provided abundant underwater vegetation is available. During land phase, the newts live in deciduous forests or groves, bushlands, or meadows.

== Lifecycle and behaviour ==
Danube crested newts have the longest aquatic phase in the genus Triturus. Adults move to their breeding sites in February or March and usually stay there for six months; occasionally, they may even stay longer or return to the water in autumn. Males court females with a display of ritualised body movements. When they have gained the female's interest, they guide it over a spermatophore they deposit on the ground, which the female then takes up with her cloaca. The eggs are fertilised internally. As in other crested newts, a female lays around 200 eggs per season, which are folded individually into leaves of aquatic plants. Eggs and larvae are smaller than in the other crested newt species, and they take longer (two to four months) until they reach metamorphosis and leave the water.

Both in water and on land, the newts are largely nocturnal. In their aquatic habitats, they hide under vegetation, and on land, they use structures such as logs, rocks, or small animal burrows for cover. They feed mainly on different invertebrates, but in the water may also prey on tadpoles and smaller newts. Predators include herons and other birds, snakes such as the grass snake, and various carnivorous mammals.

== Threats and conservation ==
The population of the Danube crested newt has declined significantly, and the International Union for Conservation of Nature has assessed its conservation status as "least concern". The main threat is habitat destruction by humans, especially through drainage, damming, or pollution. Hybridisation with other crested newt species and a loss of breeding ponds because of decreasing spring rain in the southern range (possibly due to global warming) are also seen as threats. Like the other crested newts, T. dobrogicus is listed in the Berne Convention (appendix II) and the EU Habitats Directive (annexes II and IV), and capture, disturbance, killing, trade, and destruction of habitats are prohibited.

== See also ==
- List of amphibians of Europe
