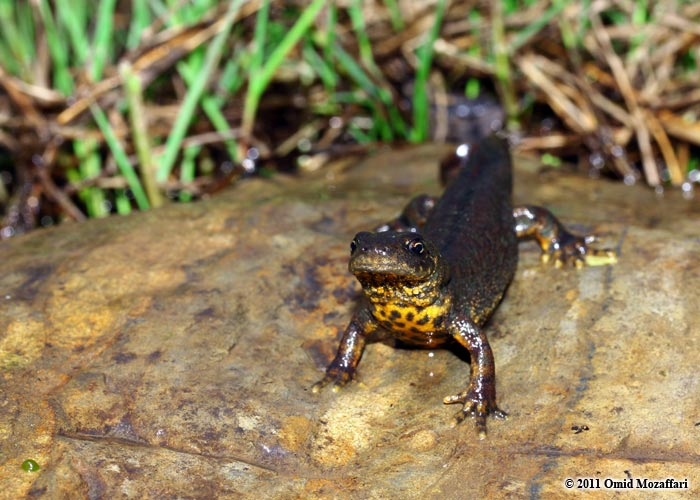

Conservation status
- Least Concern (IUCN 3.1)

Scientific classification
- Kingdom: Animalia
- Phylum: Chordata
- Class: Amphibia
- Order: Urodela
- Family: Salamandridae
- Genus: Triturus
- Species: T. karelinii

Binomial name
- Triturus karelinii (Strauch, 1870)
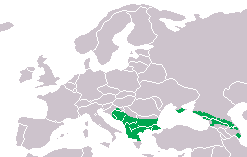

Synonyms
- Triton karelinii (Strauch, 1870); Triton longipes (Strauch, 1870); Molge cristata var. karelinii (Boulenger, 1882); Molge cristata var. longipes (Boulenger, 1882); Triton cristatus var. karelinii (Durigen, 1897); Triton lobatus spp. meridionalis (Fatio, 1900); Turanomolge mensbieri (Nikolskii, 1918); Molge karelinii var. macedonica (Karman, 1922); Triton cristatus karelinii forma taurica (Wolterstorff, 1923); Triton cristatus karelinii forma byzanthina (Wolterstroff, 1923); Triton cristatus karelinii forma bureschi (Wolterstorff, 1925); Triotn (Neotriton) carnifex karelinii (Bolkay, 1927); Triturus cristatus karelinii (Mertens & Muller, 1928); Triturus cristatus karelinii forma rilaica (Buresch & Zonkov, 1941); Turanomolge menzbieri (Terentjev & Chernov, 1949); Triturus cristatus carnifex var. albanicus (Dely, 1959); Triturus cristatus karelinii (Mertens & Wermuth, 1960)

= Southern crested newt =

Species of amphibian

The southern crested newt (Triturus karelinii) is a terrestrial European newt. It is similar to the northern crested newt (Triturus cristatus) except larger and more robust.

In 2013, the Balkan-Anatolian crested newt (Triturus ivanbureschi) was separated from the southern crested newt, and in 2016, the Anatolian crested newt (Triturus anatolicus) was separated from T. ivanbureschi, henceforth just the Balkan crested newt.

== Physical characteristics ==
Southern crested newts are brown to gray dorsally, with darker patches scattered about. Their bellies and throats are orange, with small black dots. They grow up to 7.1 in (18 cm). Males have a large jagged crest from behind their necks down to their tails.

== Range ==
Southern crested newts occur on Crimea, and in the Caucasus and south of the Caspian Sea, whereas the populations on the southeast Balkan peninsula and western Anatolia belong to the Balkan crested newt while those of northern Anatolia belong to the Anatolian crested newt.

== Habitat ==
The southern crested newt lives in a variety of mountain habitats, including both broadleaf and coniferous forests, slopes, and plateaus.

== Lifecycle ==
Sexual maturity is reached at three to four years old. During the breeding season, they are found in most sources of water, such as swamps, lakes, stagnant ponds, ditches and temporary pools, and streams. Males usually live to about eight, and females to 11 years old.
