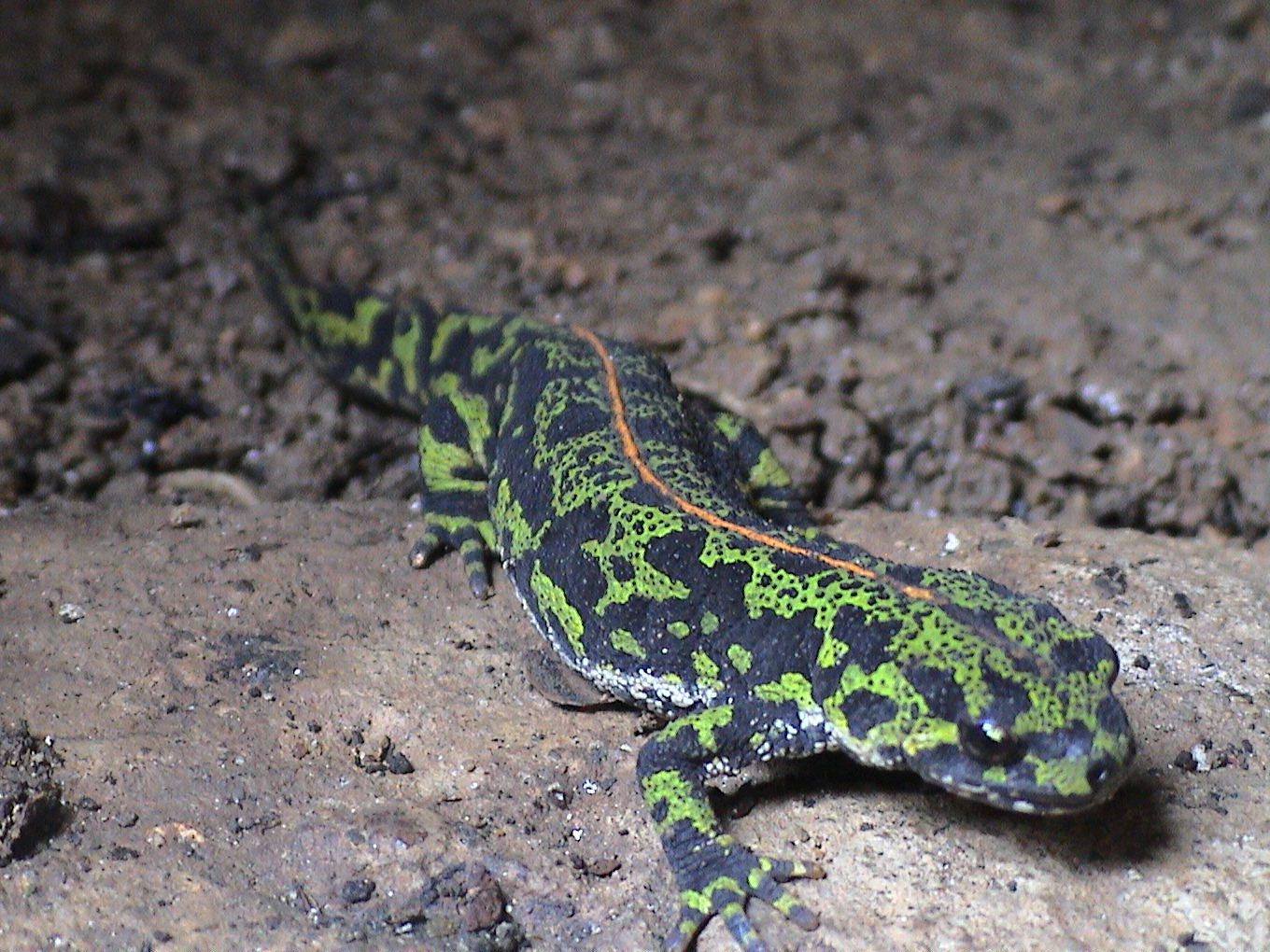

Conservation status
- Vulnerable (IUCN 3.1)

Scientific classification
- Kingdom: Animalia
- Phylum: Chordata
- Class: Amphibia
- Order: Urodela
- Family: Salamandridae
- Genus: Triturus
- Species: T. marmoratus

Binomial name
- Triturus marmoratus (Latreille, 1800)
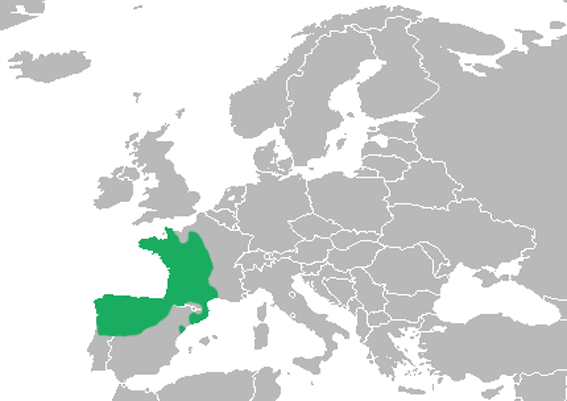
- Distribution of the marbled newt in Western Europe

= Marbled newt =

Species of amphibian

The marbled newt (Triturus marmoratus) is a mainly terrestrial newt native to western Europe. They are found in the Iberian Peninsula and France, where they typically inhabit mountainous areas.

== Habitat and distribution ==
The marbled newt is typically found in habitats characterized by hilly and forestry terrain, away from open and exposed areas. Marbled newts live in temporary habitats, such as ponds, that are subject to change depending on the climate conditions of the region. When rainfall is high and the temperature is lower, typically in the fall and winter months, adult marbled newts stay in the ponds. However, these shallow ponds are subject to drought in warmer spring and summer months, which forces the marbled newts to remain on land. Due to this constant change in the habitat conditions, marbled newts have the ability to adapt to different climatic conditions and habitat changes.

The characteristics of the marbled newt's habitat have also been found to affect the maturity of both males and females. Newts found in Mediterranean regions have been found to mature earlier than those in regions of France and Portugal. Due to the harsher conditions associated with the climate in Mediterranean regions, marbled newts experience a higher rate of adult mortality; therefore, maturing earlier is advantageous.

== Description ==
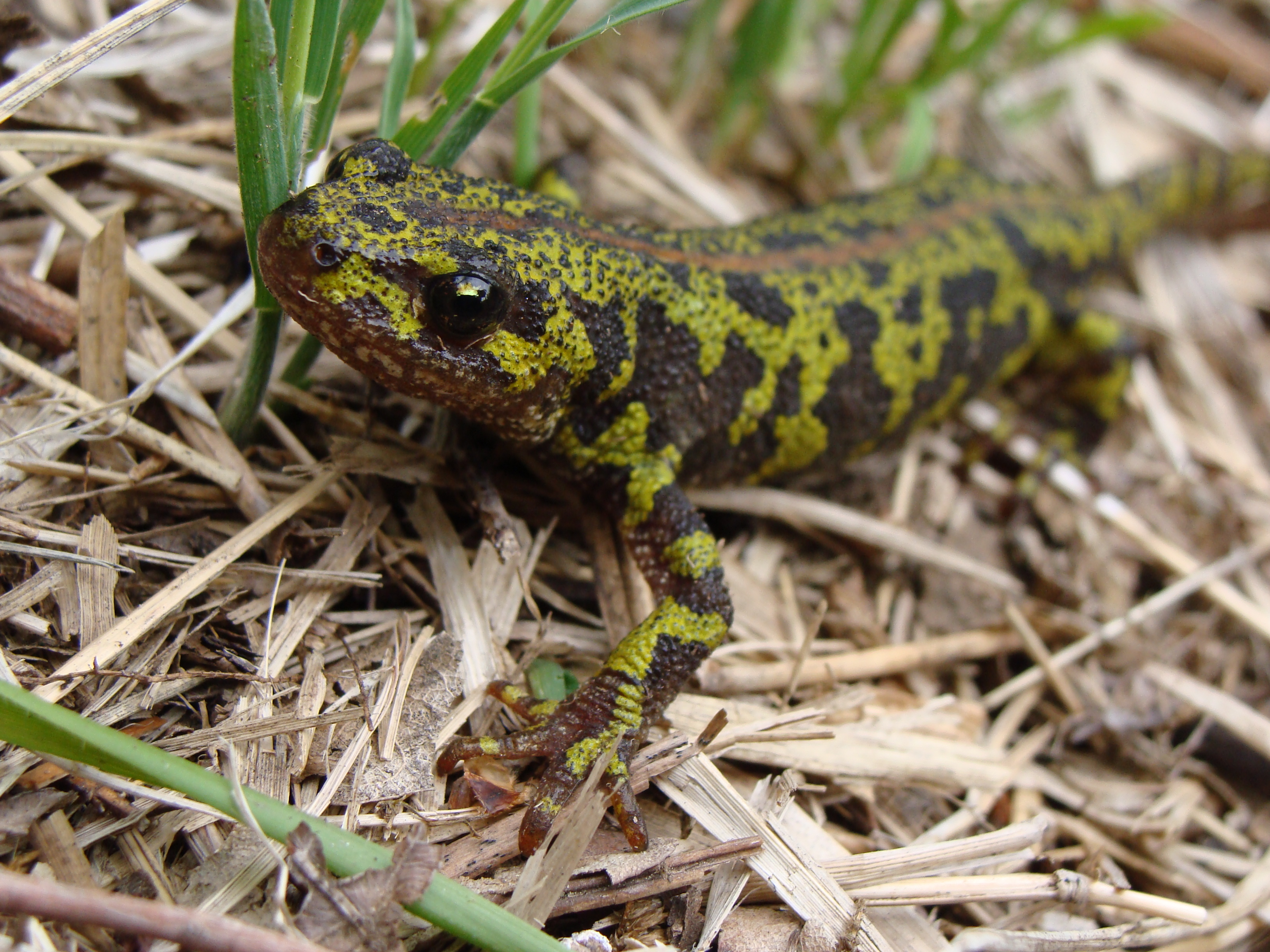
Marbled newt in the Peneda-Gerês National Park, Portugal

Marbled newts have dark brown or black bodies with irregular patterns of green. They have black bellies with off-white specks. Adult females have an orange stripe running down the back from the head to the tip of the tail. Juveniles also have this stripe, but the stripe fades on males at about 9 months. Breeding males have a large wavy crest that runs from its neck down to the tip of its tail, but is a little bit shorter where the tail meets the body. The crest is striped yellowish-white with black. Adult marbled newts range from 5 inches (13 cm) to 6.5 inches (17 cm) long.

== Life history ==
Both males and females follow similar directions for pre- and post-breeding migrations. Migration occurring in the spring is also significantly different from winter. Migration also puts the newts at increased risk of predation due to exposition to a larger group of predators. Desiccation as a result of migration is also a concern. Marbled newts typically migrate a short distance initially, covering a distance of about 10 meters. However, the newts have been shown to migrate up to 160 meters away from their initial habitat. Migration routes filled with trees and bushes are preferred because they allow for adequate shelter, minimizing the amount of open area that the newt could be exposed to. The newts can also migrate through open areas if underground refuges are available as coverage.

== Reproduction and life cycle ==
=== Life cycle ===
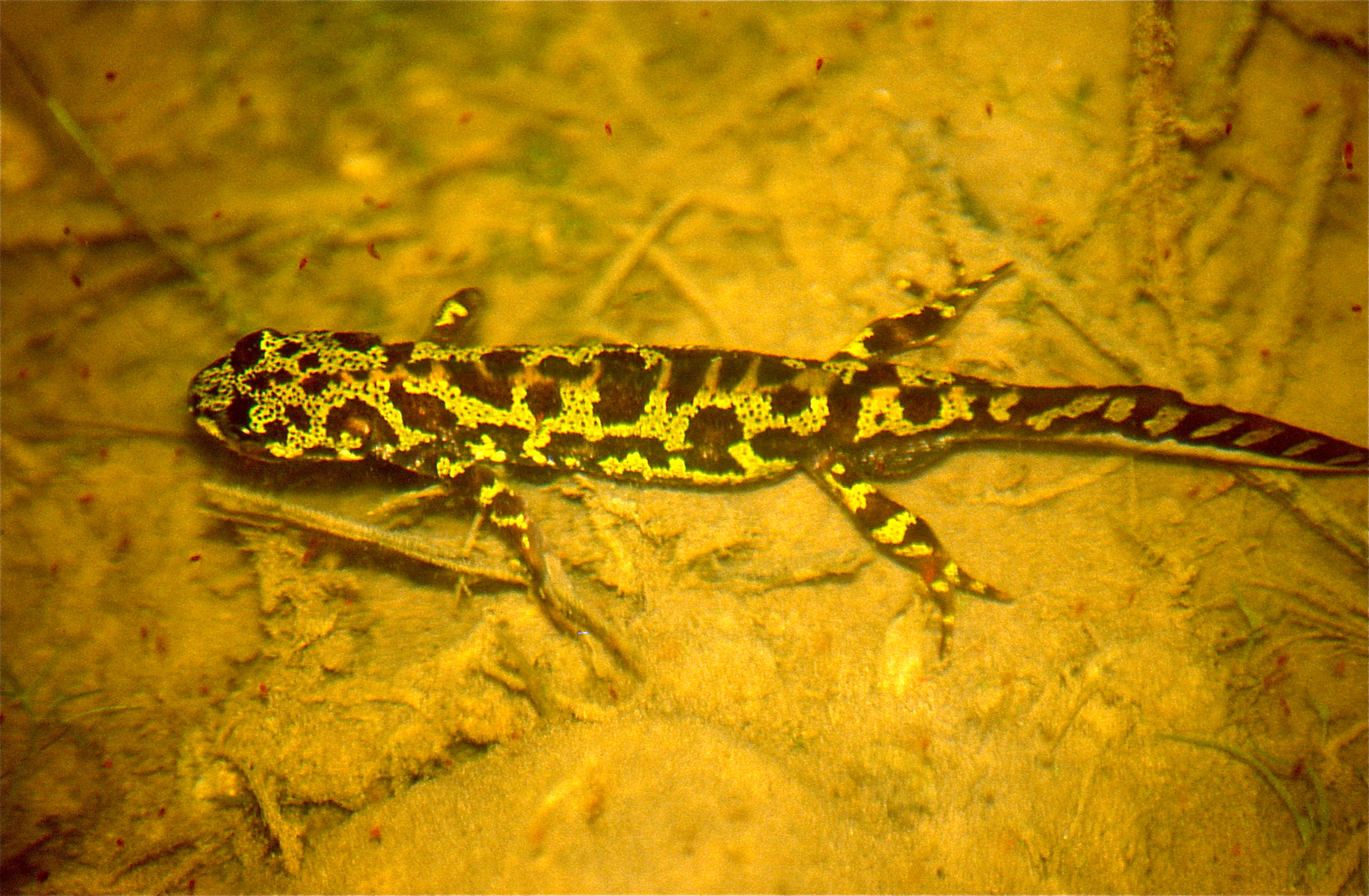
Marbled newt in water

Differences in environmental conditions are responsible for changes in bone density and formation for marbled newts living in different areas. The marbled newts, like some other amphibians, experience a phase of growth in the spring and summer. This is then followed by growth arrest in the winter. Observing the changes in growth is an important benchmark to have in marbled newts, as climate change is significantly impacting their typical environmental conditions. The breeding season for the newts begins in February and larvae hatch in late March. The metamorphosis phase is from April until the end of June, with new juveniles leaving at the end of June at the latest. During the most intense part of the summer (July–September), breeding ponds dry up. This causes a significant decrease in activity, which increases again only when rainfall began again in August.

The marbled newt locates breeding ponds primarily through celestial cues. It was found that when these cues are unavailable, they do not migrate. When tested under clear and overcast sky conditions, the newts were not able to orient themselves accordingly. However, when altering the geomagnetic field of their location, the newts showed no change in orientation, which suggests that an altered geomagnetic field does not affect orientation. Other possibilities for orientation include specific odors of the pond as well as visual landmarks that can serve as cues of correct or incorrect location.

Another form of locating breeding ponds for marbled newts are acoustic cues. It has been found that marbled newts sometimes use the calls of another frog, B. calamita, to locate their breeding ponds. While the ears of newts are not as complex as those of humans, they have inner ears capable of processing sound. Sound can be used to aid in finding breeding ponds, but celestial cues remain essential for successful location of breeding ponds.

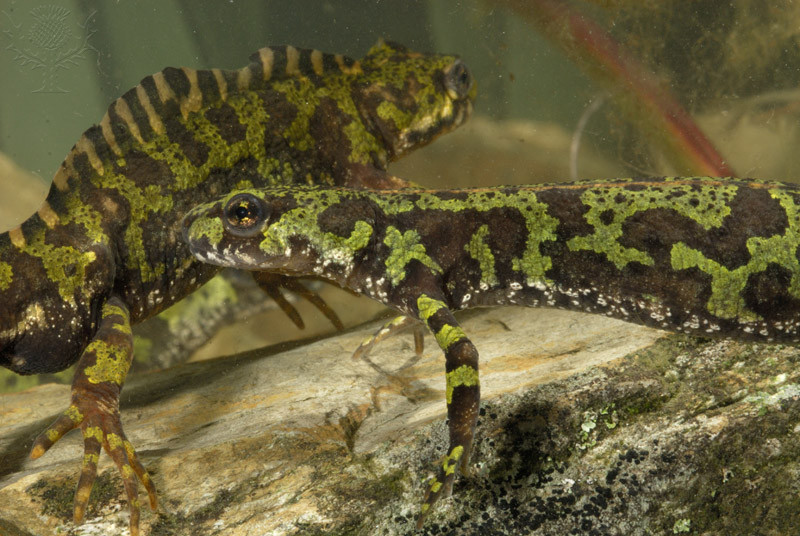
Female marbled newt with male in background in Girona, Spain

=== Oviposition ===
Since males do not need to be present for egg deposition, females have full control of oviposition, choosing both location and time. Females prefer to lay their eggs in a different location each time in an attempt to decrease mortality. Each egg is deposited and carefully folded by its hind legs within an aquatic leaf that had been carefully chosen by the female. The female smells and inspects the chosen leaf prior to wrapping it around the egg.

Failures in egg laying can occur. These typically follow or come before the successful deposition of an egg. In some cases, the leaf chosen is too small for deposition or is already occupied by another egg. The eggs are folded within leaves as a way to provide parental care. The time taken to choose and carefully wrap each egg within a leaf is a form of parental investment from the mother as a way to protect the egg. The process of oviposition also interrupts breathing; therefore, the time taken for this process is very important. There are cases in which female marbled newts are forced to halt oviposition in order to take a breath at the surface. It has been found that larger females experience more success in oviposition because they are able to endure longer periods of time without taking a breath relative to smaller females. By the same reasoning, larger females also experience fewer failed attempts at oviposition than their smaller counterparts, allowing them to be more efficient at reproduction.

=== Sexual selection ===
Males have shown a preference for larger female newts. This is because, as described above, larger females show increased efficiency in oviposition in comparison to smaller female newts. Such increased efficiency allows for a decrease in parental investment and energy cost associated with oviposition.

Marbled newts experience a female-biased sexual dimorphism with regards to size. Females are not only significantly larger than males, but also experience a longer life span. This combined with reaching sexual maturity at a younger age in comparison to males are causes for increased female fecundity. Larger females are thought to produce larger offspring, who in turn have more reproductive success. Males have a discernible crest selected for by females. The height of the crest offers an indication of good fitness and physical condition, making mates with a higher crest more desirable by females.

During courtship with females, males perform 'tail-lashing' in order to spread their pheromones. This also draws attention to the males and accentuates their long tailfin, another trait also selected for by female choice. Males are able to spread these pheromones because they are equipped with a set of glands that females do not have. This trait directly affects male reproductive success as it is used solely in attracting a mate and offers no other benefits.

== Conservation ==
The marbled newt is listed as near-threatened on the French national red list of species. Conservation planning should take into consideration buffer zones surrounding ponds and the ecological requirements associated with them while the marbled newts are migrating. These wetlands in the buffer zone are important in order to allow the newts to successfully complete their biological cycles. It is important to ensure that there are adequate, good-quality, shelters for marbled newts to use during migration in order to reduce the predation and desiccation risk associated with migration.

Changes in the marbled newt habitat have occurred over the last few years. With the loss of many forest areas, their typical ranges are being diminished along with their population. This loss of habitat is allowing the range and population of another newt, T. cristatus, to expand. This newt species prefers open and flat areas. The largest cause of habitat loss is climate change, with land use cover being the secondary cause. Climate change directly affects the water cycle and temperature—two very important environmental factors for amphibian species. These changes have the ability to directly affect the migration range and general territory of the marbled newts. The range of the newts has been reduced over the past few years and is expected to experience further restrictions over the course of the 21st century. While large-scale experiments have been done to assess the general risk of climate change and direct human impact on the habitat of marbled newts, more local and smaller-scale studies must be performed to determine the full range of effects on these newts.

=== Hybridization ===
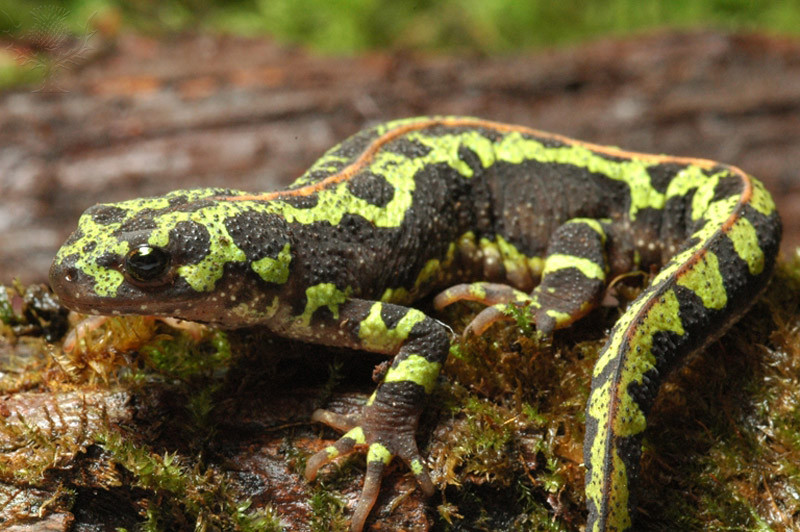
Adolescent male marbled newt (Triturus marmoratus)

T. cristatus and T. marmoratus (marbled newts) overlap in some areas in France where their habitat preferences overlap; this allows them to hybridize. T. cristatus has been known to occupy increasingly larger areas due to climate change fragmenting the habitat of the marbled newt. Despite the loss of habitat, the marbled newt has experienced more reproductive success. Females have a longer life-span and thus more years to reproduce. The eggs of both T. cristatus and T. marmoratus suffer the same mortality rates. The hybrids of these two species have even more fecundity than the marbled newts, but their eggs and embryos are less likely to survive.
