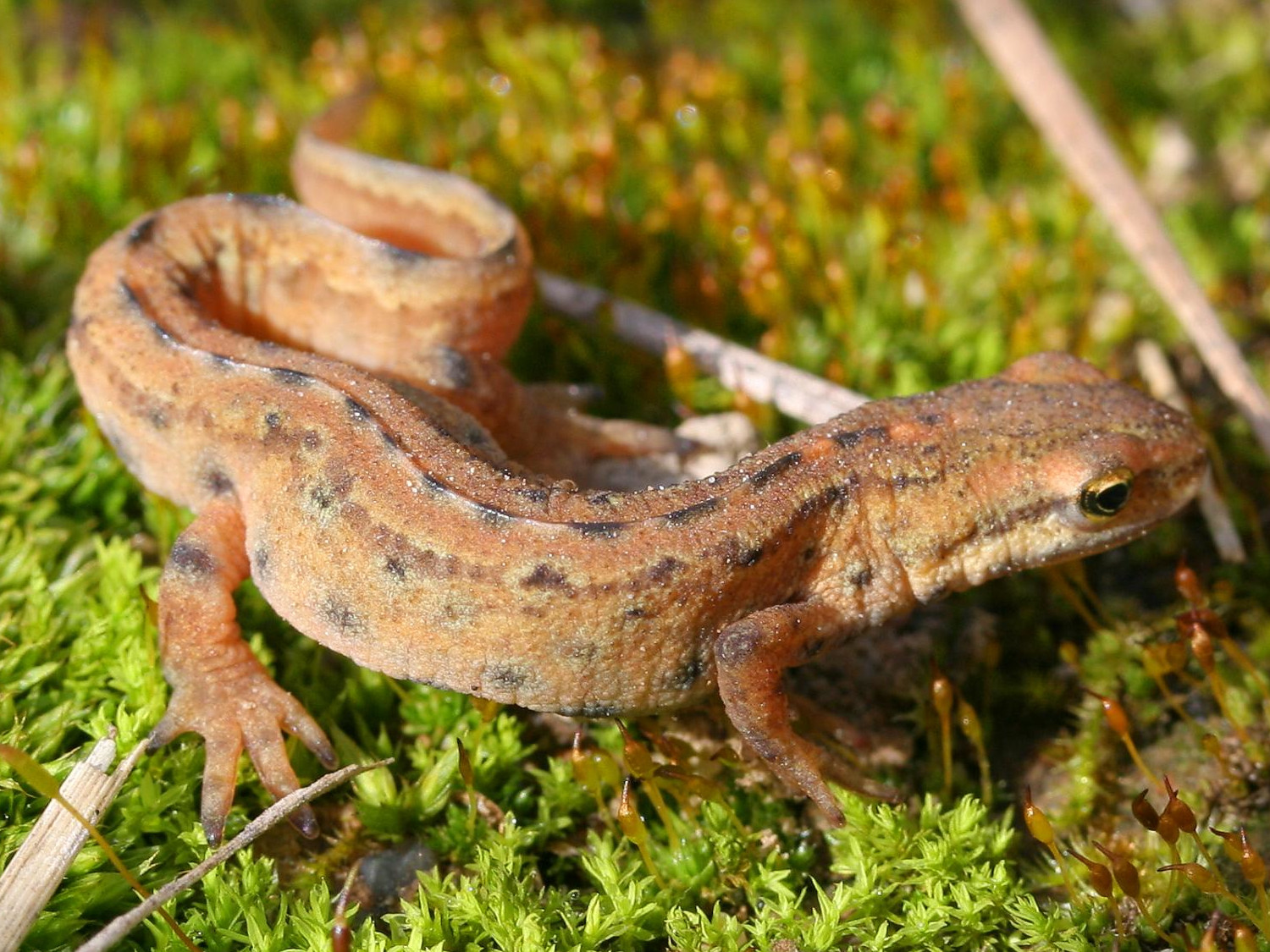
- Male during land phase

Conservation status
- Least Concern (IUCN 3.1)

Scientific classification
- Kingdom: Animalia
- Phylum: Chordata
- Class: Amphibia
- Order: Urodela
- Family: Salamandridae
- Genus: Lissotriton
- Species: L. vulgaris

Binomial name
- Lissotriton vulgaris (Linnaeus, 1758)

Subspecies
- L. vulgaris ampelensis (Fuhn, 1951); L. vulgaris meridionalis (Boulenger, 1882); L. vulgaris vulgaris (Linnaeus, 1758)

Synonyms
- 48, including: Lacerta vulgaris Linnaeus, 1758; Salamandra exigua Laurenti, 1768; Triton palustris Laurenti, 1768; Molge punctata Merrem, 1820; Triturus vulgaris Dunn, 1918

= Smooth newt =

Species of amphibian

The smooth newt, European newt, northern smooth newt or common newt (Lissotriton vulgaris) is a species of newt. It is widespread in Europe and parts of Asia, and has also been introduced to Australia. Individuals are brown with a spotted underside that ranges in colour from orange to white. They reach an average length of 8–11 cm (3.1–4.3 in), with males being larger than females. The newts' skins are dry and velvety when they are living on land, but become smooth when they migrate into the water to breed. Males develop a more vivid colour pattern and a conspicuous skin seam (crest) on their back during the breeding season.

The smooth newt was originally described by Carl Linnaeus as a lizard, and was then given different genus names before being classified as a member of Lissotriton. There are currently three accepted subspecies of smooth newt. Formerly, there were also four subspecies—all with more restricted ranges that are now classified as separate species, because they have been found to be distinct genetically as well as in appearance: the Caucasian smooth newt, the Greek smooth newt, Kosswig's smooth newt and Schmidtler's smooth newt. Together with these four species and the Carpathian newt, the smooth newt forms what is known as a species complex: some of the species hybridise with each other.

For most of the year, smooth newts live on land, are mostly nocturnal, and hide during the day. They can adapt to a wide range of natural or semi-natural habitats, from forests at field edges to parks and gardens. Their diet consists mainly of invertebrates such as insects and earthworms and they are mainly preyed upon by fish, birds and snakes. Between spring and summer, they breed in ponds or similar bodies of water. Males court females with a ritualised underwater display. Females lay their eggs on water plants, and larvae hatch after 10 to 20 days. The larvae develop for around three months before metamorphosing into terrestrial juveniles, at which point they become known as efts. They reach maturity after two to three years, and the adults live for up to 14 years.

The smooth newt is abundant over much of its range and is classified as a species of least concern by the International Union for Conservation of Nature (IUCN). However, it has been negatively affected by habitat destruction and fragmentation, as well as the introduction of new species of fish. Like other European amphibians, the smooth newt has now been listed as a protected species by the Berne Convention.

== Taxonomy ==
Swedish naturalist Carl Linnaeus described the smooth newt in 1758 as Lacerta vulgaris, placing it in the same genus as the green lizards. It was later re-described under several different species and genus names, including Triton, Molge, Salamandra and Lissotriton, with in total 48 species synonyms published. Most recently, it was included in the genus Triturus, along with most European newts. This genus was found to be polyphyletic, containing several unrelated lineages, and the small-bodied newts, including the smooth newt, were therefore split off as separate genus in 2004 by García-París and colleagues. They used the name Lissotriton, introduced by the English zoologist Thomas Bell in 1839 with the smooth newt as type species but then considered a synonym of Triturus. "Lissotriton" is a combination of the Greek λισσός (lissós), meaning "smooth", and the name of Triton, an ancient Greek god of the sea, while the species epithet vulgaris means "common" in Latin.

Three subspecies are accepted by Pabijan, Wielstra and colleagues: L. v. vulgaris, L. v. ampelensis and L. v. meridionalis. These authors, followed by Amphibian Species of the World, recognise four former subspecies from southern Europe and west Asia as separate species, as they are morphologically and genetically distinct: the Greek smooth newt (L. graecus), Kosswig's smooth newt (L. kosswigi), the Caucasian smooth newt (L. lantzi) and Schmidtler's smooth newt (L. schmidtleri). The five smooth newt species and the Carpathian newt (L. montadoni), which is their sister species, have collectively been referred to as the "smooth newt species complex".

To distinguish the smooth newt from its close relatives, the English name "northern smooth newt" has been suggested. Other common names that have been used in the literature include: common newt, great water-newt, common water-newt, warty eft, water eft, common smooth newt, small newt, small eft, small evet, and brown eft.

== Evolution ==
Molecular phylogenetic analyses have shown that the smooth newt is distinct from its four close relatives – the Caucasian, Greek, Kosswig's, and Schmidtler's smooth newt – which were formerly considered to be subspecies (see section Taxonomy above). The relationships within this species complex remain unclear. Within the smooth newt itself, genetic groups do not entirely correspond to the currently accepted subspecies (ampelensis, meridionalis, vulgaris), which were described based on morphology. It is estimated that the five smooth newt species collectively were estimated to have diverged from the Carpathian newt around four to six million years ago.

Genetic analyses have also demonstrated ongoing gene flow between the smooth newt and its relatives. Although the Carpathian newt is clearly different in appearance, hybridisation between the two species is frequent. It has been shown that smooth newt mitochondrial DNA has introgressed into and completely replaced that of the Carpathian newt populations. Partial introgression has also occurred from the smooth newt to the Greek smooth newt. These patterns are likely due to the range expansion and secondary contact of species after the Last Glacial Maximum, which they likely survived in refugia mainly in southern and eastern Europe. The palmate newt (Lissotriton helveticus), although often occurring in the same habitats, almost never hybridises with the smooth newt. Artificial crosses with even more distant species such as the alpine (Ichthyosaura alpestris) and northern crested (Triturus cristatus) newts were successful in laboratory experiments.

== Description ==
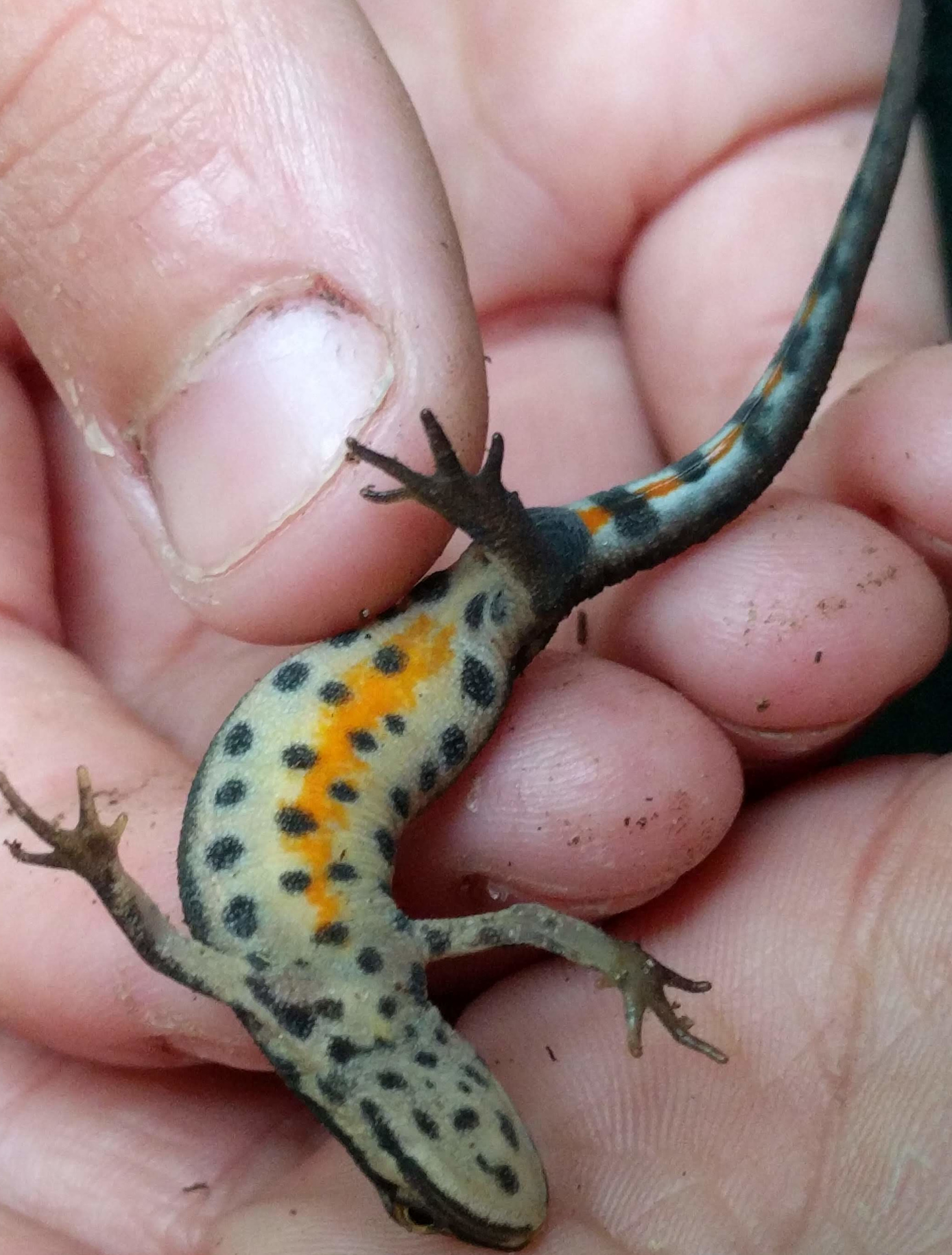
Throat and belly are spotted. The spots are larger in males (pictured) than in females.

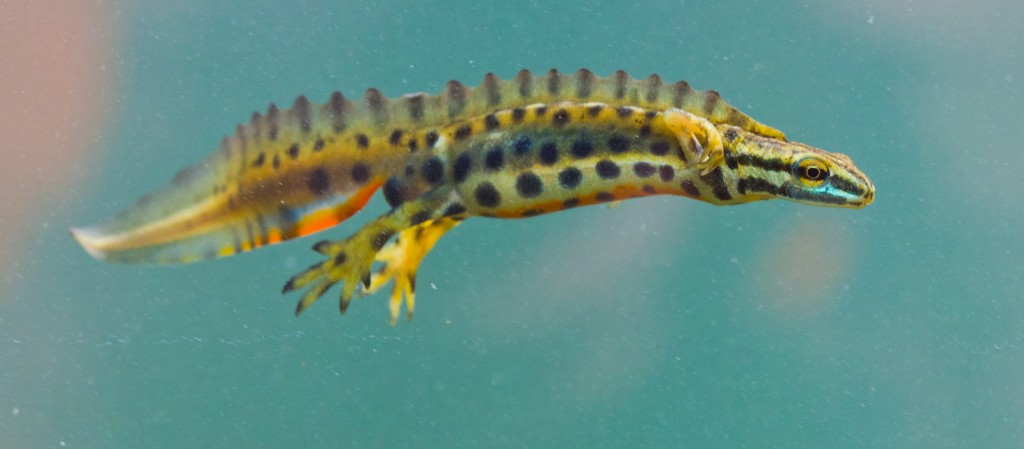
During breeding season, males develop vivid colours and a crest.

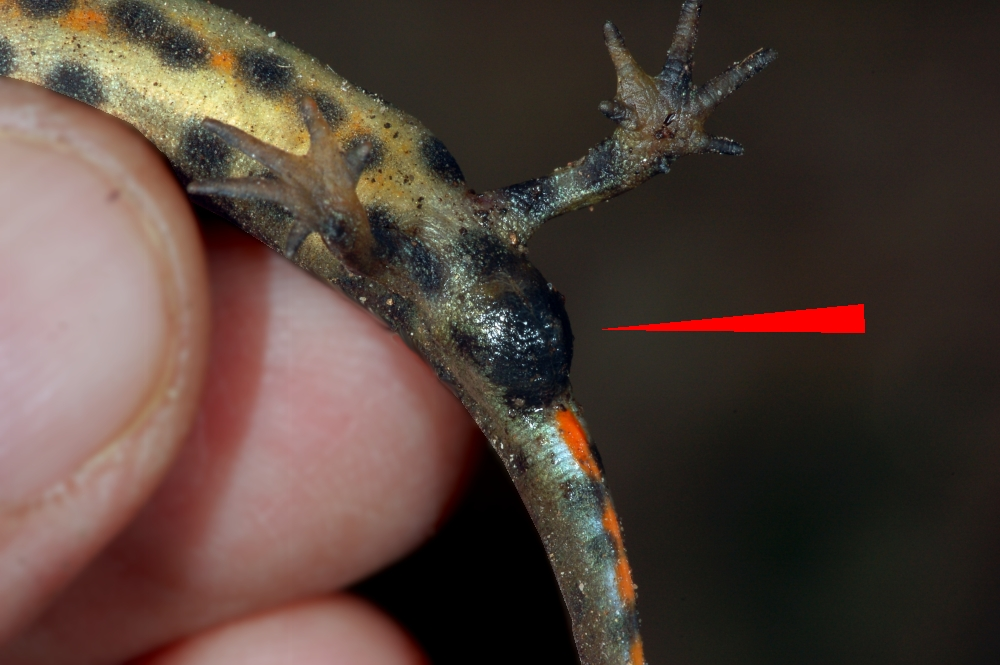
The cloaca is swollen in breeding males.

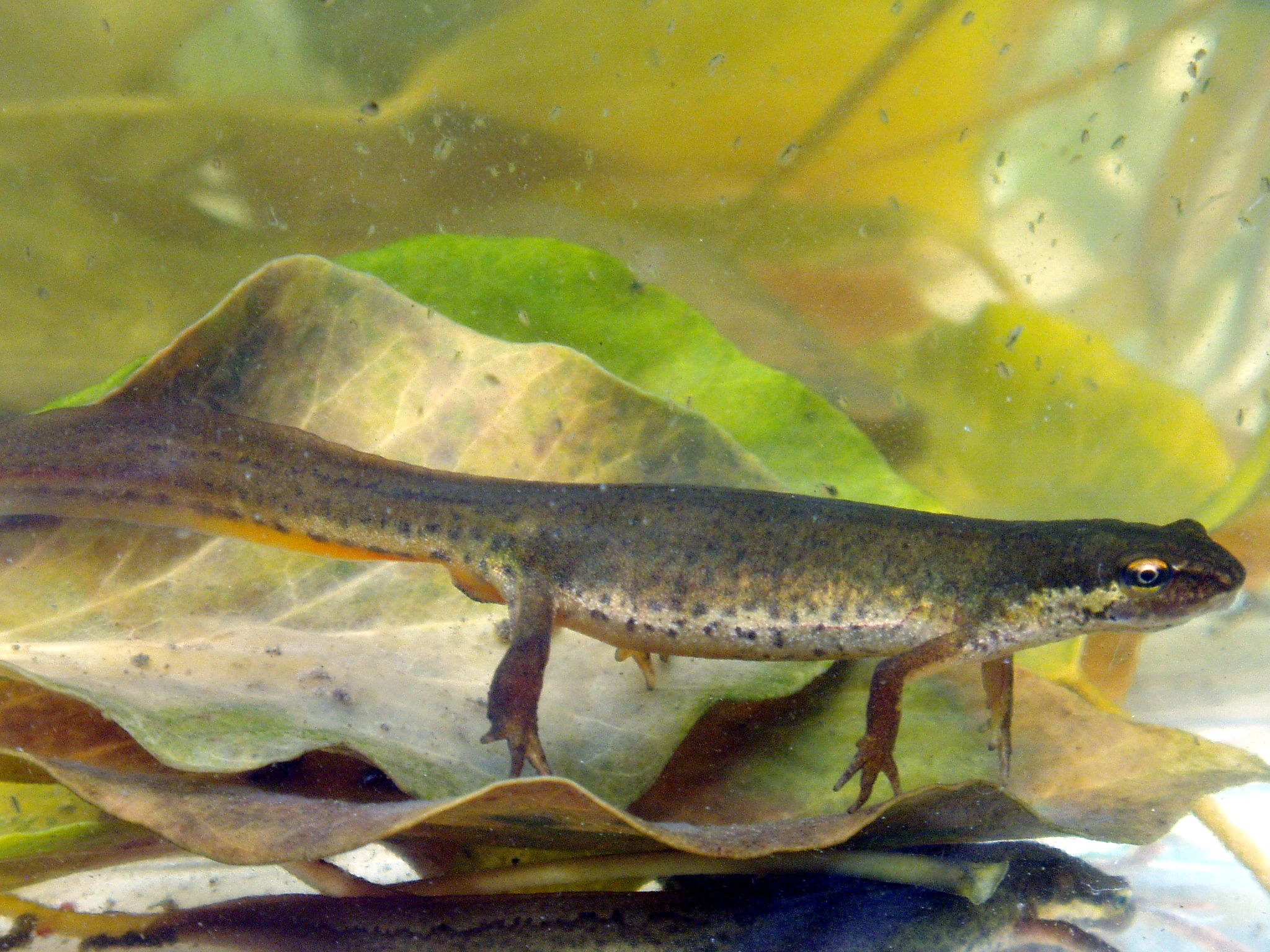
Breeding females are drab in colour and have no dorsal crest.

=== General characteristics ===
Adult male smooth newts reach a head-to-tail length of around 9–11 cm (3.5–4.3 in) and are thus slightly larger than the females, which reach 8–9.5 cm (3.1–3.7 in). Adult body weight varies between 0.3–5.2 g (0.011–0.183 oz), decreasing during the breeding season. The head is longer than it is wide and has two to three longitudinal grooves on the top. The elongated snout is blunt in the male and rounded in the female. The skin is velvety and water-repellent on land but smooth during the aquatic phase. It contains mucus and toxin glands and the upper layer is shed off regularly.

Outside of the breeding season, both sexes are yellow-brown, brown or olive-brown. Males have dark, round spots, while females have smaller spots of the same colour, which sometimes form two or more irregular lines along the back. Males have an orange stripe the underside of the tail and an orange to white throat and belly in males with small dark, rounded spots (these are lighter with smaller spots in females). Size and colour vary with the environment, and newts tend to be smaller in northern latitudes. Albinistic and leucistic individuals have been described.

The smooth newt is diploid (i.e. it has two copies of each chromosome), with 24 chromosomes in total.

=== Breeding characteristics ===
During the aquatic breeding season, males develop an uninterrupted skin crest running along their back and tail. This crest is 1–1.5 mm (0.039–0.059 in) high at mid-body, but higher along the tail. The tail also has a lower fin and a pointed end. The cloaca (the single digestive, urinary and reproductive orifice) of breeding males is swollen, round and dark-coloured. Depending on the subspecies, the hindfeet have more or less developed toe flaps. Colours are generally more vivid than during the land phase. The dark spots grow larger, and the crest often has vertical dark and bright bands. There are five to seven longitudinal stripes on the head. The lower edge of the tail is red with a silver-blue flash and black spots. Females have develop low straight tail fins, but no crest or toe flaps, and are more drably coloured.

Subspecies differ slightly in terms of the male secondary characteristics: L. v. ampelensis has strongly developed toe flaps and a tail that tapers into a fine thread (but not a distinct filament). The body is also slightly square in cross-section. L. v. meridionalis also has toe flaps and a pointed tail, its crest is smooth-edged, and its body is square-shaped. In the nominate subspecies, L. v. vulgaris, the crest is clearly denticulated, toe flaps are only weakly developed and the body is round.

=== Larvae ===
The aquatic larvae are 6.5–7 mm (0.26–0.28 in) long and yellow-brown with two longitudinal stripes at hatching. They initially have, In addition to their gills, they initially have only two balancers at the sides of their heads, short appendages for attaching to plants which are resorbed within a few days. As with all salamanders, the forelegs develop before the hindlegs. The colour of the larvae changes to a more cryptic, darkly marbled yellow to brown as they grow. Larvae are very slender and resemble those of the palmate newt. They develop a skin seam running from the neck to the pointed tail, which is as long as the head and trunk combined. The larvae grow to 3–4.5 cm (1.2–1.8 in), which is also the size of the efts (terrestrial juveniles) just after metamorphosis.

=== Similar species ===
The smooth newt resembles the other, less widespread Lissotriton species. It can be confused especially with the closely related "smooth newt complex" species (marked with * in the table below) and the more distant palmate newt, which often occurs in the same area. Females are particularly challenging to distinguish, as the distinguishing features are primarily observed in the males during the breeding season.

Comparison of the smooth newt and related Lissotriton species
Species	Distribution	Breeding male characteristics				Other
Species	Distribution	Body shape	Dorsal crest	Toe flaps (hind feet)	Tail end	Other
Smooth newt* L. vulgaris	widespread from British Isles to Central Asia	round to square (depending on subspecies)	smooth or denticulated (depending on subspecies)	weakly to well developed (depending on subspecies)	pointed to elongated, no filament	
Bosca's newt L. boscai	West Iberian Peninsula	slightly square	none	none	short filament	belly with some dark spots, especially at sides
Carpathian newt* L. montandoni	Carpathians	square	very low, smooth-edged	weakly developed	blunt, with filament	belly unspotted
Caucasian smooth newt* L. lantzi	Caucasus	slightly square	high (less than 1 mm (0.039 in) at mid-body), denticulated (almost spine-shaped)	moderately developed	pointed, but no filament	
Greek smooth newt* L. graecus	Southern Balkans	square	low (less than 1 mm (0.039 in) at mid-body), smooth-edged	well developed	long filament	lower tail fin unspotted
Italian newt L. italicus	Southern Italy	slightly square	none	none	pointed, no filament	very small, 4.5–7.5 cm (1.8–3.0 in); throat with few or no spots; golden-yellow patch behind eyes in both sexes
Kosswig's smooth newt* L. kosswigi	Northern Anatolia	square	low (less than 1 mm (0.039 in) at mid-body) but higher at tail base	strongly developed	long filament	
Palmate newt L. helveticus	Western Europe	square	low, smooth-edged	strongly developed	long filament (both sexes)	throat unspotted
Schmidtler's smooth newt* L. schmidtleri	Anatolia and eastern Balkans	slightly square	high (more than 2 mm (0.079 in) at mid-body), denticulated	weakly developed	elongated, no filament	very small, 5–7 cm (2.0–2.8 in)

== Distribution ==
=== Native range ===
The smooth newt has been described as "the most ubiquitous and widely distributed newt of the Old World". The nominate subspecies, L. v. vulgaris, is most widespread and ranges natively from Ireland (where the smooth newt is the only newt species) and Great Britain in the west to Siberia and northern Kazakhstan in the east. In the north it reaches central Fennoscandia, and its southern limit is central France, northern Italy, the central Balkans and the dry Eurasian steppe of Ukraine and Russia. The subspecies L. v. ampelensis only occurs in the Carpathians of Ukraine and the Danube Delta of northern Romania, and L. v. meridionalis in the northern half of Italy, southern Switzerland, Slovenia and Croatia.

In the Carpathians, the smooth newt generally prefers lower elevations than the Carpathian newt. In the Balkans, the precise contact zones with the Greek smooth newt and Schmidtler's smooth newt are not yet clear. In central Italy, where the range of the smooth newt subspecies L. v. meridionalis overlaps with that of the Italian newt (L. italicus), it was found that the latter prefers a warmer and drier climate.

=== Introduced range ===
The nominate subspecies, L. v. vulgaris, has been introduced to Australia, which has no native salamander species. The smooth newt was available in the Australian pet trade until 1997, when it was declared a "controlled pest animal" because of the risk of introduction. The first wild sighting was recorded near Melbourne in 2011, and larvae were later found, indicating successful reproduction. There are fears that it will have negative impacts on the native fauna, including predation on and competition with native frogs and freshwater invertebrates, as well as toxicity and disease spread. The smooth newt could spread further in south-eastern Australia, where large areas have a suitable climate.

Within Europe, the subspecies L. v. meridionalis was introduced north of the Alps near Geneva, where it hybridises with the native L. v. vulgaris.

== Habitat and ecology ==
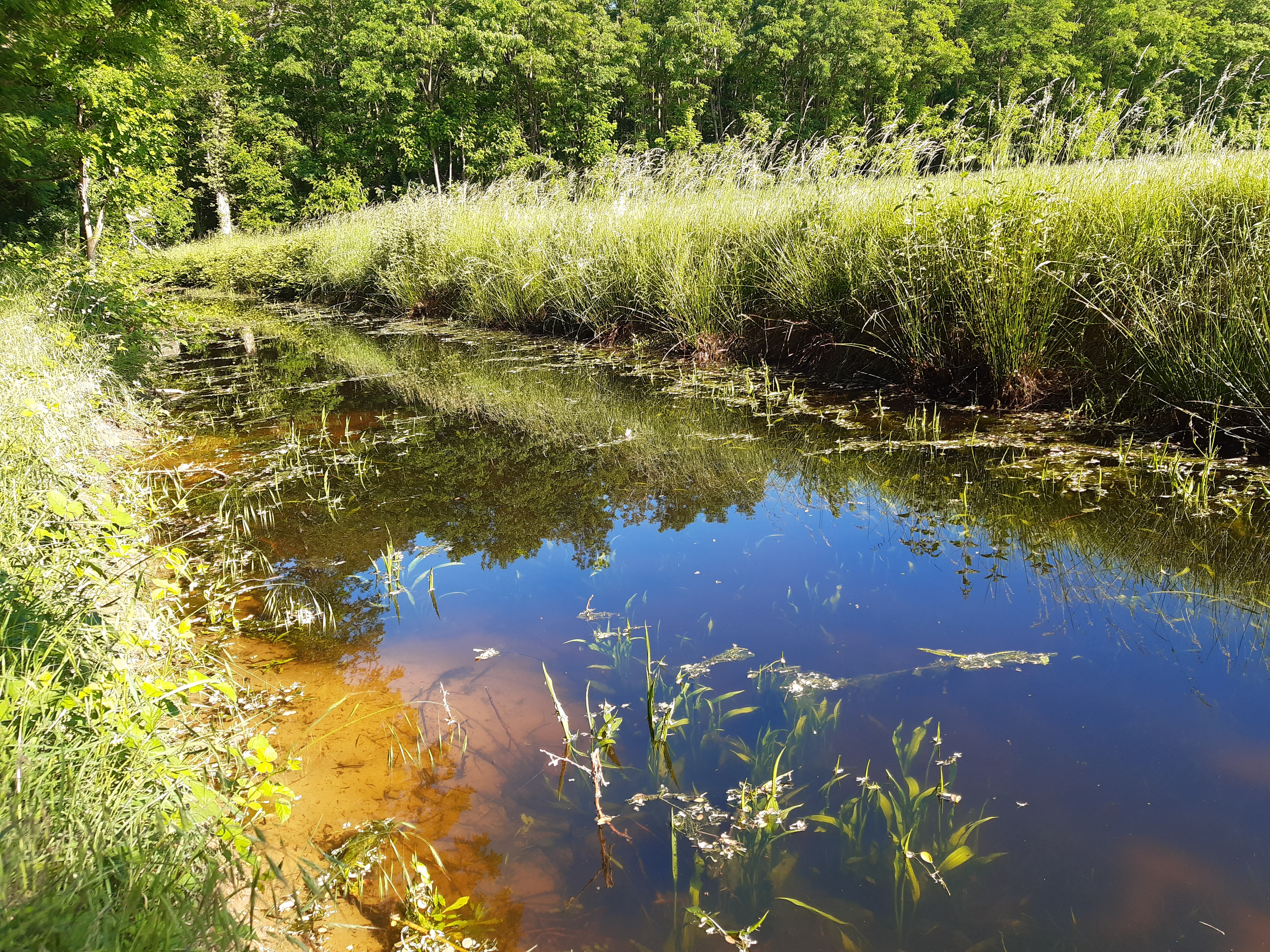
Sun-exposed, stagnant, shallow water bodies with abundant vegetation but without fish, such as this ditch, are typical breeding sites.

The smooth newt is primarily a lowland species, though it can occasionally be found at elevations above 1,000 m (3,300 ft). This species has a wide habitat breadth, as it is able to thrive in a variety of terrestrial and aquatic environments. On land, it inhabits wooded areas (dense coniferous woods are avoided), as well as more open areas such as damp meadows, field edges, parks, and gardens. It can also tolerate human disturbance and urban environments and will hide under structures such as logs or stones or in small mammal burrows. Smooth newts may also climb vegetation, although the exact function of this behaviour is currently unknown.

Freshwater breeding sites are usually exposed to the sun, free from fish, and filled with stagnant water for at least three months of the year. They are typically close to similar bodies of water and have shallow areas with an abundance of water plants. These sites can range in size from small puddles to larger ponds or shallow parts of lakes. Water quality is less important, with pH values ranging from 4 (more acidic) to 9.6 (more alkaline) being tolerated. In Germany, smooth newts have even been found in slightly brackish water. They often share breeding sites with other amphibians, including other newts. In northern France, for example, there are ponds with five newt species: smooth, palmate, alpine, northern crested and marbled (T. marmoratus) newt – have been described.

== Lifecycle and behaviour ==
Smooth newts live on land for most of the year and are mainly nocturnal. They also usually hibernate on land, often in groups of several individuals in winter shelters, such as under logs or in burrows, but they can be active during mild weather. The efts turn into mature adults at two to three years of age, and newts can live for 6–14 years in the wild. The newts recognise familiar territory using smell and visual cues, but they are unable to orient themselves in experiments when they were transported far away from the home range.

=== Reproduction ===
External videos
- The life cycle of the newt, British Council, 1942. Educational film on the smooth newt (10:08 min).

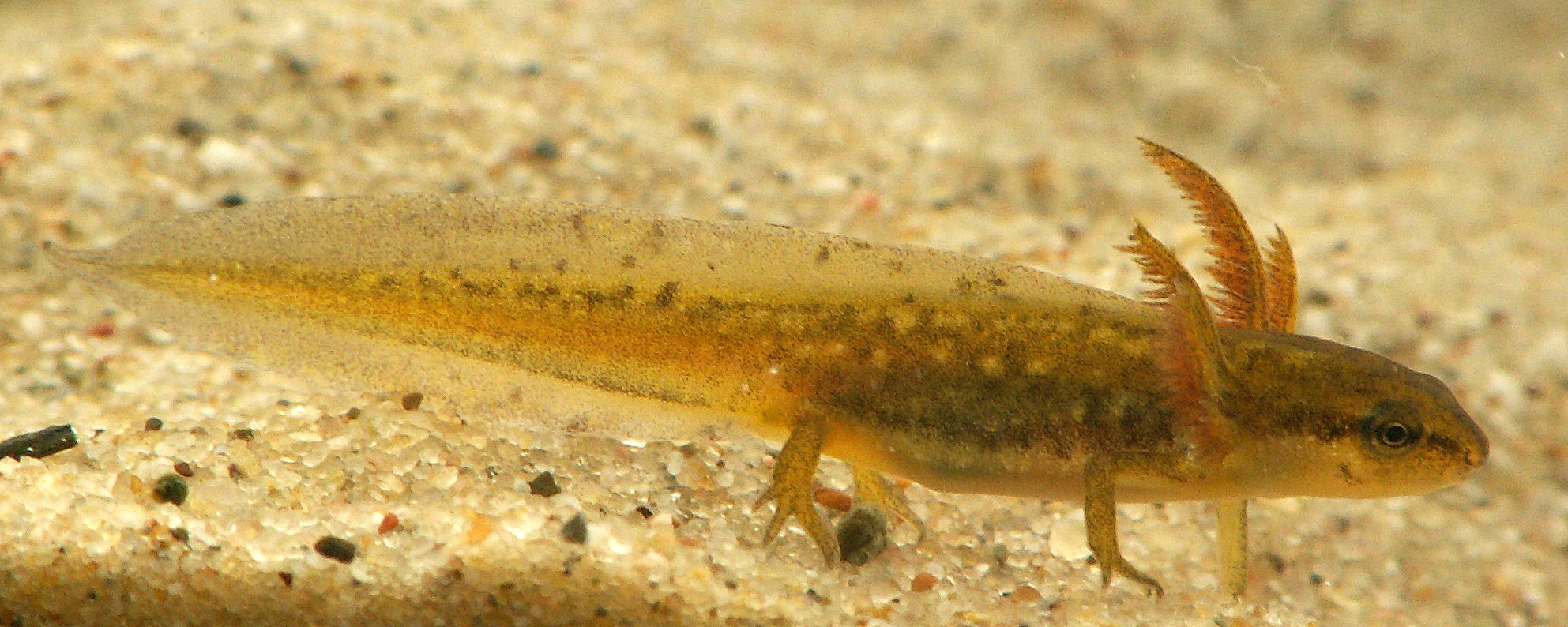
Well-developed larva shortly before metamorphosis

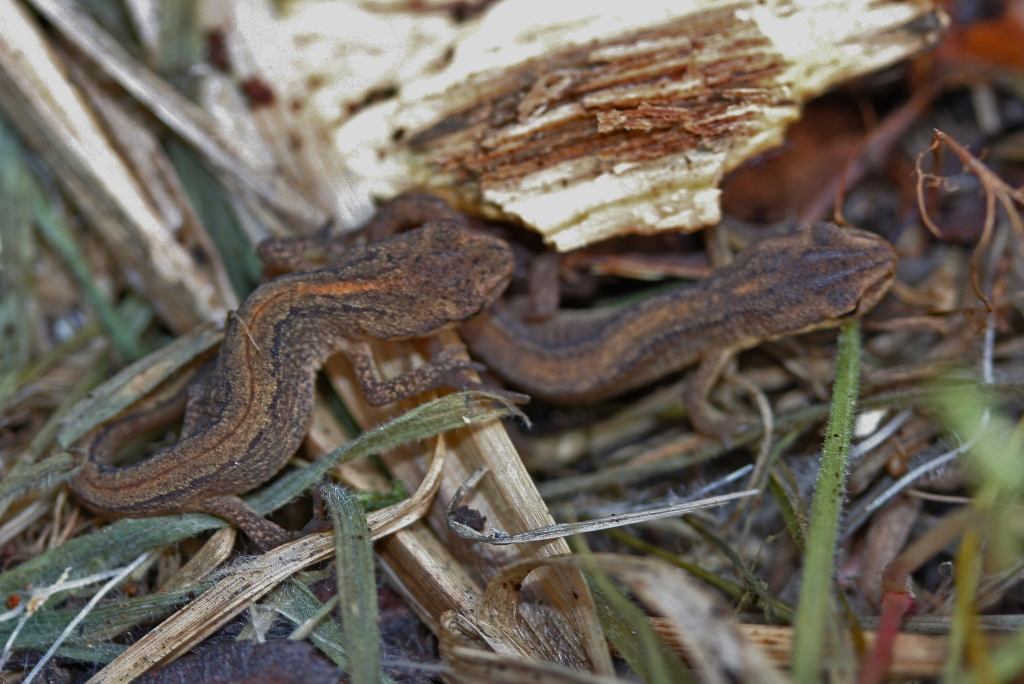
Two juveniles (efts) after the transition to land

Migration to the breeding sites can begin as early as February, but in the northernmost parts of the range and at higher altitudes, it may not start before summer. After entering the water, it takes a few weeks for the breeding characters, especially the male's crest, to develop.

The mating process involves an elaborate courtship display: the male swims in front of the female and sniffs her cloaca in an attempt to attract her. He then vibrates his tail against his body, sometimes violently lashing it, thereby fanning pheromones towards her. In the final phase, he moves away from her, his tail quivering. If she is still interested, she will follow him, touching his cloaca with her snout, whereupon he deposits a packet of sperm (a spermatophore). He then guides her over the spermatophore, enabling her to pick it up with her cloaca. Males often try to lead females away from competitors that are displaying.

Eggs are fertilised internally and the offspring of one female usually have multiple fathers. Females tend to mate preferentially with unrelated males, probably to avoid inbreeding depression.

Females lay 100–500 eggs, which they usually fold into the leaves of aquatic plants. The eggs are 1.3–1.7 mm (0.051–0.067 in) in diameter (2.7–4 mm (0.11–0.16 in) with jelly capsule) and light brown to greenish or grey in colour. Depending on temperature, larvae typically hatch after 10–20 days, and metamorphose into terrestrial efts after around three months.

Paedomorphism, where adults remain aquatic and retain their gills and skin seams, or only partially resorb them, occurs regularly, but only in a small proportion of individuals. This trait does not appear to be genetically determined, but is favoured by cold water, low population density and abundant aquatic prey. Wild paedomorphic individuals often metamorphosed when they were transferred into an aquarium.

=== Diet, predators and parasites ===
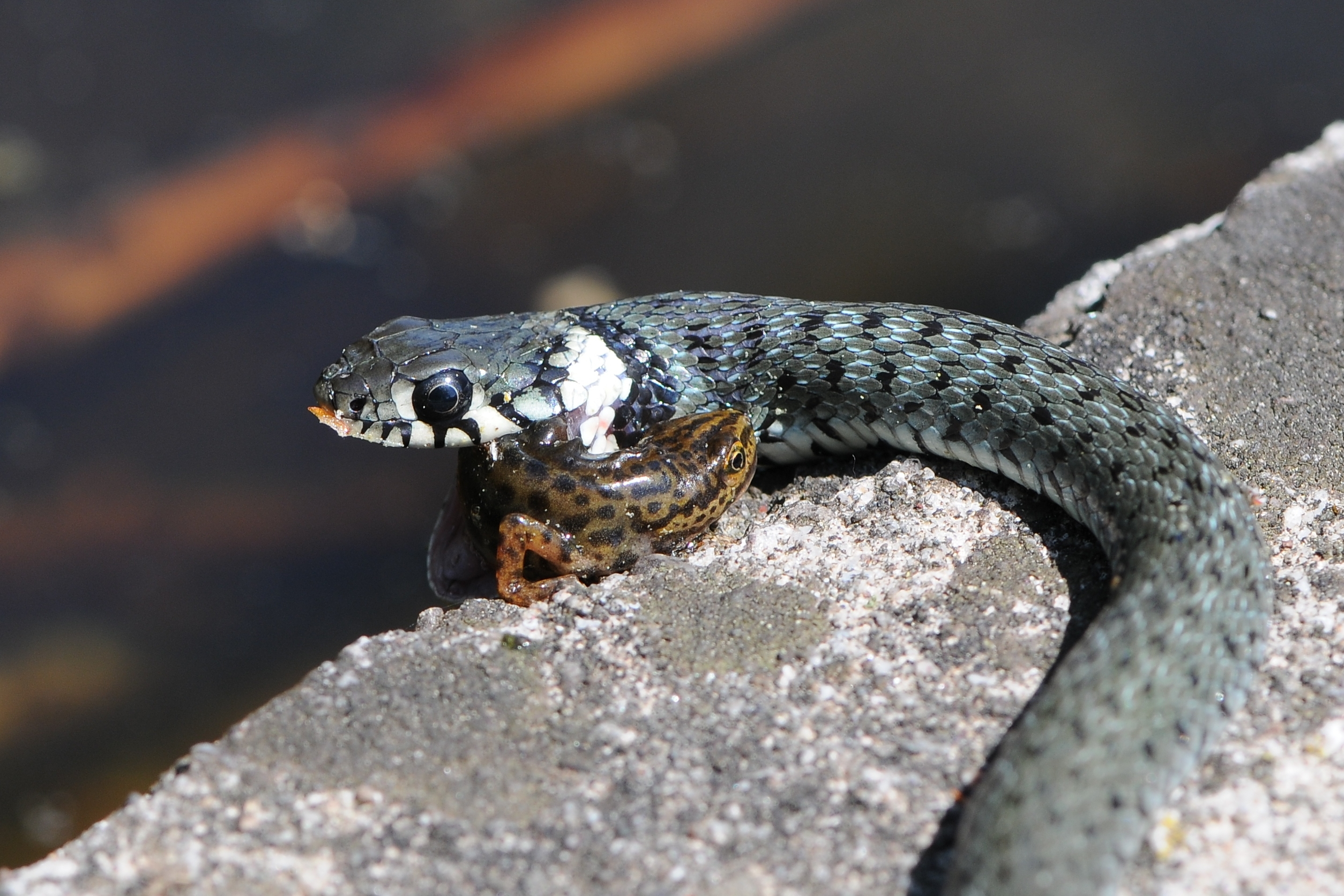
Grass snake eating a smooth newt

Smooth newts, including their larvae, are unselective carnivores that feed mainly on diverse invertebrates such as earthworms, snails, slugs, bivalves, spiders, ticks, mites, springtails or insects and insect larvae, as well as smaller plankton. Cannibalism also occurs, primarily through the predation of eggs of their own species. Various predators eat smooth newts, including waterbirds, badgers, snakes, monitor lizards and frogs, but also larger newts such as the northern crested newt.

Various pathogens and parasites have been found to infect smooth newts, including ranaviruses, a picornavirus, various protozoans, trematodes (of which Parastrigea robusta was found to cause the local decline of a population in Germany) and at least 31 species of helminths.

== Threats and conservation ==
The smooth newt is common over much of its range. In 2008, the IUCN, assessed its threat status as Least Concern and found no general decline in populations. However, this assessment included subspecies that are now recognised as separate species (see section Taxonomy above) and it therefore needs updating. Despite the overall low level of concern, the smooth newt is now listed on some national red lists, e.g. in Switzerland, the Czech Republic, and the Netherlands. Like all amphibians, it is also listed as protected species in the Berne Convention (Appendix III). Disturbance, capture, killing and trade are prohibited in Ireland under the Wildlife Act 1976, and trade in the UK under the Wildlife and Countryside Act 1981.

The threats facing smooth newts are similar to those affecting other amphibians. These include the loss of breeding ponds due to destruction or the introduction of fish, as well as the fragmentation of population caused by roads. Secondary habitats can help sustain the species, e.g. former gravel pits or quarries left open. The value of artificial water bodies as habitat can be improved when nearby hiding structures like stones or wood are added on land. Garden ponds are readily colonised if they are sun-exposed, have abundant water plants, no fish, and nearby hiding structures. Artificial hibernation sites ("newt hotels") were readily used in a study in Norway, especially by juveniles.

To mark and track individuals and monitor populations, researchers have often amputated phalanges of fingers and toes but these grow back quickly. A safer and less harmful approach is to record the unique patterns on the underside of the animals' bellies through photography. Researchers have also developed genetic methods based on microsatellite distribution to assess patterns of genetic diversity.

== Captivity ==
Smooth newts can be kept in captivity, but they must come from a legal source in accordance with the relevant legislation due to their protected status (see above). They require both a land and water phase, and hibernate for two to three months at 5–10 °C (41–50 °F). Juveniles remain terrestrial and will only return to water at maturity. In captivity, individuals have been known to live to ages of 4–8, and exceptionally up to 20 years.
