= Caucasian smooth newt =

Scientific classification
- Domain: Eukaryota
- Kingdom: Animalia
- Phylum: Chordata
- Class: Amphibia
- Order: Urodela
- Family: Salamandridae
- Genus: Lissotriton
- Species: L. lantzi

Binomial name
- Lissotriton lantzi (Wolterstorff, 1914)

Synonyms
- Triton vulgaris subsp. typica forma lantzi Wolterstorff, 1914; Molge vulgaris lantzi Nikolskii, 1918; Triturus vulgaris vulgaris forma lantzi Herre, 1933; Triturus vulgaris lantzi Krasavtsev, 1940; Lissotriton (Lissotriton) (vulgaris) lantzi Dubois and Raffaëlli, 2009

Species of amphibian

The Caucasian smooth newt or Caucasian newt (Lissotriton lantzi) is a newt species found in the Caucasus region, from the Don river mouth in Russia to Georgia, and potentially Armenia, Azerbaijan, extreme northeastern Turkey and Iran. It occurs from sea level to 2,500 m (8,200 ft) elevation.

Willy Wolterstorff described the species in 1914 as Triton vulgaris subsp. typica forma lantzi, a form of the smooth newt (now Lissotriton vulgaris), and it was later raised to subspecies rank. After genetic data had suggested the smooth newt was a complex of distinct lineages, Dubois and Raffaëlli, in 2009, recognised several subspecies, including the Caucasian smooth newt, as distinct species. This was followed by subsequent authors.

The species differs from other species in the smooth newt species complex mainly in the male secondary characters during breeding season. The dorsal crest in males reaches 1 mm or more in height and has an almost spine-shaped denticulation. The tail gradually elongates into a fine thread but has no distinct filament. The body is slightly square-shaped but has no dorso-lateral folds. Toe flaps are moderately developed.

Paedomorphic adults have been recorded for the Caucasian smooth newt.

The species's conservation status has not yet been evaluated separately from the smooth newt by the IUCN. Since its range is much smaller than that of the smooth newt species complex as a whole, it is likely to be more vulnerable than previously estimated. In Armenia, Azerbaijan and northeastern Turkey, it is potentially extinct. It is listed in the Red Data Books of Russia and the majority of its North Caucasus provinces and autonomous republics. Destruction of aquatic habitats, deforestation, collection for the pet trade and the introduction of fish were cited as threats.
