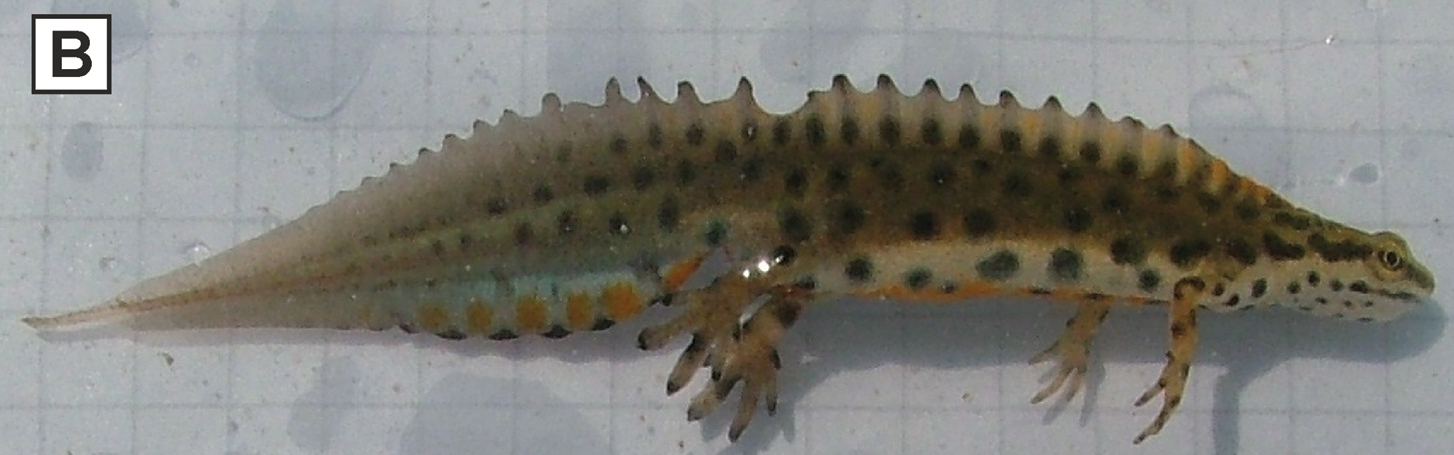
- Male during breeding season

Conservation status
- Least Concern (IUCN 3.1)

Scientific classification
- Kingdom: Animalia
- Phylum: Chordata
- Class: Amphibia
- Order: Urodela
- Family: Salamandridae
- Genus: Lissotriton
- Species: L. schmidtleri

Binomial name
- Lissotriton schmidtleri (Raxworthy, 1988)
- range in the Balkans and in Anatolia; hatching indicates unclear contact zones with L. graecus and L. vulgaris

Synonyms
- Triturus vulgaris schmidtleri Raxworthy, 1988; Triturus vulgaris schmidtlerorum Thorn and Raffaëlli, 2000

= Schmidtler's smooth newt =

Species of amphibian

Schmidtler's smooth newt (Lissotriton schmidtleri) is a newt species found from northwestern Greece and southeast Bulgaria over East Thrace across the Bosphorus to northwest Anatolia. Its range borders that of the smooth newt (L. vulgaris), the Greek smooth newt (L. graecus) and Kosswig's smooth newt (L. kosswigi) to the north, west, and east, respectively.

Christopher Raxworthy described the species in 1988 as Triturus vulgaris schmidtleri, a subspecies of the smooth newt. After genetic data had suggested the smooth newt was a complex of distinct lineages, Pabijan and colleagues recognised Schmidtler's smooth newt as distinct species in 2017. This was followed by subsequent authors.

The species differs from other species in the smooth newt species complex mainly in the male secondary characters during breeding season. It is overall very similar to the smooth newt but rather small, with males reaching 5–7 cm (2.0–2.8 in) length. The dorsal crest reaches 2 mm or more in height and is denticulated. The tail end is elongated but does not have a filament as in the neighbouring Kosswig's smooth newt. The body is slightly square-shaped but has no dorso-lateral folds. Toe flaps are only weakly developed.

Paedomorphic adults have been reported for Schmidtler's smooth newt.

The species is assessed to be of least concern but is faced with an ongoing decline in the extent and quality of its habitat and as such its population is thought to be decreasing. Since its range is much smaller than that of the smooth newt species complex as a whole, it is likely to be more vulnerable than previously estimated.
