= Lake Sassano =

Karstic lake in Apulia, Italy

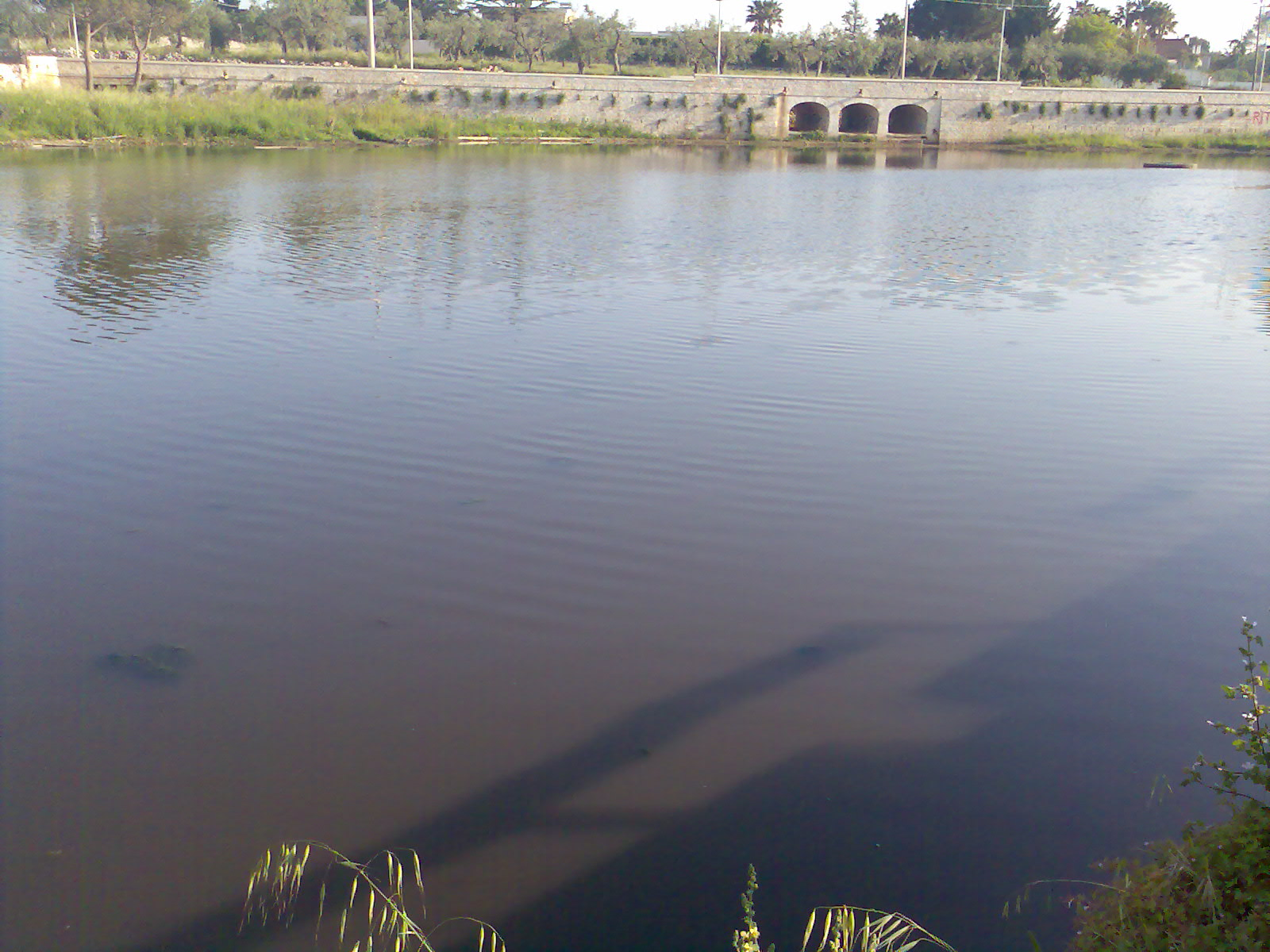

- Location within Italy
- Location: Conversano, Metropolitan City of Bari, Apulia, Italy
- Coordinates: 40.9688°N 17.0972°E
- Type: Karstic
- Basin countries: Italy
- Surface area: 0.005 km^{2} (0.0019 sq mi)
- Max. depth: 2.5 m (8 ft 2 in)
- Surface elevation: 182 m (597 ft)

The Lake Sassano is a karstic doline of the Metropolitan City of Bari, in the territory of Conversano. It is located at 182 m a.s.l. west of the town center, in the district named after it.

The proximity to the town, in an area otherwise lacking surface watercourses, has long favored human activity in the doline’s habitat, which today appears as a water body that only in the driest years becomes an ephemeral lake. Likely as early as pre-Roman times, during the Apulian settlement of Norba apula, and certainly by at least the 18th century, cisterns made of stone lined with clay mortar were constructed at the bottom of the doline to promote the retention of runoff water. The use of the reservoir for potable and irrigation purposes continued until the construction of the Acquedotto Pugliese in the early 20th century. In more recent times, the openings of the 31 surviving cisterns have been partially protected for safety reasons.

Since 2006, Lake Sassano has been part of the Riserva naturale regionale orientata dei Laghi di Conversano e Gravina di Monsignore.

== Fauna ==
Like the other water bodies within the Conversano Lakes Nature Reserve, Lake Sassano is a preferred habitat for numerous amphibian species, among which the Italian newt (Lissotriton italicus) and the green toad (Bufotes viridis) stand out, and reptiles, such as the whip snake (Hierophis viridiflavus), the grass snake (Natrix natrix), the four-lined snake (Elaphe quatuorlineata), the leopard snake (Zamenis situla), the common gecko (Tarentola mauritanica), the Kotschy’s gecko (Cyrtopodion kotschyi), and the western green lizard (Lacerta bilineata).

Among insects, the southern festoon (Zerynthia polyxena) stands out for its vibrant coloration.

Along the lake’s shores, the presence of numerous bird species is not uncommon: among raptors, notable mentions include the lesser kestrel (Falco naumanni), the common kestrel (Falco tinnunculus), the common buzzard (Buteo buteo), the sparrowhawk (Accipiter nisus), as well as nocturnal raptors such as the barn owl (Tyto alba), the little owl (Athene noctua), and the long-eared owl (Asio otus), alongside passerines like the blackcap (Sylvia atricapilla) and the European robin (Erithacus rubecola), and corvids such as the Eurasian jay (Garrulus glandarius). Peculiar is the presence of wetland-associated birds such as the grey heron (Ardea cinerea), the black-winged stilt (Himantopus himantopus), the common moorhen (Gallinula chloropus), the little egret (Egretta garzetta), the wood sandpiper (Tringa glareola), and the squacco heron (Ardeola ralloides).

The most observable mammals in the lake’s surroundings are the red fox (Vulpes vulpes) and the European hedgehog (Erinaceus europaeus), while sightings of least weasels (Mustela nivalis) and stone martens (Martes foina) are less frequent.
