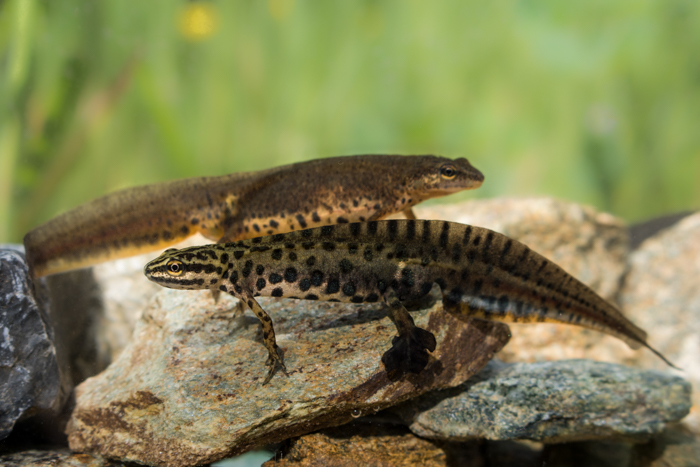
- Female (background) and male during breeding season

Conservation status
- Least Concern (IUCN 3.1)

Scientific classification
- Kingdom: Animalia
- Phylum: Chordata
- Class: Amphibia
- Order: Urodela
- Family: Salamandridae
- Genus: Lissotriton
- Species: L. graecus

Binomial name
- Lissotriton graecus (Wolterstorff, 1906)
- Range (hatching indicates unclear contact zones with L. vulgaris and L. schmidtleri)

Synonyms
- 15 synonyms: Triton vulgaris graeca Wolterstorff, 1906; Triton vulgaris intermedia Kolombatovic, 1907; Triton vulgaris graeca forma tomasinii Wolterstorff, 1908; Triton vulgaris graeca forma corcyrensis Wolterstorff, 1908; Triton meridionalis var. graeca Schreiber, 1912; Triton vulgaris graeca Wolterstorff, 1912; Triton meridionalis var. graeca forma tomasinii Schreiber, 1912; Triton vulgaris forma schreiberi Wolterstorff, 1914; Triton vulgaris forma schreiberi Wolterstorff, 1925; Triton (Palaeotriton) vulgaris graecus Bolkay, 1927; Triturus vulgaris graecus Mertens and Müller, 1928; Triturus vulgaris tomasinii Mertens and Müller, 1928; Triturus vulgaris schreiberi Mertens and Müller, 1940; Triturus meridionalis graeca Bodenheimer, 1944; Lissotriton (Lissotriton) (vulgaris) graecus Dubois and Raffaëlli, 2009

= Greek smooth newt =

Species of amphibian

The Greek smooth newt or Greek newt (Lissotriton graecus) is a newt species found in the southern Balkans, from southern Croatia (Dalmatia) over Montenegro, Albania and North Macedonia to Greece and south-westernmost Bulgaria. An introduced population exists in Austria, close to Vienna.

== Taxonomy ==
Willy Wolterstorff described the species in 1906 as Triton vulgaris graeca, a subspecies of the smooth newt. After genetic data had suggested the smooth newt was a complex of distinct lineages, Dubois and Raffaëlli, in 2009, recognised several subspecies, including the Greek smooth newt, as distinct species. This was followed by subsequent authors. Molecular phylogenetics suggested that the closest relative of the Greek smooth newt is Kosswig's smooth newt (Lissotriton kosswigi) from northwestern Anatolia.

== Description ==
The species differs from other species in the smooth newt species complex mainly in the male secondary characters during breeding season. The male dorsal crest is less than 1 mm high and has smooth edges. The belly has many small spots, but the lower tail fin is usually unspotted. The well-developed dorso-lateral folds give the body a square shape. Toe flaps on the hind feet are well developed.

== Conservation status ==
It is assessed as Least Concern globally in view of its wide distribution, presumed large population, and supposed tolerance of a broad range of habitats. However, there is evidence that, in some large parts of the range, it is declining fast due to anthropogenic alterations (pollution, drying out of its habitat due to climate change, destruction of its habitat for commercial and touristic development, introduction of alien species, etc.). The species has been negatively impacted by the introduction of fish, particularly in the northern part of its range in Montenegro.
