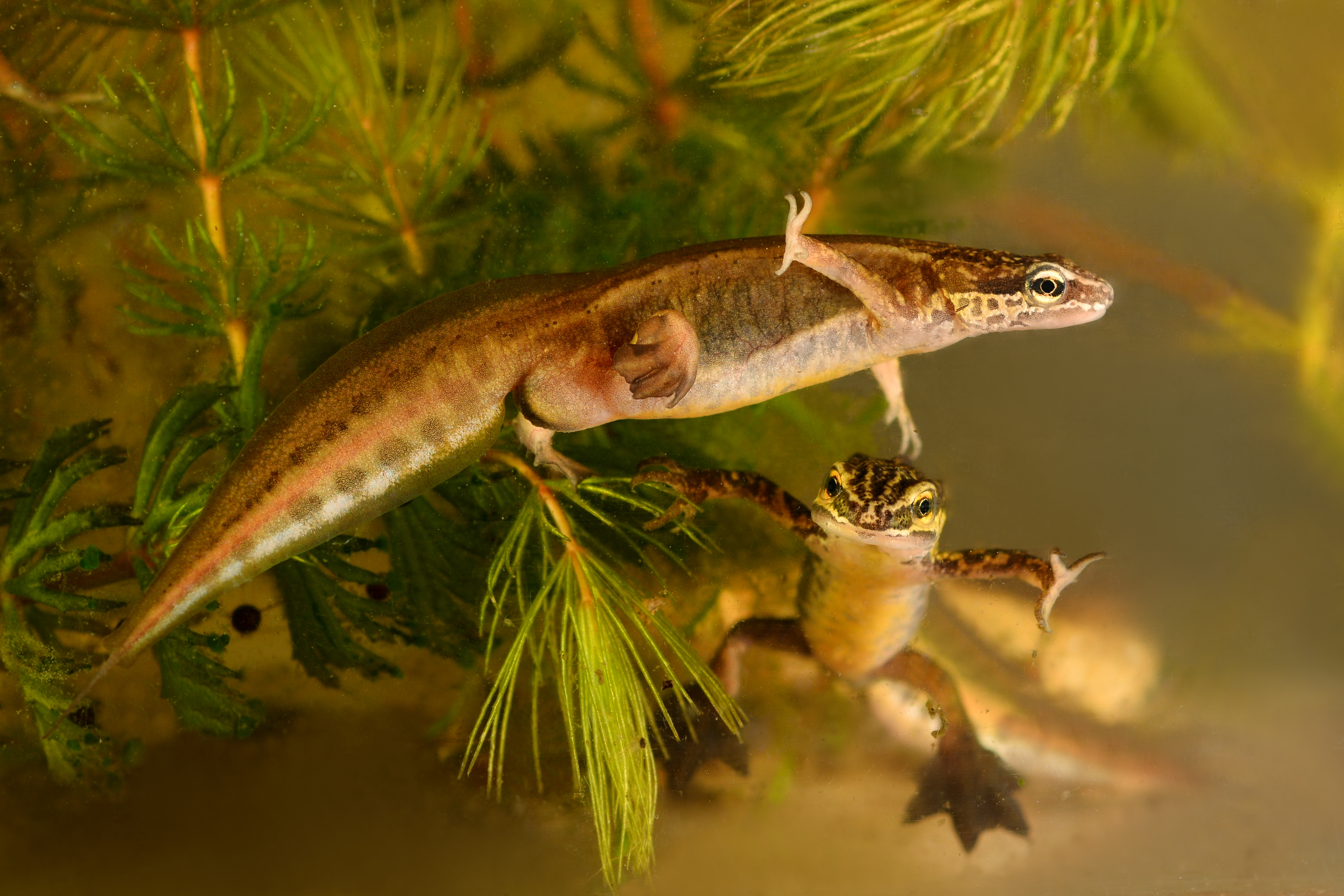
- Two breeding males

Conservation status
- Least Concern (IUCN 3.1)

Scientific classification
- Kingdom: Animalia
- Phylum: Chordata
- Class: Amphibia
- Order: Urodela
- Family: Salamandridae
- Genus: Lissotriton
- Species: L. helveticus

Binomial name
- Lissotriton helveticus (Razoumovsky, 1789)
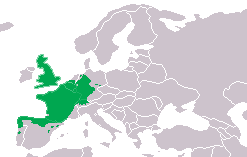

Synonyms
- 33 synonyms, including: Lacerta helvetica Razoumovsky, 1789; Lacerta paradoxa Razoumovsky, 1789; Molge palmata Merrem, 1820; Triton palmatus Millet de la Turtaudière, 1828; Lissotriton palmipes Bell, 1839; Triturus helveticus Dunn, 1918

= Palmate newt =

Species of amphibian

The palmate newt (Lissotriton helveticus) is a species of newt found in Western Europe, from Great Britain to the northern Iberian Peninsula. It is 5–9.5 cm (2.0–3.7 in) long and olive or brown with some dark spots. The underside is yellow to orange, and the throat, unlike in the similar smooth newt, always unspotted. A dark stripe runs along the head and through the eyes. Breeding males develop a distinct filament on the end of their tail, strongly webbed hind feet, and a low, smooth crest on their back.

Habitats include forests, marshes, pastures or gardens. While on land, the newts are mainly nocturnal. After emerging from hibernation in spring, they move to stagnant, fish-free bodies of water for breeding. Following a courtship display, the male deposits a spermatophore that is picked up by the female. Larvae develop over after 1.5–3.5 months before metamorphosing into land-dwelling juveniles (efts). Sexual maturity is reached after two to three years, and the newts can live up to 12 years in the wild. The species is generally common and has been assessed as Least Concern by the IUCN.

== Taxonomy ==
The palmate newt was first scientifically described in 1789 by Russian naturalist Grigory Razumovsky. He placed it in the genus of the green lizards and named it Lacerta helvetica, with "helvetica" referring to the Swiss type locality in the canton of Vaud. He also gave Lacerta paradoxa as alternative name, which is now regarded as a junior synonym. Several names published in different genera over time are also now treated as synonyms for the palmate newt. Most recently, the species was included in the genus Triturus, along with most European newts. This genus however was found to be polyphyletic, containing several unrelated lineages, and the small-bodied newts, including the palmate newt, were therefore split off as separate genus in 2004 by García-París and colleagues. They used the genus name Lissotriton, introduced by the English zoologist Thomas Bell in 1839. Two distinct subspecies, L. h. alonsoi and L. h. punctillatus, were described from the Iberian Peninsula, but have not been retained by Raffaëlli and Sparreboom.

== Description ==
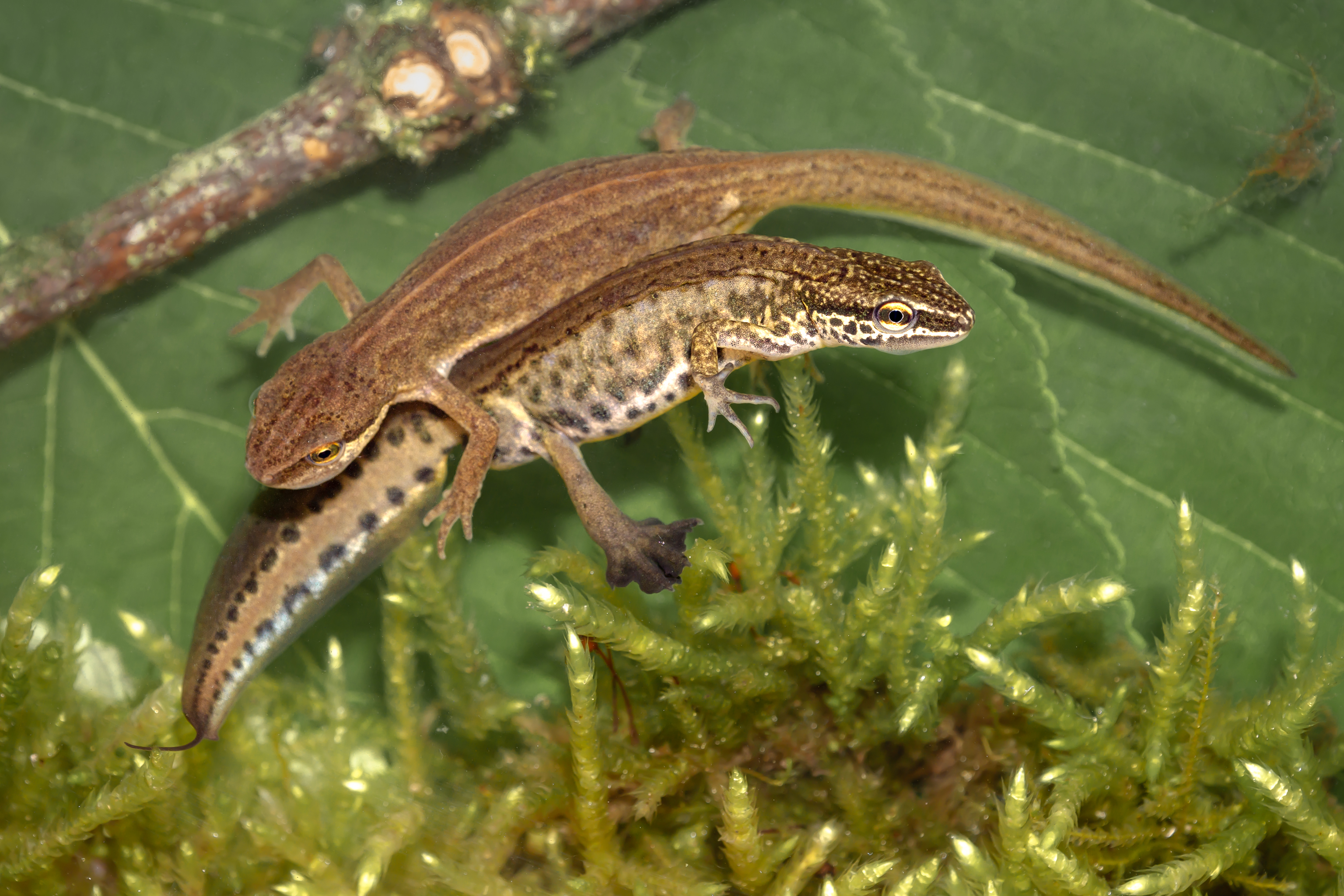
Female (top) and male (bottom) of the palmate newt (Lissotriton helveticus)

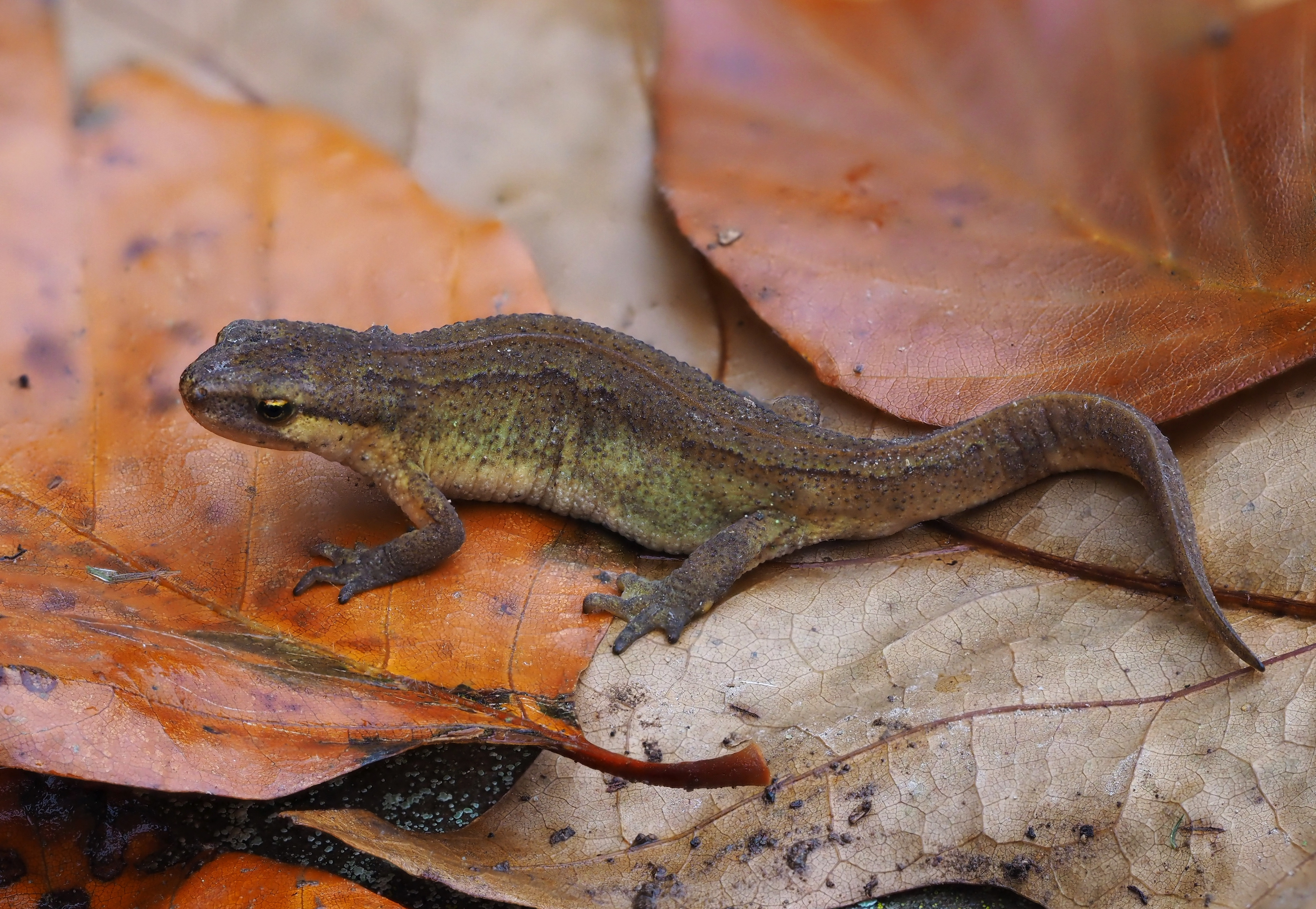
Male during land phase, with dry, velvety skin

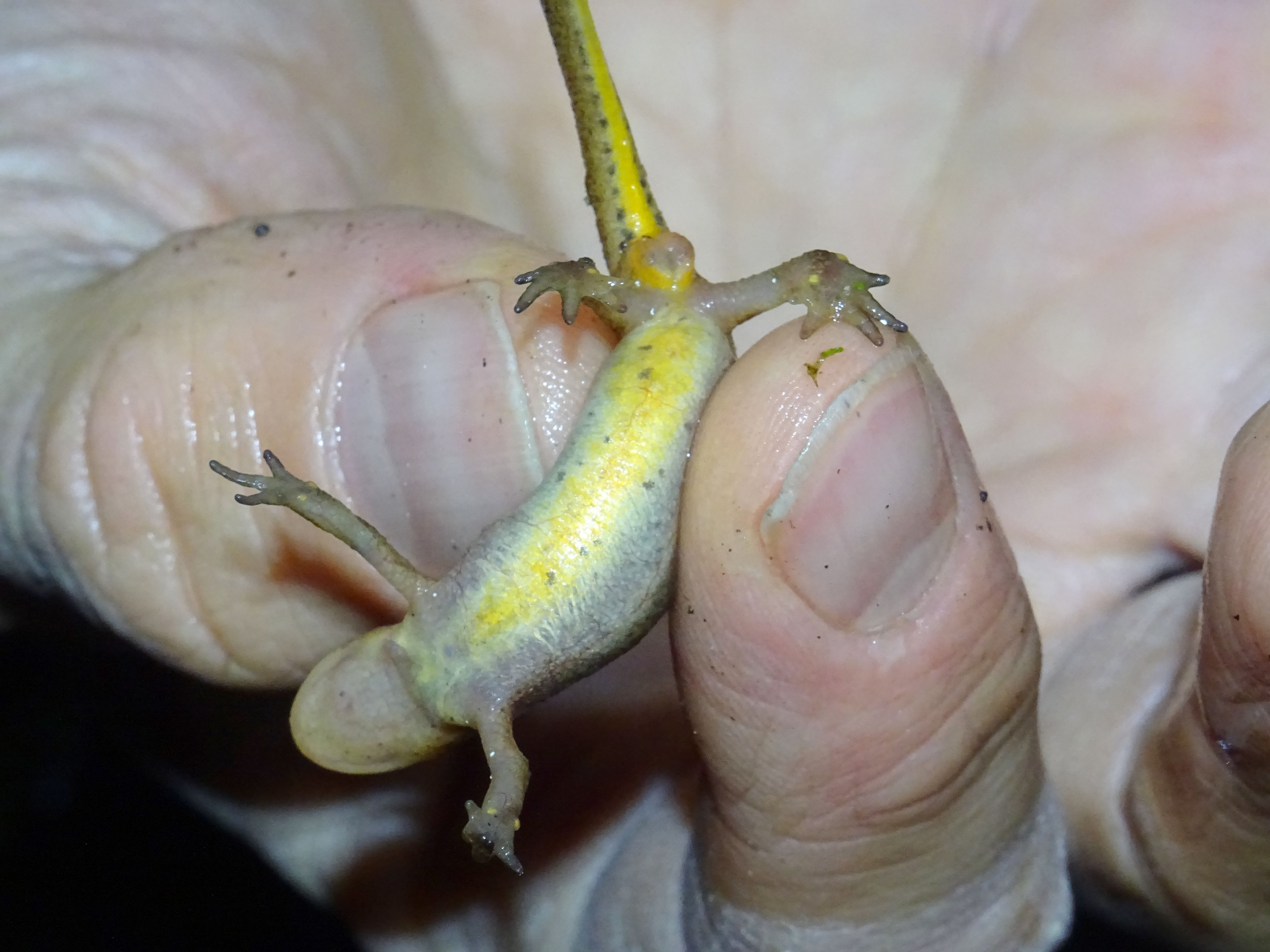
The underside is yellow to orange, and the throat always unspotted.

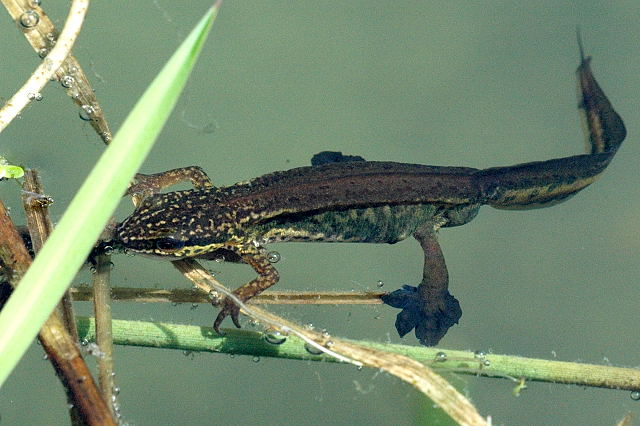
Breeding male with angular body, low smooth crest, tail filament and webbed hind feet

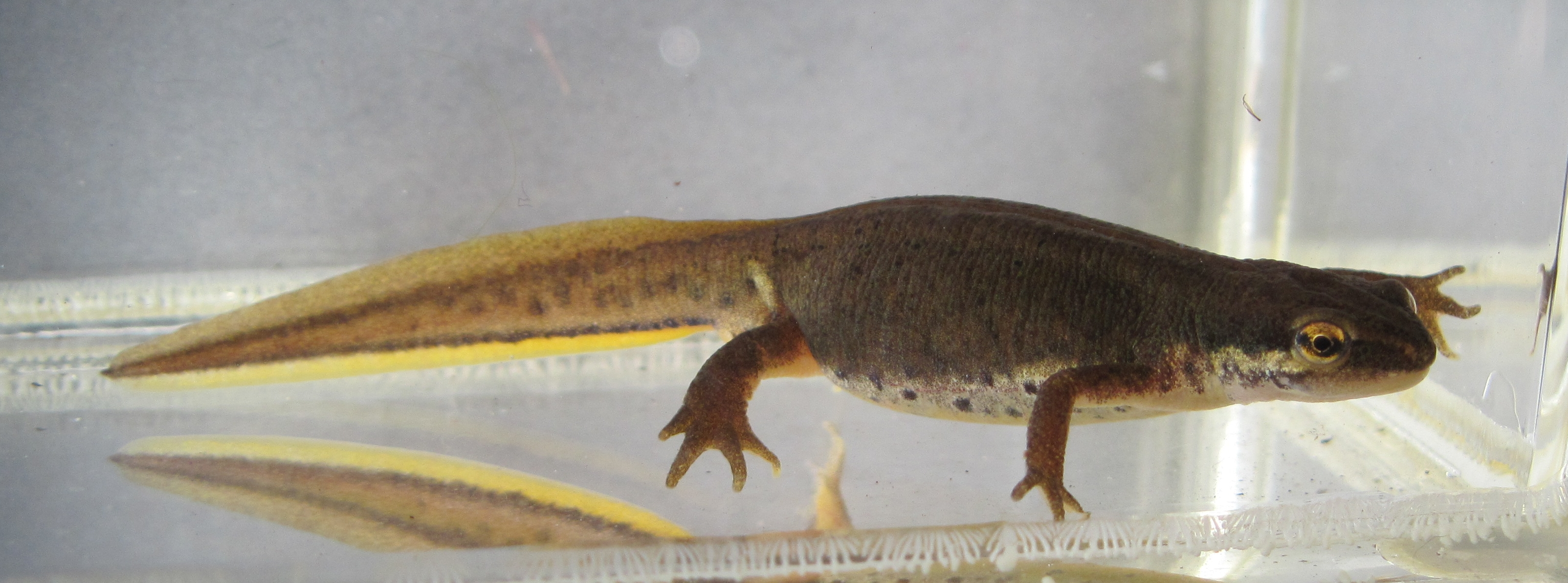
Breeding female with orange strip on tail but without tail filament

Palmate newts grow to a total length of about 5–8.5 cm (2.0–3.3 in) total length in males, while females are somewhat larger and can reach 9.5 cm (3.7 in). The tail is slightly shorter than the snout–vent distance. The head is longer than it is wide and has three longitudinal grooves on the snout. Both sexes have an olive or brown base colour, and males and some females have dark spotting on their backs. In females, these spots can sometimes form two irregular lines, and they may have a red stripe running along their back while living on land. In both sexes, a dark stripe runs along the head through the eyes. The underside is yellow or light orange and more whitish on the sides; the belly can have some dark spots, while the throat is always unspotted. The skin is dry and velvety while the newts live on land, but it becomes smooth when they migrate into water.

Males can be distinguished from females by the larger and darker-coloured cloaca. During the aquatic breeding season, the cloaca swells, and other sexual differences develop: Males grow a low, smooth skin seam (a crest) on their back, which is higher on the tail. Their tail has a blunt end with a distinct, 4–7 mm long filament. They also have ridges (dorso-lateral ridges) running along their sides, giving them an angular, square shape in cross-section, and their hind feet have well-developed, dark webbing. The lower half of the tail is blue in breeding males and orange in females. Development of the crest, tail filament, ridges, and webbing can be suppressed in the presence of the newts' natural predators. When exposed to predatory goldfish, newts do not express these traits, as large sexual ornaments would make them more conspicuous prey. Females do not develop a crest, tail filament or webbed feet.

Sometimes confused with the smooth newt (Lissotriton vulgaris) which is found in much of the same area, the palmate newt can be distinguished by its unspotted throat. It also resembles Boscá's newt (L. boscai) from the Iberian peninsula, which has only a single groove on the snout and no dark eye strip.

== Distribution and habitats ==
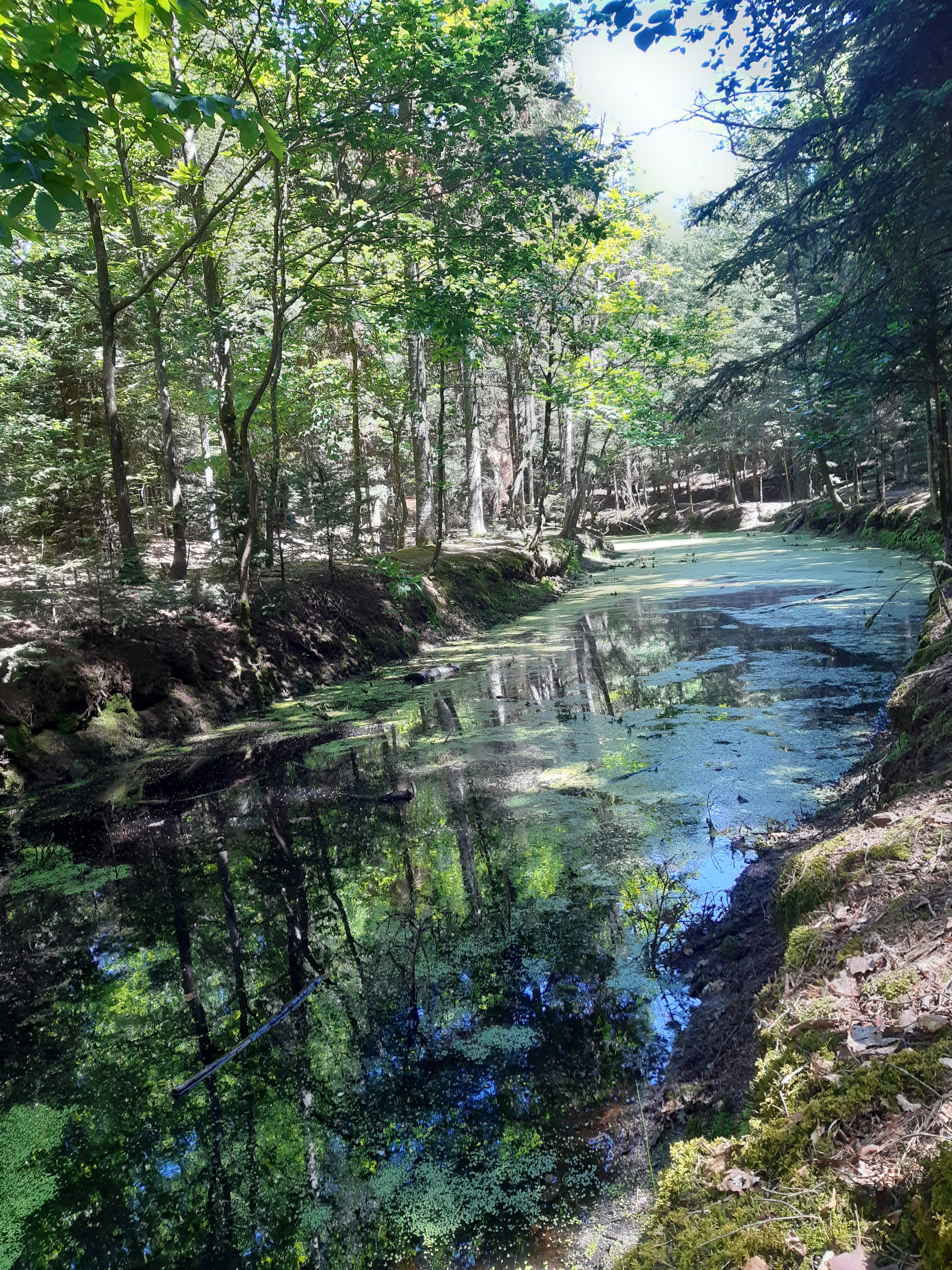
Forest pond, breeding site for the palmate and the alpine newt

The palmate newt is found across Western Europe, from Great Britain (including Scotland) to northern Portugal and Spain. In the east, it ranges to the Elbe river in Germany and the Czech Republic and the lower and mid Alps in Switzerland. It is most common from 500–1,500 m (1,600–4,900 ft) elevation, but can be found from sea level up to 2,500 m (8,200 ft) (in the Pyrenees). Genetic analyses by Recuero and García-París suggest that the species was confined to the Iberian Peninsula during the Last Glacial Maximum and then expanded its range north of the Pyrenees.

They were recently discovered in South Western Ireland, but it is unclear yet whether they are native or introduced to this region.

The palmate newt is common over much of its range and is found in a variety of habitats, including forests, marshes and pastures. It is less abundant in cultivated areas, but it can adapt to gardens. For reproduction, newts tolerate different types of stagnant water bodies, preferably fish-free, acidic ponds. The smooth newt has a similar distribution, but in France it appears to prefer ponds in open land, whereas the palmate newt prefers forest ponds. Hybrids between the two species are rare.

== Lifecycle and reproduction ==
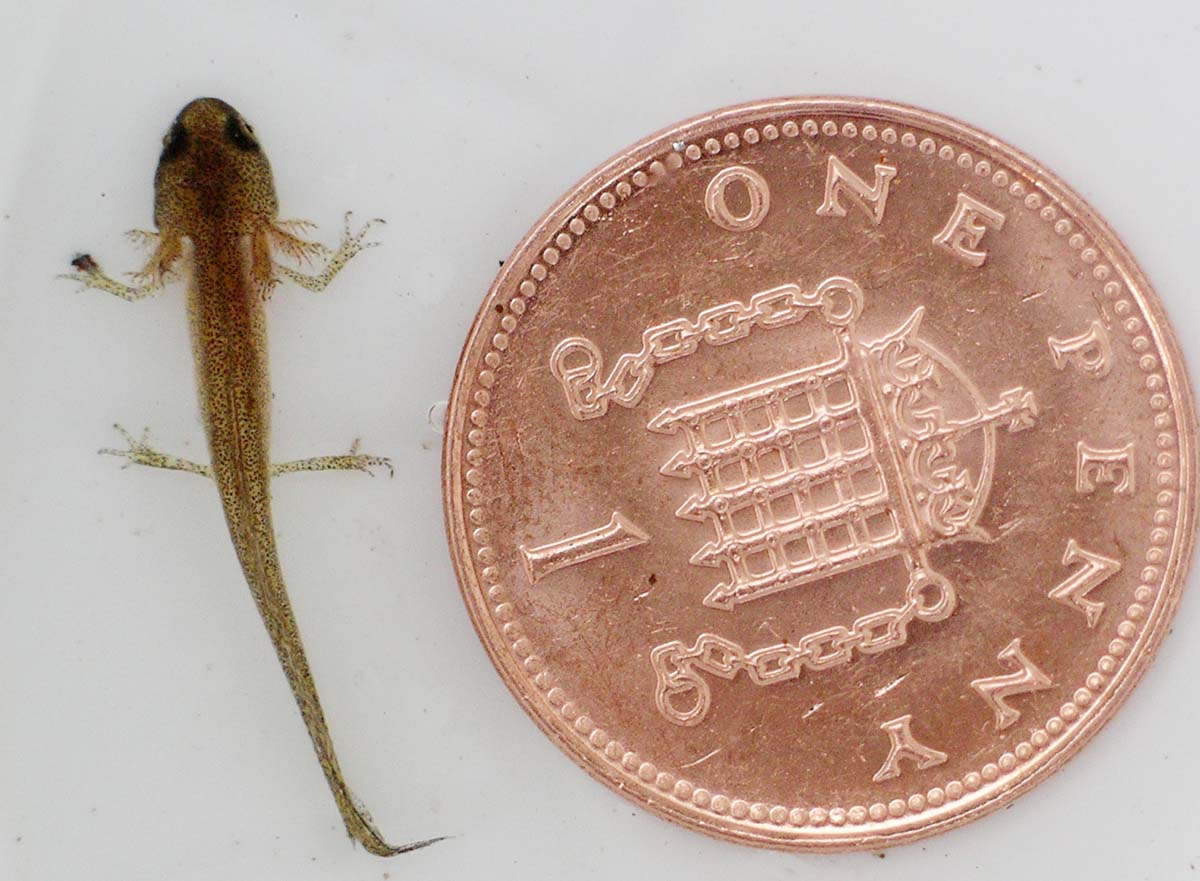
Larva with fore- and hind legs developed, with a British penny (20.3 mm) for scale

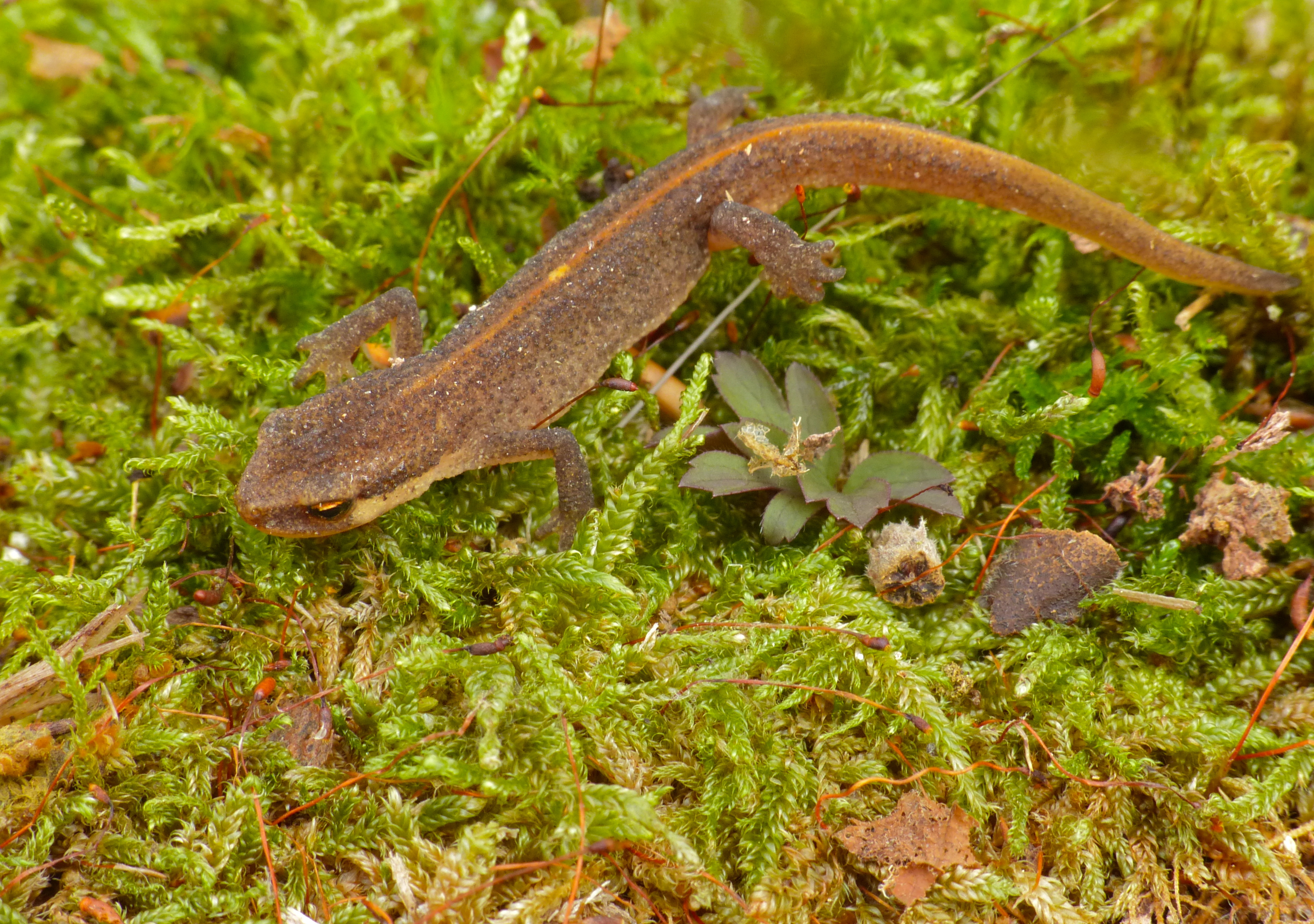
Juvenile (eft) after the transition to land

The reproductive period usually extends from February to May, but it can start earlier or last longer in the southern part of the Iberian Peninsula, depending on elevation. The newts can use magnetoreception over larger distances and the calls of frogs over shorter distances to find their breeding ponds. Once in the water, they are active during day and night. Breeding involves a ritualised courtship display, as observed in other closely related newts: The male attempts to attract a female by swimming in front of her and sniffing her cloaca. He then vibrates his tail against his body, sometimes lashing it (but less violently than in the smooth newt), thereby fanning pheromones towards her. In the final phase, its a packet of sperm (a spermatophore). He then guides her over the spermatophore so she picks it up with her cloaca.

The females lays 150–440 eggs individually on the leaves of aquatic plants. These are 1.3–1.8 mm in diameter (2.2–3 mm with capsule) and very similar to those of the smooth newt. Larvae hatch after 8–21 days, depending on temperature, at a size of 8–14 mm. The young larvae are yellow–brown, with two black stripes, and have two appendages (balancers) on the sides of the head, which are later resorbed. The colour then becomes more cryptic, and the larvae grow to 3–4 cm (1.2–1.6 in). As they grow, their characteristics are affected by their environment. Specifically, in response to chemical cues from predatory dragonfly larvae, larval newts develop larger heads and tails, and develop darker tail pigmentation. Additionally, dragonflies were more likely to prey on newts without such changes, which may be because a larger tail size facilitates newt predator escape behavior. They metamorphose into land-dwelling juveniles (efts) after 1.5–3.5 months, but some larvae instead overwinter in water. Paedomorphism, where adults keep their gills and stay aquatic, is also known.

The efts live on land until they reach maturity in their second or third year. They are mainly active on land during humid nights. The palmate newt usually hibernates on land, but sometimes in the water, and in the Iberian peninsula, it is often active year-round. Larvae, efts and adults mainly feed on various invertebrates, but cannibalism also occurs, mainly by larvae preying on eggs. An age of up to 12 years can be reached in the wild.

== Threats and conservation ==
Overall, palmate newt populations are not in decline, and the species has been assessed as Least Concern by the IUCN. It is the most common newt species in France, but rare in Belgium and the Netherlands, and its populations are fragmented on the Iberian Peninsula. It is included in some national and regional red lists. Drainage and pollution of breeding sites, the introduction of fish and crayfish, as well as desertification (in the southern range), have been cited as threats. Like all amphibians, it is listed as protected species in the Berne Convention (Appendix III), and it is legally protected by law in the countries it occurs in.
