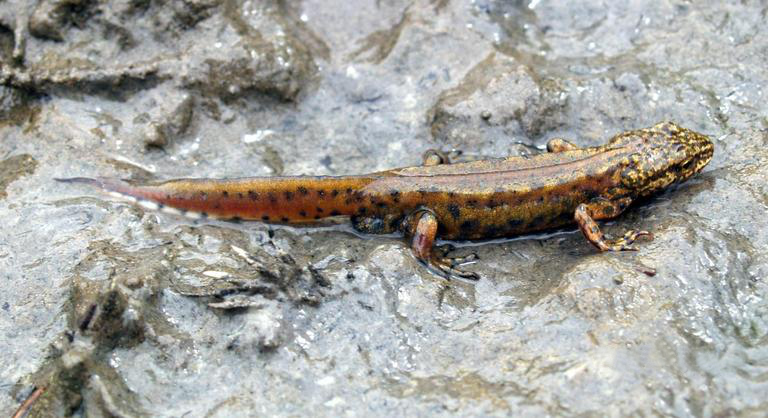

Conservation status
- Least Concern (IUCN 3.1)

Scientific classification
- Kingdom: Animalia
- Phylum: Chordata
- Class: Amphibia
- Order: Urodela
- Family: Salamandridae
- Genus: Lissotriton
- Species: L. montandoni

Binomial name
- Lissotriton montandoni (Boulenger, 1860)
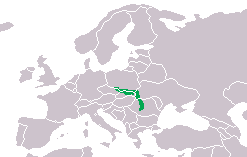

Synonyms
- Triton montandoni Boulenger, 1880; Molge montandonii Boulenger, 1882; Triton montandoni Wolterstorff, 1912; Diemictylus montandoni Fowler & Dunn, 1917; Triturus montandoni Dunn, 1918; Triturus (Palaeotriton) montandoni Bolkay, 1927; Triton hoffmanni Szeliga-Mierzeyewksi & Ulasiewicz, 1931; Triturus montandoni Wolterstorff & Herre, 1935; Triturus (Palaeotriton) montandoni MacGregor, Sessions & Arntzen, 1990; Lissotriton montandoni García-París, Montori & Herrero, 2004; Lophinus montandoni Litvinchuk, Zuiderwijk, Borkin & Rosanov, 2005

= Carpathian newt =

Species of salamander

The Carpathian newt, or Montandon's newt, (Lissotriton montandoni) is a species of salamander in the family Salamandridae found in Czech Republic, Poland, Romania, Slovakia, and Ukraine.

The total length of adults of this species is around 10 cm. Its natural habitats are temperate forests, rivers, intermittent rivers, freshwater marshes, intermittent freshwater marshes, arable land, pastureland, rural gardens, and ponds. It is threatened by habitat loss.

== Description ==
The Carpathian newt grows to a total length of about 10 cm (4 in), females in general being larger than males. The skin is granulated in terrestrial individuals but smoother in more aquatic ones. There are three grooves on the head and the body is very square in cross section. The upper surface is yellowish-brown or olive-brown, copiously mottled with fine dark spots. The underparts are yellow or orange, often with small black spots at the sides. The lower part of the tail is white or orange with large black spots. In the breeding season, males have a slight crest on the tail and a filament on the tip, but only a slightly-raised ridge along the back.

== Distribution and habitat ==
The Carpathian newt is native to the eastern part of the Carpathian Mountains and the eastern part of the Sudetes Mountains where it is found at altitudes of up to about 2,000 m (6,562 ft) above sea level. It has been introduced into the Bavarian Forest in Germany. Where their ranges overlap, it often hybridises with the smooth newt (Lissotriton vulgaris), the offspring being intermediate in appearance between the two species. The Carpathian newt prefers wet, shady woodland, both coniferous and broadleaf, glades, woodland edges and upland pastures. It is able to adapt to some extent to degraded habitats, and it breeds in permanent and temporary bodies of water.

== Behaviour ==
The Carpathian newt often lives near the places where it breeds, hiding under fallen trees, rocks and loose bark. Breeding starts in the spring and the female lays up to 250 eggs during the year. The chosen sites are ponds, pools, ditches, water-filled wheel ruts, marshes and the edges of lakes. Dark, cold acid water is preferred but polluted water is sometimes used. The eggs hatch in one to four weeks according to temperature, and metamorphosis may occur at twelve weeks, but at higher altitudes, the tadpoles may overwinter. Sexual maturity is reached at about three years.

== Status ==
Although the total population of the Carpathian newt is probably declining, the International Union for Conservation of Nature has assessed it as being of "least concern" in view of its wide range, presumed large total population and tolerance to variations to its habitat.
