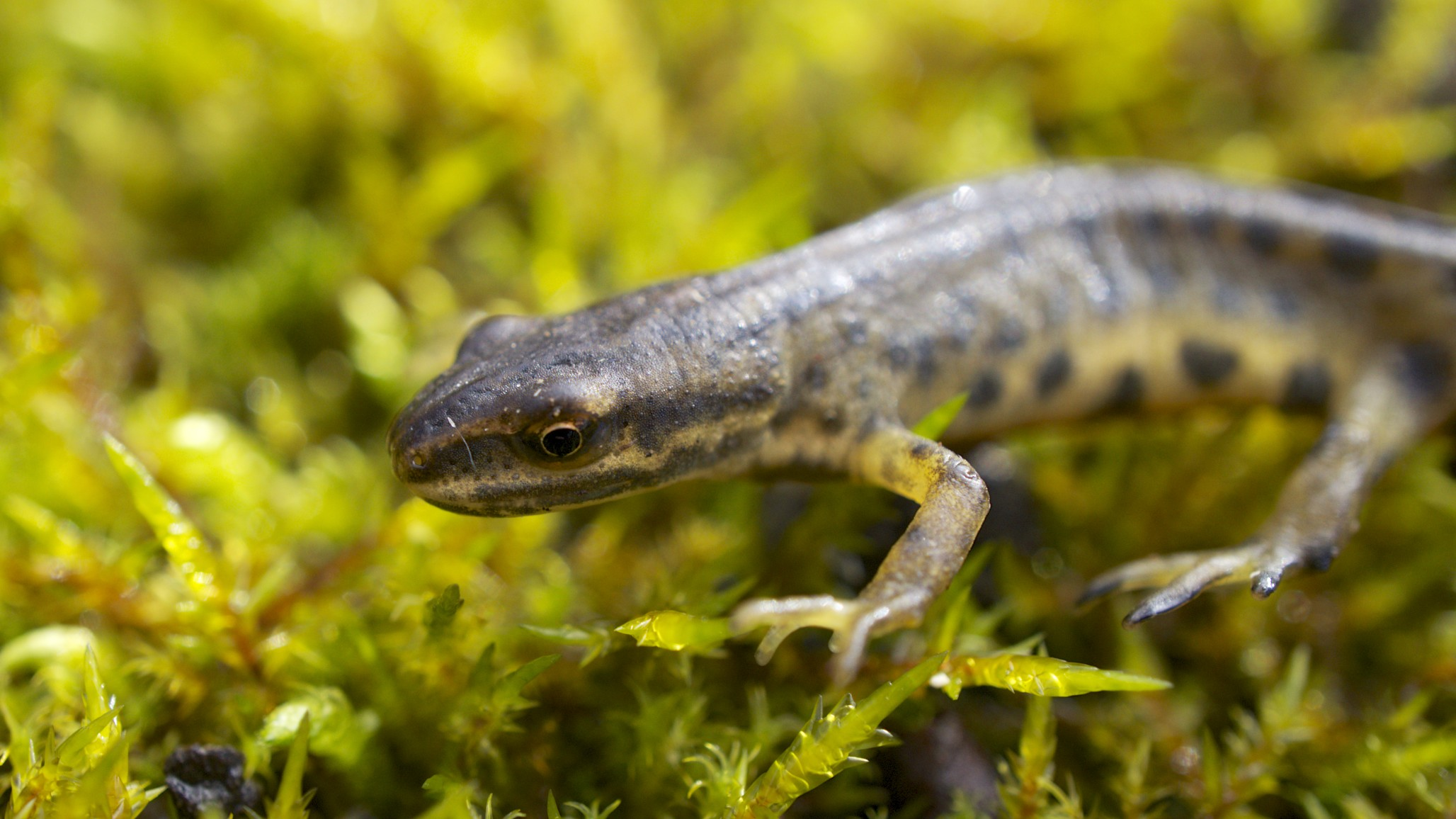
- Lissotriton vulgaris (smooth newt)

Scientific classification
- Kingdom: Animalia
- Phylum: Chordata
- Class: Amphibia
- Order: Urodela
- Family: Salamandridae
- Subfamily: Pleurodelinae
- Genus: Lissotriton; Bell, 1839

Type species
- Lissotriton vulgaris

Synonyms
- Geotriton Bonaparte, 1832; Lophinus Gray, 1850; Meinus Dubois & Raffaëlli, 2009; Meinus Rafinesque, 1815; Palaeotriton Bolkay, 1927; Palmitus Rafinesque, 1815

= Lissotriton =

Genus of amphibians

Lissotriton is a genus of newts native to Europe and parts of Asia Minor. As most other newts, they are aquatic as larvae and during breeding time but live in terrestrial, humid environments over the rest of the season.

These rather small species used to be included in genus Triturus, but phylogenetic analyses demonstrated that genus as paraphyletic. In the following, the name Lissotriton, originally introduced by Thomas Bell in 1839, was reinstated for the small-bodied species related to the type species Lissotriton vulgaris (the smooth newt).

Their exact phylogenetic placement within the newts (subfamily Pleurodelinae) is still uncertain.

== Species ==
Currently, ten species are listed in Amphibian Species of the World – the rank of some of these as species or subspecies is however controversial:

- Lissotriton boscai (Lataste, 1879) – Bosca's newt
- Lissotriton graecus (Wolterstorff, 1906) – Greek newt
- Lissotriton helveticus (Razoumovsky, 1789) – Palmate newt
- Lissotriton italicus (Peracca, 1898) – Italian newt
- Lissotriton kosswigi (Freytag, 1955) – Kosswig's smooth newt
- Lissotriton lantzi (Wolterstorff, 1914) – Caucasian smooth newt
- Lissotriton maltzani (Boettger, 1879) – Portuguese smooth newt
- Lissotriton montandoni (Boulenger, 1880) – Carpathian newt
- Lissotriton schmidtleri (Raxworthy, 1988) – Schmidtler's smooth newt
- Lissotriton vulgaris (Linnaeus, 1758) – Smooth newt

== Phylogeny ==
- - Lissotriton boscai
  - - - Lissotriton italicus
      - Lissotriton helveticus
    - - Lissotriton vulgaris
      - Lissotriton montandoni

Intrinsic phylogenic tree of genus Lissotriton.

== Gallery ==
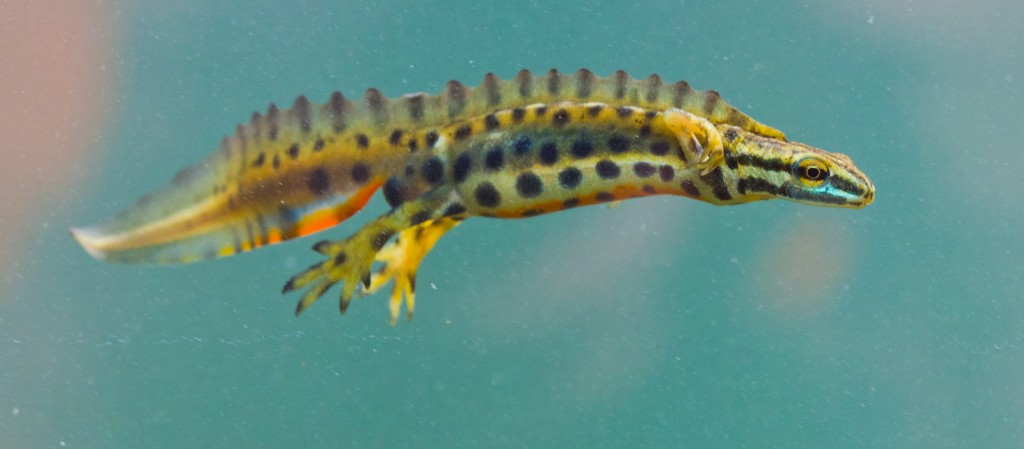
Lissotriton vulgaris, male during breeding time

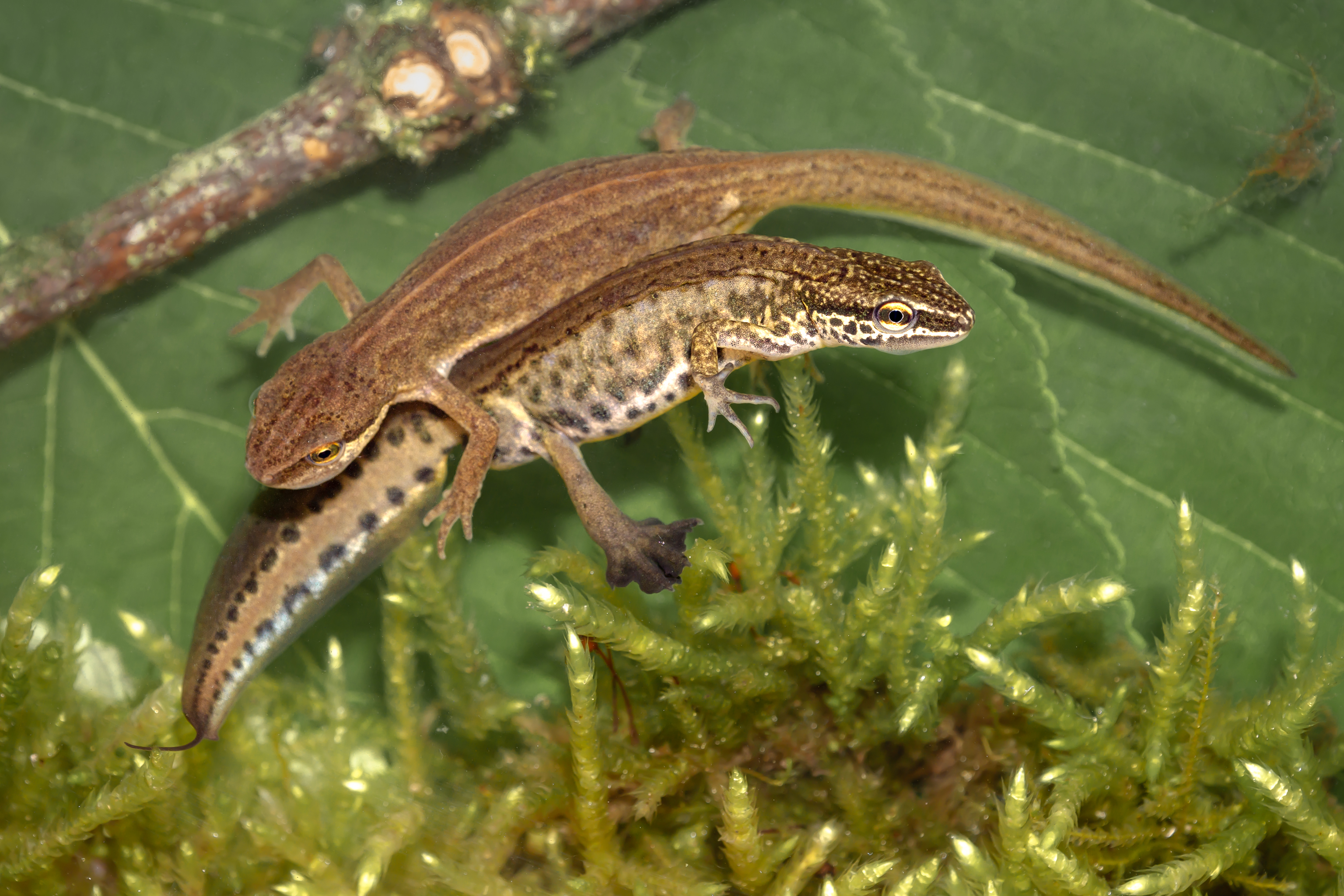
Lissotriton helveticus, female (top) and male (bottom) during breeding season.

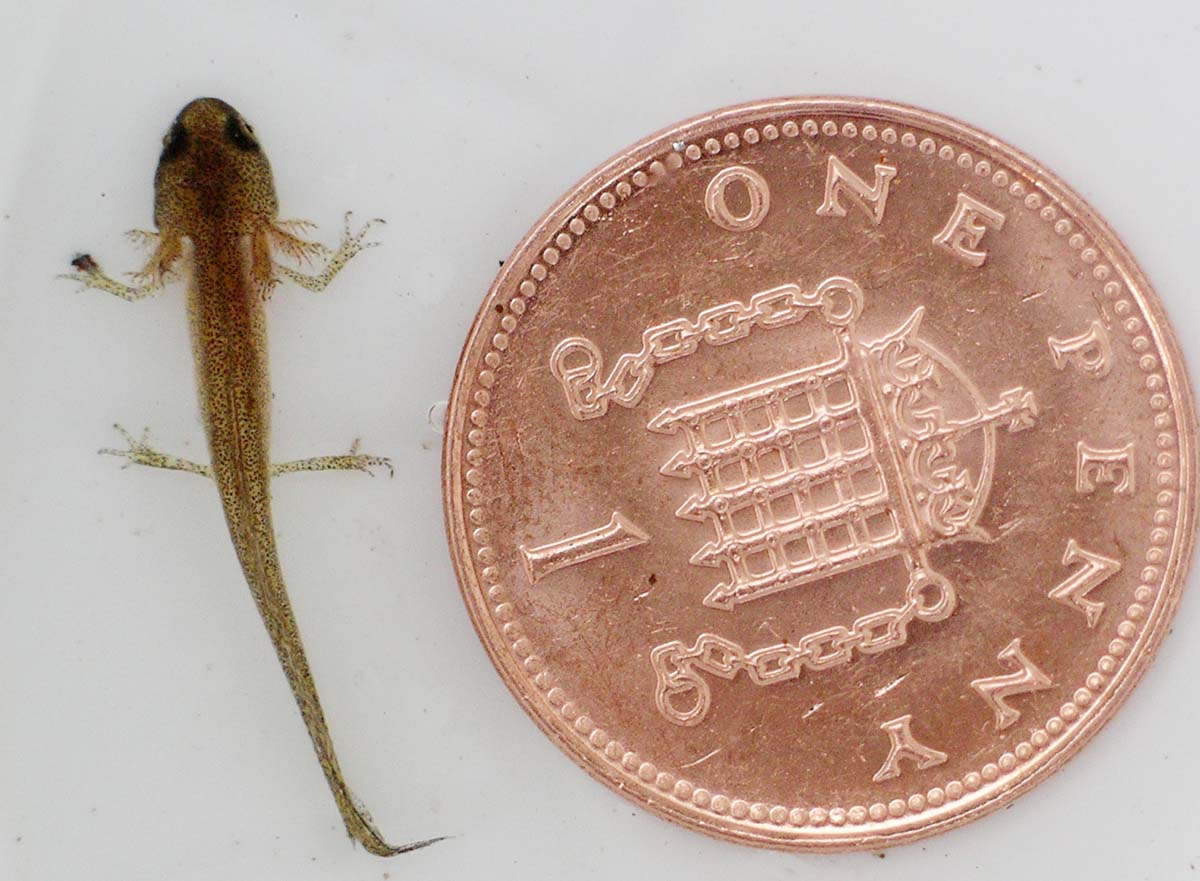
Lissotriton helveticus, larva

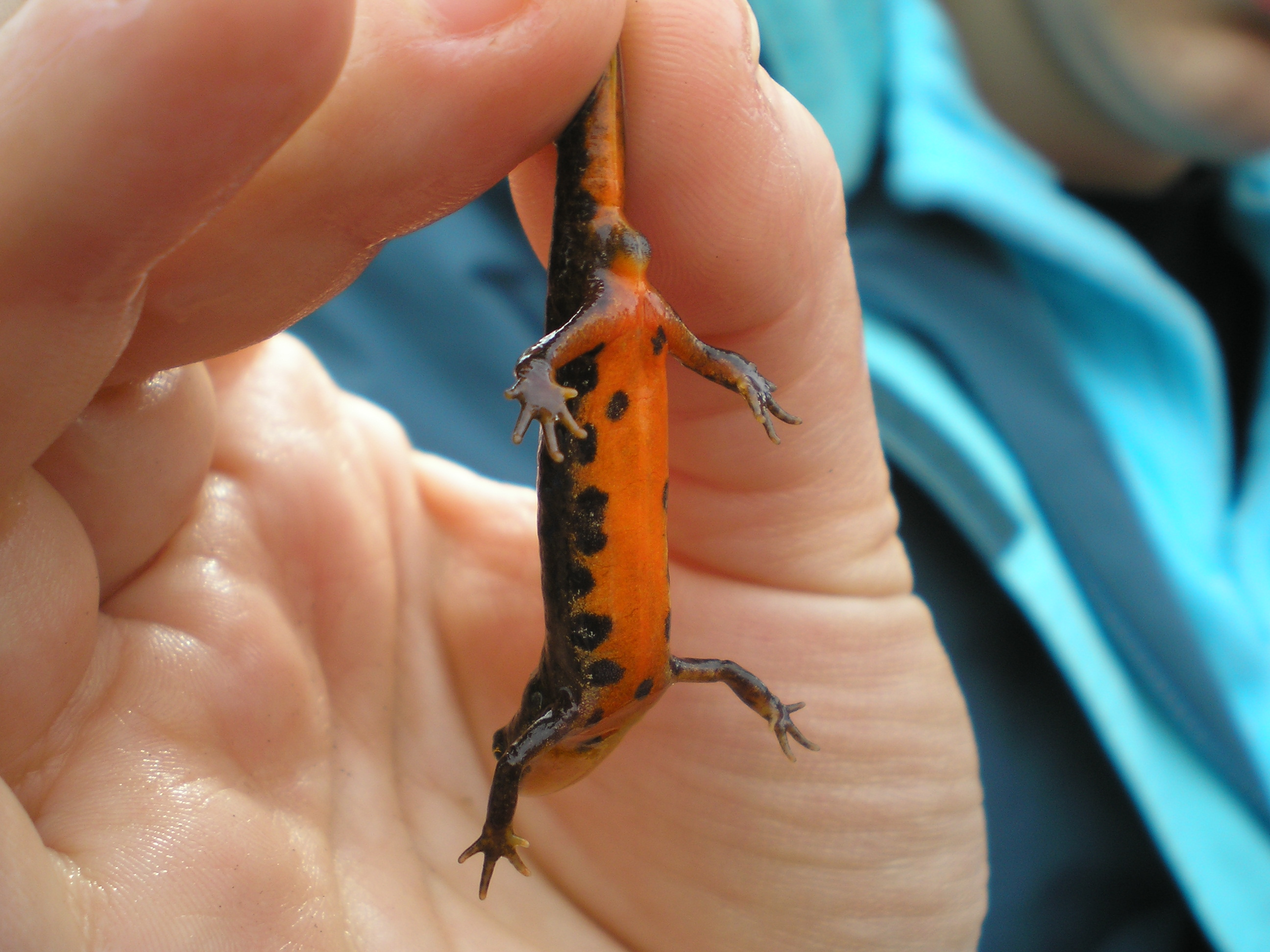
Lissotriton boscai, underside

== Mate selection ==
Female mate choice is an important concept in evolutionary biology because it bears on female and male reproductive success. Experiments were carried out with Lissotriton vulgaris in which female newts were paired sequentially with two males having different degrees of genetic relatedness to the female. It was found that the more genetically dissimilar male had a higher paternity share than the more related male. Female choice may reflect an avoidance of inbreeding with related males that could lead to less fit progeny (inbreeding depression).
