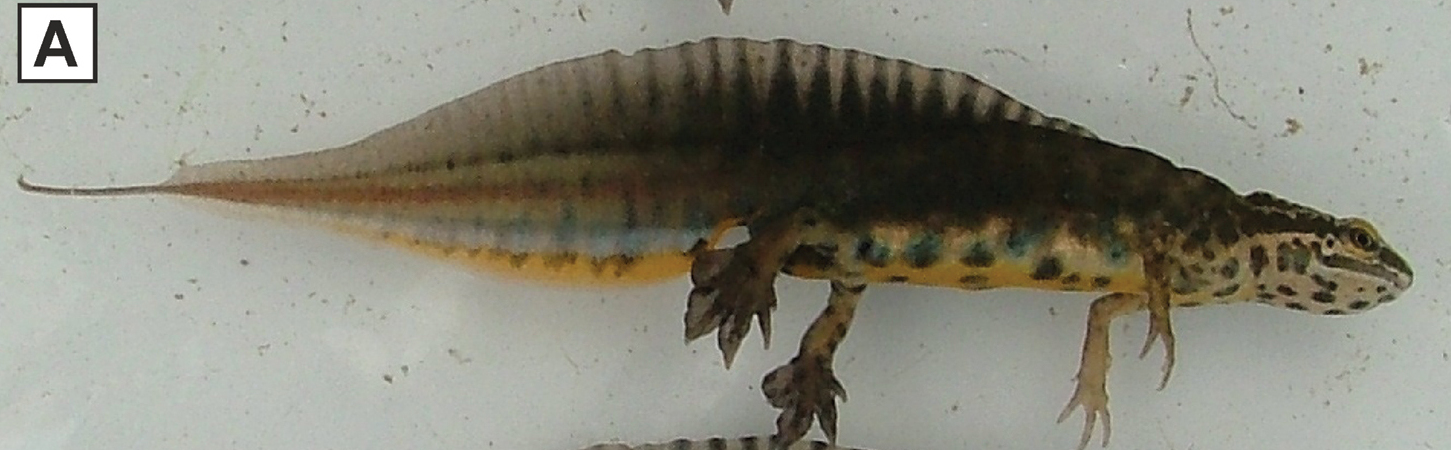
- Male during breeding season

Conservation status
- Vulnerable (IUCN 3.1)

Scientific classification
- Kingdom: Animalia
- Phylum: Chordata
- Class: Amphibia
- Order: Urodela
- Family: Salamandridae
- Genus: Lissotriton
- Species: L. kosswigi

Binomial name
- Lissotriton kosswigi (Freytag, 1955)
- range in northwestern Anatolia

Synonyms
- Triturus vulgaris kosswigi Freytag, 1955

= Kosswig's smooth newt =

Species of amphibian

Kosswig's smooth newt (Lissotriton kosswigi) is a newt species found in northwestern Anatolia, east of the Bosphorus.

Günther Erich Freytag described the species in 1955 as Triturus vulgaris kosswigii, a subspecies of the smooth newt (now Lissotriton vulgaris). After genetic data had suggested the smooth newt was a complex of distinct lineages, Dubois and Raffaëlli, in 2009, recognised several subspecies, including Kosswig's smooth newt, as distinct species. This was followed by subsequent authors. Molecular phylogenetics suggested that the closest relative of Kosswig's smooth newt is the Greek smooth newt (Lissotriton graecus) from the Balkans.

The species differs from other species in the smooth newt species complex mainly in the male secondary characters during breeding season. The male dorsal crest is less than 1 mm high, but high at the tail base, has smooth edges, and ends in a long filament. The well-developed dorso-lateral folds give the body a square shape. The toe flaps are well developed.

Paedomorphic adults have been reported for Kosswig's smooth newt.

Due to a limited range, a fragmented population and a continuous decline to the extent and quality of its habitat, the species is listed as vulnerable.
