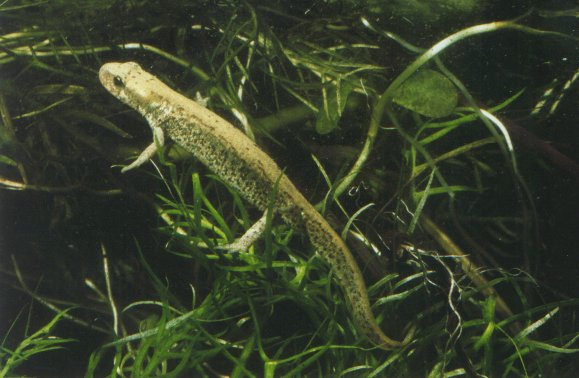

Conservation status
- Least Concern (IUCN 3.1)

Scientific classification
- Kingdom: Animalia
- Phylum: Chordata
- Class: Amphibia
- Order: Urodela
- Family: Salamandridae
- Genus: Lissotriton
- Species: L. italicus

Binomial name
- Lissotriton italicus (Peracca, 1898)

= Italian newt =

Species of salamander

The Italian newt (Lissotriton italicus) is a species of salamander in the family Salamandridae found only in Italy. The species can be found in temperate forests, temperate shrubland, Mediterranean-type shrubby vegetation, freshwater lakes, intermittent freshwater lakes, freshwater marshes, intermittent freshwater marshes, arable land, pastureland, rural gardens, water storage areas, ponds, and canals and ditches. It is threatened by habitat loss, natural land conversion and invasive species. It was formerly known as Triturus italicus, but was relocated to the genus Lissotriton after Triturus was split.

== Population ==
The Italian newt is more common in southern areas, and rarer in the northern parts of Italy.
