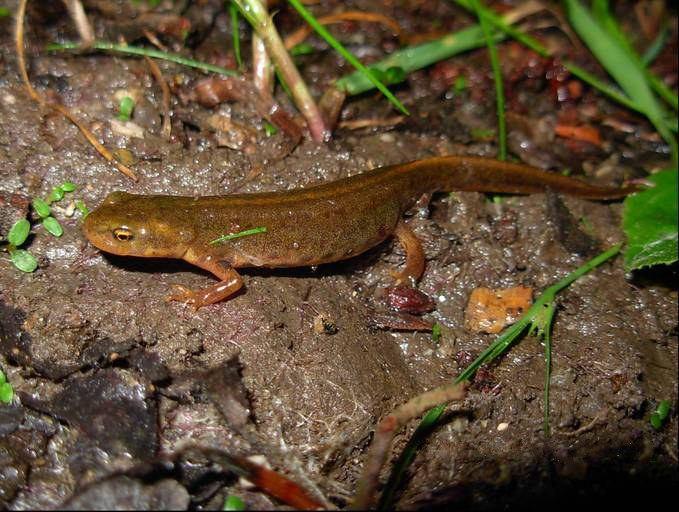
- Ventral surface

Conservation status
- Least Concern (IUCN 3.1)

Scientific classification
- Kingdom: Animalia
- Phylum: Chordata
- Class: Amphibia
- Order: Urodela
- Family: Salamandridae
- Genus: Lissotriton
- Species: L. boscai

Binomial name
- Lissotriton boscai (Lataste, 1879)
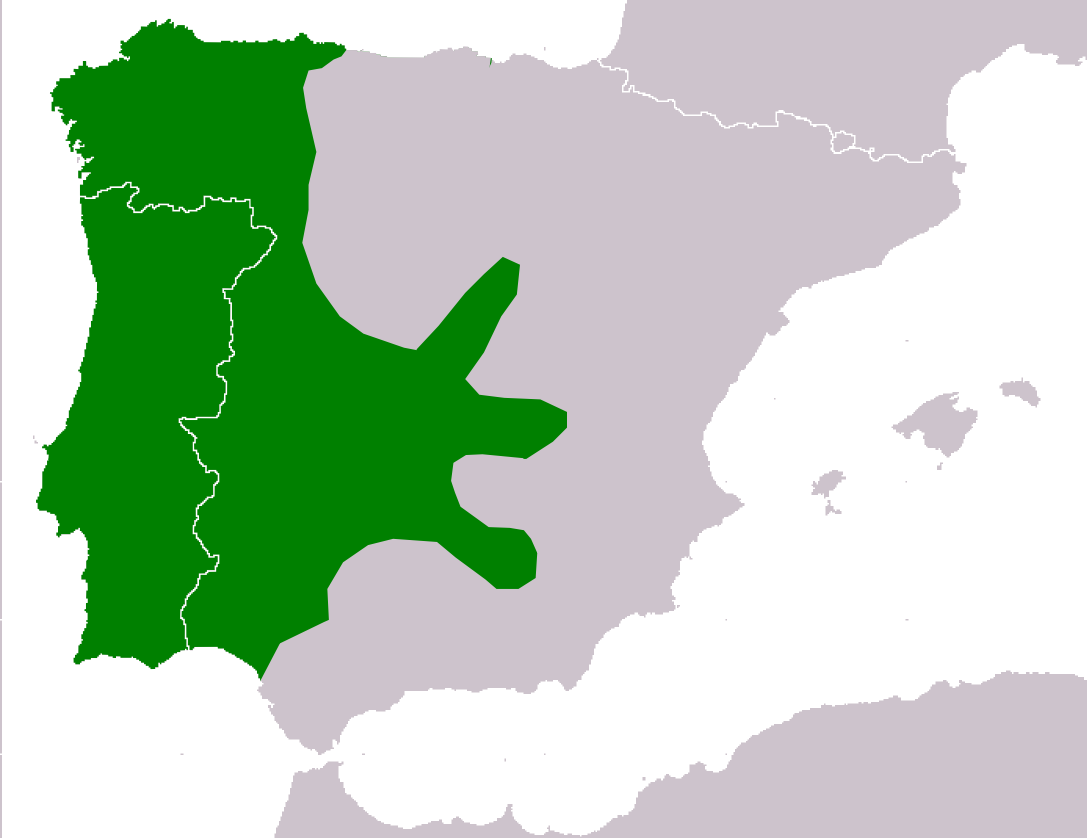

Synonyms
- Triturus boscai Lataste, 1879; Lophinus boscai Litvinchuk et al., 2005; Pelonectes boscai Lataste in Tourneville, 1879

= Bosca's newt =

Boscá's newt

Species of amphibian

Boscá's newt (Lissotriton boscai, formerly Triturus boscai), also known as the Iberian newt, is a species of newt in the family Salamandridae. The species is found in Portugal and western Spain.

== Etymology ==
The specific name boscai is in honor of Spanish herpetologist Eduardo Boscá.

== Description ==
The female is up to 94 millimetres (3.7 in) long and the male up to 75 millimetres (3.0 in). There are glandular ridges along the back and the skin is granular in texture when the newt is living out of water. The body is brownish, yellowish, or dull green with dark spotting. The belly is orange. Unlike some of its congeners, this species is not especially showy during the breeding season. The male develops a brightly colored protuberance at the tip of the tail.

== Distribution and habitat ==
This newt is mostly aquatic, living in shallow ponds and streams lined with vegetation. It can be found in disturbed and artificial water bodies, such as ditches. It is known from oak woodland habitat, scrub, sandy coastal strips, and farms and plantations.

== Conservation ==
Populations are stable and the species is not considered to be threatened, but in some areas it experiences losses due to the destruction and degradation of its aquatic habitat.
