= Willy Wolterstorff =

German paleontologist and herpetologist

Willy Georg Wolterstorff (16 June 1864 in Calbe – 21 January 1943 in Magdeburg) was a German paleontologist and herpetologist.

As a child he lost his hearing due to disease, thus finding it necessary to lip-read from an early age. He learned natural sciences through private lessons. After receiving vocational training as a bookbinder, he studied geology from 1884 under Karl von Fritsch (1838-1906) at the University of Halle. At Halle he also received training as a curator.

In 1889 he became an assistant to Konrad Oebbeke (1853-1932) at the mineralogical-geological institute at Erlangen, and two years later was appointed curator at the Museum für Naturkunde und Vorgeschichte (museum of natural history and prehistory) in Magdeburg. After his retirement in 1929, he remained at the Magdeburg museum, performing important functions as a volunteer.

Wolterstorff is known for scientific research of "lower vertebrates", in particular investigations involving the systematics, reproduction and behavior of members of the family Salamandridae. He was the author of nearly 300 scientific papers, and from 1909 was editor of Blätter für Aquarien- und Terrarienkunde. He is credited with creation of the "Tradescantia-Glas", an enclosure-method (Hälterungsmethode) for maintenance and breeding of newts.

== Tribute ==
The recently extinct Wolterstorff's newt (Cynops wolterstorffi), is one of the species named in his honour. As a taxonomist, he described the salamander genus Mertensiella (1925).

Wolterstorff is also commemorated in the scientific name of a species of gecko, Urocotyledon wolterstorffi

And with the Killifish Austrolebias wolterstorffi (C. G. E. Ahl, 1924).

The Chinese fish Squalidus wolterstorffi wolterstorffi (Regan 1908) was named in honor of Wolterstorff, who "received" fishes from China collected by Martin Kreyenberg, including type of this species.

== Selected works ==
- Das Untercarbon von Magdeburg-Neustadt und seine Fauna, 1898 (graduation thesis at Erlangen).
- Über fossile Frösche, insbesondere das Genus Palaeobatrachus (two parts), 1886–1887 - On fossil frogs, especially the genus Paleobatrachus.
- Unsere Kriechthiere und Lurche, 1888 - Reptiles and amphibians.
- Die Reptilien und Amphibien der Nordwestdeutschen Berglande, 1893 - Reptiles and amphibians of northwestern German hill country.
- Die Tritonen der Untergattung Euproctus Gené und ihr Gefangenleben, nebst einem Überblick der Urodelen der südwestlichen paläarktischen Region, 1902 - treatise on Euproctus, included with an overview of urodele amphibians of the southwestern Palaearctic Region.
