= University of California Botanical Garden =

Botanical garden on the University of California, Berkeley campus

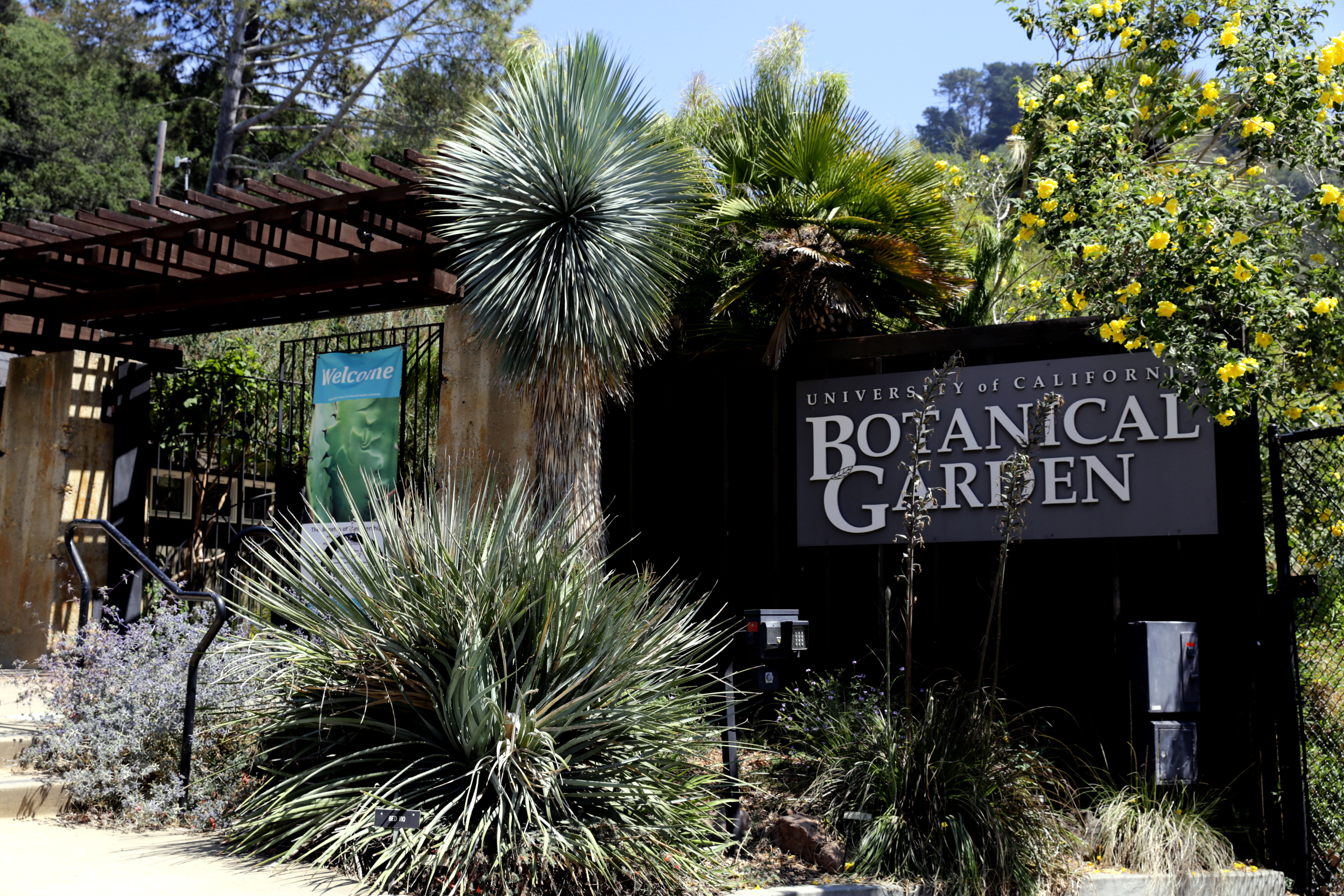
- Interactive map of University of California Botanical Garden
- Type: Botanical Garden
- Location: University of California, Berkeley
- Coordinates: 37°52′30″N 122°14′15″W
- Area: 34 acres (14 ha)
- Created: 1890
- Operator: University of California
- Status: Open all year
- Website: botanicalgarden.berkeley.edu

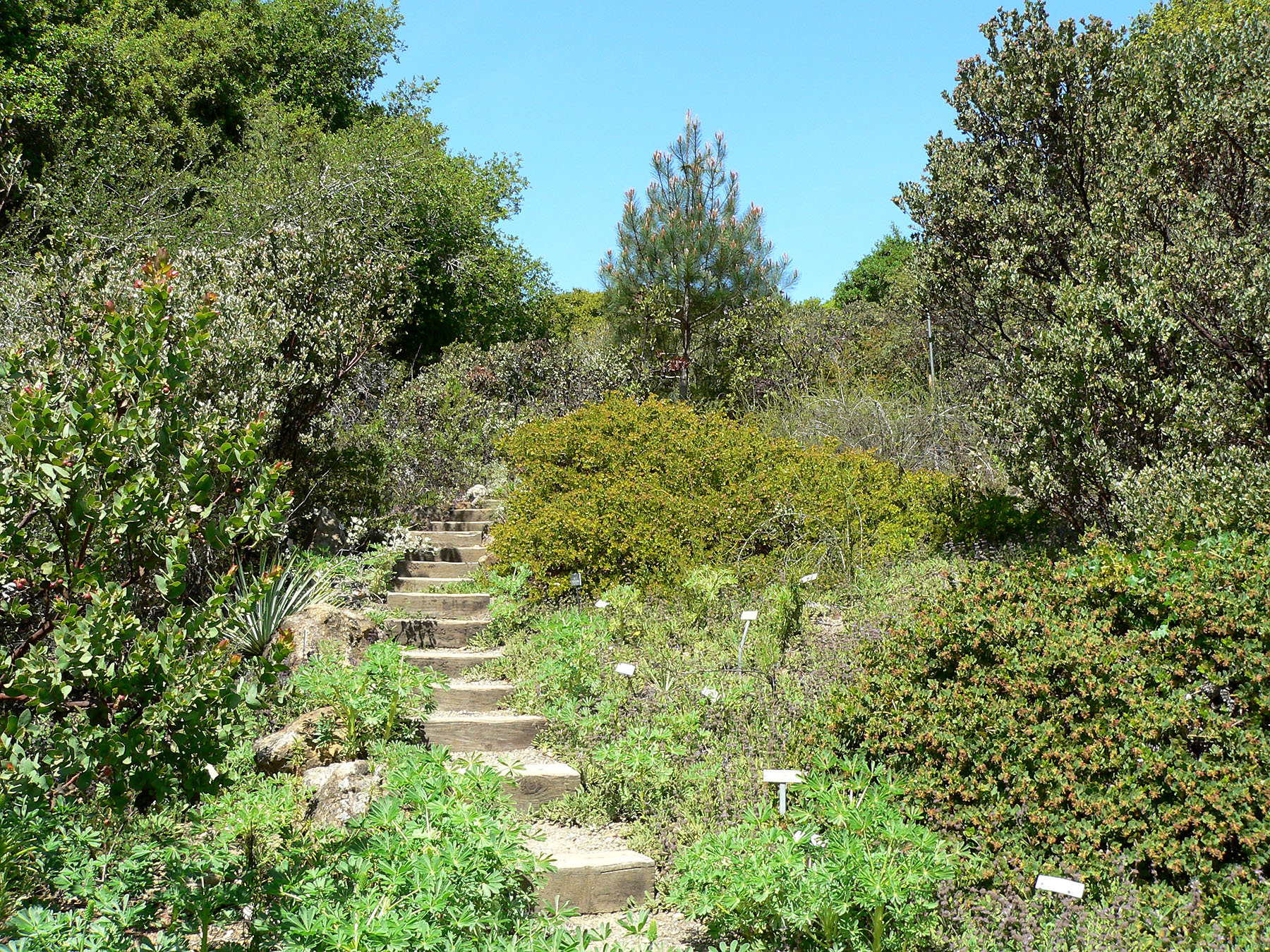
California chaparral flora garden in the Native California flora section.

The University of California Botanical Garden is a 34-acre (13.7 ha) botanical garden located on the University of California, Berkeley campus, in Strawberry Canyon. The garden is in the Berkeley Hills, inside the city boundary of Oakland, with views overlooking the San Francisco Bay. It is one of the most diverse plant collections in the United States, and famous for its large number of rare and endangered species.

== History ==
Development

The garden is situated on the land of the Chochenyo speaking Ohlone people called xučyun (Huichin). In the 1870s, a few years after the founding of the University of California, Berkeley, Dr. Eugene W. Hilgard, the university's first Dean of Agriculture, established a garden of plants on the land which is now Moffit Library.

The University of California Botanical Garden was initially established in 1890 near Haviland Hall on the north side of campus by E.L. Greene, the first chairman of the Department of Botany, to preserve the trees, shrubs, and plants native to the Pacific Coast. Modeled after the famous Crystal Palace in London, the garden's first formal glasshouse-style conservatory was built in 1894 by Lord and Burnham for US$16,000 and housed palm trees and other tropical plants but was later demolished in 1924 to make space for more parking and the construction of Haviland Hall. The garden grew to house six hundred different plant species within the first two years.

In 1909, Strawberry Canyon was purchased by the university and in 1925, the garden was relocated to its current residence in Strawberry Canyon under the directorship of Thomas Harper Goodspeed, the university's Dean of Agriculture, where he stated “the eastward moving air draft from the Golden Gate … with consequent moderating influences on summer temperature and humidity, permit an association of plants, birds, and mammals not duplicated elsewhere in middle western California.” Goodspeed and J.W. Gregg, a professor in the Department of Landscape Design, are credited to have supervised the construction of the garden and its layout in Strawberry Canyon.

In 1932, James West established a rock garden in a collection now known as the "Deserts of the Americas" collection. From October 5, 1933, to May 31, 1934, over 200 young men, as a part of the Civilian Conservation Corps Company 751, built road and dam infrastructure, which aided in many of the garden's future projects. Goodspeed became the official Director of the garden in 1934 and remained the Director until 1957, where he led efforts to cultivate tobacco (Nicotiana), the Rhododendron Dell, the New World Desert collection, and the California Redwood Grove (now Stephen J. Mather Redwood Grove). Expeditions to China, the Andes, Southern Africa, Bolivia, Peru, Mesoamerica, Australia, New Zealand were conducted by Berkeley researchers and paleontologists to expand the garden's collections.

In 1976, The Friends of the Botanical Garden was established to aid with fundraising, volunteering, and public outreach in efforts to support the garden. The group was later dissolved in 1997 but an active group of 250 volunteers continue to aid in similar efforts today.

In 2015, the garden celebrated its 125th anniversary with the renovation of the Redwood Amphitheater located in the garden.

Recent History

After the Golden Gate Exhibition on Treasure Island closed in 1939, the Japanese exhibit was donated to the garden and relocated to Strawberry Canyon from San Francisco. For decades, two newt species, California newt (Taricha torosa) and rough-skinned newt (Taricha granulosa), have lived and laid eggs in the Japanese Pool, an 80-year-old pond.

In early 2023, leaks in the pond were threatening the existence of newts since newts would get lodged into the pond's cracks as water drained and attempt to get freed but eventually drown. In a statement, UC Botanical Garden Director Lewis Feldman said "[newts are] part of the diversity of nature,” and “their disappearance will probably impact on the garden in ways that we probably now can’t understand.” In summer 2023, the garden successfully raised US$150,000 to empty the pond, seal the cracks, plug the sinkholes, and resurface the basin of the pond.

== Collections ==
The garden has more than 20,000 accessions, representing 324 plant families, 12,000 different species and subspecies, and 2,885 genera. Outdoor collections are, in general, arranged geographically and nearly all specimens were collected in the wild.

The major family collections include: cactus (2,669 plants), lily (1,193 plants), sunflower (1,151 plants), erica (897 plants), and orchid (950 plants). Other families include about 500 types of ferns and fern allies, Chinese medicinal herbs, plants of economic importance, old rose cultivars, and California native plants. Sets of greenhouses contain succulents, epiphytes, ferns, carnivorous plants, and tropicals.

=== Geographic layout ===
The garden collections are geographically organized, and include:

South Africa

– featuring South African plants, including: lilies, Proteas, ice plants, Aloes, and Encephalartos.

Asia

— featuring a Rhododendron collection (259 taxa, 397 accessions), including many mature trees. (Rhododendrons too tender for most North American climates.)) Also present are specimens of the redwood family, including the original dawn redwoods (Metasequoia), and dozens of unusual shrubs, vines, and herbaceous species recently collected from China.

Australasia

– plants from Australia and New Zealand; with southern beeches, banksias, myrtles such as eucalyptus, cycads, and phormiums.

California Native

– over 4,000 accessions, including nearly one-half of the state's native vascular plant species and 174 taxa on the California Native Plant Society's list of rare and endangered species –Prominent genera are: manzanitas (Arctostaphylos spp.) with 81 taxa (252 accessions), California-Lilacs (Ceanothus spp.) with 55 taxa (164 accessions), and an almost complete collection of California bulbous monocots in the Lily and Amaryllis families (Fritillaria, Calochortus, Lilium, Erythronium, Allium, Brodiaea) with 118 taxa (234 accessions)

Chinese Medicinal Herb Garden

– selections from the pharmacopeia of modern China.

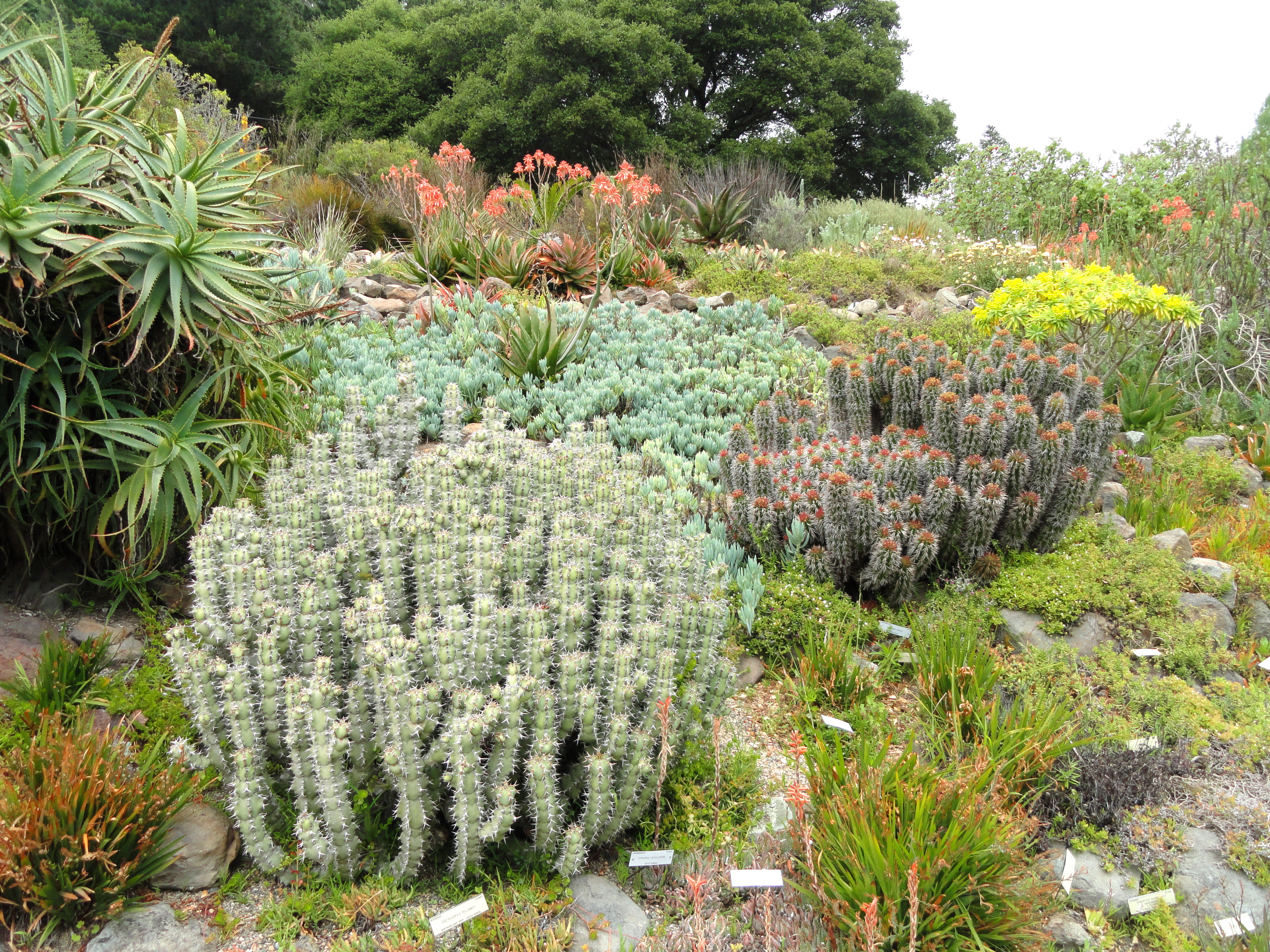
Cactus garden specimens.

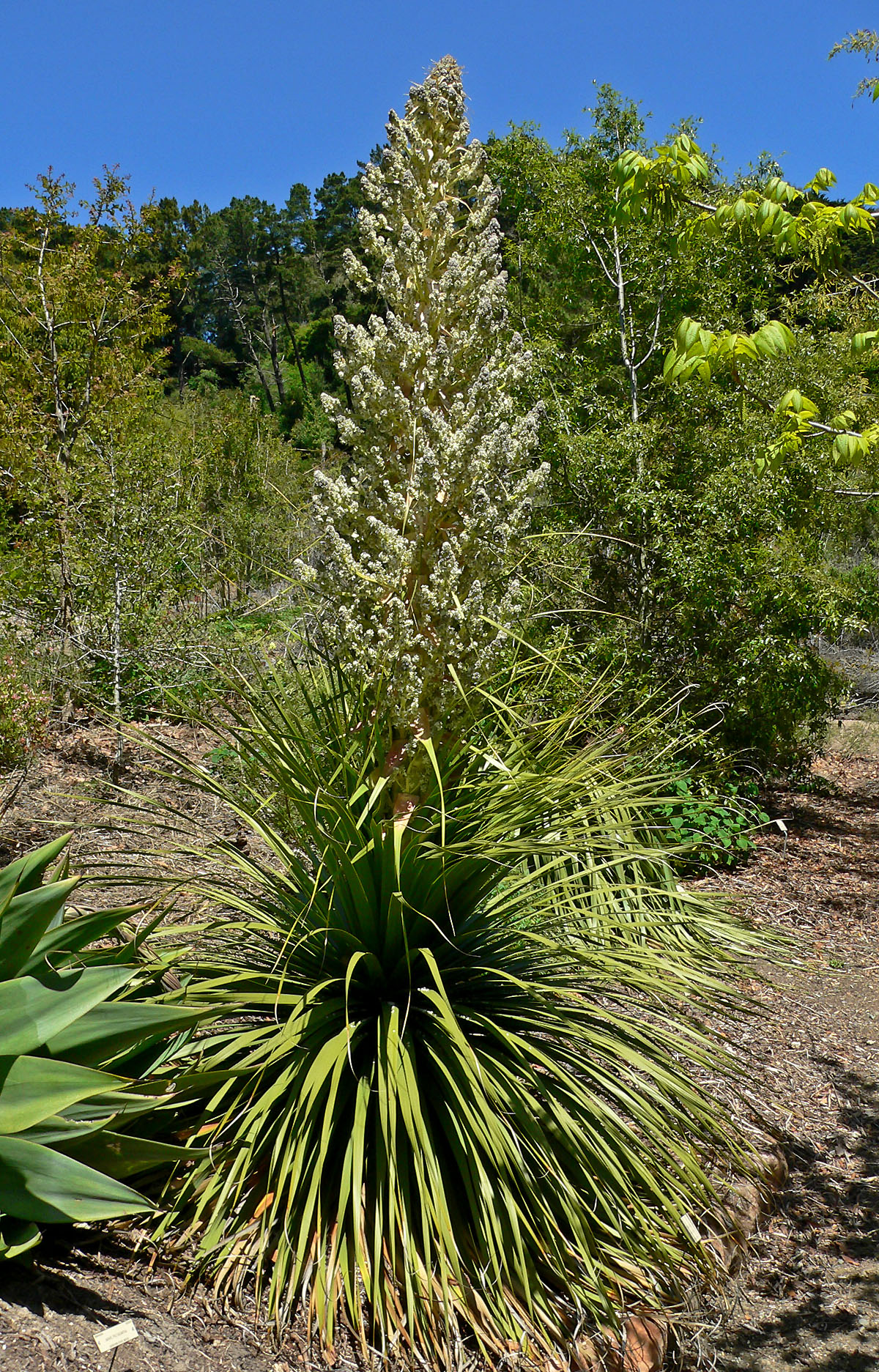
Blooming Nolina siberica specimen.

Mediterranean

– exhibits flora from the region's countries, including: Morocco, Spain, Portugal, the Canary Islands, Turkey, and Syria, on a hillside with views across the San Francisco Bay.

Deserts of the Americas

– bristles with cacti and other succulents from North and Central America, plus the high deserts of the Andes.

Eastern North America

– includes deciduous trees such as tulip tree (Liriodendron), bald cypress (Taxodium), and dogwoods (Cornus).

Meso American

– shows the diversity of Central American habitats with genera found in both mountain and desert areas such as Agaves, oaks (Quercus), pines, and a range of brightly flowered Salvias.

South America

– with a grove of monkey puzzle trees (Araucaria araucana), a collection of fuchsias, and several species of southern beech. The garden also has a selection of cultivars of Lapageria.

Greenhouses

The garden's greenhouses include:

- the Arid House, presenting seasonal exhibits of cacti and succulents.
- the fern and carnivorous plants house display diverse ferns and unusual insect-eating plants.
- the tropical house (renovated in 2024) features tropical plants of economic value, and many curiosities such as the giant corpse lily Amorphophallus.

Asian Plant Collection

The UC Botanical Garden is home to the renowned Asian plant collection—a repository of some of the world's rarest and most precious flora. This botanical gem, however, was damaged by a colossal redwood tree's toppling during a powerful storm, along with the Asian section “the top half of the garden’s only Parana pine tree, a critically endangered species from Brazil [,] a prized eucalyptus from Australia’s Queensland region and a gum-leaf cone bush from Southern Africa” were also damaged. In response, a team of experts swiftly converged on the site, located high in the hills above the UC Berkeley campus, with the urgent mission of rescuing and rehabilitating the battered plants to salvage what could be preserved. This effort was motivated by the exceptional difficulty in replacing these specimens, as many were originally sourced from the wild, making their preservation crucial.

The UC Botanical Garden's Asian collection stands as both a unique botanical resource and a site of serene beauty. It holds historic significance, with its origins dating back to the early 1900s when plants were gathered from expeditions to western China and Tibet by explorers like George Forrest and Joseph Rock. What distinguishes this garden is its comprehensive documentation of each plant's provenance, contributing to its scientific value. In addition to the Asian section, several other Bay Area botanical gardens also experienced losses from the same devastating storm, highlighting the vulnerability of these curated collections to the unpredictable forces of nature.

The arduous process of recovery involves the removal of debris to access damaged plant beds and then careful assessment and restoration work. Notably, the fate of these plants is uncertain, as they may not exhibit immediate signs of distress, and recovery is an ongoing process. Some plants are pruned for rehabilitation, while others are transported back to the garden's nursery, where cuttings are cultivated to create a new generation of the lost plants.

== Wildlife ==
Newts

The cohabitating newts of the Japanese Pond usually return to their birthing pool in the beginning of the wet season, typically sometime around the month of October. As the newts return to their ponds, they can be seen migrating along paths and roads so be sure to watch where you are walking when visiting the pool. Their breeding season typically begins in December and lasts anywhere from 6-12 weeks and can extend into May. During their breeding season the newts can be seen in their aquatic forms, where they acquire certain characteristics such as smooth skin and a laterally flattened tail. After breeding occurs, you can then see the egg masses in the pond. The eggs are in a gelatinous mass that is submerged under the water and attached to branches, rocks, or other debris. The California Newt (Taricha torosa) larvae can be seen maturing in these eggs and once they hatch after 14-52 days and are noted by their bushy gills, dorsal tail fin, and light yellow dorsum with two dark bands. The Rough-skinned Newt (Taricha granulosa) larvae have similar characteristics but have a weaker dorsal stripe which then transitions into mottling in older larvae. Although the two newt species look rather similar as adults, they can be told apart by the Unken reflex. Taricha granulosa will engage in this reflex when startled, the reflex can be described by the head and tail being raised simultaneously. It is also important to remember not to handle the newts, their skin secretes a neurotoxin known as tetrodotoxin that humans are very sensitive to. If you do touch a newt for some reason, be sure to wash your hands thoroughly before eating food or touching your mouth or face.

== Gallery ==
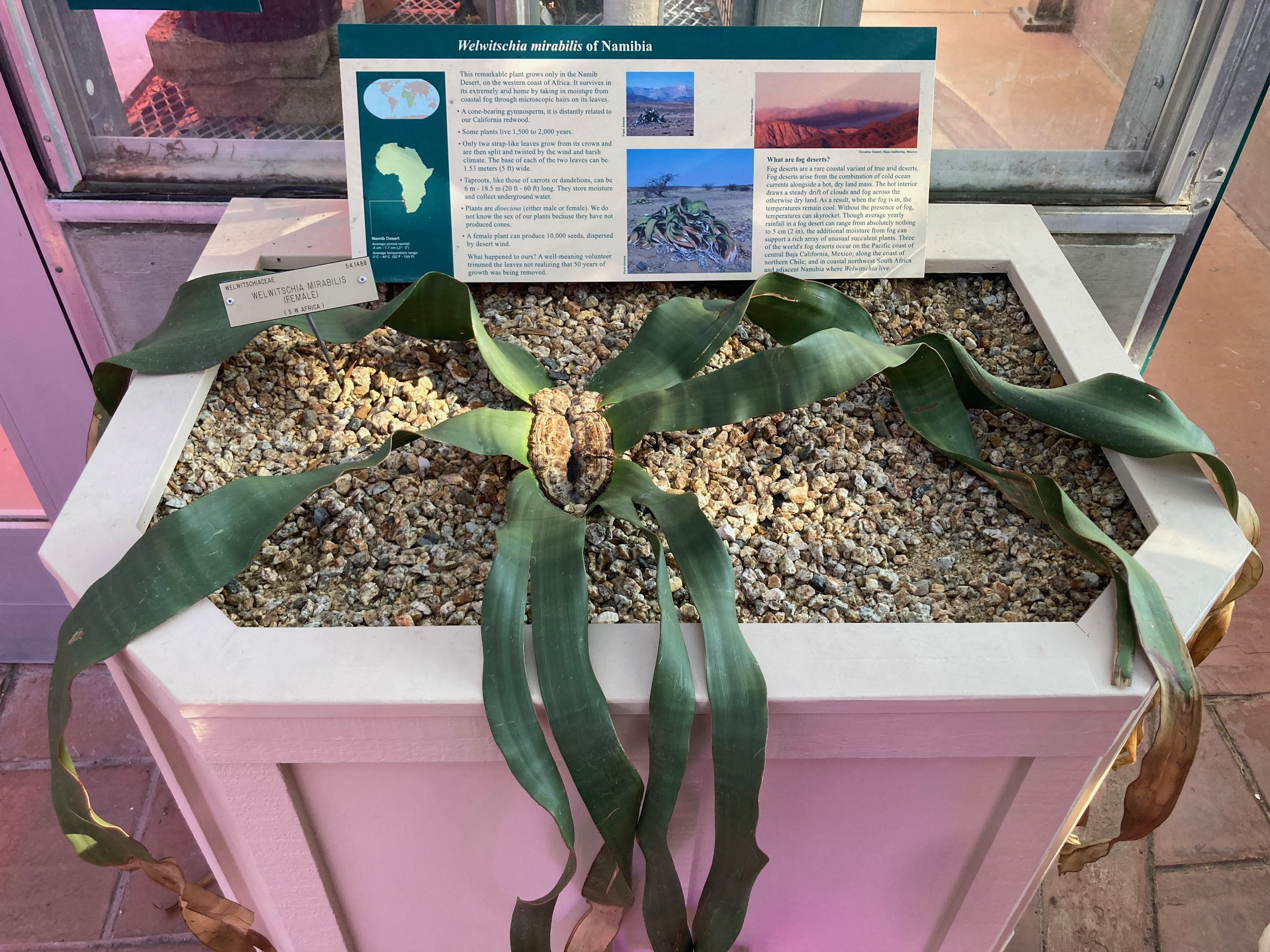
Welwitschia mirabilis.

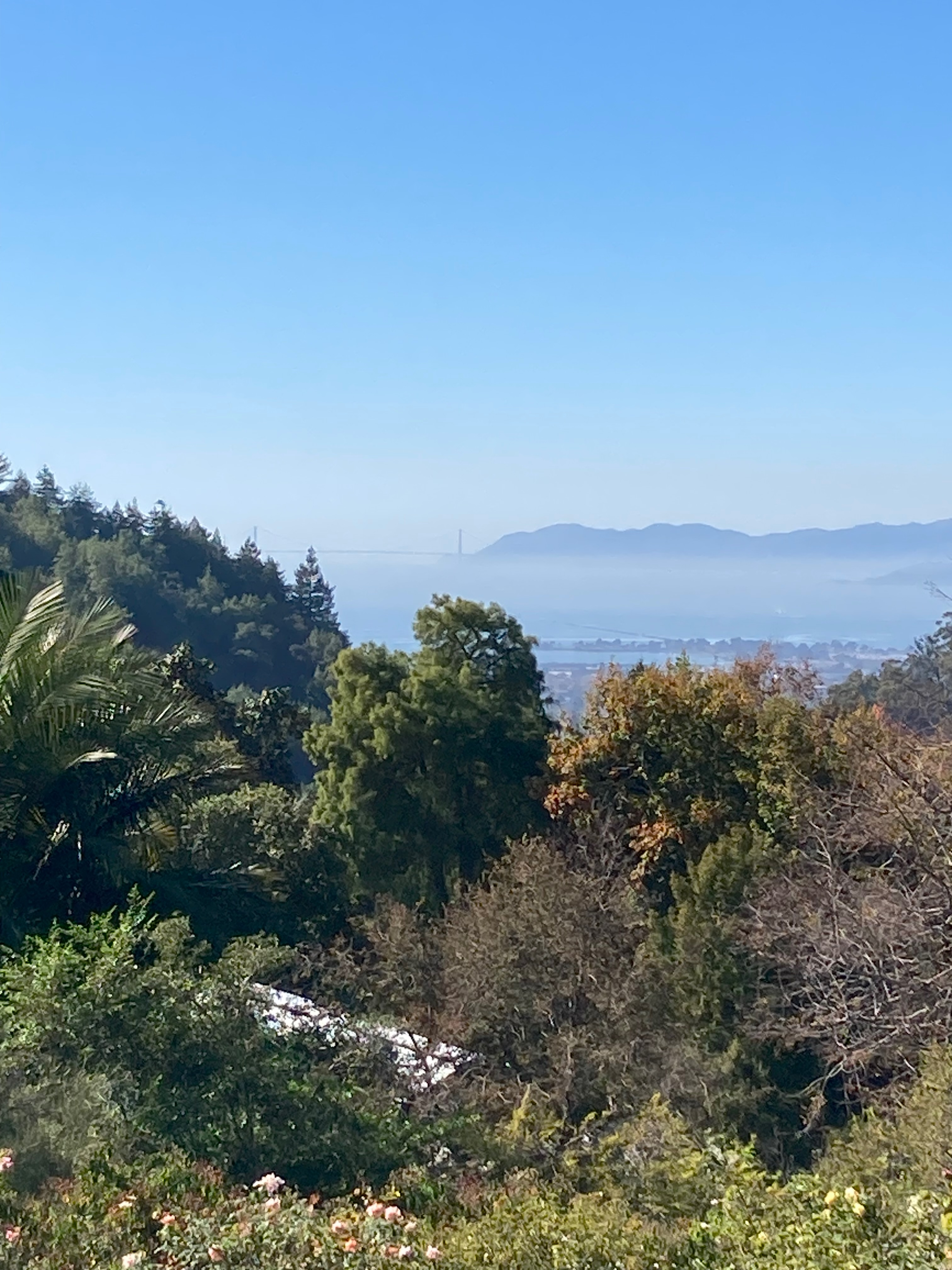
View of San Francisco from the Garden.

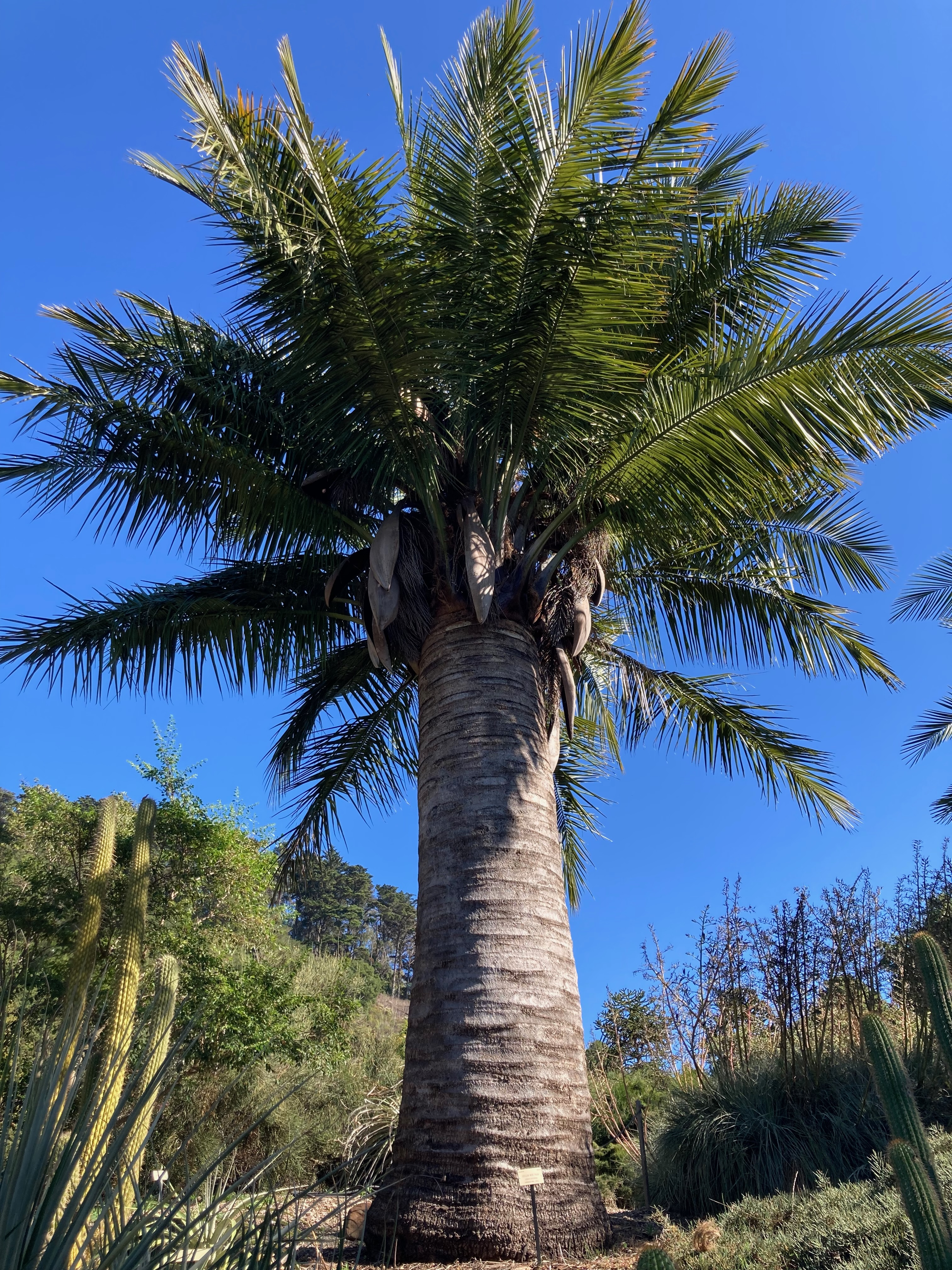
Chilean Wine Palm.

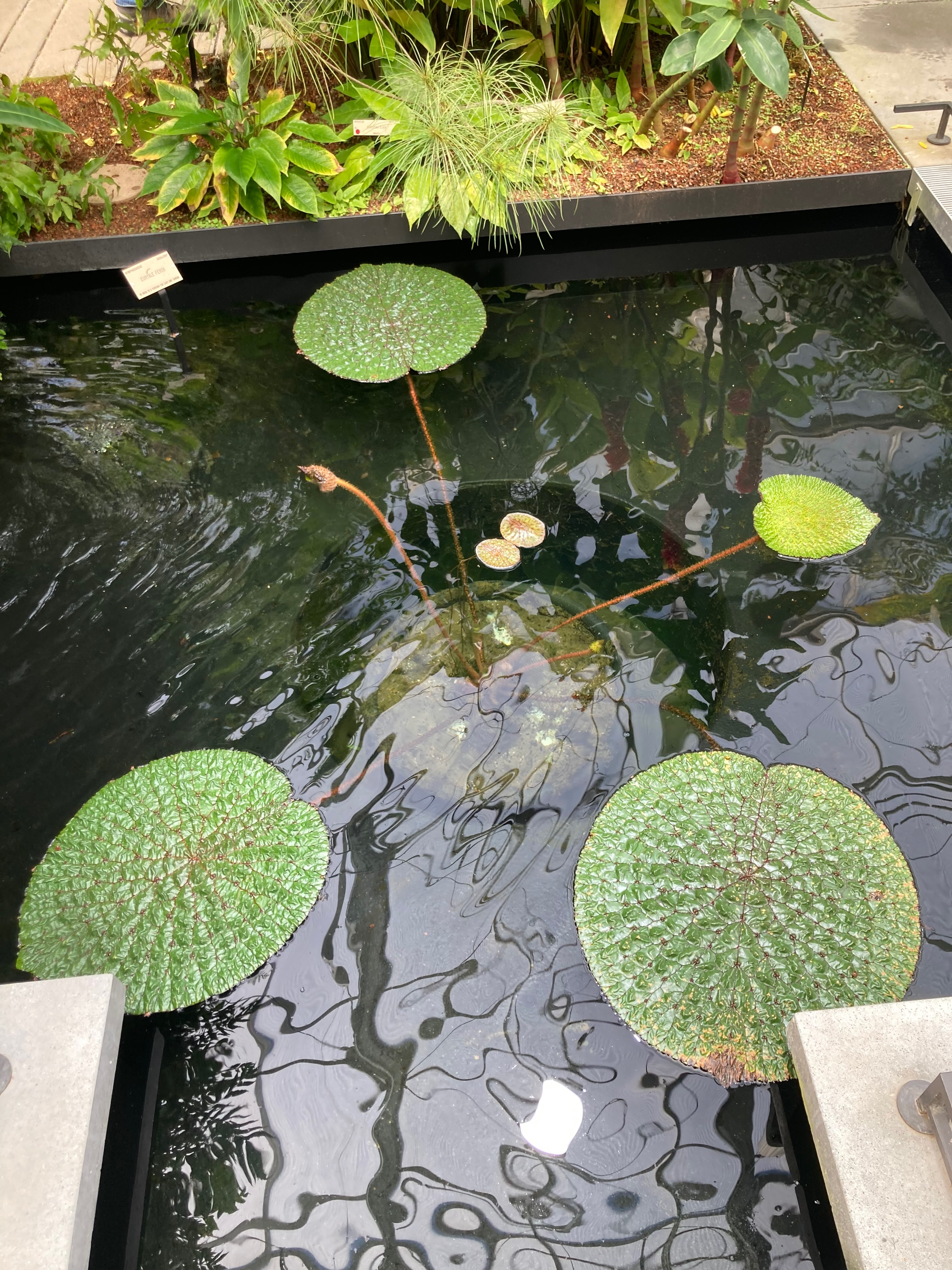
Euryale ferox.

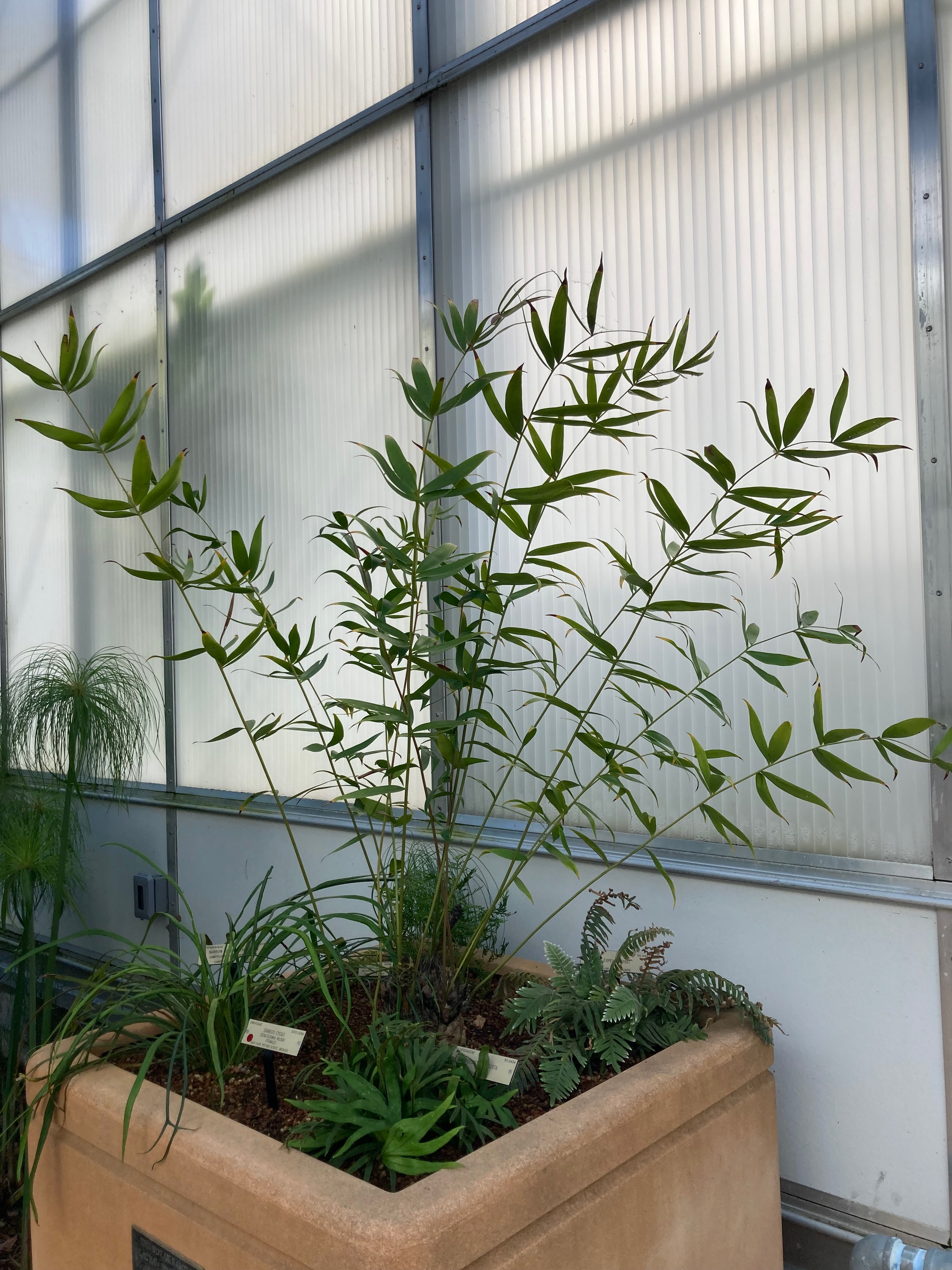
Ceratozamia hildae.

== See also ==
- List of California native plants
- List of botanical gardens in the United States
