= Crater Lake newt =

Conservation status
- Critically Imperiled (NatureServe)

Scientific classification
- Kingdom: Animalia
- Phylum: Chordata
- Class: Amphibia
- Order: Urodela
- Family: Salamandridae
- Genus: Taricha
- Species: T. granulosa
- Subspecies: T. g. mazamae

Trinomial name
- Taricha granulosa mazamae (Myers, 1942)

Subspecies of amphibian

The Crater Lake newt or Mazama newt, Taricha granulosa mazamae, is a subspecies of the rough-skinned newt. Its type locality is Crater Lake, Oregon. Crater Lake newts are genetically and morphologically distinct from neighboring rough-skinned newts, with the most notable differences being a comparative lack of tetrodotoxin in their skin, and a darker ventral surface. While other members of their species have orange lower surfaces, in an example of aposematic coloration to warn predators of their toxicity, Crater Lake newts were the apex predators in their environment for thousands of years, and lost the highly toxic skin of their ancestors.

Similar newts have been found in Alaska, but their identity is unclear.

The Crater Lake newt population is under threat due to predation from crayfish and rainbow trout that have been introduced into the lake.
