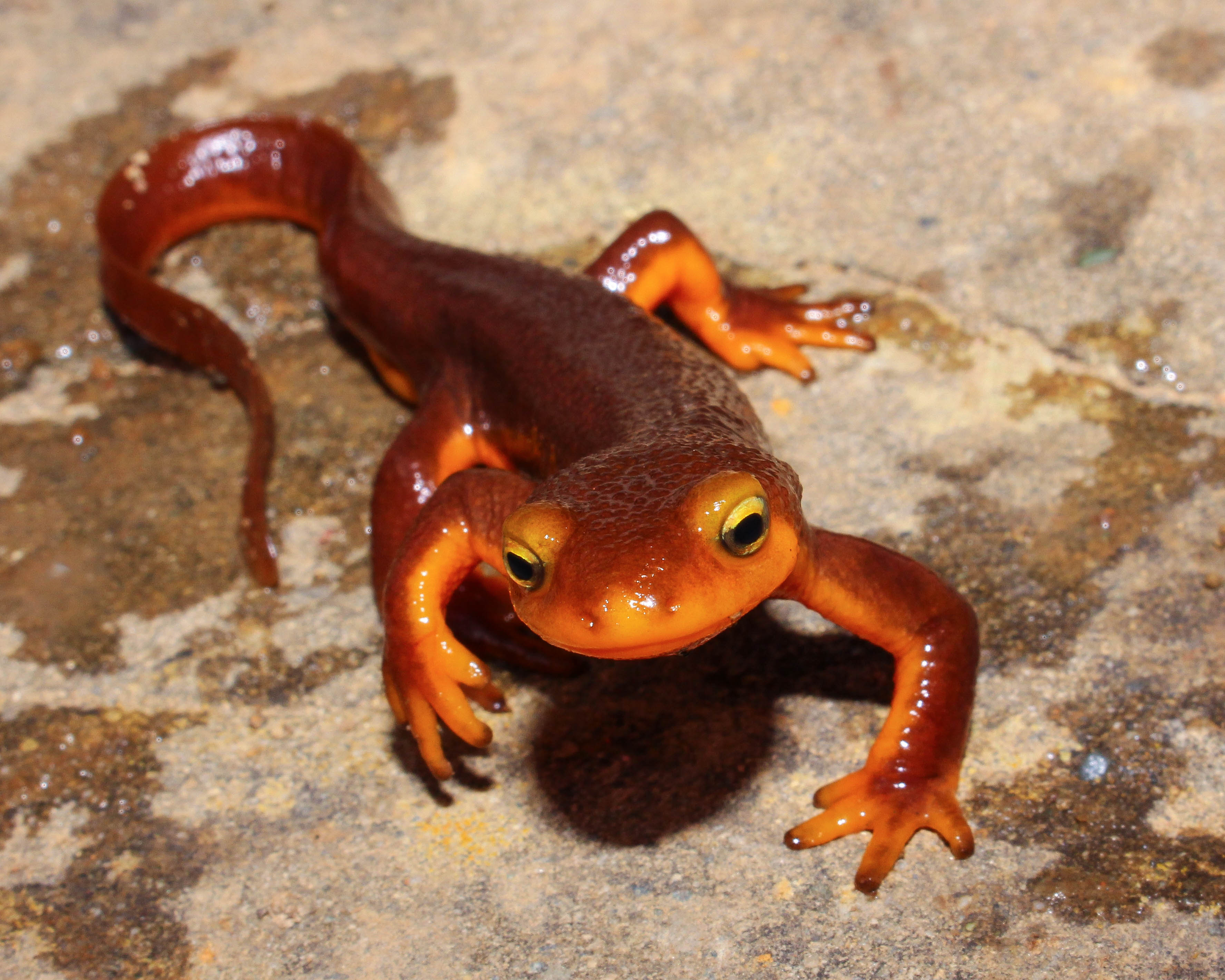

Conservation status
- Near Threatened (IUCN 3.1)

Scientific classification
- Kingdom: Animalia
- Phylum: Chordata
- Class: Amphibia
- Order: Urodela
- Family: Salamandridae
- Genus: Taricha
- Species: T. torosa

Binomial name
- Taricha torosa (Rathke, in Eschscholtz, 1833)
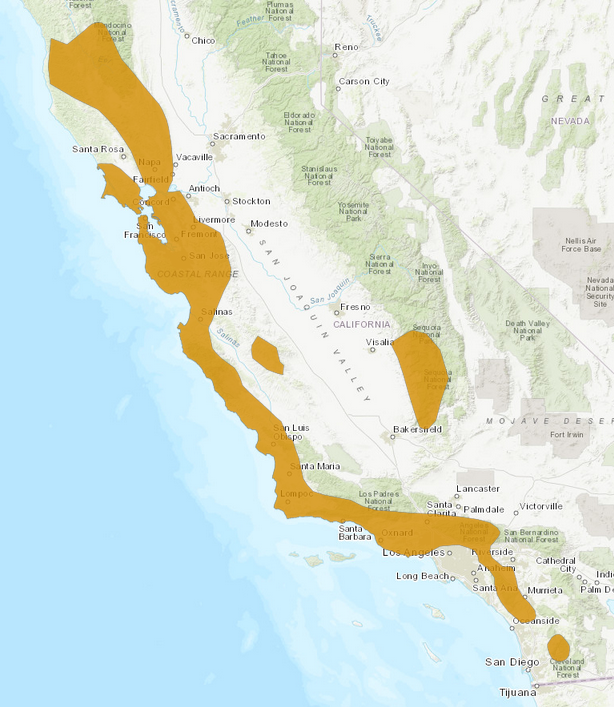

Synonyms
- Triton torosa Rathke, 1833; Triton Ermani Wiegmann in Erman, 1835; Salamandra beecheyi Gray, 1839; Pleurodeles californiae Gray, 1850; Taricha laevis Baird & Girard, 1853; Amblystoma rubrum Reid, 1895

= California newt =

Species of amphibian

The California newt or orange-bellied newt (Taricha torosa), is a species of newt endemic to California, in the Western United States. Its adult length can range from 5 to 8 in (13 to 20 cm). Its skin produces the potent toxin tetrodotoxin.

== Subspecies ==
Taricha torosa was divided into two subspecies until 2007, when it was determined that the Sierra and coastal populations represent distinct evolutionary lineages. The former subspecies Taricha torosa sierrae was elevated to full species level and it is now known as Taricha sierrae, the Sierra newt. Taricha torosa torosa has been retired and now all coastal populations are simply known as Taricha torosa, the California newt.

== Range and habitat ==
California newts reside in the coastal counties of California and in the southern and central Sierra Nevada and occupy a diverse array of habitats found near the small ponds and creeks where they breed, including woodlands and chaparral.

== Description ==
The California newt has warty, slate-gray skin on its back and bright orange-yellow skin underneath. It is very similar in appearance to the rough-skinned newt and they are often indistinguishable without dissection, but in general, the California newt has orange skin around the bottom of its eye while the Rough-skinned has gray skin at the bottom of its eye. The California newt also has eyes that protrude beyond the edge of the jaw line when viewed from above (while the eyes of the rough-skinned do not protrude), giving its head a more bullet-like appearance. The red-bellied newt is also similar but has dark irises vs. yellow in the California newt, more red coloration underneath, and a dark band across the vent that is lacking in the California newt. Newts are amphibians. They are related to salamanders (in a subfamily called Pleurodelinae). They live in North America, Europe and Asia. Their skin tends to be rougher than the skin of salamanders.

== Reproduction ==
Reproduction occurs generally between December and early May. Typically, the adult newts will return to the pool in which they hatched. After a mating dance, the male mounts the female and rubs his chin on her nose. He then attaches a spermatophore to the substrate, which she will retrieve into her cloaca.

The egg mass released by the female contains between seven and 30 eggs, and is roughly the consistency of a thick gelatin dessert. Typically, the egg masses are attached to stream plant roots or to rocky crevices in small pools of slow-moving water, but they have also been known to be attached to underwater rocks or leaf debris. While shallow in a wide sense, these pools are rather deep relative to the average depth of a Southern California stream, varying in depth from about 1–2 metres (3.3–6.6 ft).

Adult newts typically leave the pools shortly after breeding has concluded, however, some adults may remain in the pools for an additional few months to feed. Larvae hatch sometime in early to midsummer, depending on local water temperature. Larvae are difficult to find in streams, as they blend in well with the sandy bottom, to which they usually stay close.

The size of maternal eggs influence the sizes of larvae. The larvae from larger eggs will not only experience shorter time period on metamorphose than larvae from smaller eggs, but also grow larger.

== Behavior ==
California newts are primarily nocturnal and find cover under rocks, logs, or leaf litter throughout the day. Due to their affinity for rainy conditions, their general activity increases in the presence of precipitation. During this wet season, they travel to ponds, streams, and slow-moving water bodies to breed, often returning to the same locations annually.

In terms of asserting territoriality, California newts tend to exhibit aggressive behavior in order to mark their territory. This is especially the case between males, as California newts tend to be more gregarious and assertive in breeding season. Shortly after breeding season, the California newt tends to revert back to more solitary behavior in both the aquatic and terrestrial phases of its life cycle. This pattern applies to both their aquatic and terrestrial phases, with individuals becoming less social outside of mating contexts.

In addition to its bright coloration, the California newt has developed the ability to secrete a foamy substance when exposed to high temperatures. This adaptation is particularly useful in fire-prone environments such as the coastal regions of California. The foam acts as a barrier as it forms a protective layer that helps the newt retain moisture and shield itself from burns during wildfire events.

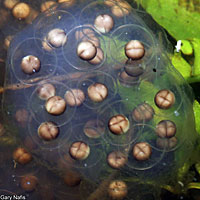
California newt eggs

== Vocalization ==
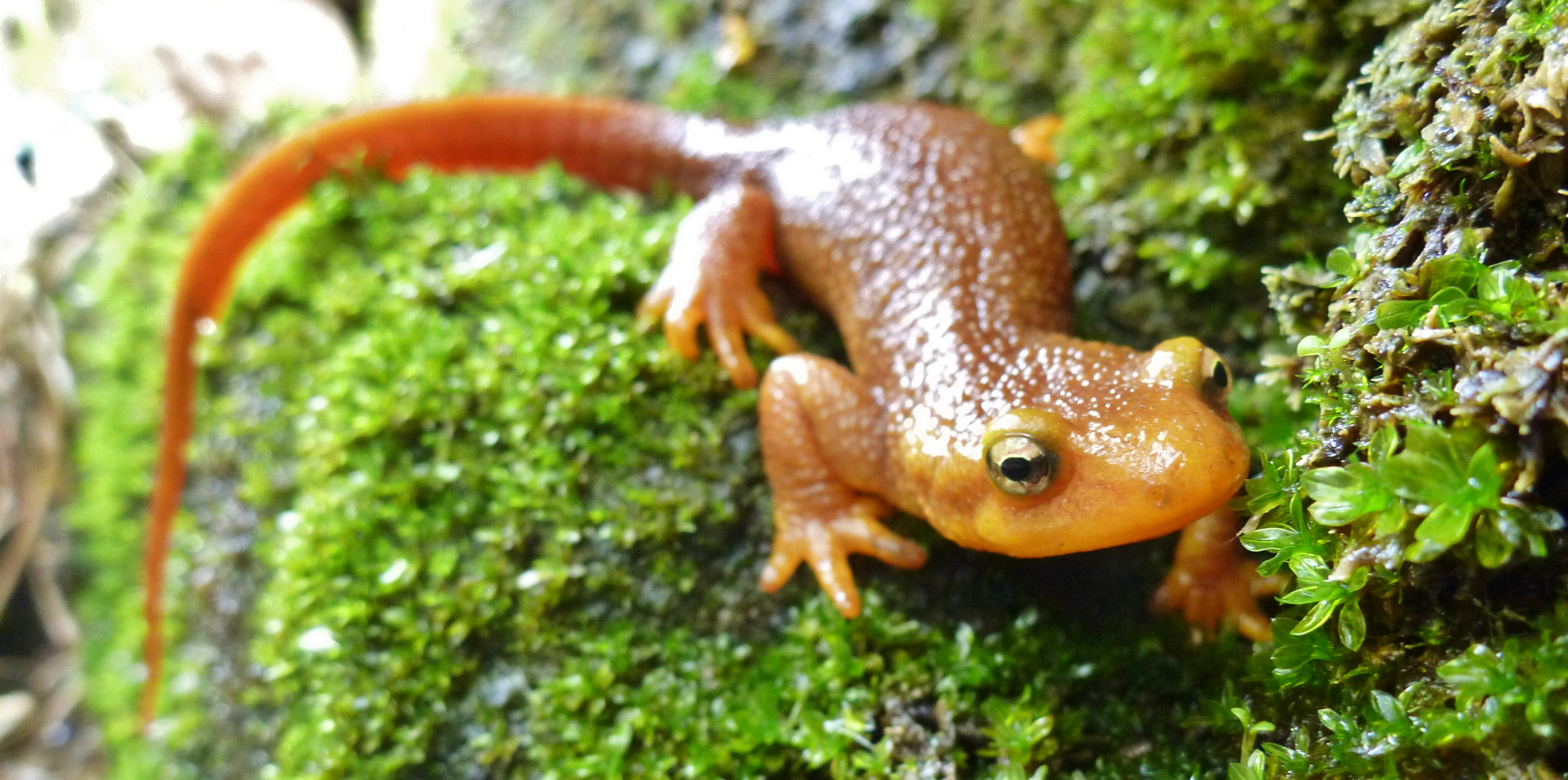
California newt

Newts are mistakenly believed not to vocalize. Their vocalizations exhibit a wide frequency range from 1.4 kHz to 8 kHz, with varying duration times ranging from less than 0.1 second to 0.4 seconds.

The vocalizations of California newts are functional and are usually related to defense and sexual behaviors. They have three primary vocalizations: clicks, squeaks, and whistles. Clicks are most frequently produced, usually occurring in response to unfamiliar environments or confrontations. Squeaks are associated with defense behavior and may serve to startle predators, potentially reinforcing the recognition of the species as toxic. Whistles appear to be related to sex recognition or hierarchical interactions.

== Toxicity and predation ==
Like other genus Taricha members, the glands in the skin of Taricha torosa secrete the potent neurotoxin tetrodotoxin, which is hundreds of times more toxic than cyanide. This is the same toxin found in pufferfish and harlequin frogs. Researchers believe bacteria synthesize tetrodotoxin, and the animals that employ the neurotoxin acquire it through consumption of these bacteria. This neurotoxin is strong enough to kill most vertebrates, including humans.

Due to their toxicity, California newts have few natural predators. Garter snakes are the most common, and some species have developed a genetic resistance to tetrodotoxin. The mutations in the snake's genes that conferred resistance to the toxin have resulted in a selective pressure that favors newts that produce more potent levels of toxin. Increases in newt toxicity then apply a selective pressure favoring snakes with mutations conferring even greater resistance. This evolutionary arms race has resulted in the newts producing levels of toxin far in excess of what is needed to kill any other conceivable predator.

Taricha torosa has also been known to utilize the unken reflex in response to threats from predators. In this posture the California Newt stretches out flexes the dorsal side of their body shooting their head and tail into the air, and exposing their brightly colored underbelly. This variation of the unken reflex seems to be species-specific and differs from Taricha granulosa due to the tail remaining straight instead of curling.

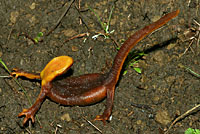
California newt unken reflex

== Diet ==
Earthworms, snails, slugs, woodlice, bloodworms, mosquito larvae, crickets, and other invertebrates are among the California newt's prey. Adult newts have also been known to cannibalize their own eggs and larvae. In the Sierra Nevada, the newt will also consume trout eggs. In an aquarium habitat, earthworms provide the newt with all necessary nutrients. Other natural prey items would benefit the captive newt. Pellets tend to be inappropriate for terrestrial caudates, and fish food should be avoided completely.

== Conservation status ==
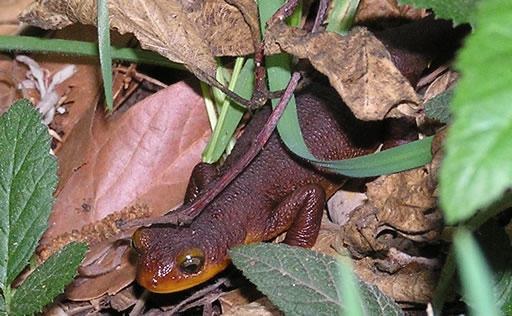
California newt in a Southern Californian riparian habitat

Taricha torosa, the California newt, is currently a California Special Concern species (DFG-CSC). Some populations have been greatly reduced in southern California coastal streams due to the introduction of non-native, invasive species and human habitation. The mosquitofish (Gambusia affinis) and red swamp crayfish (Procambarus clarkii) have caused the greatest reduction in newt populations.

Introduced as fish bait and stock pond prey, red swamp crayfish are an incredibly aggressive, prolific, and stalwart species that will prey upon newt larvae and egg masses. The crayfish will also disrupt newt breeding via competition for space during the summer mating season and physically antagonizing adults. Crayfish will typically maul the adult newts with their claws, and subsequent infection can lead to death. Taricha torosa that are present in streams with introduced crayfish often sport tails with several notches removed.
