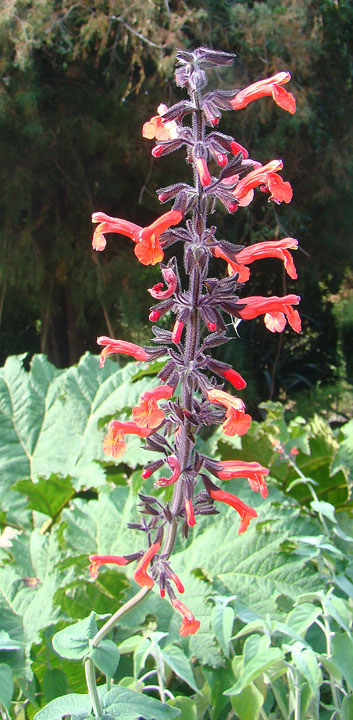

Scientific classification
- Kingdom: Plantae
- Clade: Tracheophytes
- Clade: Angiosperms
- Clade: Eudicots
- Clade: Asterids
- Order: Lamiales
- Family: Lamiaceae
- Genus: Salvia
- Species: S. rubescens

Binomial name
- Salvia rubescens Kunth

= Salvia rubescens =

Species of flowering plant

Salvia rubescens is a herbaceous perennial flowering plant native to the state of Mérida in Venezuela. The University of California Botanical Garden had been growing it since 1993 from a plant collected that year in Venezuela, only identifying it as S. rubescens in 2001.

Salvia rubescens is an erect plant that grows 4–5 ft (1.2–1.5 m) tall, and is fully covered with mid-green ovate leaves with a sawtooth edge. The leaves grow as large as 4.5 in (11 cm) long by 3.5 in (8.9 cm) wide, and are lightly covered with hairs on both surfaces. The inflorescences grow another 1–2 ft (0.30–0.61 m) above the foliage, with flowering beginning in midsummer and lasting until the first frost. The flower stems and the calyx are both dark purple and covered with fine hairs. The 1 in (2.5 cm) flowers are a vibrant red-orange color, growing in widely spaced whorls. Many flowers come into bloom at the same time, making for a very showy plant.

The Latin specific epithet rubescens means "becoming red".
