= Homing (biology) =

Ability of an animal to navigate towards an original location

A homing pigeon. These have been selectively bred to home over long distances.

Homing is the inherent ability of an animal to navigate towards an original location through unfamiliar areas. This location may be a home territory or a breeding spot.

== Uses ==
Homing abilities can be used to find the way back to home in a migration. It is often used in reference to going back to a breeding spot seen years before, as in the case of salmon. Homing abilities can also be used to go back to familiar territory when displaced over long distances, such as with the red-bellied newt.

== True navigation ==
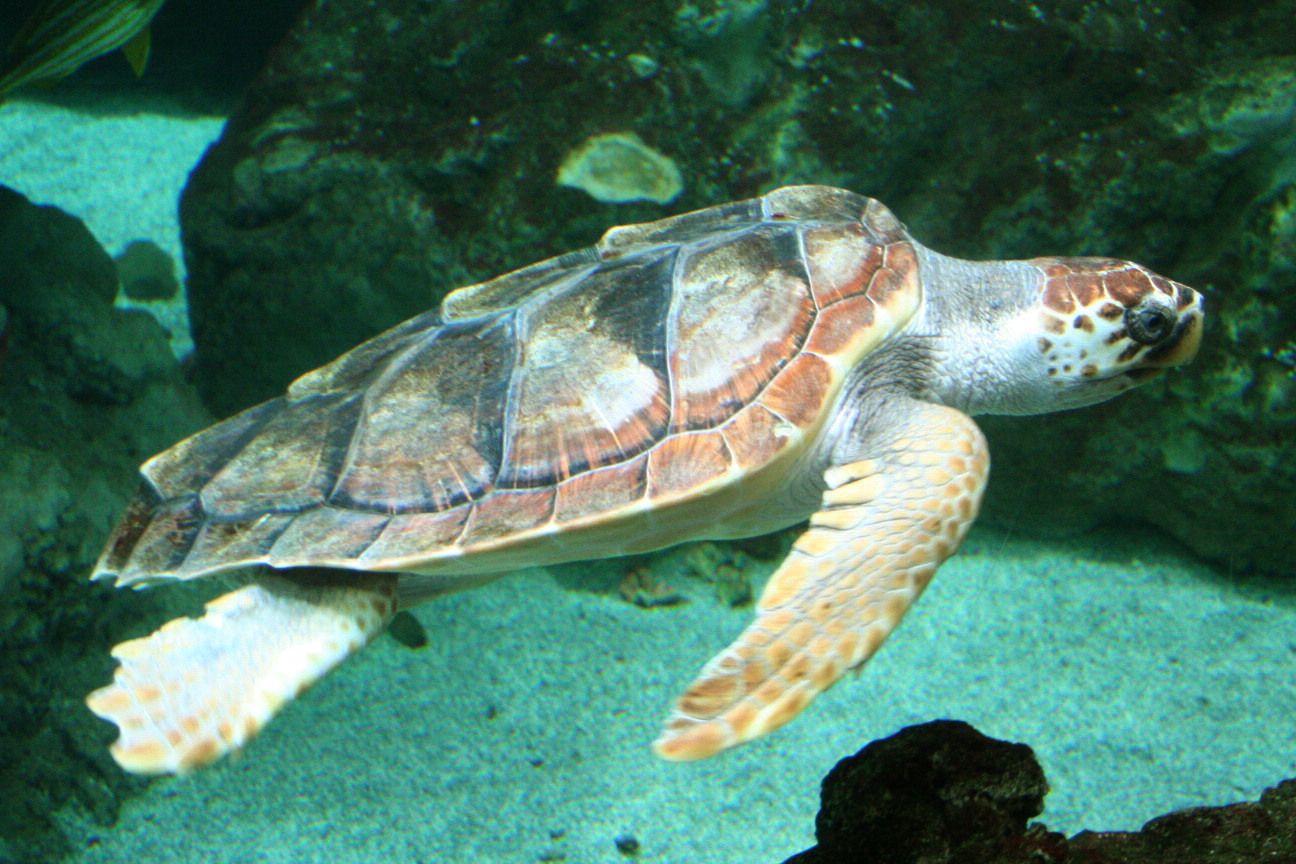
Loggerhead sea turtles home using both true navigation and magnetic orientation

Some animals use true navigation for their homing. This means in familiar areas they will use landmarks such as roads, rivers or mountains when flying, or islands and other landmarks while swimming. However, this only works in familiar territory. Homing pigeons, for example, will often navigate using familiar landmarks, such as roads. Sea turtles will also use landmarks to orient themselves.

== Magnetic orientation ==
Many animals use magnetic orientation based on the Earth's magnetic field to find their way home. This is usually used together with other methods, such as a sun compass, as in bird migration and in the case of turtles. This is also commonly used when no other methods are available, as in the case of lobsters, which live underwater, and mole rats, which home through their burrows.

== Celestial orientation ==
Celestial orientation, navigation using the stars, is commonly used for homing. Displaced marbled newts, for example, can only home when stars are visible.

== Olfaction ==
There is evidence that olfaction, or smell, is used in homing with several salamanders, such as the red-bellied newt. Olfaction is also necessary for the homing of salmon.

== Topographic memory ==
Topographic memory, memory of the contours surrounding the destination, is one common method for navigation. This is mainly used by animals with less intelligence, such as molluscs. Limpets use this to find their way back to the home scrape; although whether this is true homing has been disputed.

== See also ==
- Natal homing
- Philopatry
- Homing endonuclease gene
