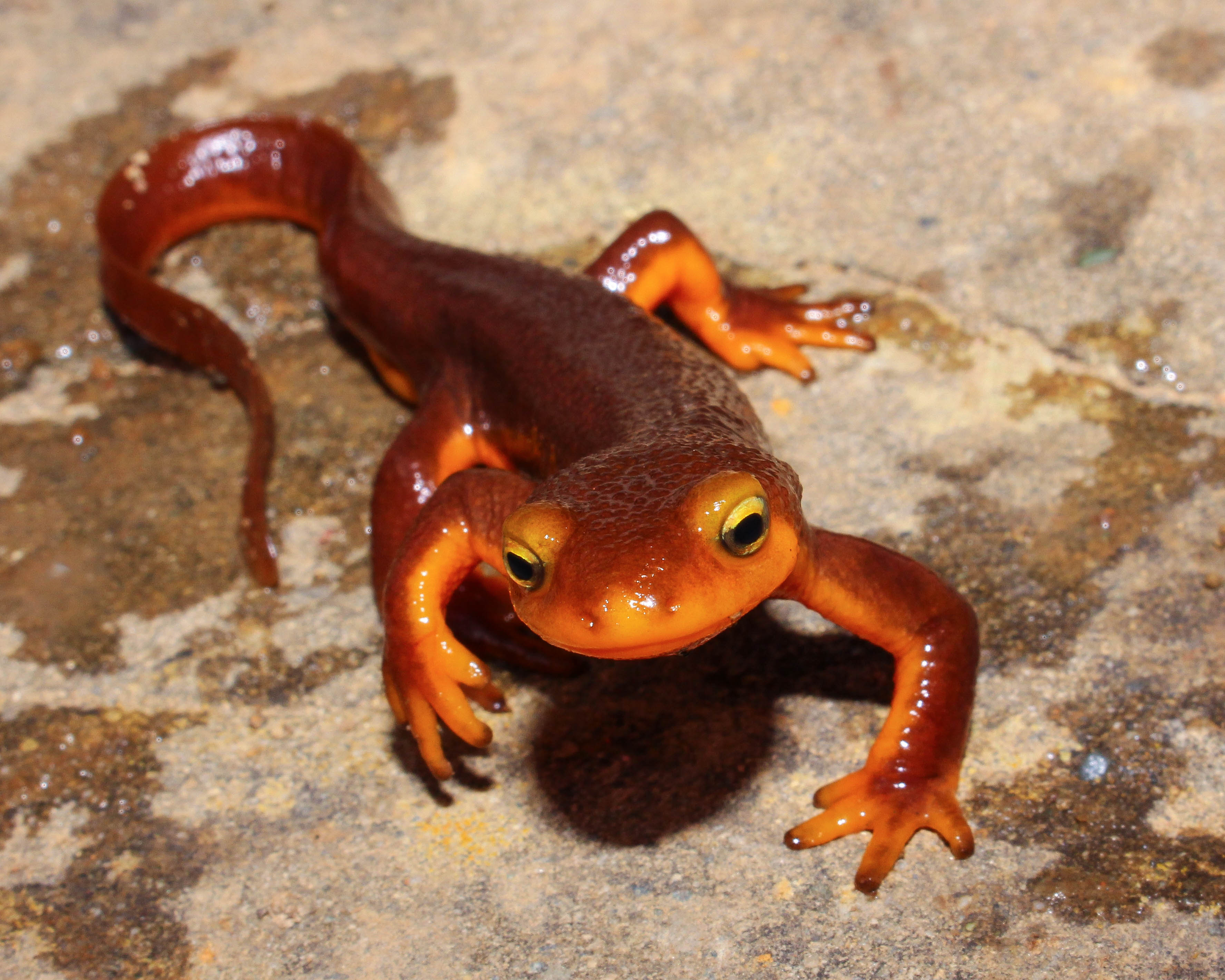
- Taricha torosa

Scientific classification
- Kingdom: Animalia
- Phylum: Chordata
- Class: Amphibia
- Order: Urodela
- Family: Salamandridae
- Subfamily: Pleurodelinae
- Genus: Taricha; Gray, 1950

Species
- Taricha granulosa Taricha rivularis Taricha sierrae Taricha torosa

= Taricha =

Western newts

Genus of amphibians

The genus Taricha consists of four species of highly toxic newts in the family Salamandridae. Their common name is Pacific newts, sometimes also western newts or roughskin newts. The four species within this genus are the California newt, the rough-skinned newt, the red-bellied newt, and the Sierra newt, all of which are found on the Pacific coastal region from southern Alaska to southern California, with one species possibly ranging into northern Baja California, Mexico.

== Species ==
Genus Taricha contains the following species:

Image	Scientific name	Common name	Distribution
	Taricha granulosa (Skilton, 1849)	Rough-skinned newt	West Coast of the United States and British Columbia from south to Santa Cruz, California, and north to Alaska
	Taricha rivularis (Twitty, 1935)	Red-bellied newt	northern California
	Taricha sierrae (Twitty, 1942)	Sierra newt	Sierra Nevada
	Taricha torosa (Rathke, 1833)	California newt	coastal counties of California and in the southern Sierra Nevada

== Differentiating between species ==
The rough-skinned newt and the California newt are very similar in appearance, and it can be extremely difficult to differentiate between the species. Both are light-brown to black on the upper body and orange to yellow on the underbelly. They have granulated skin, and they may grow to a length of eight inches. However, rough-skinned newts have small eyes with dark lower eyelids, while California newts have large eyes and light lower eyelids. Also, rough-skinned newts' upper teeth form a V shape, while those of the California newt form a Y shape, but this is difficult to ascertain on a living specimen.

The red-bellied newt is brown on the upper body with a red underbelly, has grainy skin, and grows to between 5.5 and 7.5 in (14 and 19 cm). It can be distinguished from other coastal newts, not only by its red belly, but also by the lack of yellow in its eyes. Breeding males develop smooth skin and a flattened tail.

== Behavior ==
Taricha spp. eat a diet largely consisting of invertebrates, though adults will also take fish and amphibian eggs. Most predators associate bright colors with poison (called aposematism), so if attacked, the newt will take up a defensive position, showing off the bright underbelly. Newts of this genus are primarily nocturnal, and may be either fully aquatic or semiaquatic. None are fully terrestrial as they must enter the water to breed. Juvenile newts, which are known as "efts", are primarily terrestrial until they reach sexual maturity.

== Toxicity ==
All species within the genus Taricha possess the biotoxin tetrodotoxin. However, toxicity varies between species and between populations within a species. In general, the rough-skinned newt is the most toxic species. Their populations in coastal Oregon and the San Francisco Bay Area are more toxic than those from Washington and elsewhere in California. Those on Vancouver Island, in British Columbia, possess little or no tetrodotoxin.

Taricha newts can be lethal to humans if ingested, and at least one human fatality occurred in Oregon from eating a rough-skinned newt. Eastern newts of the genus Notophthalmus (= Diemictylus of earlier authors) also secrete tetrodotoxin, but in lesser amounts. When handling Taricha specimens, the toxins should not be allowed to come in contact with broken skin or mucous membranes. Proper hand washing after handling should prevent any problems with ingestion of tetrodotoxin (as well as infection from Salmonella which newts may carry), though some individuals are known to be allergic to skin contact with the toxin.
