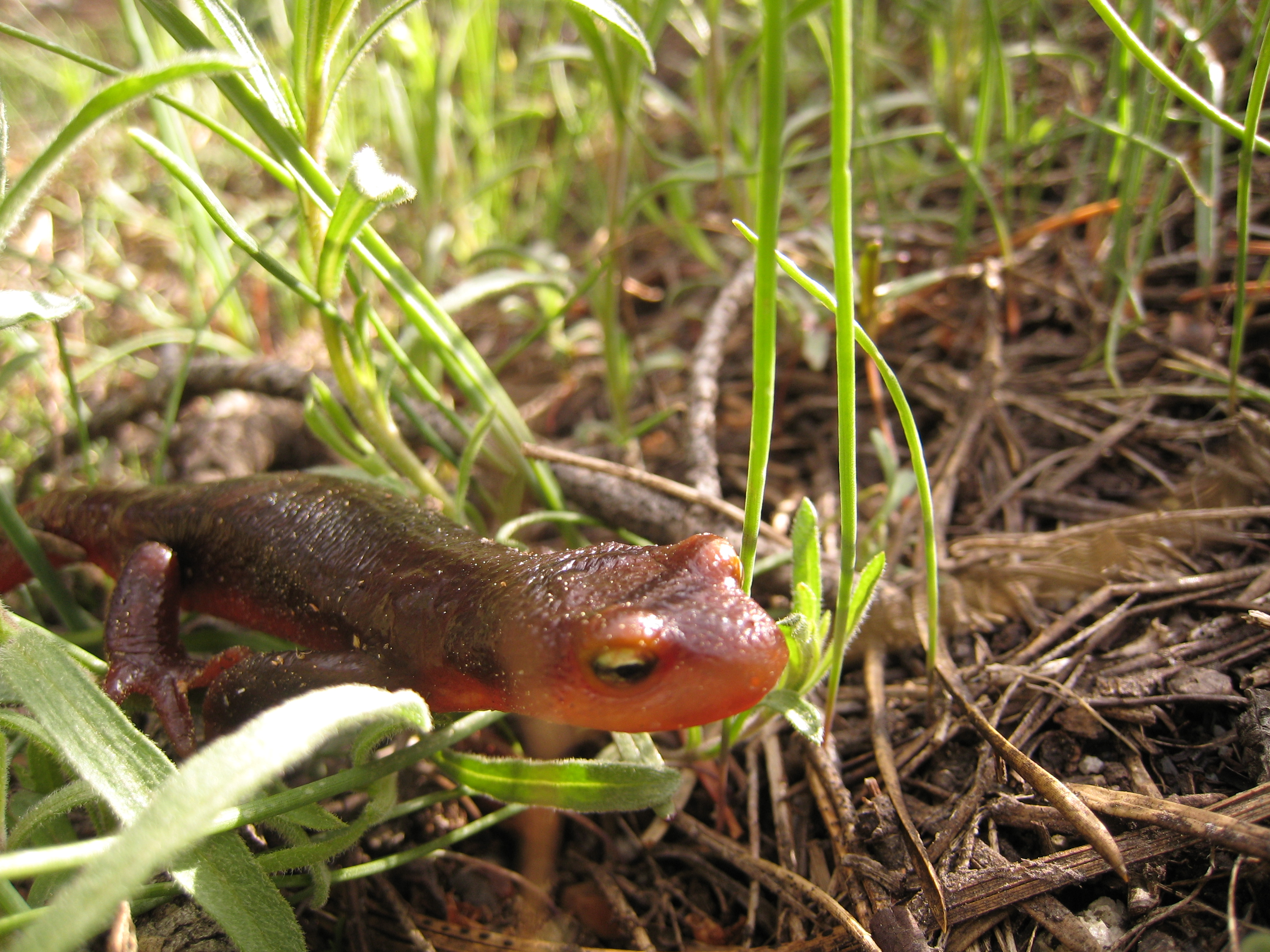

Conservation status
- Least Concern (IUCN 3.1)

Scientific classification
- Kingdom: Animalia
- Phylum: Chordata
- Class: Amphibia
- Order: Urodela
- Family: Salamandridae
- Genus: Taricha
- Species: T. sierrae

Binomial name
- Taricha sierrae (Twitty, 1942)
- IUCN range map for Taricha sierrae, Version 2021-2

= Sierra newt =

Sierra newt Taricha sierrae

Species of amphibian

The Sierra newt (Taricha sierrae) is a newt found west of the Sierra Nevada, from Shasta county to Tulare County, in California, Western North America.

Its adult length can range from 5 to 8 in (13 to 20 cm). Its skin produces a potent toxin.

Sierra Newts communicates with other through making a clicking noise.

== Subspecies ==
The Sierra newt was formerly regarded as a subspecies (Taricha torosa sierrae) of the California newt (Taricha torosa). In 2007 it was determined that the two represent "distinct evolutionary lineages". When looking at the Sierra Newt and California newt they possess different phenotypically. This is seen when looking at the head shape, color pattern, and the fact that patterns of differentiation in these characters are aligned with the genetic clines seen in the two newts.

== Range and habitat ==
Sierra newts exist primarily in between the Cascades and Sierra Nevada, up to about 2000m. They prefer less humid climates than the rough-skinned newts. The Sierra newt migrates between aquatic and terrestrial habitats seasonally. Outside the breeding season, the newts are land-dwelling, preferring rock crevices and logs, in habitats such as forests, woodlands, and shrub-lands. However, during breeding season, the newts will migrate to aquatic regions to mate and lay eggs.

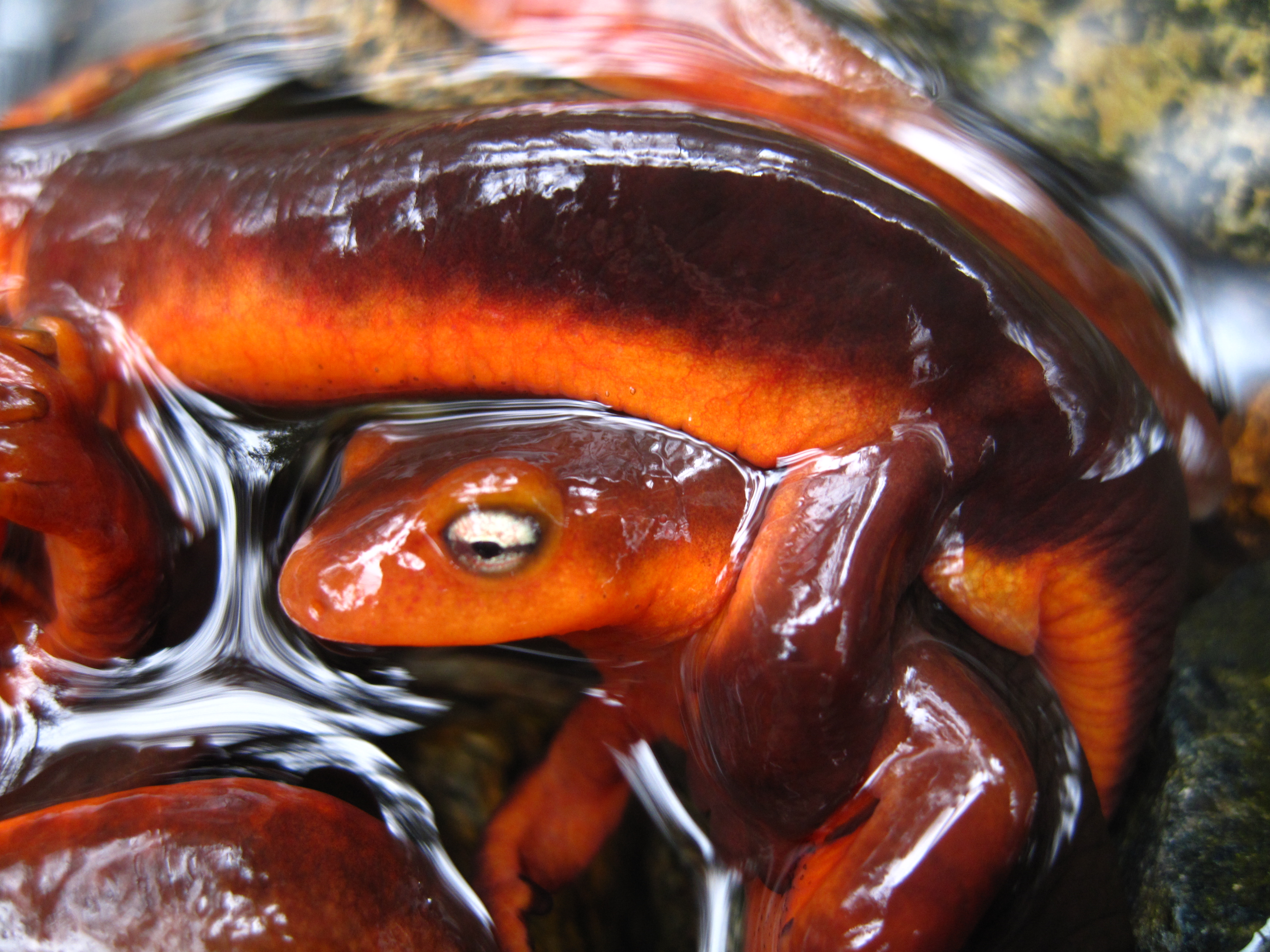

== Description ==
Appearance

The Adult Sierra newts coloring can be a yellowish-brown to dark brown, burnt orange, and sometimes yellowish. Their eyelids and the area below their eyes are lighter than the rest of the head. Their iris is light silvery to pale yellow. The eyes appear to extend to or beyond the outline of the head when viewed from above.

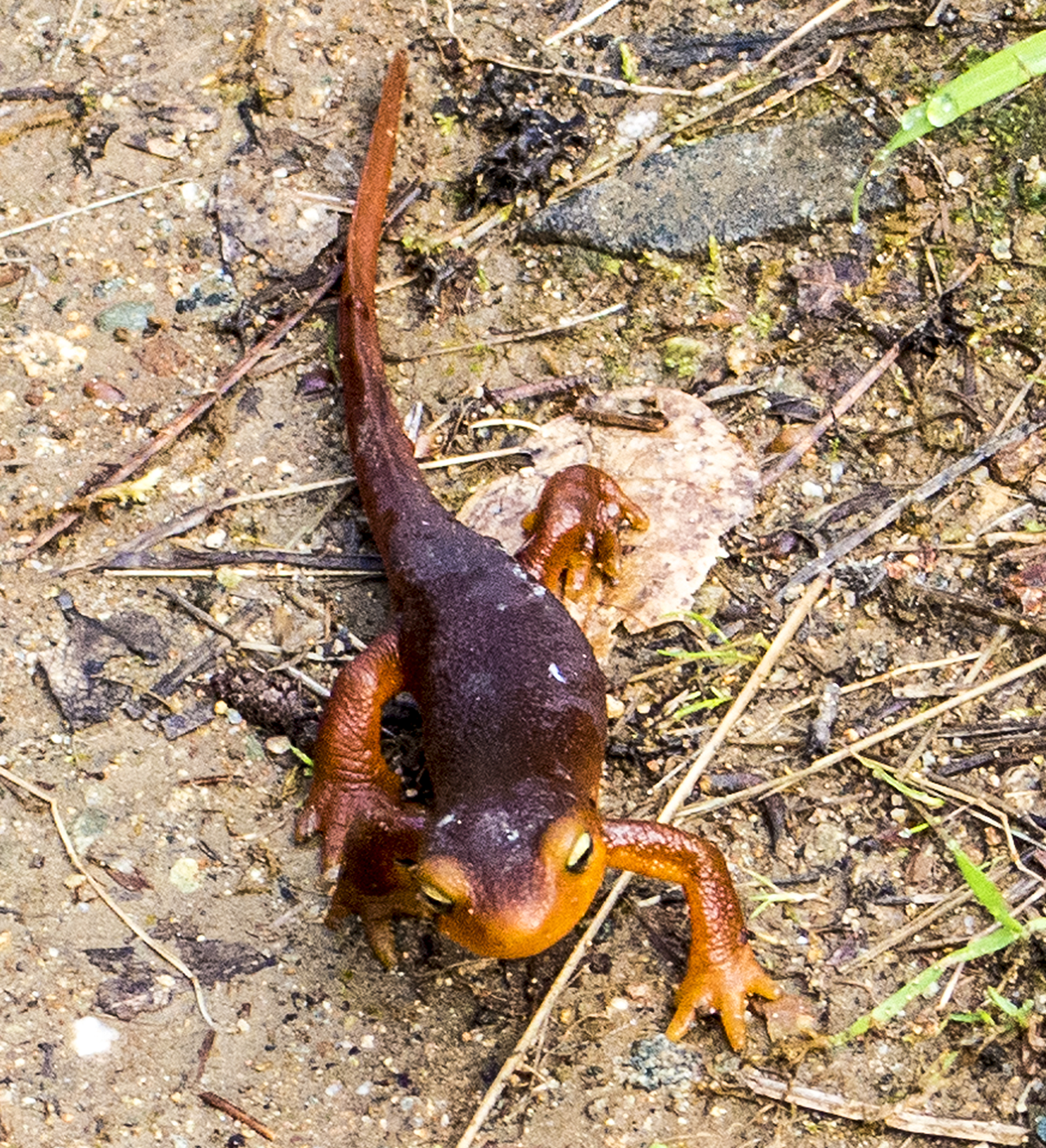
March 2013: Buttermilk Bend trail, South Yuba State Park

If a male is mating he will develop smooth skin, a flattened tail to aid with swimming, a swollen cloaca, and rough nuptial pads on the undersides of the feet to aid in holding onto females. The skin of females during the breeding season becomes more vascular, their tail may develop a small blade, and their vents become more prominent.

The aquatic larvae reside in the pond and are light yellow with two dark regular narrow bands on the back. In older larvae it is common to have dark spots or blotches along the sides of its body.

While it may seem that the reddish/orange underside coloring of the Sierra newts would draw attention to predators, it denotes to predators that they are poisonous and acts as a deterrent to predation.

=== Reproduction ===
Reproduction occurs generally between March and early May. Typically, the adult newts will return to the pool in which they hatched between January and February. After a mating dance, the male mounts the female and rubs his chin on her nose. He then attaches a spermatophore to the substrate, which she will retrieve into her cloaca.

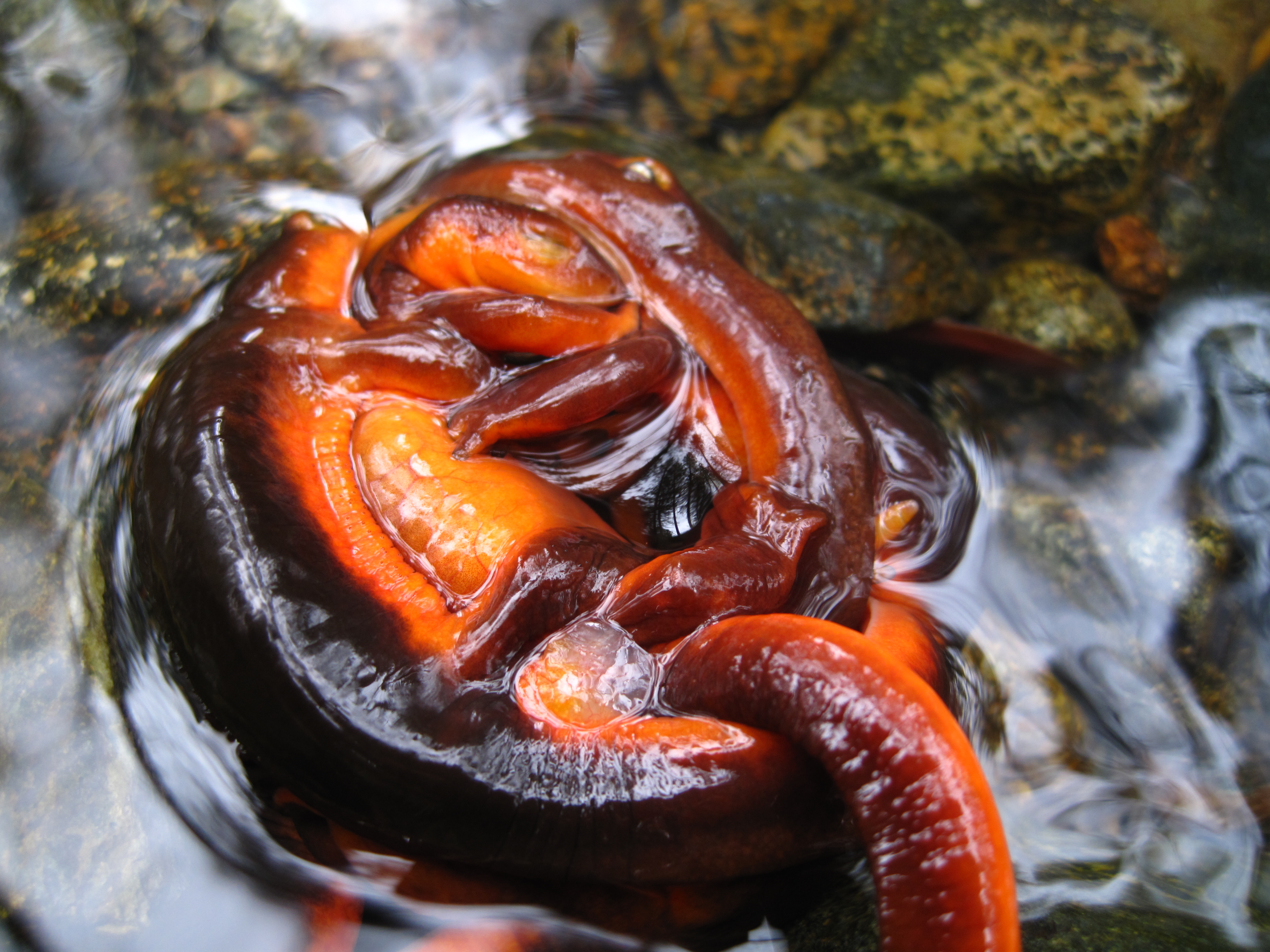
Sierra newts mating in stream at Woolman Semester in Nevada County, California

The egg mass released by the female contains between seven and 30 eggs, and is roughly the consistency of a thick gelatin dessert. Typically, the egg masses are attached to stream plant roots or to rocky crevices in small, pools of slow-moving water, but they have also been known to be attached to underwater rocks or leaf debris. While shallow in a wide sense, these pools are rather deep relative to the average depth of a Southern California stream, varying in depth from about 1–2 metres (3.3–6.6 ft).

Adult newts will stay in the pools throughout the breeding season, and can be occasionally found well into the summer. Larvae hatch sometime in early to midsummer, depending on local water temperature. However, the typical incubation length is between 14 and 52 days, varying primarily to water temperatures.

Larvae are difficult to find in streams, as they blend in well with the sandy bottom, to which they usually stay close. After the Larvae period which usually lasts till early fall or late summer, the newt will move to terrestrial habitats till they come back to reproduce in 5 to 8 years.

=== Toxicity and predation ===
When a predator nears, they will stand with their legs out to the side, their head raised back to expose the orange on the ventral surface and their tail will then go straight. This is known as the unken reflex and is seen in other amphibians.

Like other genus Taricha members, the glands in the skin of Taricha sierrae secrete the potent neurotoxin tetrodotoxin, which is hundreds of times more toxic than cyanide. This is the same toxin found in pufferfish and harlequin frogs. While tetrodotoxin was previously believed to be produced through a symbiotic relationship with bacteria, this has been disproved. This neurotoxin is strong enough to kill most vertebrates, including humans. However, it is dangerous only if ingested or gets into the bloodstream.

Sierra newts have few natural predators due to their high concentrations of tetrodotoxin. Garter snakes, particularly Thamnophis couchii and T. sirtalis, have adaptations which allow them to predate upon Taricha. The mutations in the snake's genes that allow toxin metabolism have resulted in selective pressure that favors newts that produce higher concentrations of tetrodotoxin. Increases in newt toxicity then apply a selective pressure favoring snakes with greater resistance. This evolutionary arms race has resulted in the newts producing levels of toxin far in excess of what is needed to kill any other conceivable predator.

=== Diet ===
Earthworms, snails, slugs, woodlice, bloodworms, mosquito larvae, crickets, other invertebrates, and trout eggs are among the Sierra newt's prey. In an aquarium habitat, earthworms provide the newt with all necessary nutrients. Other natural prey items would benefit the captive newt. Pellets tend to be inappropriate for terrestrial caudates, and fish food should be avoided completely.

== Conservation status ==
The Sierra Newt is listed as a species of least concern by the IUCN, but it is currently a California Special Concern species (DFG-CSC). However, the federal government has not given the Sierra newt any conservation status or listed as endangered or threatened. Some populations have been greatly reduced in southern California coastal streams due to the introduction of non-native, invasive species and human habitation. The mosquitofish (Gambusia affinis) and red swamp crayfish (Procambarus clarkii) have caused the greatest reduction in newt populations. Although the newts are highly toxic, P.clarkii will attack adults and attack and consume eggs and larvae. Their aggression also deters the newts from breeding. Manual removal of invasive crayfish is positively correlated with increasing newt population. Increased human activity has caused habitat loss or damage. Breeding ponds have been destroyed for development, and stream pools used for breeding have been destroyed by sedimentation caused by wildfire.
