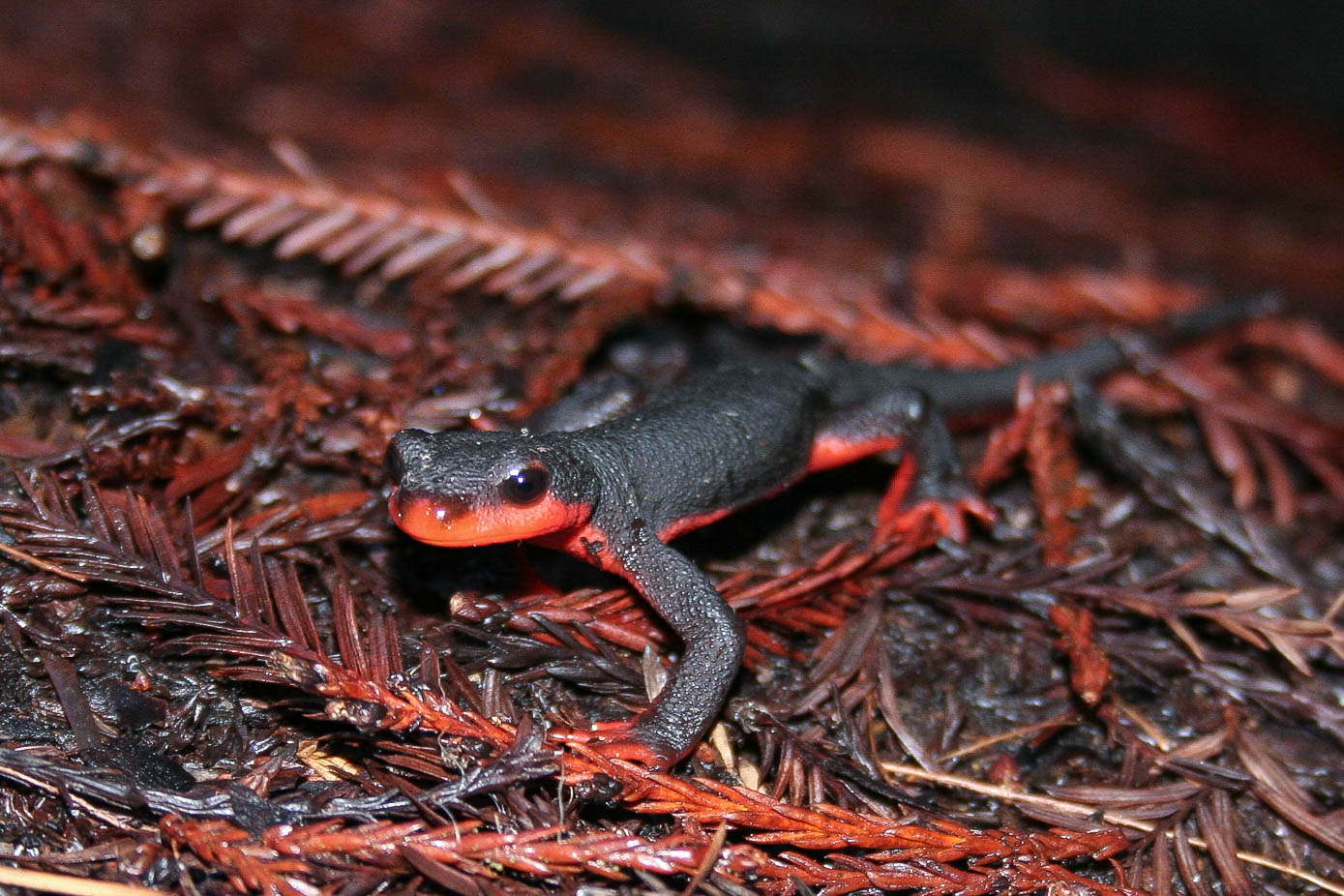

Conservation status
- Vulnerable (IUCN 3.1)

Scientific classification
- Kingdom: Animalia
- Phylum: Chordata
- Class: Amphibia
- Order: Urodela
- Family: Salamandridae
- Genus: Taricha
- Species: T. rivularis

Binomial name
- Taricha rivularis (Twitty, 1935)
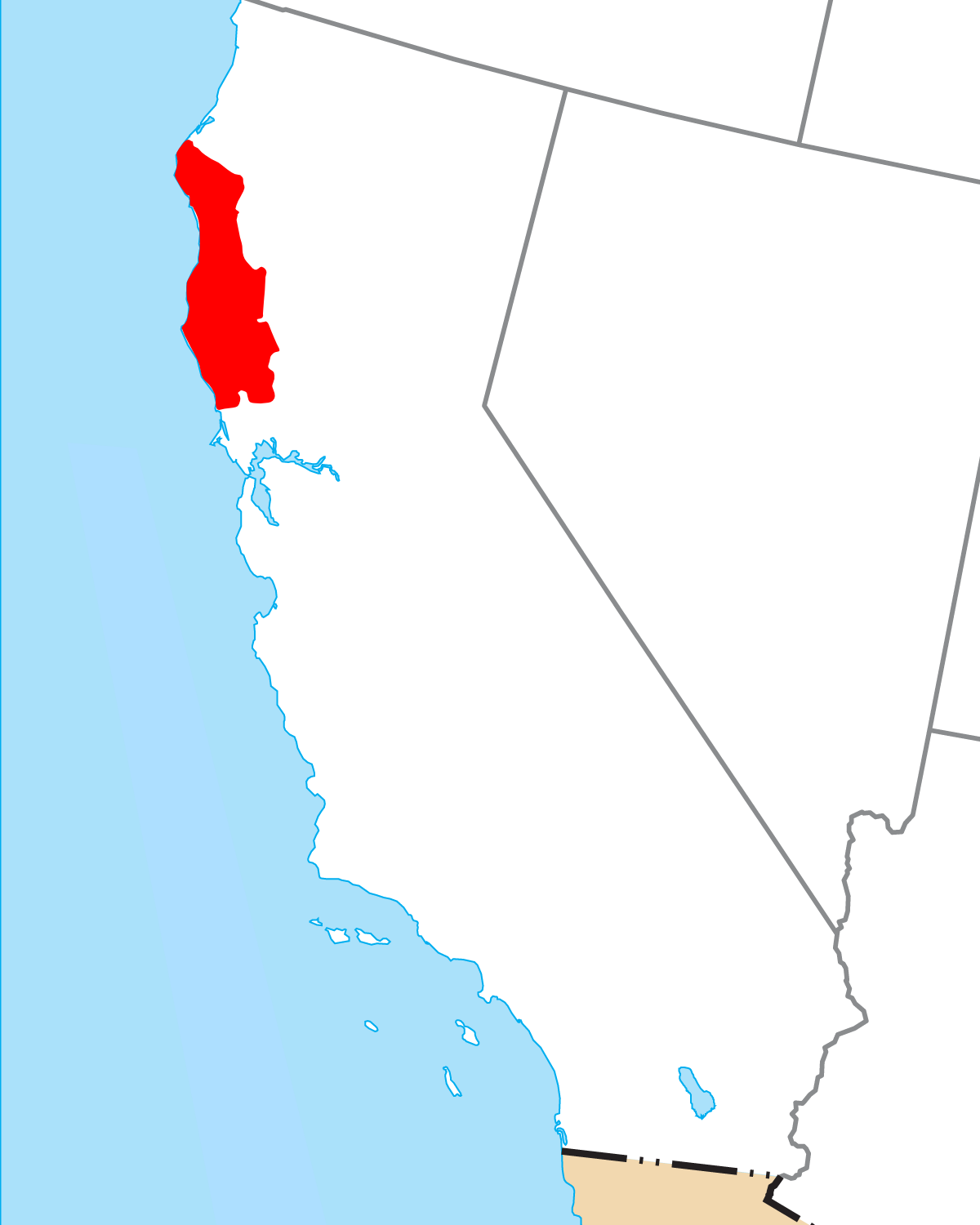
- Red-bellied newt distribution

= Red-bellied newt =

Species of amphibian

The red-bellied newt (Taricha rivularis) is a newt that is native to coastal woodlands in northern California and is terrestrial for most of its life.

== Description ==
When full grown, the red-bellied newt measures between 2.75 to 3.5 in (70 to 89 mm) from its nose to its vent, and between 5.5 and 7.5 in (140 and 190 mm) from its nose to its tail. It has grainy skin, and is brownish-black on top with a tomato-red underbelly. The male red-bellied newt often has a dark, broad coloring across the vent, while females do not. Breeding males develop smooth skin and a flattened tail. The red-bellied newt can be distinguished from other coastal newts by its red belly and a lack of yellow in its eyes.

== Distribution and habitat ==
The red-bellied newt is found in California along the coast from Bodega in Sonoma County, inland to Lower Lake, and north to Honeydew, Humboldt County. It lives in coastal woodlands, especially in redwood forests. There is a disjunct population 130 kilometres (81 mi) south of Sonoma County in the upper watershed of Stevens Creek in the Santa Cruz Mountains that is genetically identical to the Sonoma County population.

== Reproduction and ecology ==
Newts begin their lives as aquatic larvae similar to tadpoles, though elongated and with external gills. Once newt larvae mature into their adult form, which takes about four to six months, they will leave the water and live underground until they are ready to breed, which is typically in four to six years. Red-bellied newts can live for 20-30 years.

After reaching reproductive maturity, male red-bellied newts start congregating at stream banks as early as January or February. One to three weeks later, the females join them and the newts mate. Red-bellied newts lay their eggs in fast-flowing streams or rocky rivers. The females lay their eggs in about 12 streamlined clusters with six to 16 eggs each, and the eggs are typically attached to the bottoms of rocks, or on branches and roots leaning into the stream. When the adults leave the stream, instead of moving directly uphill, they move at an angle that leads them somewhat upstream. The females, unlike the males, do not breed every year.

== Homing ==
Red-bellied newts have a remarkable homing ability. They make great efforts to always go back to the same spot on the stream. They find their way over several miles of rugged terrain to get back to the spot. Likely, smell is responsible for the homing ability.

== Defense ==
Red-bellied newts have a brownish-black topside to avoid being noticed. When that fails, and they are seen and disturbed, they pull their heads and tails back to reveal their bright-red undersides. This serves as a warning to potential predators, as red-bellied newts have enough of a neurotoxin, tetrodotoxin, in their skin, eggs, and embryos to potentially kill an adult human, or 1,200 to 2,500 mice. Because red-bellied newts are so poisonous, they are nearly inedible and have no reported predators other than a few species of snake which are resistant to the toxin. Like other newts, red-bellied newts have the ability to regenerate several body parts, including their limbs, eyes, hearts, intestines, upper and lower jaws, and damaged spinal cords.
