= Species complex =

Group of closely related similar organisms

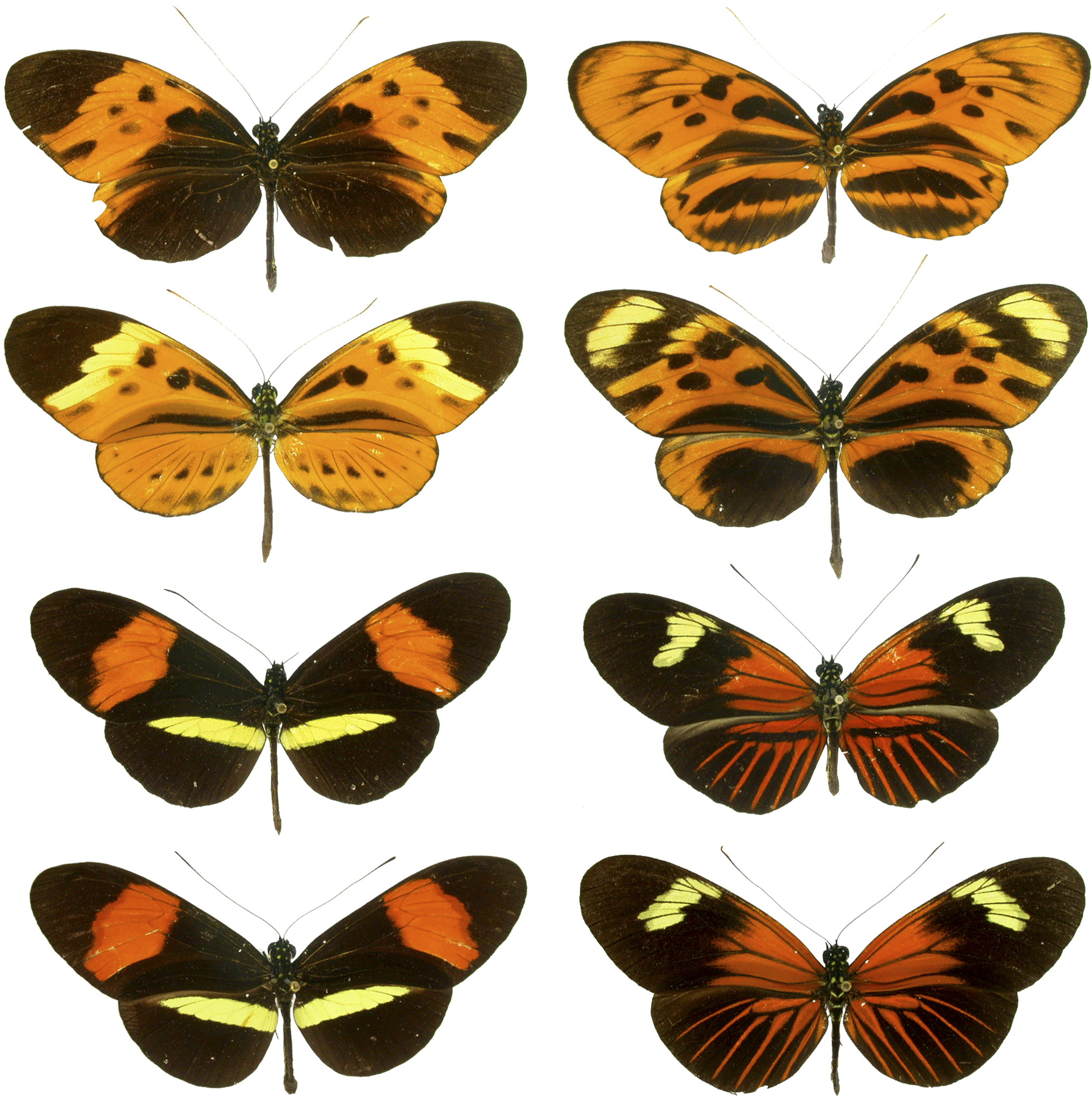
The butterfly genus Heliconius contains some species that are extremely difficult to tell apart.

In biology, a species complex is a group of closely related organisms that are so similar in appearance and other features that the boundaries between them are often unclear. The taxa in the complex may be able to hybridize readily with each other, further blurring any distinctions. Terms that are sometimes used synonymously but have more precise meanings are cryptic species for two or more species hidden under one species name, sibling species for two (or more) species that are each other's closest relative, and species flock for a group of closely related species that live in the same habitat. As informal taxonomic ranks, species group, species aggregate, macrospecies, and superspecies are also in use.

Two or more taxa that were once considered conspecific (of the same species) may later be subdivided into infraspecific taxa (taxa within a species, such as plant varieties), which may be a complex ranking but it is not a species complex. In most cases, a species complex is a monophyletic group of species with a common ancestor, but there are exceptions. It may represent an early stage after speciation in which the species were separated for a long time period without evolving morphological differences. Hybrid speciation can be a component in the evolution of a species complex.

Species complexes are ubiquitous and are identified by the rigorous study of differences between individual species that uses minute morphological details, tests of reproductive isolation, or DNA-based methods, such as molecular phylogenetics and DNA barcoding. The existence of extremely similar species may cause local and global species diversity to be underestimated. The recognition of similar-but-distinct species is important for disease and pest control and in conservation biology although the drawing of dividing lines between species can be inherently difficult.

== Definition ==
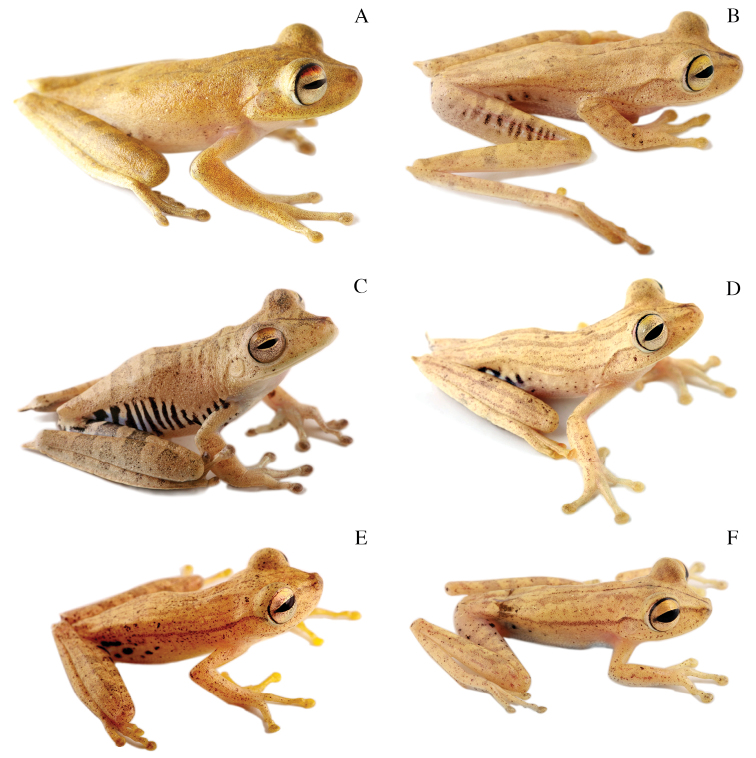
At least six treefrog species make up the Hypsiboas calcaratus–fasciatus species complex.

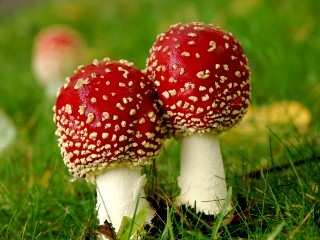
The fly agaric comprises several cryptic species, as is shown by genetic data.

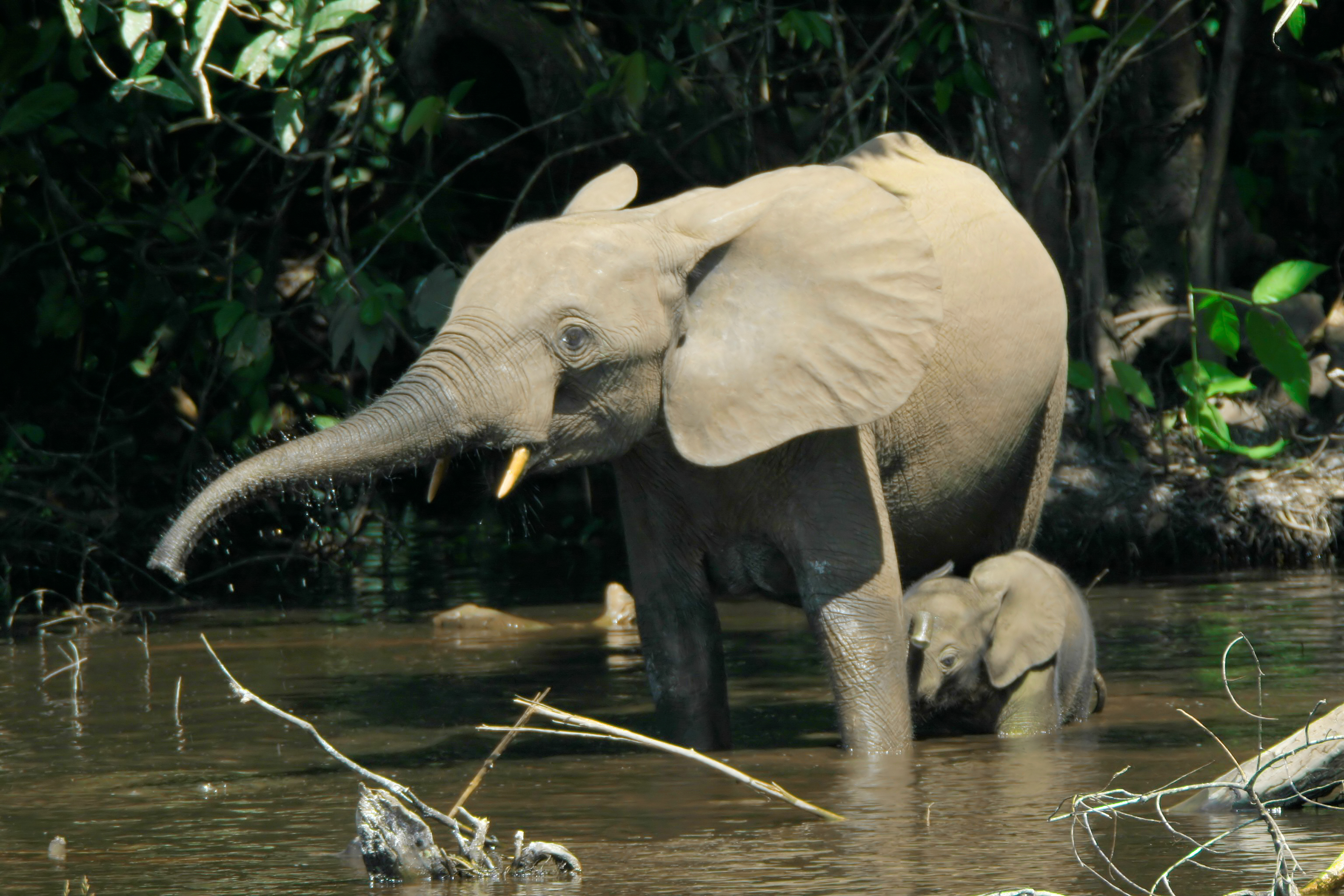
The forest elephant (shown) is the bush elephant's sibling species.

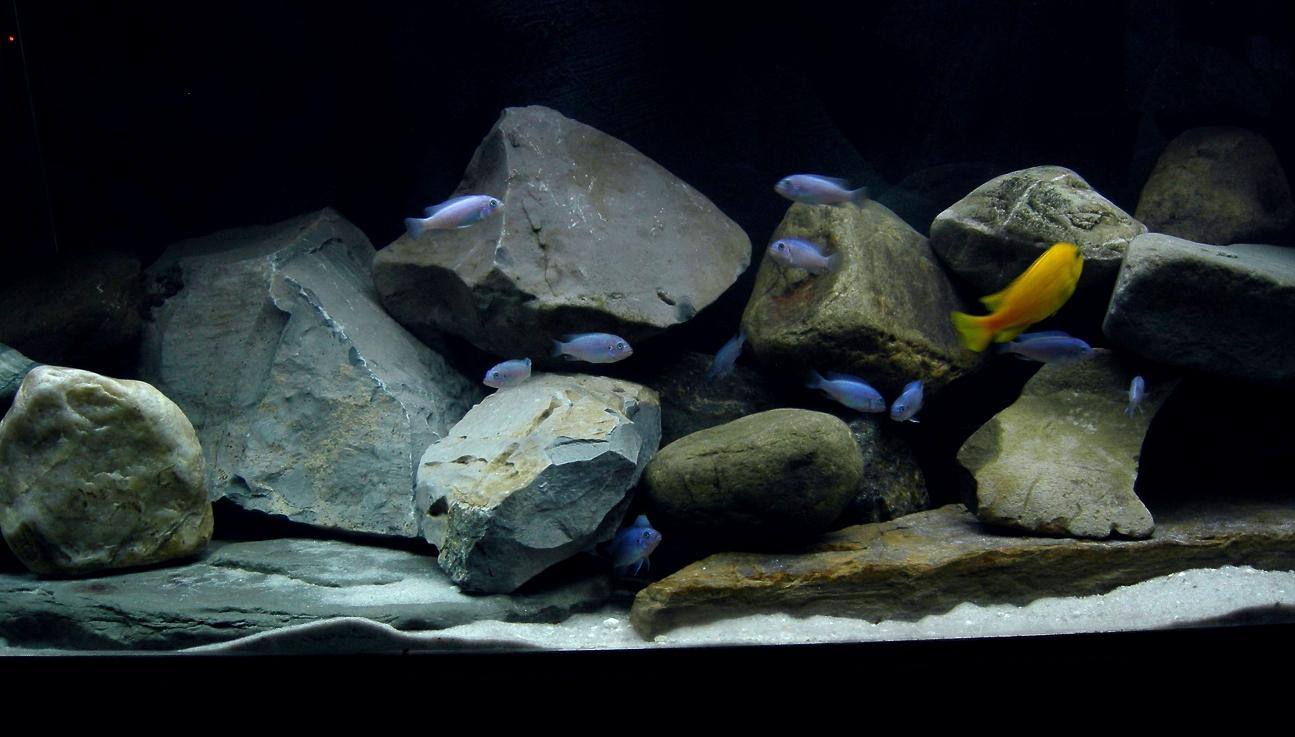
Mbuna cichlids form a species flock in Lake Malawi.

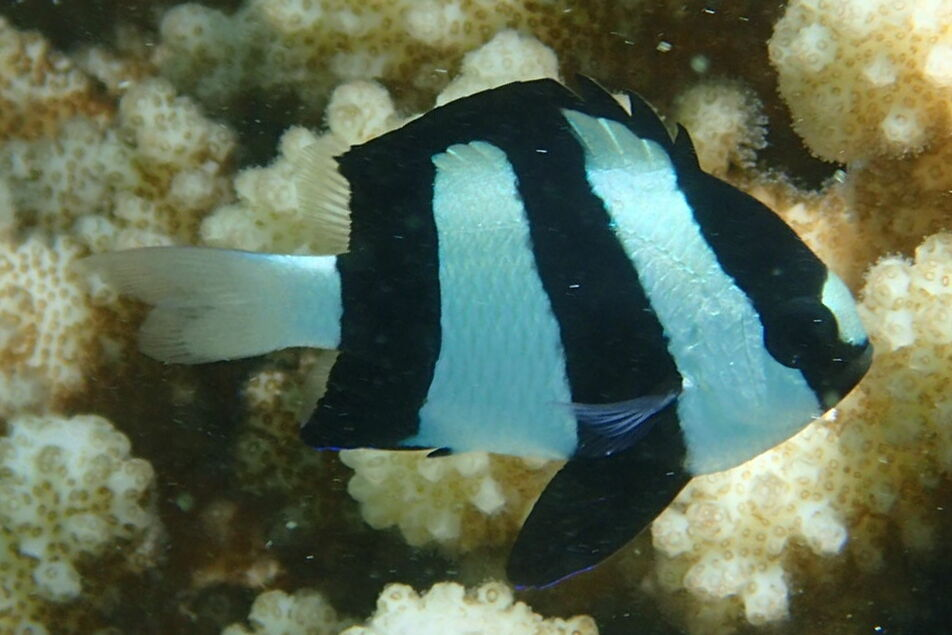
Dascyllus emamo is a cryptic species...

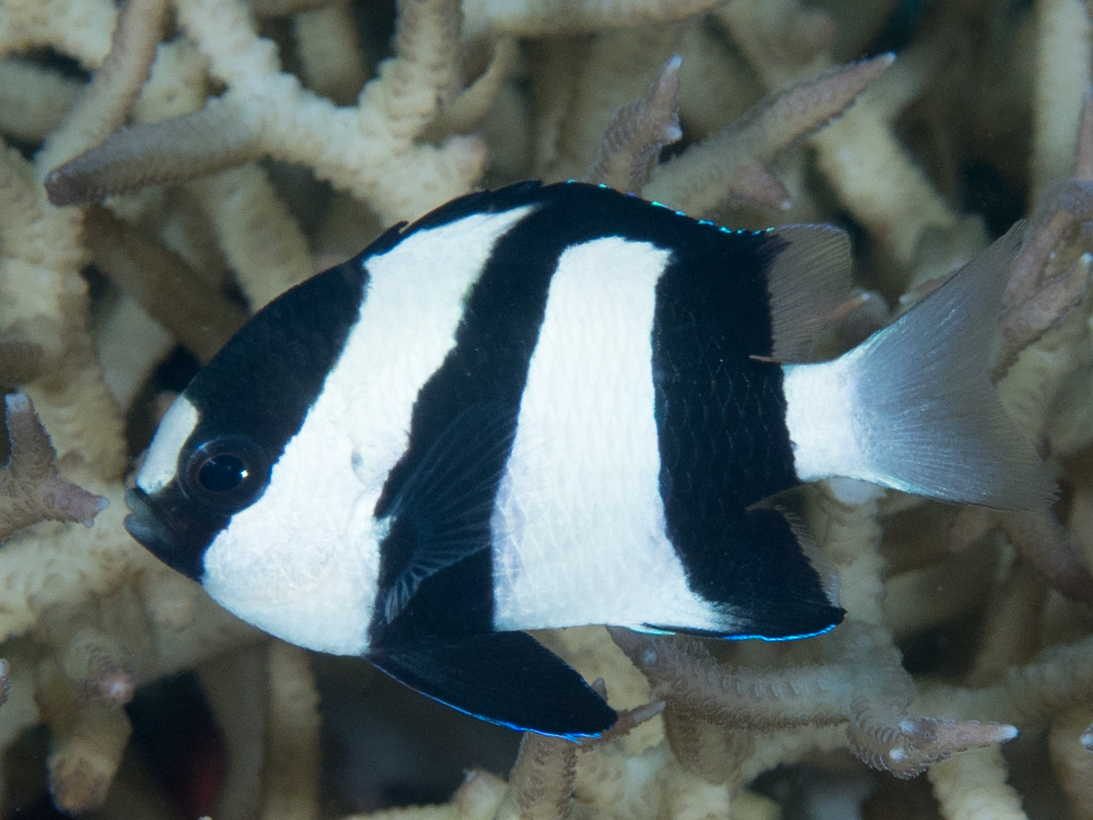
... appearing identical to Dascyllus aruanus.

A species complex is typically considered as a group of close, but distinct species. The concept is closely tied to the definition of a species. Modern biology understands a species as "separately evolving metapopulation lineage" but acknowledges that the criteria to delimit species may depend on the group studied. Thus, many traditionally defined species, based only on morphological similarity, have been found to be several distinct species when other criteria, such as genetic differentiation or reproductive isolation, are applied.

A more restricted use applies the term to a group of species among which hybridisation has occurred or is occurring, which leads to intermediate forms and blurred species boundaries. The informal classification, superspecies, can be exemplified by the grizzled skipper butterfly, which is a superspecies that is further divided into three subspecies.

Some authors apply the term to a species with intraspecific variability, which might be a sign of ongoing or incipient speciation. Examples are ring species or species with subspecies, in which it is often unclear if they should be considered separate species.

=== Related concepts ===
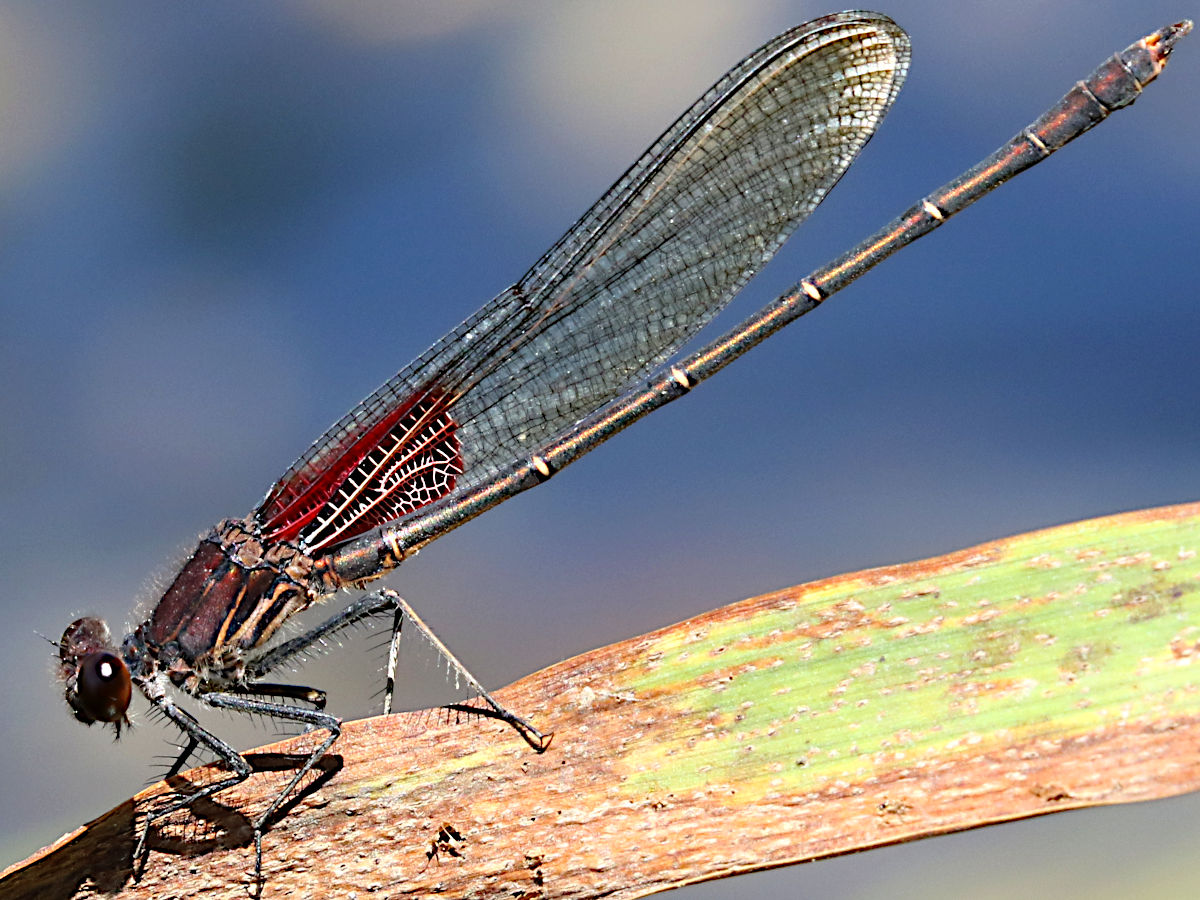
The rubyspot damselfly Hetaerina americana is suspected to be a cryptic complex with at least one other species of rubyspot.

Several terms are used synonymously for a species complex, but some of them may also have slightly different or narrower meanings. In the nomenclature codes of zoology and bacteriology, no taxonomic ranks are defined at the level between subgenus and species, but the botanical code defines four ranks below subgenus (section, subsection, series, and subseries). Different informal taxonomic solutions have been used to indicate a species complex, including the Zoological Code's accommodation for the use of the term superspecies, but aside from an explanation for how such a name is to be written (e.g., Ornithoptera (superspecies priamus); Art. 6.2), since there is no type species for a superspecies, they have no formal nomenclatural standing.

Cryptic species
Cryptic species, also known as sibling species, are morphologically identical lineages of a species that are genetically distinct. More generally, the term is often applied when species, even if they are known to be distinct, cannot be reliably distinguished by morphology. Rather, these lineages can be distinguished by use of DNA barcoding and metabarcoding sequences in a particular region of the genome.
Cryptic species are often sexually isolated; less so because they are unable to mate with one another but rather due to geography and slight differences in breeding behavior or chemical signals. Cryptic species may arise not only from true morphological similarity but also because high within-species variation can obscure differences between species, making divergent lineages appear deceptively similar.
Species flock
A species flock—also known as a species swarm—occurs when, in a limited geographic area, a single species evolves into multiple distinct species which each fill their own ecological niche. Similarly, a superspecies can be described as a species that diverges into specific species in isolation and then remains geographically or reproductively isolated. The main difference between a cryptic or sibling species and a species flock or superspecies is that while the former is very nearly indistinguishable, the latter can be identified morphologically. A species flock should not be confused with a mixed-species foraging flock, a behavior in which birds of different species feed together.
Species aggregate
Used for a species complex, especially in plant taxa where polyploidy and apomixis are common. Historical synonyms are species collectiva [la], introduced by Adolf Engler, conspecies, and grex. Components of a species aggregate have been called segregates or microspecies. Used as abbreviation agg. after the binomial species name.
A species aggregate is very similar in definition to that of a species complex, a term to describe a group of organisms in the stages of speciation, where the species involved may be morphologically identical, much like a cryptic species, or distinct, much like a species flock. The term is most used in plant biology, and is a synonym for the more utilized species flock.
Sensu lato
A Latin phrase meaning 'in the broad sense', it is often used after a binomial species name, often abbreviated as s.l., to indicate a species complex represented by that species.
Genus complex
A group of closely-related genera, analogous to the species complex but at a higher taxonomic rank. For example, Lactobacillus has been described as part of a genus complex comprising five other genera that are also descended from the concestor of Lactobacillus species. Similarly, the relatedness of the weevil genus Exophthalmus to a number of similar genera has been under long dispute, and the group of genera in question has been described as a genus complex.

== Identification ==
Distinguishing close species within a complex requires the study of often very small differences. Morphological differences may be minute and visible only by the use of adapted methods, such as microscopy. However, distinct species sometimes have no morphological differences. In those cases, other characters, such as in the species' life history, behavior, physiology, and karyology, may be explored. For example, territorial songs are indicative of species in the treecreepers, a bird genus with few morphological differences. Mating tests are common in some groups such as fungi to confirm the reproductive isolation of two species.

Analysis of DNA sequences is becoming increasingly standard for species recognition and may, in many cases, be the only useful method. Different methods are used to analyse such genetic data, such as molecular phylogenetics or DNA barcoding. Such methods have greatly contributed to the discovery of cryptic species, including such emblematic species as the fly agaric, the water fleas, or the African elephants.

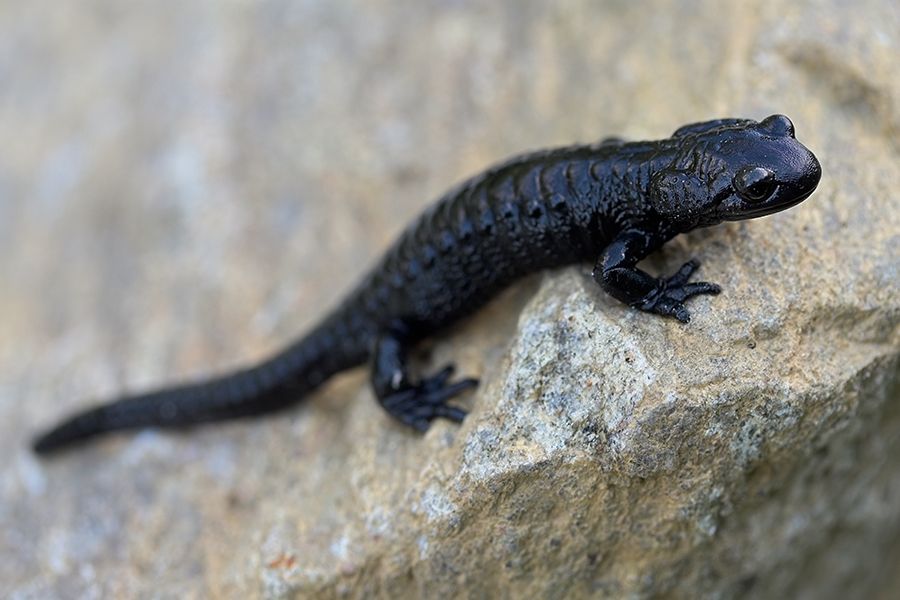
Salamandra atra

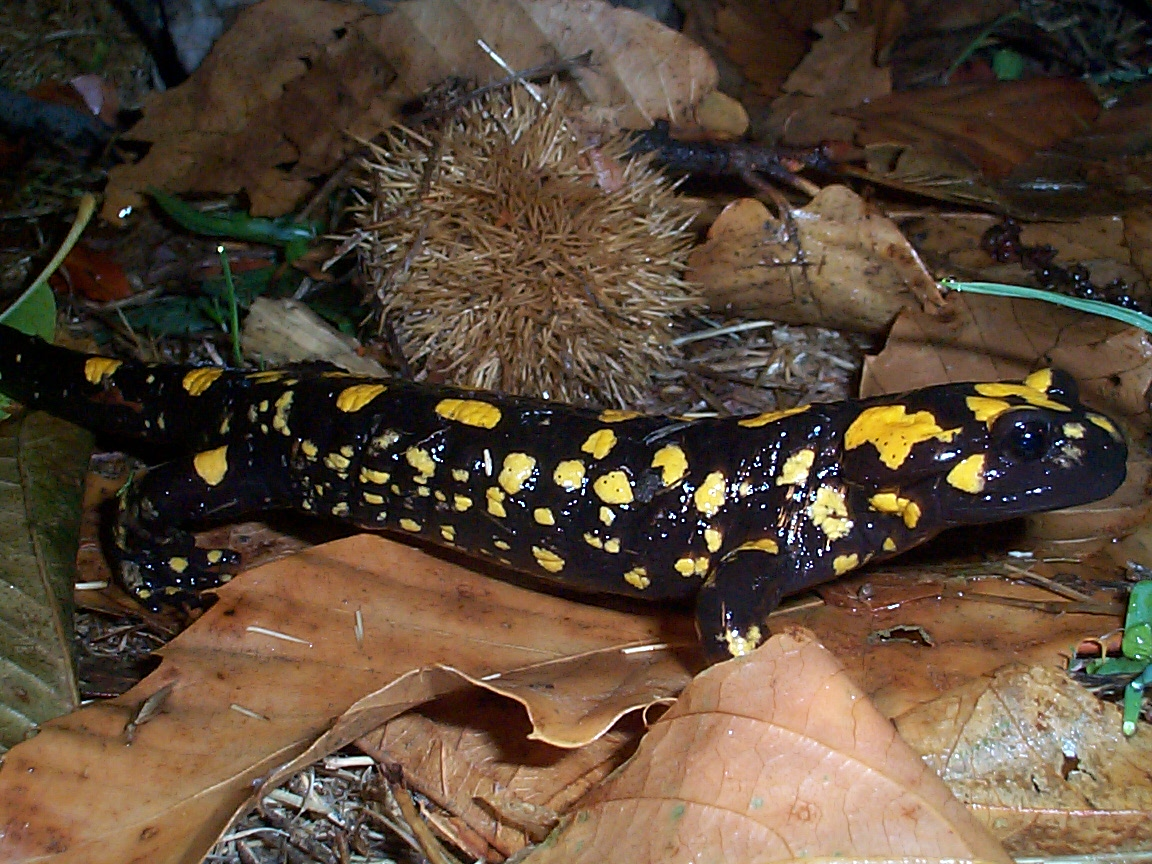
Salamandra corsica

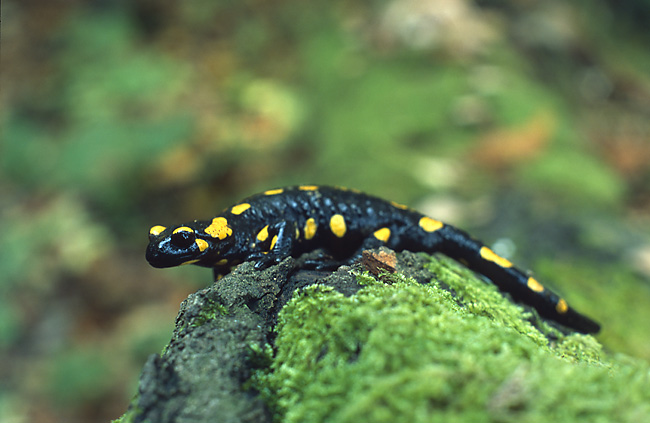
Salamandra salamandra

Similarity can be misleading: the Corsican fire salamander (center) was previously considered a subspecies of the fire salamander (right) but is in fact more closely related to the uniformly black Alpine salamander (left).

== Evolution and ecology ==
=== Speciation process ===
A species complex typically forms a monophyletic group that has diversified rather recently, as is shown by the short branches between the species A–E (blue box) in this phylogenetic tree.

Species forming a complex have typically diverged very recently from each other, which sometimes allows the retracing of the process of speciation. Species with differentiated populations, such as ring species, are sometimes seen as an example of early, ongoing speciation: a species complex in formation. Nevertheless, similar but distinct species have sometimes been isolated for a long time without evolving differences, a phenomenon known as "morphological stasis". For example, the Amazonian frog Pristimantis ockendeni is actually at least three different species that diverged over 5 million years ago.

Stabilizing selection has been invoked as a force maintaining similarity in species complexes, especially when they adapted to special environments (such as a host in the case of symbionts or extreme environments). This may constrain possible directions of evolution; in such cases, strongly divergent selection is not to be expected. Also, asexual reproduction, such as through apomixis in plants, may separate lineages without producing a great degree of morphological differentiation.

Possible processes explaining similarity of species in a species complex: a – morphological stasis b – hybrid speciation

A species complex is usually a group that has one common ancestor (a monophyletic group), but closer examination can sometimes disprove that. For example, yellow-spotted "fire salamanders" in the genus Salamandra, formerly all classified as one species S. salamandra, are not monophyletic: the Corsican fire salamander's closest relative has been shown to be the entirely black Alpine salamander. In such cases, similarity has arisen from convergent evolution.

Hybrid speciation can lead to unclear species boundaries through a process of reticulate evolution, in which species have two parent species as their most recent common ancestors. In such cases, the hybrid species may have intermediate characters, such as in Heliconius butterflies. Hybrid speciation has been observed in various species complexes, such as insects, fungi, and plants. In plants, hybridization often takes place through polyploidization, and hybrid plant species are called nothospecies.

=== Range and habitats ===
Sources differ on whether or not members of a species group share a range. A source from Iowa State University Department of Agronomy states that members of a species group usually have partially overlapping ranges but do not interbreed with one another. A Dictionary of Zoology (Oxford University Press 1999) describes a species group as complex of related species that exist allopatrically and explains that the "grouping can often be supported by experimental crosses in which only certain pairs of species will produce hybrids." The examples given below may support both uses of the term "species group."

Often, such complexes do not become evident until a new species is introduced into the system, which breaks down existing species barriers. An example is the introduction of the Spanish slug in Northern Europe, where interbreeding with the local black slug and red slug, which were traditionally considered clearly separate species that did not interbreed, shows that they may just be subspecies of the same species.

Where closely related species co-exist in sympatry, it is often a particular challenge to understand how the similar species persist without outcompeting each other. Niche partitioning is one mechanism invoked to explain that. Indeed, studies in some species complexes suggest that species divergence have gone in par with ecological differentiation, with species now preferring different microhabitats. Similar methods also found that the Amazonian frog Eleutherodactylus ockendeni is actually at least three different species that diverged over 5 million years ago.

A species flock may arise when a species penetrates a new geographical area and diversifies to occupy a variety of ecological niches, a process known as adaptive radiation. The first species flock to be recognized as such was the 13 species of Darwin's finches on the Galápagos Islands described by Charles Darwin.

== Practical implications ==
=== Biodiversity estimates ===
It has been suggested that cryptic species complexes are very common in the marine environment. That suggestion came before the detailed analysis of many systems using DNA sequence data but has been proven to be correct. The increased use of DNA sequence in the investigation of organismal diversity (also called phylogeography and DNA barcoding) has led to the discovery of a great many cryptic species complexes in all habitats. In the marine bryozoan Celleporella hyalina, detailed morphological analyses and mating compatibility tests between the isolates identified by DNA sequence analysis were used to confirm that these groups consisted of more than 10 ecologically distinct species, which had been diverging for many millions of years.

=== Disease and pathogen control ===
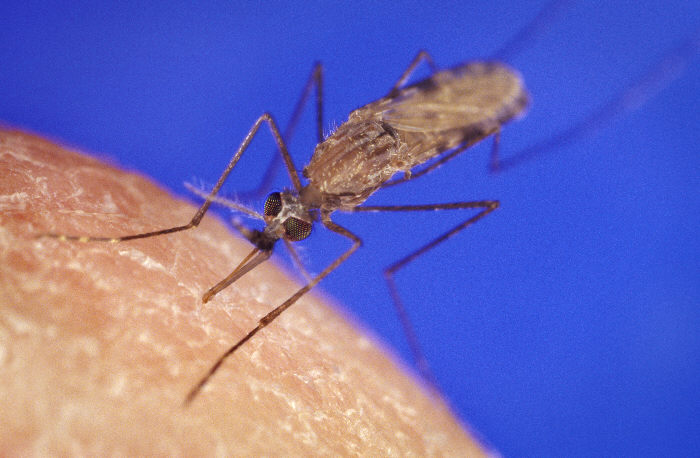
The Anopheles gambiae mosquito complex contains both species that are a vector for malaria and species that are not.

Pests, species that cause diseases and their vectors, have direct importance for humans. When they are found to be cryptic species complexes, the ecology and the virulence of each of these species need to be re-evaluated to devise appropriate control strategies as their diversity increases the capacity for more dangerous strains to develop. Examples are cryptic species in the malaria vector genus of mosquito, Anopheles, the fungi causing cryptococcosis, and sister species of Bactrocera tryoni, or the Queensland fruit fly. That pest is indistinguishable from two sister species except that B. tryoni inflicts widespread, devastating damage to Australian fruit crops, but the sister species do not.

=== Conservation biology ===
When a species is found to be several phylogenetically distinct species, each typically has smaller distribution ranges and population sizes than had been reckoned. The different species can also differ in their ecology, such as by having different breeding strategies or habitat requirements, which must be taken into account for appropriate management. For example, giraffe populations and subspecies differ genetically to such an extent that they may be considered species. Although the giraffe, as a whole, is not considered to be threatened, if each cryptic species is considered separately, there is a much higher level of threat.

== See also ==
- Glossary of scientific naming
- Alliance (taxonomy)
- Association (ecology)
- Subspecies
- Ring species
