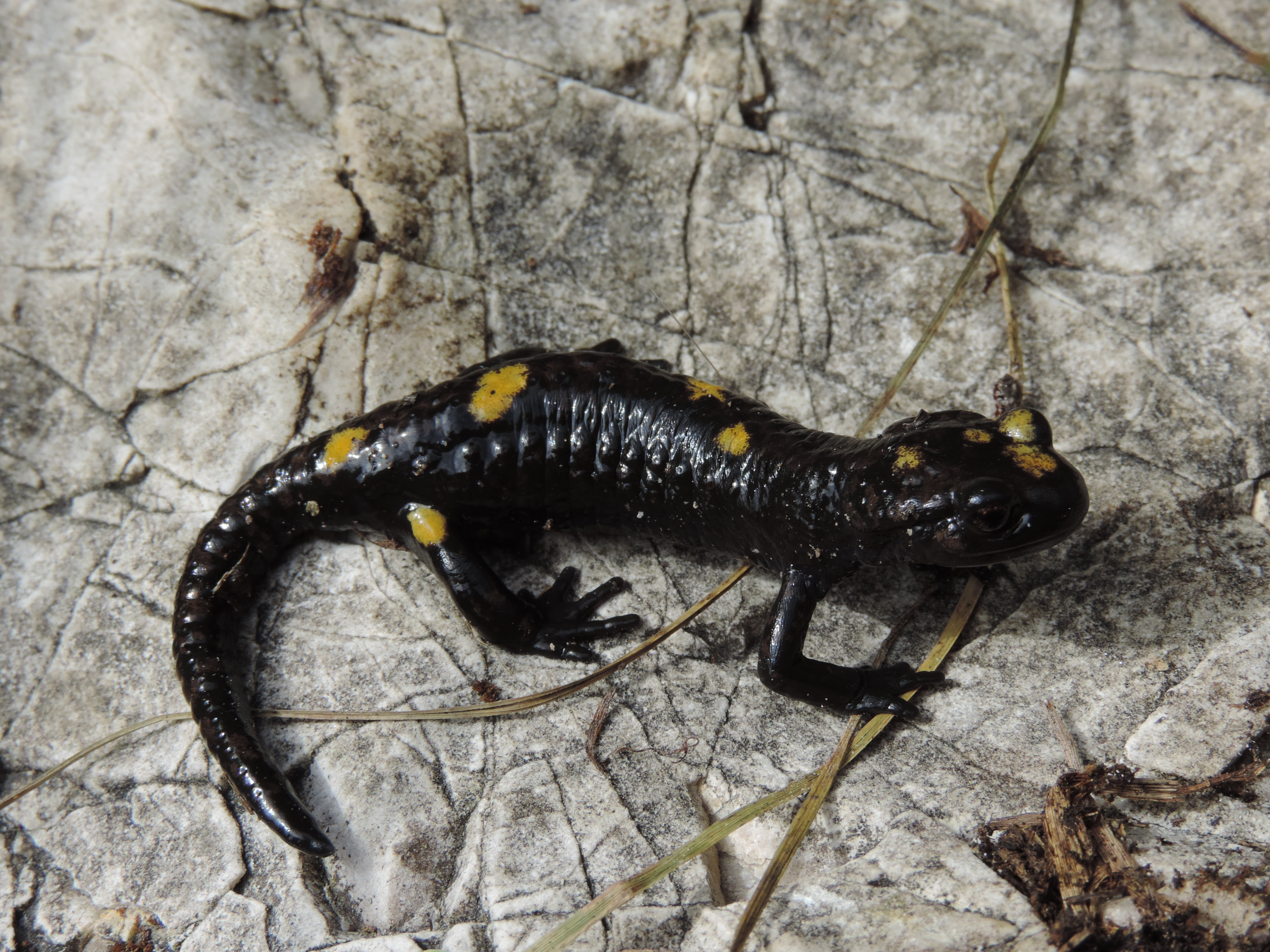

Scientific classification
- Domain: Eukaryota
- Kingdom: Animalia
- Phylum: Chordata
- Class: Amphibia
- Order: Urodela
- Family: Salamandridae
- Genus: Salamandra
- Species: S. atra
- Subspecies: S. a. pasubiensis

Trinomial name
- Salamandra atra pasubiensis Bonato & Steinfartz, 2005

= Salamandra atra pasubiensis =

Subspecies of amphibian

Salamandra atra pasubiensis is a subspecies of the alpine salamander Salamandra atra found in south-eastern Italian Prealps.

== Morphology ==
Salamandra atra pasubiensis differs from all other subspecies of S. atra in the individual variability of the body colour. The body surface is mainly uniformly black, with a variable number and extent of yellow and brown patches on the dorsal surface of the head, the trunk, the limbs and the tail. The patches are very similar to those found in S. atra aurorae, however much smaller and covering only a minor part of the dorsal surface. Extent and arrangement of the patches are highly variable between individuals, some of which are even entirely black, like in S. atra atra and S. a. prenjensis. The colour pattern is established at birth and it is assumed to change only slightly with growth, like in S. atra aurorae.

The sexual dimorphism is very slight. Like in other subspecies of S. atra, the cloacal region is usually swollen in the adult males.

== Distribution ==
Salamandra atra pasubiensis lives only on the Pasubio massif, in the Venetian Prealps, Northeast Italy. All documented and reliable records are from two adjacent small valleys on the southern slope of the massif, and refer most probably to a single population. The known area of occupancy is less than 2 km^{2} and the altitudinal range is 1450–1800 m.

There are a few other reports of alpine salamanders from other parts on the Pasubio massif and from the nearby Carega massif, but all these records are unconfirmed.

== Threats, conservation status and management ==
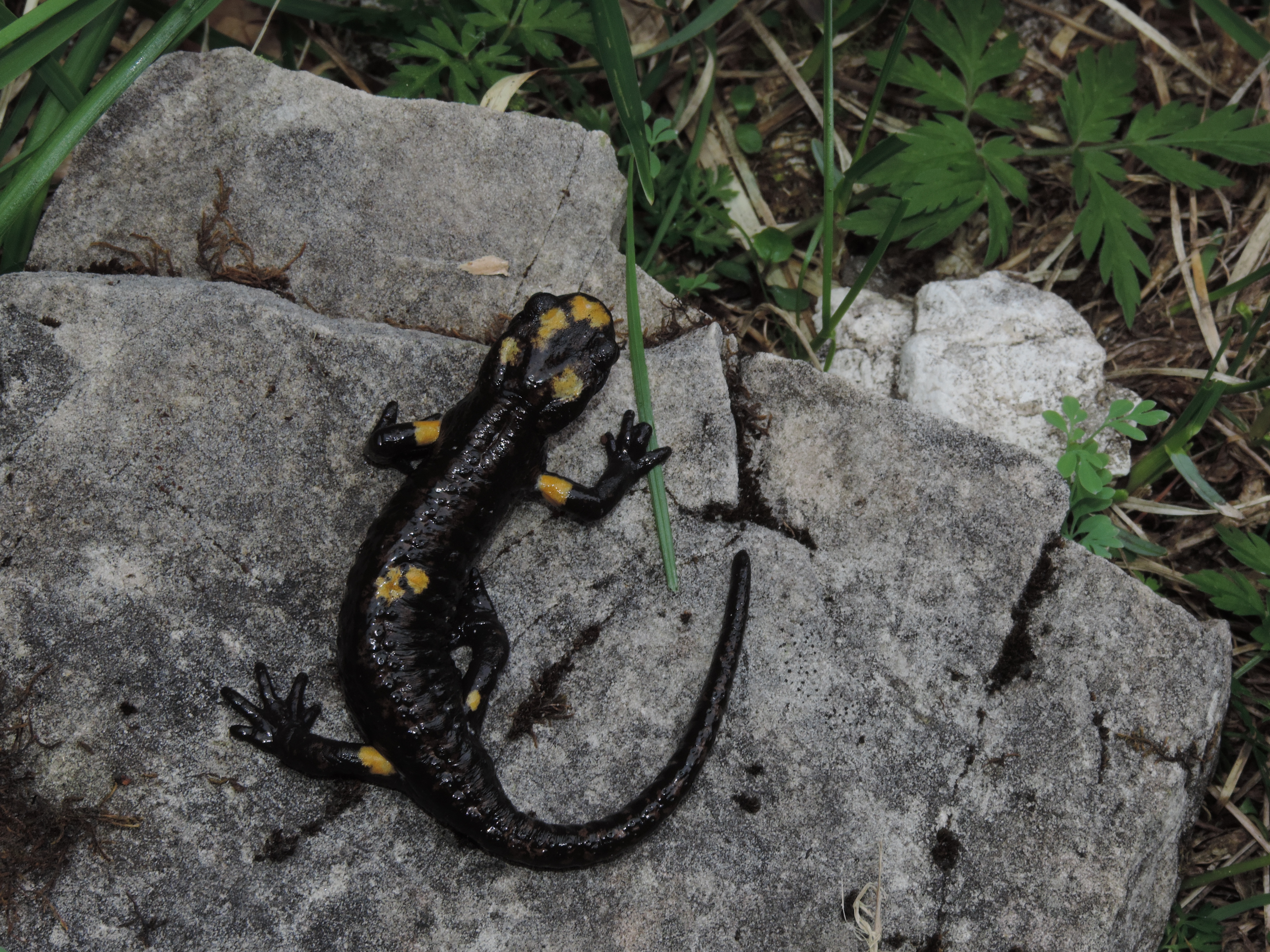
Salamandra atra pasubiensis, Monte Pasubio, July 2016

The rocky, steep valleys inhabited by S. atra pasubiensis are only marginally exploited for wood harvesting and cattle pasture, and are visited almost only by hikers and hunters. Therefore, S. atra pasubiensis is not threatened directly by human activities, but the narrow extent and the isolation of the suitable habitat increases vulnerability in the face of the general climatic trend.

According to regional assessments following IUCN criteria, S. atra pasubiensis has been considered as Endangered (EN), under criterion D1, because it seems to be present in a single site, the population size could be less than 250 individuals and it is threatened by the general climatic trend.

The single known population of S. atra pasubiensis is in the Veneto Region, specifically in the Province of Vicenza. It is entirely in the Natura 2000 site IT3210040 “Monti Lessini - Pasubio - Piccole Dolomiti Vicentine”.

Salamandra atra pasubiensis is not considered in the EU Habitats Directive 92/43/EEC because it was unknown at the time.

== Taxonomy ==
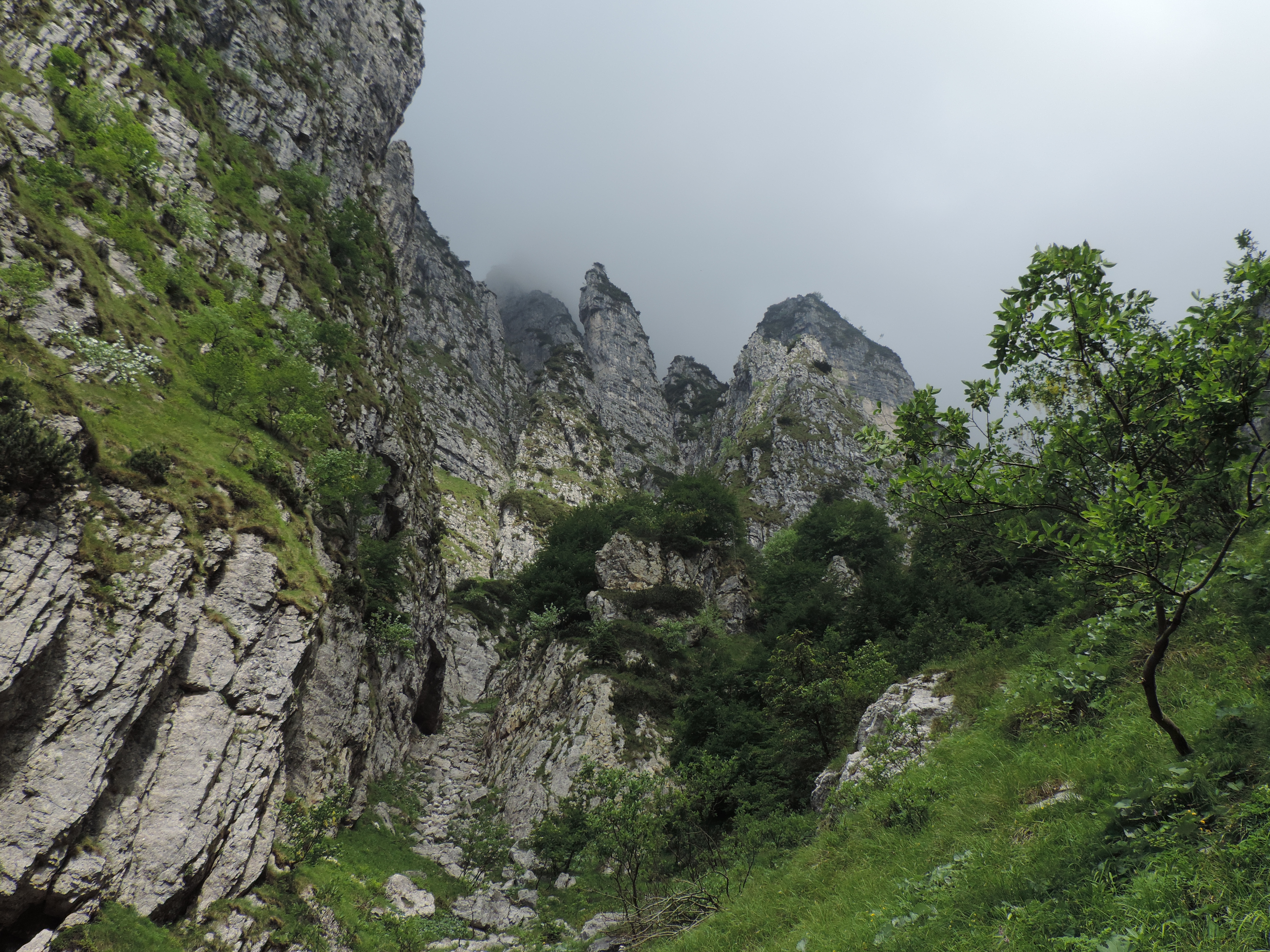
Habitat of S. a. pasubiensis, Monte Pasubio

After a few uncertain or undocumented reports, the presence of a differentiated population of S. atra on the Pasubio massif was eventually confirmed in 1999. This population has been named as a distinct subspecies in 2005, because it is chromatically and genetically differentiated from both S. atra atra and S. atra aurorae, and geographically separated from the remaining species range. The type locality is “Val Fontana d'Oro” and the holotype has been deposited in the Zoological Museum La Specola in Florence.
