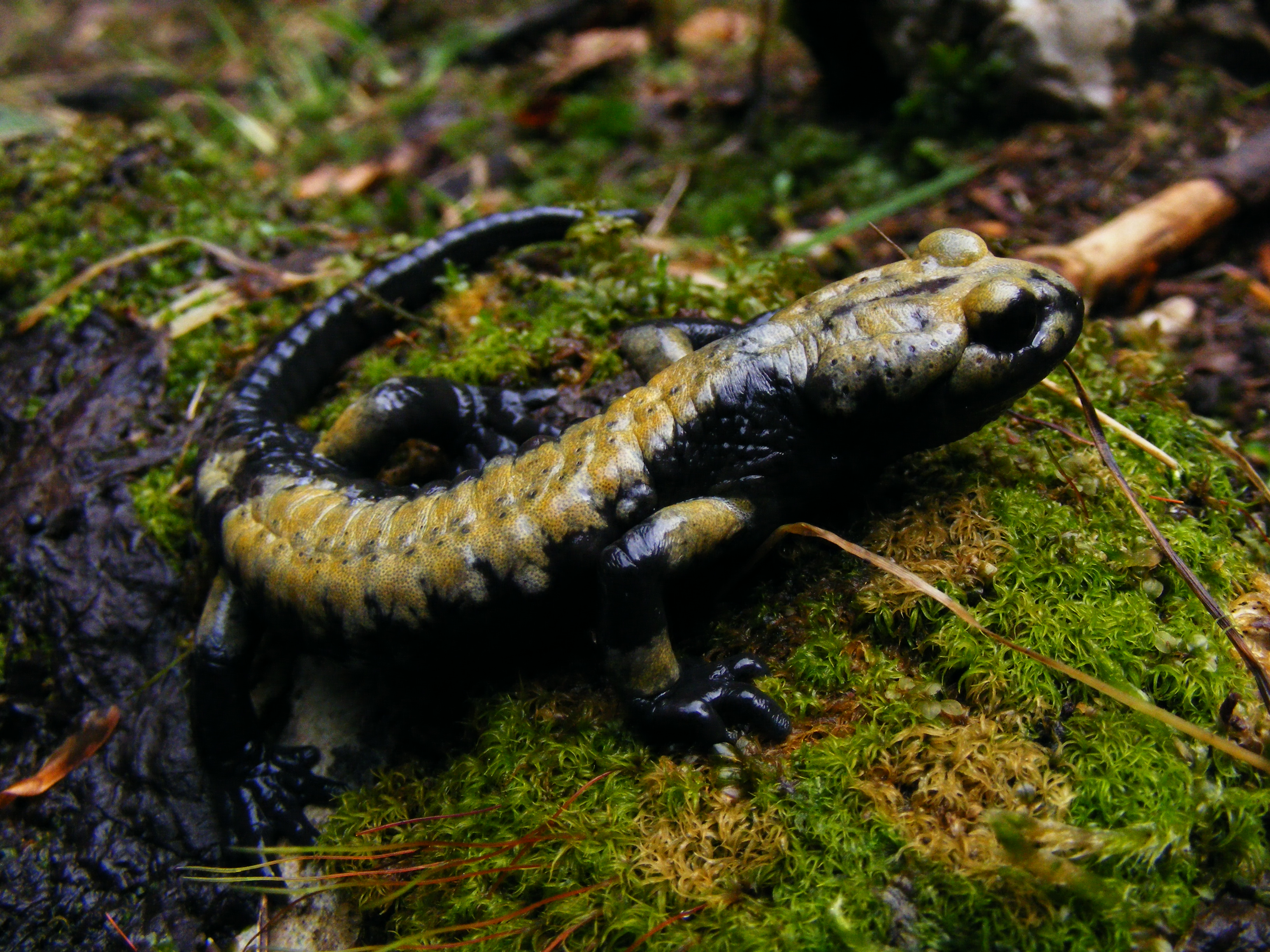
- Altopiano dei Sette Comuni, June 2014

Scientific classification
- Kingdom: Animalia
- Phylum: Chordata
- Class: Amphibia
- Order: Urodela
- Family: Salamandridae
- Genus: Salamandra
- Species: S. atra
- Subspecies: S. a. aurorae

Trinomial name
- Salamandra atra aurorae Trevisan, 1982

= Salamandra atra aurorae =

Subspecies of amphibian

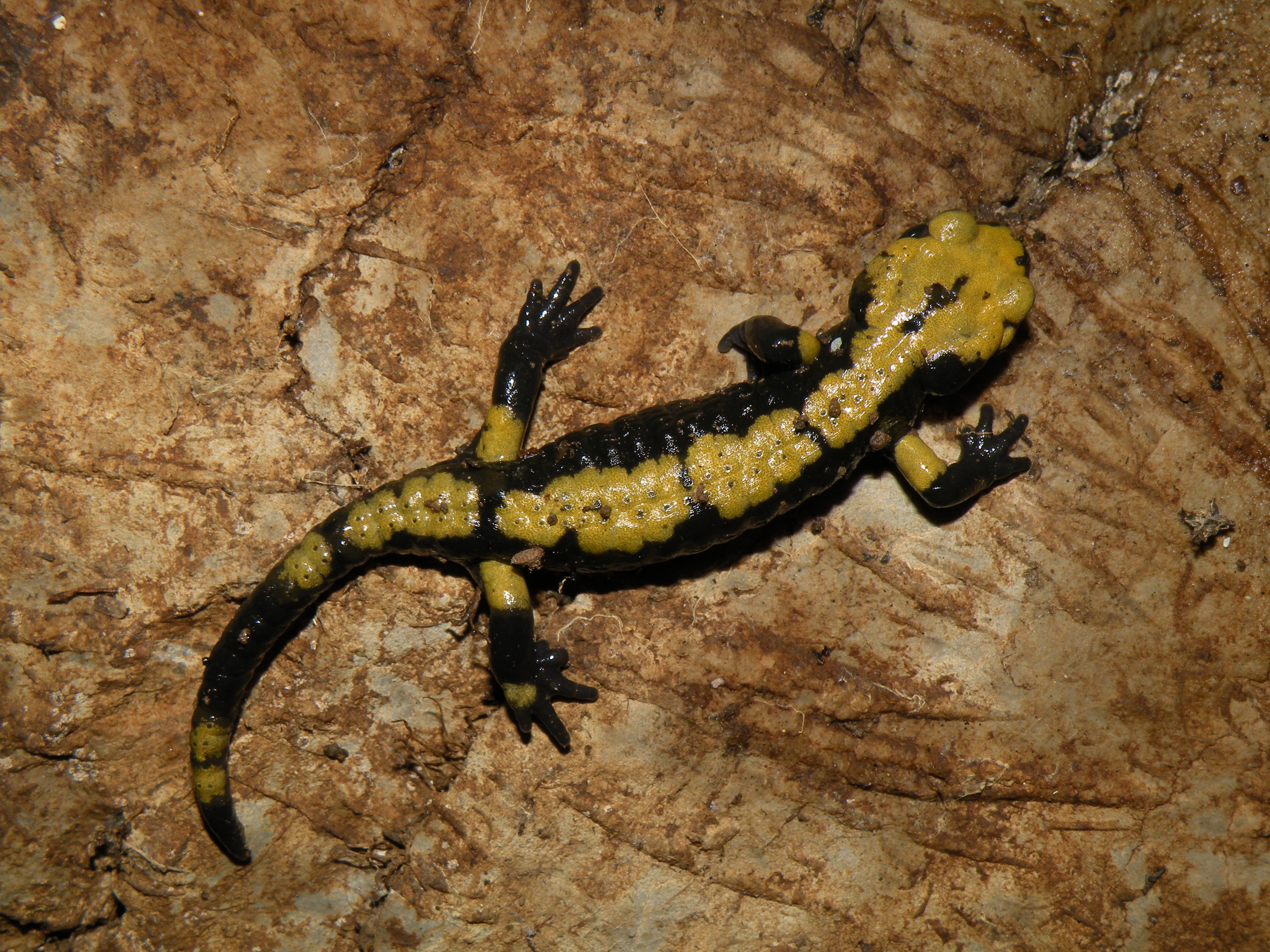
Salamandra atra aurorae, Altopiano dei Sette Comuni, July 2012

Salamandra atra aurorae is a subspecies of the alpine salamander Salamandra atra found in south-eastern Italian Prealps. It is often called the golden alpine salamander.

== Morphology ==
Salamandra atra aurorae is very similar in body shape to all other subspecies of S. atra, also in all major characters that often distinguish different species of Salamandra: outline of the head, position of the vomerine teeth, proportions of body parts and limbs, arrangement of glandular bulges and pores on the skin, and shape and length of the tail.

However, the body surface is not entirely and uniformly black as in most other populations of S. atra. Conversely, the dorsal side of S. atra aurorae is broadly covered with yellow blotches and brown spots, which are broader and often coalescent on the head and the trunk, they are usually present also on the arms, the thighs and the tail, whereas they are rare on the flanks and the ventral sides. Blotches are invariantly present in all individuals, but highly variable in extent (covering from slightly more than half of the dorsal surface to almost the entire dorsal surface) and in dominant hue (from pale yellow to marbled brown). The colour pattern is highly variable between individuals, without any obvious difference neither between sexes nor between sites. It is established at birth and it usually changes only slightly with growth. However, relatively rapid and extended changes from yellow to brown have been occasionally observed in captive individuals.

Newly born individuals are about 50 mm long and less than 1 g, whereas adults may reach 134 mm in males and 139 mm in females, and 14 g in pregnant females.

The sexual dimorphism is very slight, but it has not been investigated adequately. Like in other subspecies of S. atra, the cloacal region is usually swollen in the adult males.

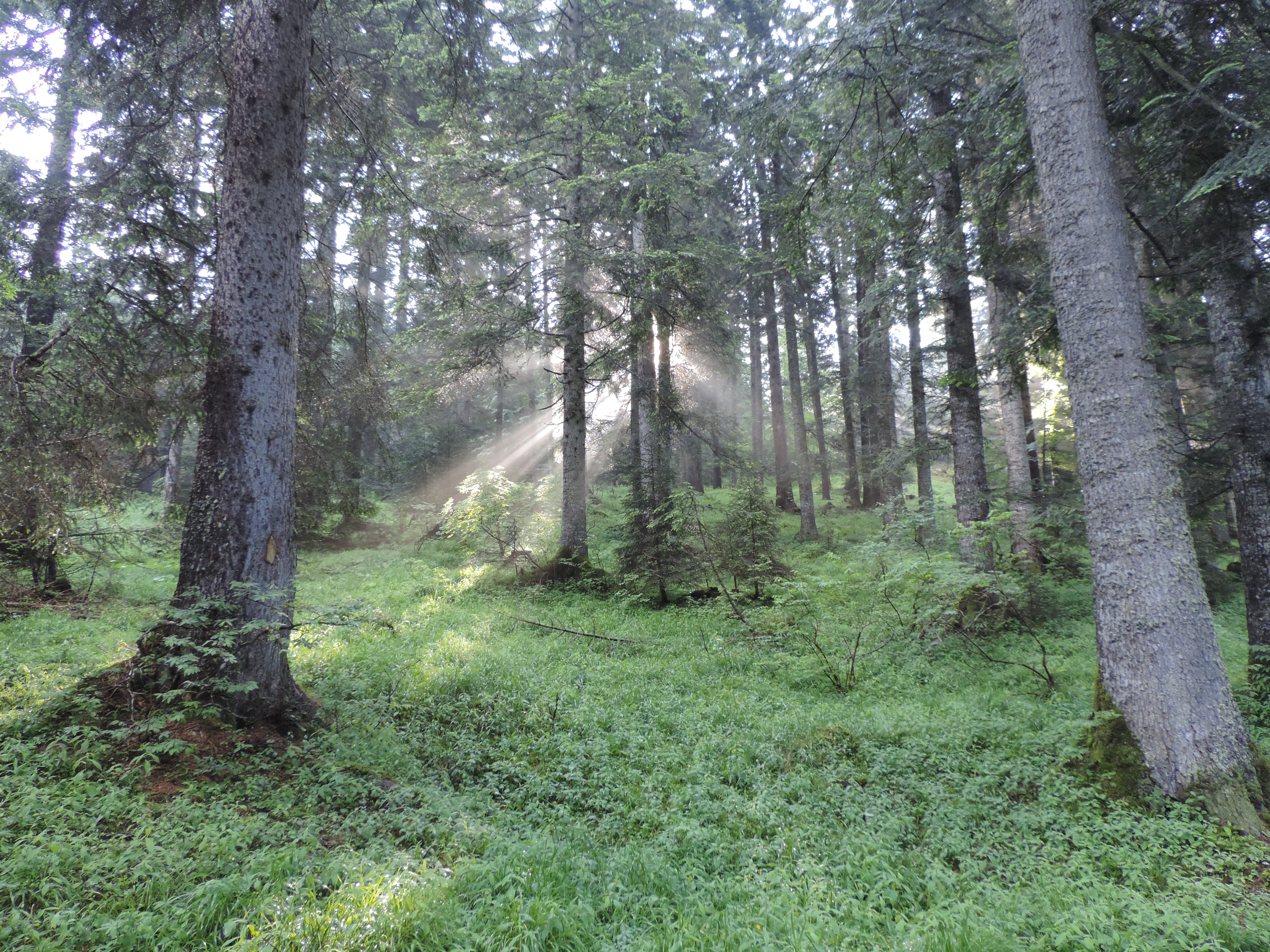
habitat of Salamandra atra aurorae, Altopiano dei Sette Comuni - photo by E. Romanazzi

== Distribution ==
Salamandra atra aurorae lives only in the northern part of the Sette Comuni plateau, in the Venetian Prealps, NE Italy. The actual distribution is known only incompletely, because the animals are very elusive and therefore hard to detect, and adequate investigations have not been carried out. As to 2016, all documented or reliable records cluster in 12 areas, more than 0.7 km far from each other and approximately aligned West to East from Val Postesina to Monte Fossetta. However, it is unknown whether the populations detected in these areas are actually separated or instead connected through suitable intermediate areas. The estimated "area of occupancy" of S. atra aurorae is 26 km^{2}.

== Habitat ==
Areas inhabited by S. atra aurorae are in the range 1200–1800 m and include both moderately inclined slopes and narrow valleys facing south. The substrate is rocky, calcareous and karstic. Most sites are covered with forest stands with Beech, Silver Fir and Norway Spruce, with variable abundance of leaf litter, dead wood on the ground, and patches of grass and moss. Only a few records are from shrubby meadows.

In the area of the Bosco del Dosso, S. atra aurorae inhabits only the inner parts of the forest, where old-growth stands of Silver Fir with Beech are apparently more suitable than thicker stands dominated by Norway Spruce. Among adults, habitat requirements are similar between males and females.

== Life cycle ==
The life cycle of S. atra aurorae has been investigated only in part, but is probably similar to that documented for S. atra atra.

The embryonic and larval development are completed in the uteri of the mother and take at least two years. The juvenile is born after completing metamorphosis, even though it may retain small residuals of gills for a period. Usually two juveniles are born together by a pregnant female.

== Behaviour ==
Individuals overwinter underground, most probably at some depth in the soil, where they remain inactive for at least 6 months. Since late April to mid October, instead, they still spend most part of the time resting in the soil, however often in the most upper level, sometimes concealed under occasional shelters (e.g., stones emerging from the ground, dead wood or pieces of barks on the surface). During this period, they exit and move on the surface only when the surface is wet and the air is very humid, especially after intense rains following dry periods, independently from the daily cycle of light. At difference from other S. atra, S. atra aurorae does not exit regularly every day around dawn. Adult males are apparently more prone to epigean activity than females and juveniles.

While juveniles disperse during the yearly season, adults are sedentary and remain within their home range also between years. Different shelters are used by a single individual within its home range, which is a few tens of square metres on average, without any obvious differences between males and females. Individual home ranges are partially overlapping, also between individuals of the same sex. The population density has been estimated up to hundreds of individuals per hectare.

== Threats, conservation status, management ==
All forests inhabited by S. atra aurorae have been exploited for wood for centuries. However, modern practices commonly employed in wood harvesting include the use of heavy machines moving on the ground during the season of activity of the animals. In addition to causing direct mortality, they compact the soil and remove the ground vegetation along broad stripes. As a consequence, the microhabitat conditions become locally unsuitable for S. atra aurorae.

This is a critical point when considering the management of wood harvesting following the Storm Vaia, which hit north-eastern Italy in autumn 2018 and damaged the woods where this salamander lives.

Concerns have also been raised, especially in the past, for the negative impacts of the illegal and uncontrolled collection of specimens, primarily for pet trade, and for the alteration of the local microclimate as a consequence of the capture of water springs for human use.

According to regional assessments following IUCN criteria, S. atra aurorae has been categorized as Vulnerable (VU) under criterion D2, because the “extent of occurrence” was estimated <20 km^{2}. Instead, within the global assessment of the species S. atra, evaluators proposed to rank the subspecies S. atra aurorae as Critically endangered (CR), under criterion B1ab (iii), because it was considered comprising a single local population and the habitat quality was judged as declining.

The range of distribution of S. atra aurorae is mainly in the Veneto Region, specifically in the Province of Vicenza, and a part in the Province of Trento.

Salamandra atra aurorae is listed in the Annex II (originally under the name 'Salamandra salamandra aurorae') and Annex IV (under the name 'Salamandra aurorae') of the EU Habitats Directive 92/43/EEC. As a consequence, killing, handling and disturbing these animals or altering their habitat are not allowed. Scientific surveys may be carried on only after obtaining a specific permit by the Italian "Ministero dell'ambiente e della tutela del territorio e del mare". Most of the known range is included in the Natura 2000 site IT3220036 “Altopiano dei Sette Comuni”.

Public awareness of the uniqueness of S. atra aurorae has recently grown in the human communities of the Altopiano dei Sette Comuni. The animal is depicted in the logo of the local natural history museum “Museo Naturalistico Didattico Patrizio Rigoni" and in the logo of the local ice hockey team “Asiago Newts Hockey”.

== Taxonomy ==
Salamandra atra aurorae had remained unknown to scientists up to 1978, when a specimen kept in a cage in a local temporary exhibition was noticed by a couple of biologists. The discovery was published for the first time in 1981. The taxonomic description and denomination appeared in the following year, first within an abstract for a congress and then in a detailed article. The subspecific name refers to Aurora, wife of the author of the description. For nomenclatural purposes, the type locality was designated as the “Bosco del Dosso, near Vaio di Pian del Morto, between val Remaloch and Val Rotta” and the holotype has been deposited in the Zoological Museum La Specola in Florence. Since the original description, S. atra aurorae has been almost universally distinguished at the subspecies rank, but it has been sometimes raised to the species rank.

The taxonomic distinction of S. atra aurorae is corroborated by both phenotypic and genetic differences from all other populations of the S. atra: all specimens of S. atra aurorae have yellow blotches covering more than half of the dorsal surface, whereas the specimens of all other subspecies are either uniformly black or at most only sparsely spotted; additionally, genetic data suggests that S. atra aurorae represents a distinct lineage within S. atra. Mating between S. atra aurorae and S. atra atra has been observed under captive conditions, producing viable and fertile juveniles with narrower yellow patches.
