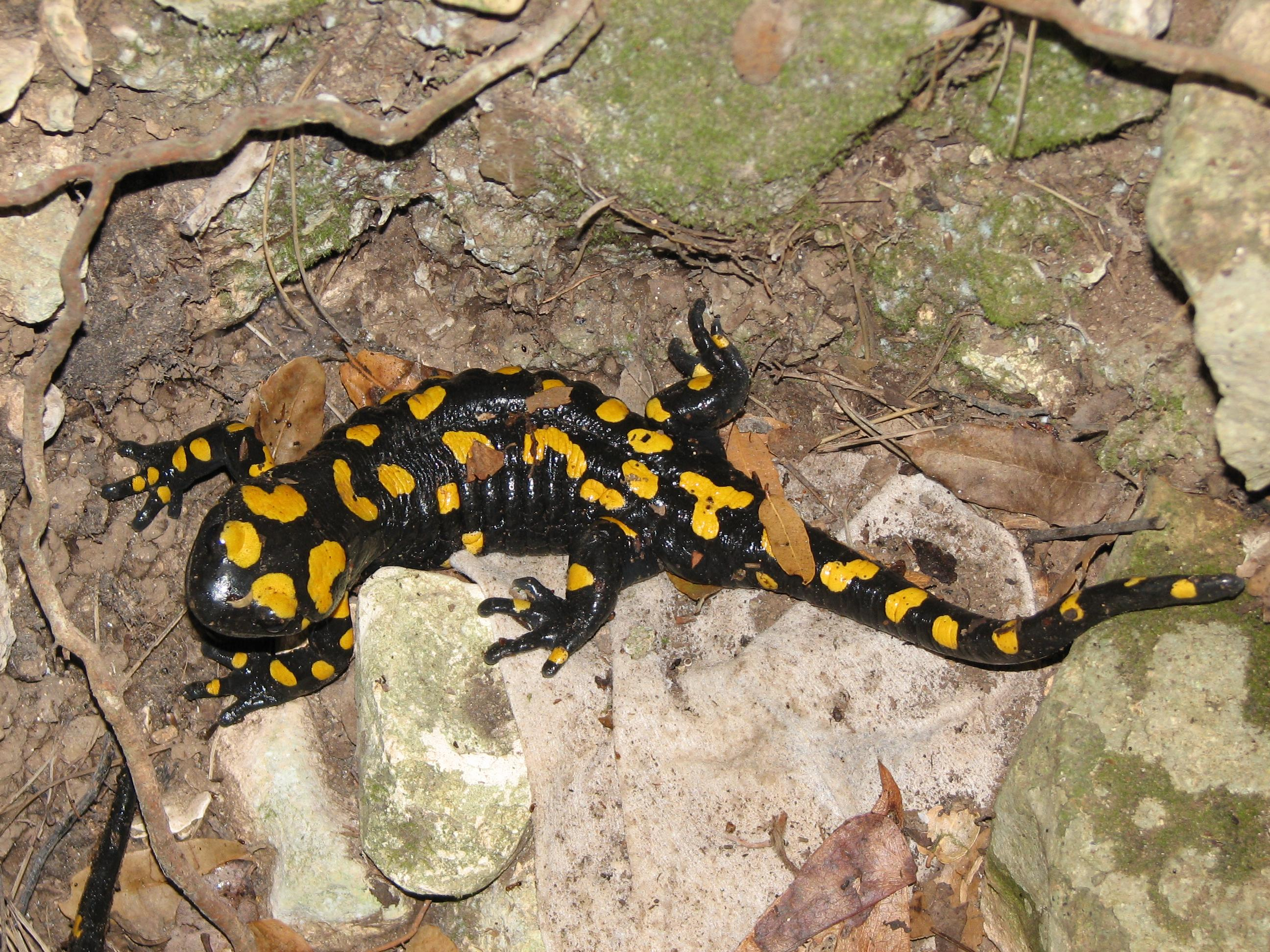

Conservation status
- Least Concern (IUCN 3.1)

Scientific classification
- Kingdom: Animalia
- Phylum: Chordata
- Class: Amphibia
- Order: Urodela
- Family: Salamandridae
- Genus: Salamandra
- Species: S. infraimmaculata

Binomial name
- Salamandra infraimmaculata Martens, 1885

Synonyms
- List: Salamandra maculosa var. infraimmaculata Martens, 1885; Salamandra semenovi Nesterov, 1916; Salamandra maculosa var. orientalis Wolterstorff, 1925; Salamandra maculosa subsp. semenovi Wolterstorff, 1925; Salamandra maculosa forma orientalis Wolterstorff, 1932; Salamandra salamandra semenovi Wolterstorff, 1932; Salamandra salamandra orientalis Bodenheimer, 1944; Salamandra salamandra infraimmaculata Mertens, 1948; Salamandra infraimmaculata Gasser, 1978; Salamandra infraimmaculata immaculata Joger and Steinfartz, 1995; Salamandra infraimmaculata orientalis Joger and Steinfartz, 1995; Salamandra infraimmaculata semenovi Joger and Steinfartz, 1995; Salamandra (Oriandra) infraimmaculata infraimmaculata Dubois and Raffaëlli, 2009; Salamandra (Oriandra) infraimmaculata orientalis Dubois and Raffaëlli, 2009; Salamandra (Oriandra) infraimmaculata semenovi Dubois and Raffaëlli, 2009; Salamandra (Oriandra) semenovi Raffaëlli, 2013

= Near Eastern fire salamander =

Species of amphibian

The Near Eastern fire salamander (Salamandra infraimmaculata) also called arouss al-ayn in Arabic, is a species of salamander in the family Salamandridae found in Iran, Iraq, Turkey, and the Levant: Syria, Lebanon, and Israel, along with possible records in Gaza. Its natural habitats are subtropical dry shrubland and forests, often near rivers and freshwater springs. It is threatened by habitat loss.

== Description ==
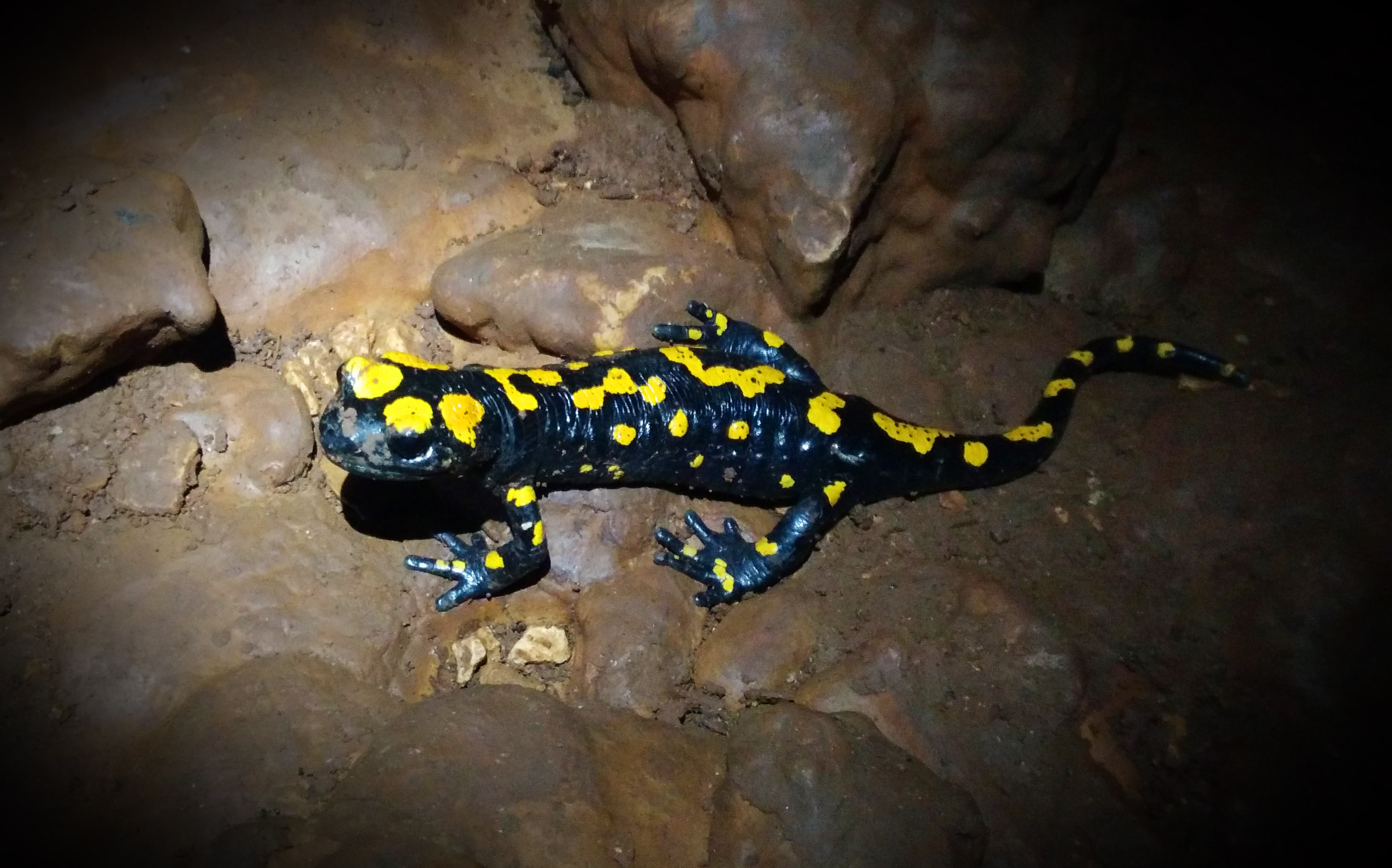
in a cave near Fassuta, Israel

This species is a black salamander with yellow spots on its back as warning coloration, but none on its belly. It has smooth, shiny skin, usually with four large, yellow blotches on the head. Various subspecies have different patterns of colours, for example, S. i. orientalis is virtually identical to S. i. infraimmaculata, but has a large number of yellow dots all over its body. However, the validity of this subspecies is in question. Another subspecies, S. i. semenovi, has a more rounded head and rose-shaped spots over the top part of the body. It can grow to 324 mm (12.8 in) in length. S. i. infraimmaculata is the largest subspecies. Females are in general larger than males.

== Distribution and habitat ==
The species is native to northwestern Iran, northern Iraq, Syria, Lebanon, Palestine, northern Israel near the ancient city of Tel Dan and northern and western Galilee, and the Mount Carmel area. In Turkey, the species can be found in Anatolia. It is found at altitudes of between 180 and 2,000 metres (590 and 6,560 ft).

Depending on the terrain, it can be found in various kinds of forests. For example, in Iran, it inhabits open cork forests with scattered trees, while in Turkey and Lebanon, it can be found in damp woods and groves in mountainous and hilly regions, especially near water. It can also be found near springs and the temporary pools that form after winter rains. It protects itself during the day by hiding under leaves, roots, or rocks and emerges at night to forage. In Palestine, it can be found around pools and spring-fed, slow-moving streams.

== Ecology ==
The adults are active at night and spend the day in hiding. During the hottest months of summer they may aestivate, depending on location, and individuals at higher elevations hibernate during the winter. They show great fidelity to their hiding and breeding places. It used to be thought that they were resident within small home ranges but it has now been shown that this is not the case; migration sometimes take place and individuals may wander far from their normal territory.

Adults live on land and feed on insects, earthworms, slugs, snails, other small invertebrates, and even young salamanders of other species.

=== Life cycle ===
Breeding takes place during the cooler months of winter. Although courtship has not been much studied, it is believed to be similar to that of the fire salamander. The male holds the female in a ventral amplexus. He deposits a spermatophore on the ground underneath her and moves his tail and sacrum in such a way that her abdomen comes into contact with it. She grasps it with the lips of her cloaca and draws it inside. A female may receive spermatophores from several different males.

This salamander is ovoviviparous, with the developing embryos being retained in the female's oviduct. There may be about a year between the fertilisation of the eggs and the deposition of live tadpoles into pools (female sperm storage). They are not all deposited at one time, and the female visits several ponds, choosing ones without large salamander larvae already present and those with plenty of crevices in which the young tadpoles hide.

Salamanders of this species can live up to 23 years for males and 21 years for females.

==== Larvae ====
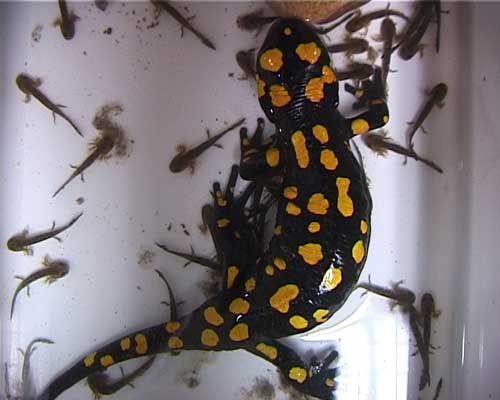
Female with larvae

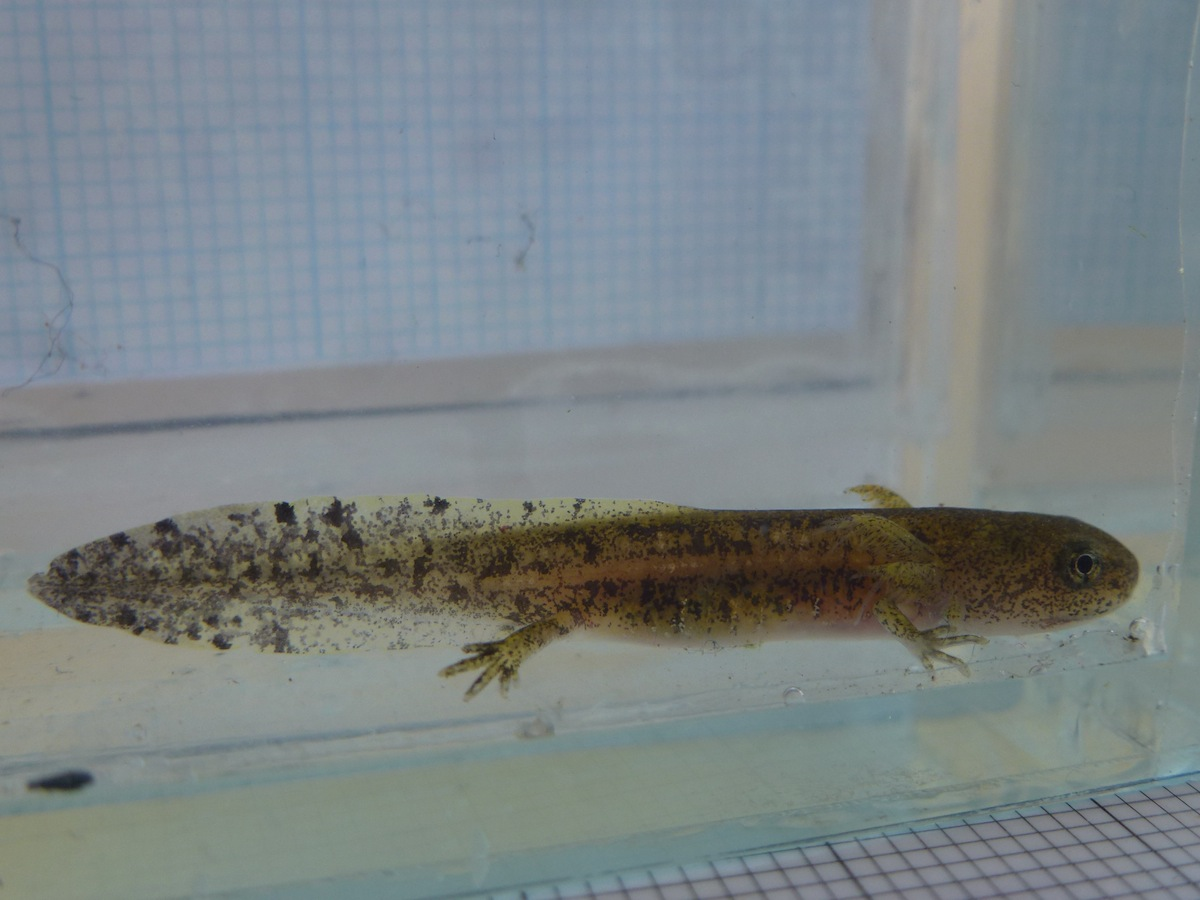
Larva, Israel

When born, the larvae weigh about 20 g (0.7 oz) and already have two pairs of legs and two sets of external gills. They use their finned tails for swimming. The larvae grow rapidly, and if food is scarce, may become cannibalistic. This cannibal morph occurs when larvae detect the water volume from their pond dropping, which triggers a transformation into the big-headed cannibal morph. They are more likely to eat unrelated tadpoles than their clutch mates. This behavior may be an adaptive feature related to the decreasing quantity of water in their temporary pools and may be sparked by the presence of dead tadpoles or a change in the quality of the water. Under these circumstances, cannibalism may be an important behaviour that allows some of the tadpoles to survive. Tadpoles grow in size to about 5–7 cm (2.0–2.8 in) before undergoing metamorphosis which takes place after two to four months.

Typically, the larvae feed mainly on small crustaceans, mosquito larvae, and tadpoles of frogs and toads. If fish inhabit the pond, they prey heavily on newt tadpoles, but if not, the salamander tadpoles are at the top of the food chain and have a significant impact on the composition and diversity of species in the pool.

== Status ==
This species is listed as "Near Threatened" in the IUCN Red List of Threatened Species. In some areas, it is quite plentiful, but in others is uncommon or rare. It is considered to be threatened in Israel and Lebanon due to road building and the pollution of water bodies by pesticides. The introduction of predatory fish such as the mosquitofish (Gambusia affinis) can severely impact the number of tadpoles that survive to adulthood. In Turkey, the population trend is downwards and the threats include the drying up of water bodies due to the extraction of ground water, the damming of streams, traffic, and the fragmentation of suitable habitat by development. In Israel, it is listed as "Endangered" and is protected by national legislation. In Lebanon, its status is unknown, while in Syria, it is considered to be vulnerable because of habitat destruction. In both Turkey and Israel, it is present in some national parks.

== Captivity ==
This salamander can be kept as a pet, and captive breeding has been successful on some occasions. A 26.5 centimetres (10.4 inches) female imported from Lebanon in 1966 at a larval stage successfully reproduced 79 larvae in 2007. Four years later, in another gestation period, 102 further larvae were produced. In Israel, where the species is protected, capture or possession of wild individual requires authorization from the Israel Nature and Parks Authority.
