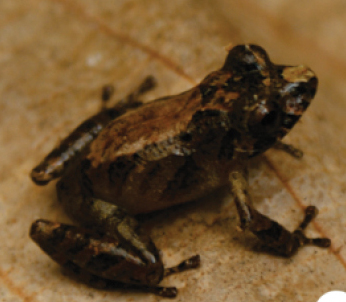

Conservation status
- Least Concern (IUCN 3.1)

Scientific classification
- Kingdom: Animalia
- Phylum: Chordata
- Class: Amphibia
- Order: Anura
- Family: Strabomantidae
- Genus: Pristimantis
- Species: P. ockendeni

Binomial name
- Pristimantis ockendeni (Boulenger, 1912)

Synonyms
- Eleutherodactylus ockendeni (Boulenger, 1912); Eleutherodactylus anderssoni Lynch, 1968; Eleutherodactylus melini Bokermann, 1968

= Pristimantis ockendeni =

Species of frog

Pristimantis ockendeni is a species of frog in the family Strabomantidae. It is found in Brazil, Colombia, Ecuador, Peru, and possibly Bolivia. Its natural habitats are tropical moist lowland forests, tropical moist montane forests, and heavily degraded former forest.

Research published in early 2008 suggested that in Ecuador the species is actually at least three different cryptic species that diverged at least 5 million years ago.
