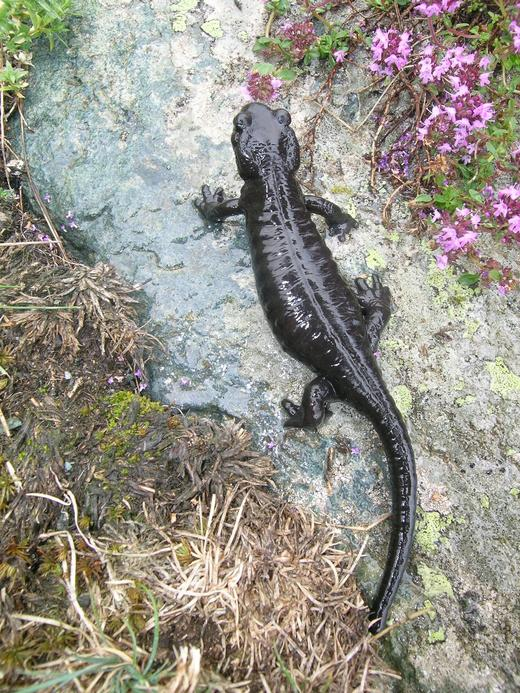

Conservation status
- Critically Endangered (IUCN 3.1)

Scientific classification
- Kingdom: Animalia
- Phylum: Chordata
- Class: Amphibia
- Order: Urodela
- Family: Salamandridae
- Genus: Salamandra
- Species: S. lanzai

Binomial name
- Salamandra lanzai Nascetti, Andreone, Capula & Bullini, 1988

= Lanza's alpine salamander =

Species of amphibian

Lanza's alpine salamander or the large alpine salamander (Salamandra lanzai) is a species of salamander in the family Salamandridae, found in France and Italy. Its natural habitats are forests, grasslands, and pasturelands, all of which are temperate. It is threatened by habitat loss and potentially in the future by the fungal disease Batrachochytrium salamandrivorans.

== History ==
It was described by Nascetti, Andreone, Capula and Bullini in 1988. The generic name is from Greek which translates as "salamander", and the specific name is for Benedetto Lanza, an Italian herpetologist.

== Description ==
The species has a flat head and measures between 115 and 160 millimetres (4.5 and 6.3 in) in length. Its tail's tip is either rounded or pointed, with or without paravertebral glands. Due to its black colour, it is similar to the other alpine salamander (Salamandra atra).

== Distribution ==
The species can be found in the Cottian Alps near Monviso, and in Guil Valley of southeastern France. It can also be found in northwestern Italy, the Germanasca, Pellice Valleys, and the Po River. It is doubtful in Chisone Valley. An old sample of the species in Museo La Specola in Florence suggests it is also found in the Maritime Alps.

== Ecology ==
They feed on various insects, spiders, and various species of slugs.

== Habitat ==
They are found at elevations of 1,200–2,600 m (3,900–8,500 ft), with the maximum altitude of 2,800 m (9,200 ft). In France, the species can be found at 1,800–2,300 metres (5,900–7,500 ft), while in Italy it is found at 1,450–2,100 metres (4,760–6,890 ft) in altitude. A subalpine prairie is considered to be home for them. It also lives in fresh humid woods and forests and on the edges of mountainous streams.

== Mating and reproduction ==
They start mating on land, from May to October. During that time, they become nocturnal, but during heavy rains, they may become diurnal. Mating happens on land mostly in May, but it depends on the climate of any given year. They give birth from two to six young, which are born completely formed, after their mating act is successfully fulfilled, which is as long as three to four years.

== Toxicology ==
They are toxic species. When under threat, they release a liquid toxin through the small openings on their bodies. The liquid is strong and may cause irritation if in contact with the eyes. They warn predators by raising their bodies and dipping their heads downwards when threatened.

== Predators ==
Various birds and vipers prey on Lanza's alpine salamander.

== Conservation ==
This species is common within its very limited range, but due to its small distribution, it was previously classified as vulnerable on the IUCN Red List. However, in 2022 it was precautionarily listed as critically endangered by the IUCN due to potential threats from the fungal disease Batrachochytrium salamandrivorans, which has been recorded in nearby regions of Germany. If the fungus is allowed to spread naturally, it may be at risk of extinction within the next 40 years, and possibly sooner if humans introduce the disease nearby.
