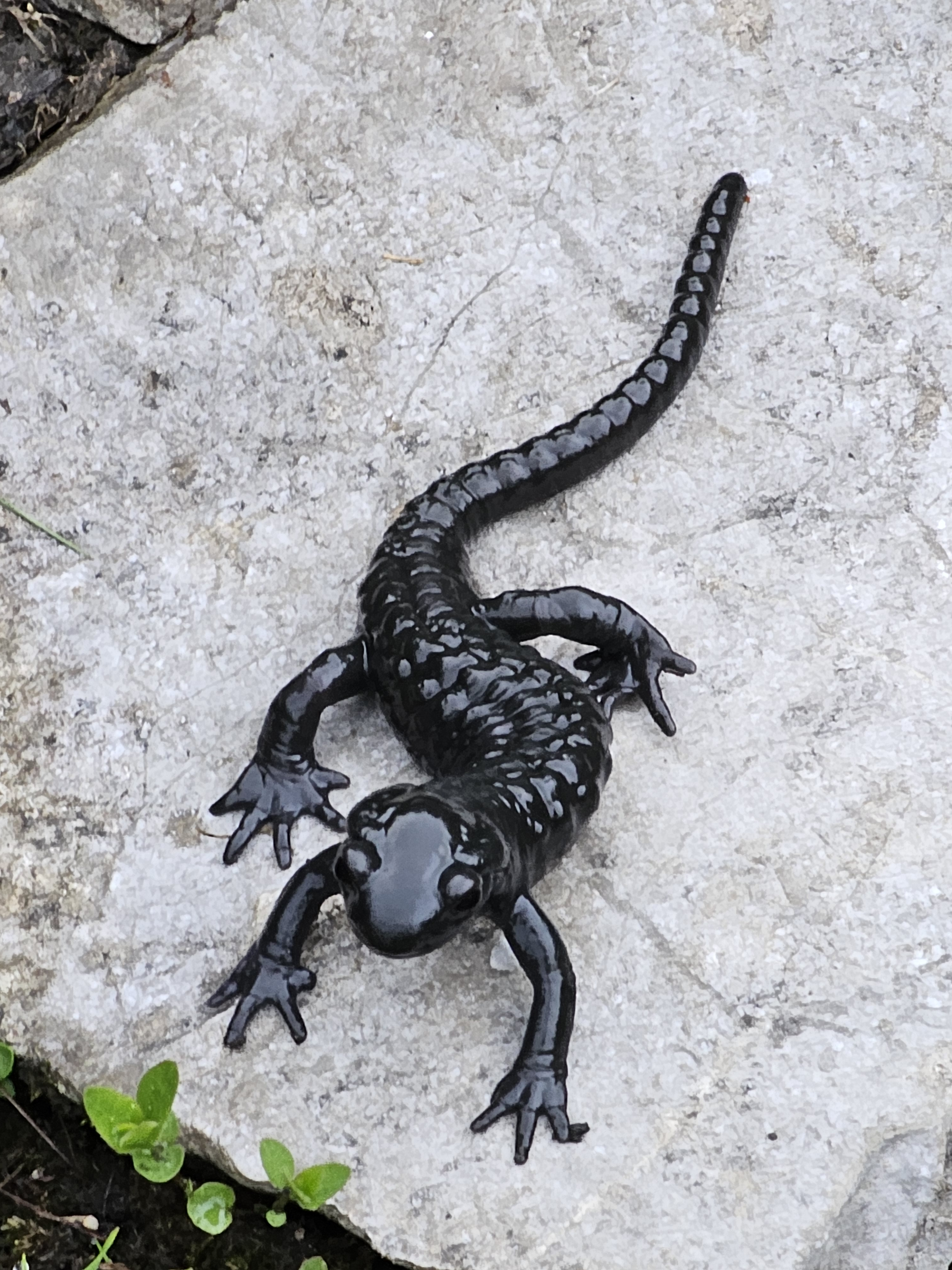

Conservation status
- Least Concern (IUCN 3.1)

Scientific classification
- Kingdom: Animalia
- Phylum: Chordata
- Class: Amphibia
- Order: Urodela
- Family: Salamandridae
- Genus: Salamandra
- Species: S. atra

Binomial name
- Salamandra atra Laurenti, 1768
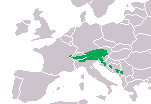

= Alpine salamander =

Species of amphibian

The alpine salamander (Salamandra atra) is a black salamander that can be found in the Alps, and through the mountainous range in Europe. It is a member of the genus Salamandra. The species name, atra, is derived from the Latin ater, meaning dull black. The colour of salamanders has evolved over time, as some species are completely monochrome black, and others have yellow spotting and marks. Their life expectancy is at least 10 years. There are four subspecies of the alpine salamander, with varied distribution and physical colour. Unlike other salamanders, whose larvae develop in water, the alpine salamander and its subspecies are fully terrestrial species in life and gestation. They give birth to live young.

Alpine salamanders produce toxic compounds from their skin. These compounds may protect them from both predator and microbial threats.

== Description ==
Alpine salamanders are often small in size, and dark brown or black. Members of the subspecies are not wholly black or brown monochrome, but rather have mosaic or spotted patterns. Members of the subspecies Salamandra atra aurorae have bright splotches on its dorsal side and head. The colour is often bright yellow, but can range to shades of white or even grey. Distribution of the pigment is dependent on the distribution of certain cells, so may be smooth and even or patchy.

Female S. atra tend to be larger than the males, and can grow up to 151 millimetres (5.9 in). Males will grow to around 144 millimetres (5.7 in); both measurements include the tail. Males have swollen, visible cloacae, and are slenderer than females. The salamanders have parotid glands posterior and lateral to their eyes, giving them an elongated head shape. They tend to have between 11 and 13 costal grooves along the sides of their bodies, and a double row of dorsal glands runs down their backs on either side of their spines, down to the tips of their tails.

=== Colour ===
Most alpine salamanders that are either completely black (melanistic) or predominantly black have the dark pigment as a baseline, but the evolution behind this dark colouring has a winding history. Scientists have studied the hypothesis of if the salamanders start completely black, or if they evolved like that over time. DNA-evidence traced through maternal lineages suggest the latter, that salamanders evolved their black colour over time.

Biological pigmentation is determined by presentation of specific pigment-producing cells, called chromatophores, which absorb and/or reflect light in a particular way to then appear as a colour. In S. atra, there are different cells present or activated, which yield different colours; melanophores contribute to the dark colour by producing the dark pigment melanin, while xanthophores produce a yellow pigment, and iridophores are simply light-reflecting. The fully black phenotype seen in S. a. atra results from the salamanders' melanophores in the dermis and epidermis, producing melanin alone. Xanthophore-iridophore complexes are responsible for production of yellow spotting, which appears bright. In species without yellow patches, it appears that they do not ever develop these cells. In S. a. aurorae or other salamanders with different colour on different parts of their body, two distinct skin types are present; one that only contains melanophores (black), and one that has melanophores, xanthophores, and iridophores in combination.

The yellow colouring on some alpine salamanders is thought to be an aposematic strategy to fend off predation. The pure black colouring is also suggested to be a form of thermoregulation, though it may also be considered a warning to some predators.

== Taxonomy and subspecies ==
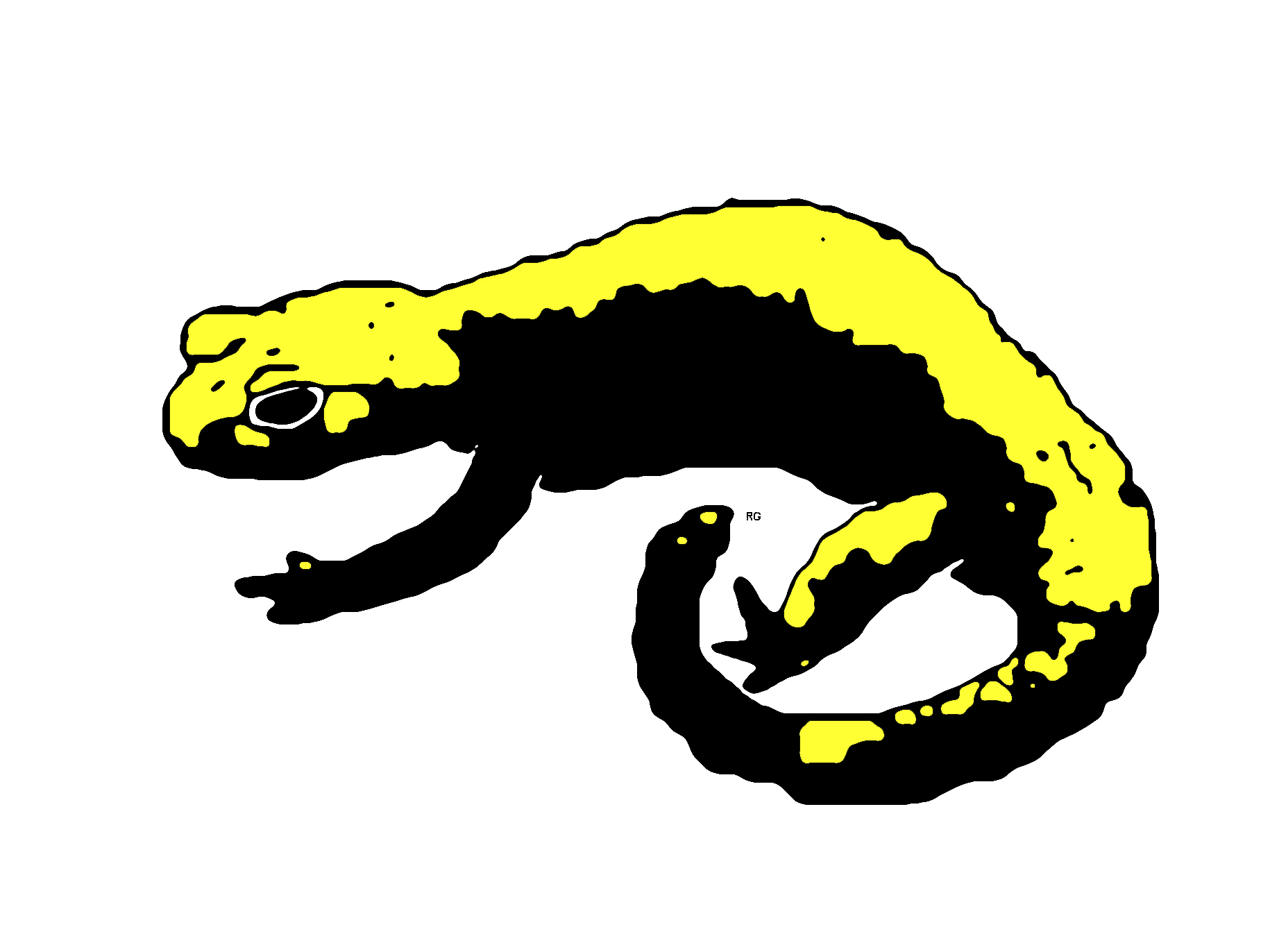
S. a. aurorae (golden alpine salamander)

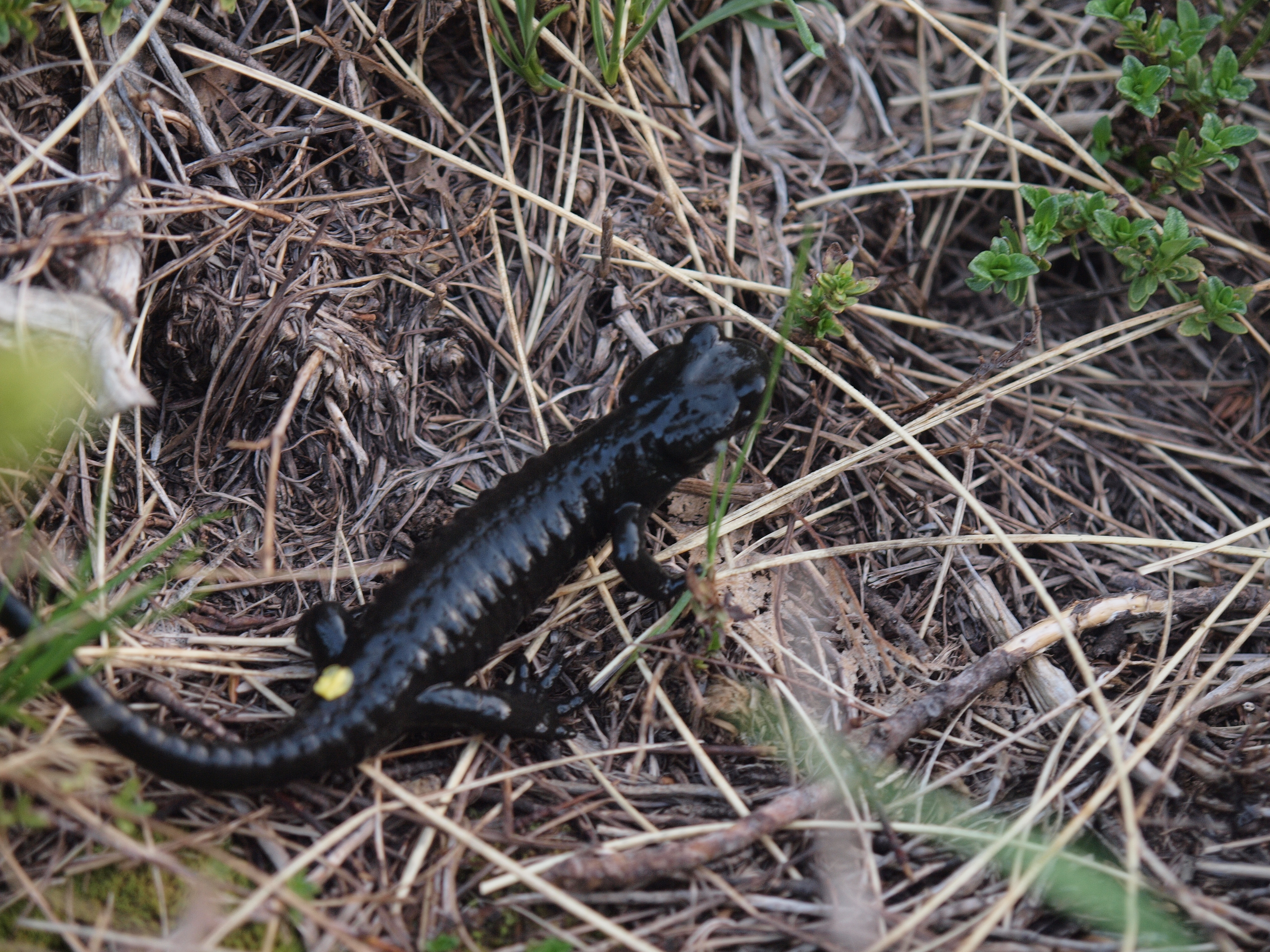
S. a. prenjensis in Montenegro

- S. a. atra is a fully melanistic (black) subspecies from the Central, Eastern and Dinaric Alps. This subspecies is the most widespread.
- S. a. aurorae, the golden alpine salamander, has golden or yellow spots on its back and primarily lives in a small area in the Venetian Prealps near Asiago, and in the Italian Alps.
- S. a. pasubiensis, with fewer yellow spots than S. a. aurorae, lives in a different part of the Venetian Prealps.
- S. a. prenjensis lives on Prenj Mountain, part of the Dinaric Alps in Bosnia and Herzegovina. The validity of this subspecies is yet to be confirmed, and some scientists in the field debate if this salamander should be considered its own independent species.

Genetic analysis suggests that the Corsican fire salamander (Salamandra corsica) is the closest related species, and that the black-yellow colour is an ancestral feature of alpine salamanders. Proposed colonisation from south (Prealps) to Alps was by the fully melanistic (derived feature) S. a. atra after the last retreat of the ice sheets.

== Habitat and distribution ==
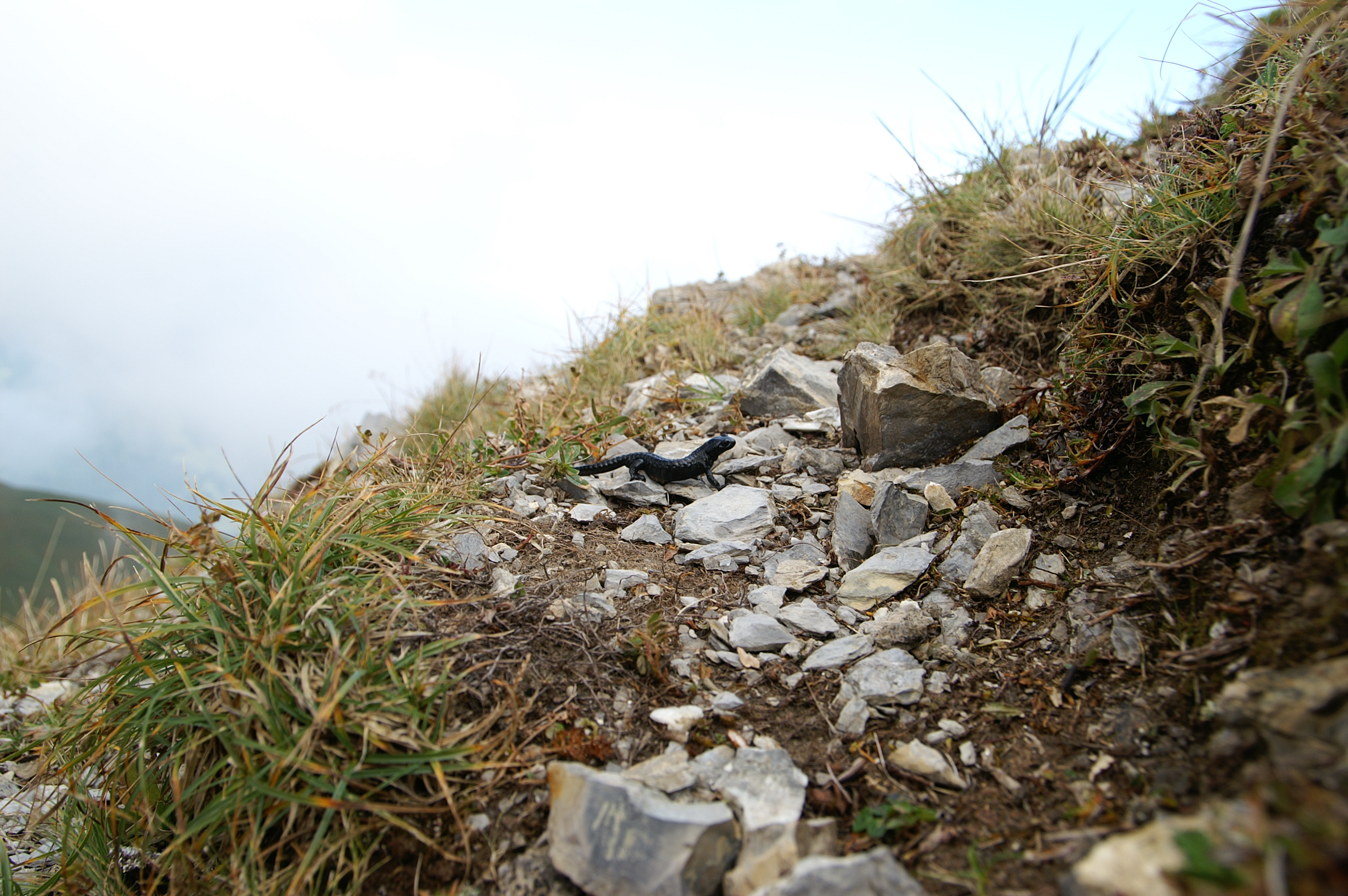
Alpine salamander (centre) photographed in Schoppernau, an Austrian municipality.

=== Habitat ===
As terrestrial organisms, these salamanders live on land. S. atra tend to live underneath stones or logs, or in rocky crevices in their mountainous habitat. They also are diurnal, and most active in the day with periods of inactivity, rest, or sleep at night. They will engage in nocturnal activity on a weather-dependent basis. Ideal weather for alpine salamanders is rainy or post-rain, at temperatures between 3 and 18 °C (37.4 and 64.4 °F).

=== Geographic distribution ===
The alpine salamander is found from the France–Switzerland border at the western end of its range, all the way through Switzerland and Austria to the Dinaric Alps at the eastern edge of its territory. It typically lives at altitudes above 700 metres (2,300 ft) above sea level, even reaching 2,000 metres (6,600 ft) altitude. The western Alps (in France and Italy) are inhabited by a similar species, Lanza's alpine salamander (Salamandra lanzai), in only one small area. S. atra generally live in forested biomes, particularly deciduous-coniferous mixes. They also can inhabit meadows or grasslands in the mountains, and tend to do well with a mix of tree types.

Their range spans several nations, including Slovenia, Croatia, Bosnia and Herzegovina, Montenegro, Kosovo, France, Italy, Austria, and Switzerland.

== Home range and territoriality ==
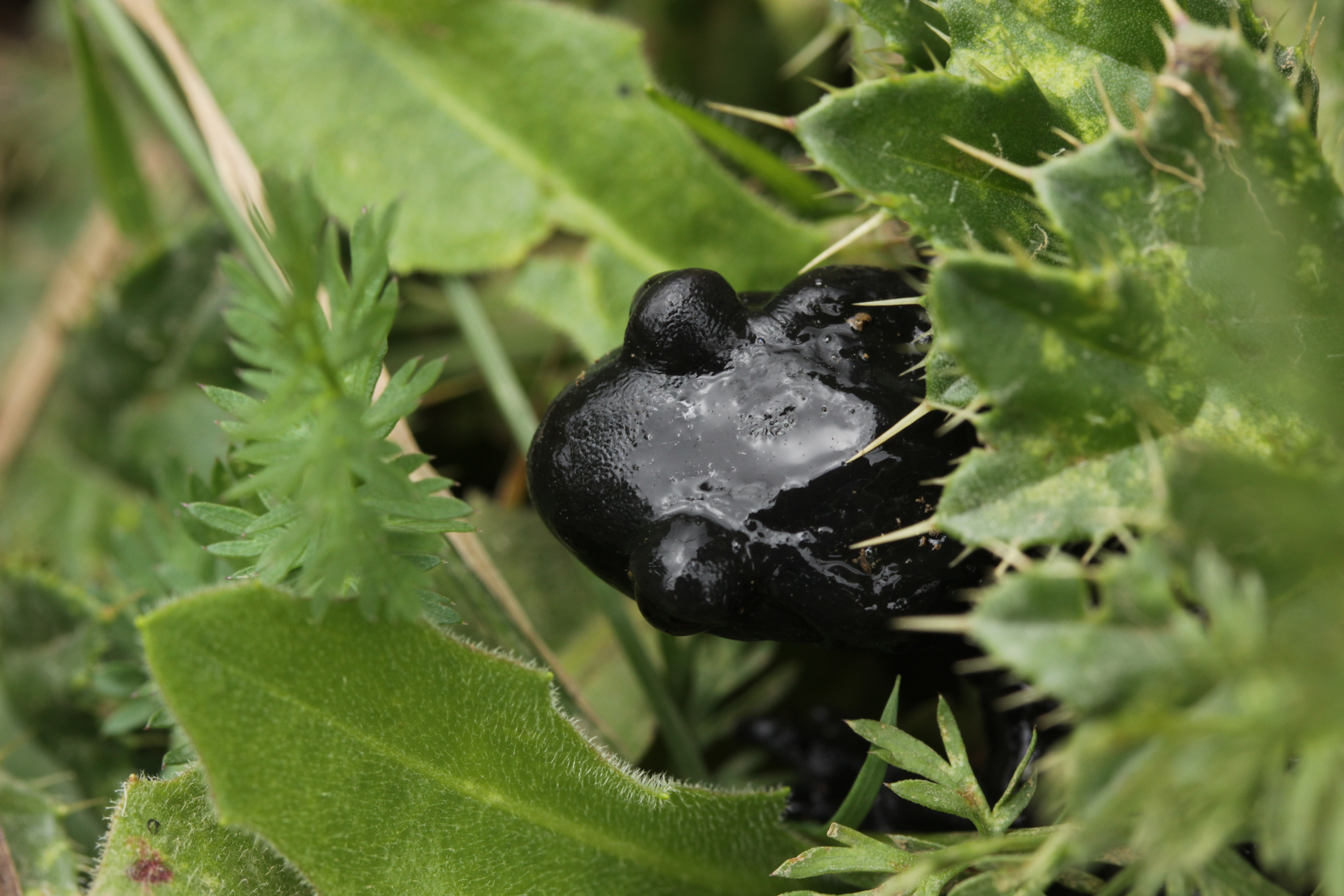
Alpine salamanders in leafy terrain

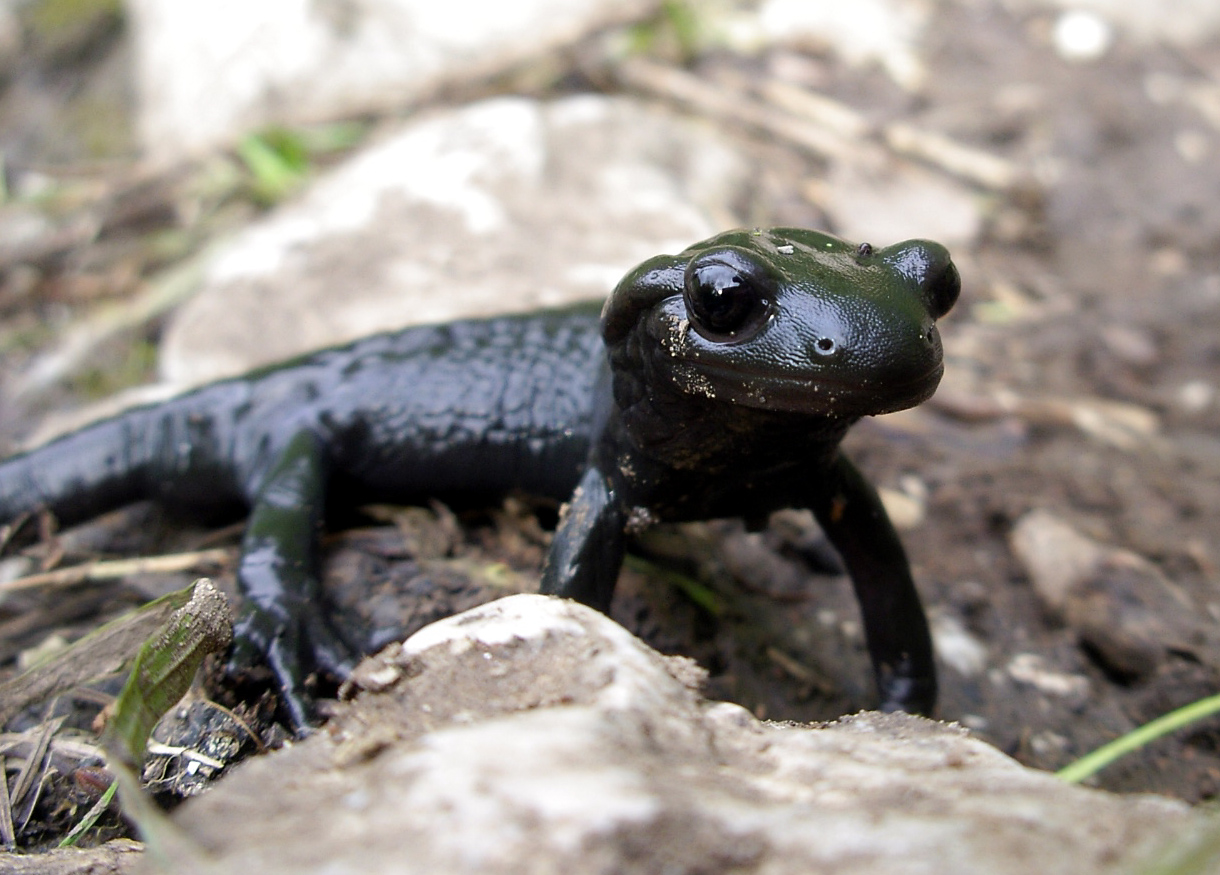
A salamander in Slovenia

They thrive in forest environments that have silver fir and beech trees. Coniferous forests that have high proportions of Norway spruce and European larch trees also provide adequate habitats, even though the salamanders live on the ground floor. Because alpine salamanders are completely terrestrial, they have on-land territories that they tend to return to throughout the day and for refuge. They often return to the same sites for much of their lives. Whenever they leave their sites, they expose themselves to predation and also to the chance of losing their site. Alpine salamanders are ectothermic, so losing a refuge or shelter could leave them exposed to the elements and be extremely costly, if not fatal, due their lack of an internal thermoregulation mechanism.

This high dependency on a quality nest site supports the theory that many terrestrial salamanders, including S. atra, engage in territorial behaviour. Capture-recapture methods suggest that the species is very stationary; 12 metres (39 ft) was the maximum observed distance traveled by one individual during the summer season. About 120 individuals per hectare were counted in most suitable areas with over 2000 individuals per hectare also observed, suggesting that this rather cryptic species is quite abundant.

=== Territorial behaviour ===
They employ scent-marking techniques for territorial behaviour, and to mark their territories using faecal pellets so they can identify their own shelters. Scent-marking is an intra-species communication, where chemical signals convey specific messages to other S. atra individuals. Alpine salamanders can determine if a faecal pellet they find has been left by a member of their same sex and/or species. Thus, this technique serves a double purpose to warn other salamanders that that particular location has already been claimed.

Females are more likely to return to their home site, while males are more emboldened to enter another male's territory. Their faecal pellets allow them to both participate in homing behaviour, or returning to their own site, and territoriality, and determine intruders on their territory or invade the spaces of others.

== Conservation ==
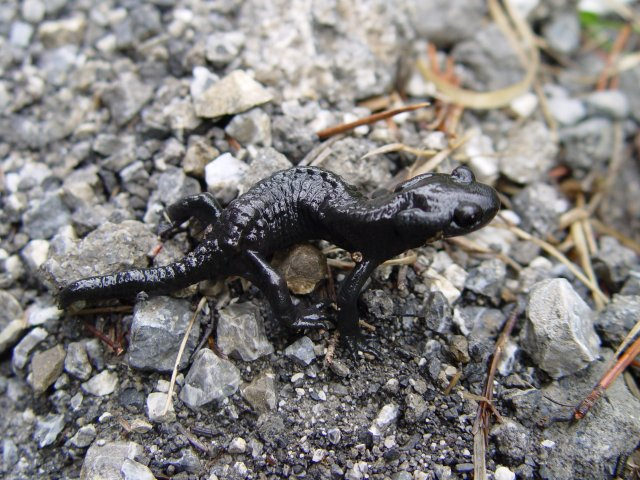
S. atra in rocky terrain.

Alpine salamanders are not resilient to habitat changes (few terrestrial salamanders are), so risks of climate change altering their living spaces is severe. Although alpine salamanders are listed as Least Concern on IUCN Red List, their numbers are decreasing. Additionally, some subspecies of S. atra are in greater danger. Population numbers are declining in S. a. aurorae.

One of the greatest dangers to alpine salamanders overall is commercial deforestation in their habitats. Machinery like tractors or other forestry tools can compress the soil, eliminating some of the small insects that S. atra eat or eliminating potential nooks and burrows for them to use as shelters. Many scientists propose changes in the timber industry as an attempt to heal these habitats. The salamanders may also change their morphology as global temperatures rise. Amphibians and other organisms that do not internally regulate their body temperature may need adaption mechanisms to remain at ideal physiological temperatures in the face of changing climates. Other issues like acid rain or precipitation changes could prompt many animals, including alpine salamanders, to be forced out of their habitat. Alpine salamanders play a crucial role in their ecosystems. There are already animal and ecosystem conservation laws in Europe, but many scholars recommend additional ones to protect the flora and fauna.

== Predators ==
Due to their toxicity, as well as decreased concentration of animals at high altitudes, researchers are unsure of consistent predators for alpine salamanders with limited observation. These salamanders do move slowly, which could increase their risk of being caught. Generally, predators of the broad category of toxic Salamandra species can include birds, rats, and snakes, as well as other, larger carnivorous mammals like raccoons, mink, wild boar, and foxes.

One notable predator of S. atra is young snakes. In particular, juvenile European adders (Vipera berus) pose a risk because they live at similarly high altitudes to alpine salamanders. S. atra has been suggested to make up just under half of these snakes' diets in some locations. They may hunt for alpine salamanders during early morning hours, when S. atra is most active. There also has been evidence of these snakes recorded swallowing alpine salamanders. V. berus, alongside the grass snake (Natrix natrix), are noted predators of alpine salamanders in the Italian Alps.

== Feeding ==
Male and female alpine salamanders have relatively similar diets. Some specific organisms they prey on include species such as beetles, snails, millipedes, and spiders, but alpine salamanders display preferences among prey. S. atra typically consume organisms from the Coleoptera and mollusca taxa. These taxa are the most crucial component of their diet. They also tend to eat larger prey since they themselves are larger salamanders. Such preference indicates a dimensional selectivity, in which the energy intake of prey consumption is maximised. Though alpine salamanders have definite dietary preferences, they have a substantial amount of variation in their diet that corresponds to their own optimal physical needs and prey-catching abilities.

== Mating and interactions ==
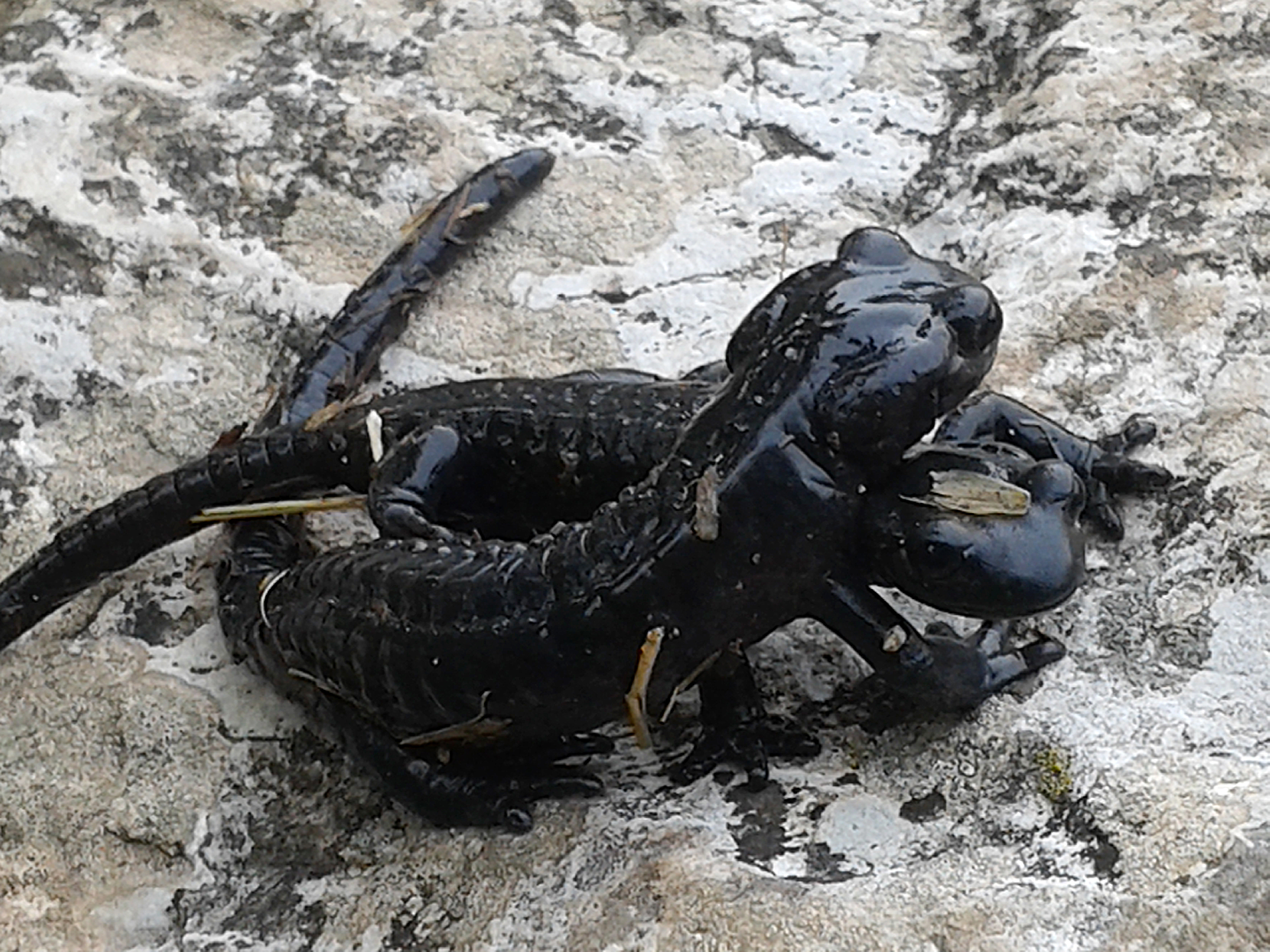
S. atra interactions - MHNT

Mating video

=== Mating pattern ===
The alpine salamander engages in a promiscuous mating pattern, engaging in multiple partner pairings. Males travel farther than females, potentially to follow a scent emitted by females, and typically while still in their juvenile stage. Female S. atra find and defend their shelters, which is a potential reason that they may stay more local than males.

=== Male-male behaviour ===
Males are more likely to engage in chasing other males, as well as actually fighting with each other. Often, one male will mount the other, loosely grasp it with his forearms, and start rubbing his head on the other male. The two males will switch roles, and in one studied interaction, continued like this for seven minutes before parting ways. In a second documented fight, the behaviour was more intense. When one member tried to leave, the other male chased it to re-engage. This encounter lasted eight minutes. There is both photographic and video evidence of this behaviour. Researchers are unsure if it is caused by territoriality, homosexuality, confusion on sexual identification and mistaken mating, or true combat.

== Gestation and reproduction ==
Alpine salamanders occur with a sex ratio of 1:1. Mating occurs on land. The male clasps the female at the forelegs, and fertilisation is internal. S. atra are viviparous, with their young born alive, and unlike many other amphibians, do not go through metamorphosis. They give birth to two young, sometimes three or four. New young alpine salamanders may measure as long as 50 millimetres (2 in) at birth, with the mother measuring only 120 millimetres (4.7 in).

Female alpine salamanders have uteruses that are composed of a single luminal epithelial cell layer, connective tissue, and smooth muscle. The uterine eggs are large and numerous, but, as a rule, only one develops fully in each uterus. The embryo is nourished on the yolk of the other eggs, which more or less dissolve to form a large mass of nutrient matter. The egg mass can be as long as 25–40 mm. The embryo passes through three stages:

1. The first stage is when they are still enclosed within the egg and living on its own yolk.
2. The second stage is when they are free, within the vitelline mass, eating it directly with their mouths.
3. The final stage occurs when there is no more vitelline mass. The embryo has long external gills, which serve as an exchange of nutritive fluid through the maternal uterus, these gills functioning in the same way as the chorionic villi of the mammalian egg.

Generally, at altitudes of 650–1,000 metres (2,130–3,280 ft) above sea level, a pregnancy lasts two years, and at altitudes of 1,400-1,700 m above sea level, the pregnancy lasts around three years, though anything within a 2-4 year range is considered standard. Alpine salamander embryos are unique in how they are able to take in these nutrients through a long gestation. A portion of the mother's uterine wall becomes nourishment after the salamanders have already eaten the unfertilised eggs, (called oophagy or stage 1 and 2). They then partake in epitheliophagy, or stage 3, where they ingest these zona trophica cells until birth, and have special tooth-like developments that allow it to do so without detriment to the mother.

== Physiology ==
=== Glands and toxins ===
Alpine salamanders have poison glands. They are known to produce some alkaloid molecules and peptide products, which have a mustard-like scent associated with them. Salamandra bioproduction is still a developing research area. Salamandarines are a chemical secretion produced by the skin of alpine salamanders, as well as some fire salamanders. They are neurotoxins, with synthesis via a biochemical pathway, completely independent of dietary intake. This means that they make these chemicals within their bodies, not as a result of ingesting poisonous substances. The starting material for this nerve-block is most likely cholesterol, and it is about twice as potent as cyanide. This pales in comparison to other toxins produced by salamanders, but S. atra not only use this powerful substance to paralyse prey; they may have antimicrobial properties that protect them against bacterial and fungal infections. Salamandorone is another biochemical compound produced by S. atra, and though it is less potent against prey it is the strongest antimicrobial agent these salamanders have.

There are two main categories of toxin studied, samandarine and samandarone. There are also many other compounds, as well as miscellaneous alkaloid secretions. It is hypothesised that salamandarine is more commonly produced in alpine salamanders as a predator defense mechanism, and salamandorones are produced where there is greater infection risk. There is also noted geographic variation in toxin production by alpine salamanders.

=== Immunobiology and protection ===
Samandarone, a toxin they produce via skin secretion, has noted antimicrobial activity. In one study, this toxin was present where there was infection risk, but at low concentration. There is a wide arsenal of toxins produced by S. atra, many of which are antimicrobial or could be precursors to other protective molecules. Nonetheless, the alpine salamander has generally avoided infection with amphiban chytrid fungus Batrachochytrium dendrobatidis (Bd) compared to other amphibian species. This dangerous fungal infection has reduced amphibian populations on every continent. Bd is present in the Alps where alpine salamanders live, but in a study performed in 2012, there were no salamanders who tested positive when swabbed. This may be because Bd infections are more common in species who spend more of their time in water, and since the alpine salamanders are terrestrial, they are less susceptible. An alternate hypothesis proposes that S. atra are resistant via their skin microbiome or a produced molecule, thus granting them immunity. This theory is untested, but considering how many salamanders excrete biological toxins, plausible.
