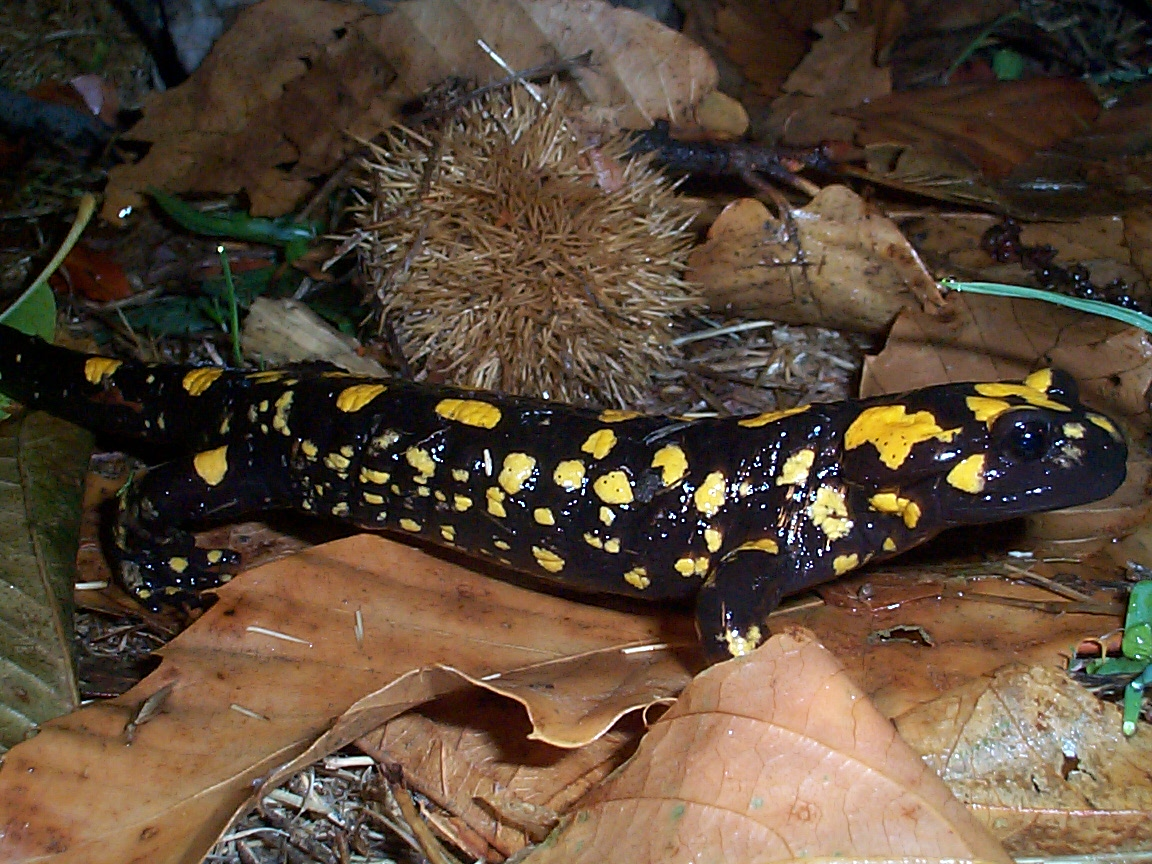

Conservation status
- Least Concern (IUCN 3.1)

Scientific classification
- Kingdom: Animalia
- Phylum: Chordata
- Class: Amphibia
- Order: Urodela
- Family: Salamandridae
- Genus: Salamandra
- Species: S. corsica

Binomial name
- Salamandra corsica Savi, 1838

Synonyms
- Salamandra salamandra ssp. corsica Savi, 1838

= Corsican fire salamander =

Species of amphibian

The Corsican fire salamander (Salamandra corsica) is a species of salamander in the family Salamandridae found only on the island of Corsica as an endemic species. In former times, this species was known as a subspecies of the widespread but continental-distributed fire salamander, which may appear quite similar.

== Description ==
Salamandra corsica are glossy black salamanders with yellow splotches on their dorsum that have adult sizes ranging from 120 - 300 mm. Males are generally smaller than females. The head is wider than it is long, and is rounded in shape. This species possess bright yellow colored paratoid glands and two lines of poison glands that run in parallel down their ventral sides, and two irregular rows of glands down the tail. The snout and toes are blunt and round, as is the tip of the tail. Males have pronounced cloacas, whose opening is a single longitudinal fold. Salamandra corsica has clear costal grooves running down the ventral sides. These salamanders have smooth, shiny skin, and easily visible yet reduced paratoid glands compared to other species in the Salamandra genus.

== Habitat ==
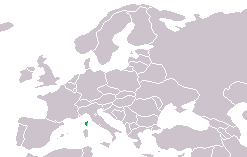
Map of distribution

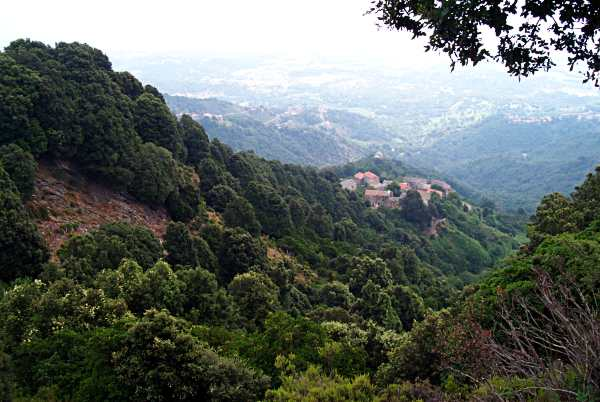
Deciduous mountain forests near Monte Cinto - habitat of Salamandra corsica

The Corsican fire salamander mainly lives in the deciduous mountain forests of the island. On the west coast near in the Calanques de Piana, salamanders have been found near sea level, but in general they appear as inhabitant of forests with deciduous oaks, such as sessile oak, downy oak and sweet chestnut gardens near the human settlements. Forests with the maritime pine and the Corsican black pine (Pinus nigra subsp. salzmannii var. corsicana) are also inhabited. Densely growing ferns (Pteridium aquilinum), tree heath, and other shrubby vegetation might diminish the fire salamander population, also as evergreen sclerophyllic woods, such as holly oak forests because of their minor precipitation sum. Beech forests are populated in the Castagniccia and also in the south of the island where this tree assembles dense azonal forests and does not appear mainly as upper tree line, as in the western mountain ranges of Corsica.

The midranges of the Corsican mountains seem to be preferred because of their constant humidity and moderate temperatures. Constant water in the creeks coming down from the summits supports good development of the larvae over the hot summer. They are born when the snow has melted away and the streams are safe again for the newborn larvae. Their surroundings and stone runs also offer the adults preferred places to hide from the daylight or the summer drought.

== Unexpected ways of reproduction ==
The German herpetologist Robert Mertens found a pregnant Corsican fire salamander in the Restonica Valley that gave birth to four offspring without gills and already with the characteristic black and yellow of the adults. At the same time, he found normally developing aquatic larvae with their three characteristic feathery external gills on each side of their heads and camouflage blending into the pond's substrate. The reproductive ability of viviparity is well known from the fire salamander's northwest Spanish subspecies, S. s. bernardezi (Asturian fire salamander) and the alpine salamander (S. atra) from the central and east Alps. This can be interpreted as a local adaptation to xerothermic climate conditions and lack of ponds and brooks.

== Threats ==
The Corsican fire salamander is threatened by habitat loss, forest works, road construction, and traffic. The species may also be threatened by water pollution, wildfires, and wood pasture. Introducing invasive fish species, such as rainbow trout in the larval habitats diminishes the reproduction of the island's fire salamanders significantly. Indigenous anadromous fish, such as the Mediterranean trout Salmo cettii, which is also highly endangered, seems not to have a significant influence on the amphibians.
