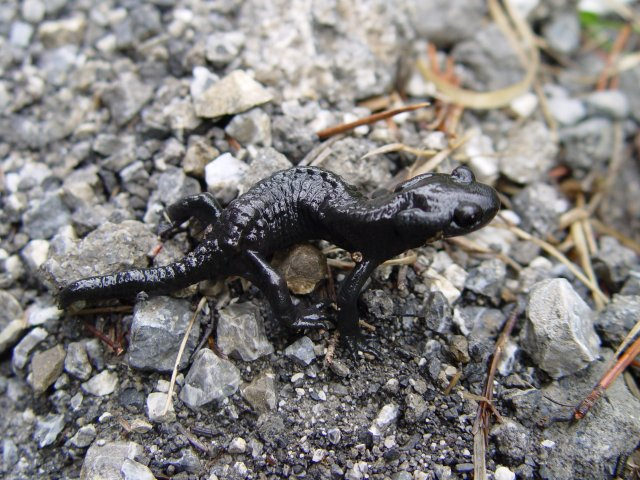
- Salamandra atra

Scientific classification
- Kingdom: Animalia
- Phylum: Chordata
- Class: Amphibia
- Order: Urodela
- Family: Salamandridae
- Subfamily: Salamandrinae
- Genus: Salamandra; Laurenti, 1768

Type species
- Lacerta salamandra Linnaeus, 1758

Species
- See text

= Salamandra =

Salamandra Temporal range: Paleocene–present

Genus of amphibians

Salamandra is genus of poisonous salamanders inhabiting central and southern Europe, Northern Africa, and western Asia. Six species are currently recognized:

Image	Common name	Scientific name	Distribution
	North African fire salamander	Salamandra algira Bedriaga, 1883	The Maghreb; Algeria and Morocco
	alpine salamander	Salamandra atra Laurenti, 1768	central, eastern and Dinaric Alps
	Corsican fire salamander	Salamandra corsica Savi, 1838	Corsica
	Near Eastern fire salamander	Salamandra infraimmaculata Martens, 1885	West Asia/Middle East; Iran, Iraq, Israel, Lebanon, Syria, and Turkey
	Lanza's alpine salamander	Salamandra lanzai Nascetti, Andreone, Capula et Bullini, 1988	France and Italy.
	fire salamander	Salamandra salamandra (Linnaeus, 1758)	southern and central Europe
