= Crocodile newt =

Crocodile newt may refer to:

- Anderson's crocodile newt (Echinotriton andersoni)
- Tylototriton (genus):
  - Himalayan newt (Tylototriton verrucosus)
  - Red-tailed knobby newt (Tylototriton kweichowensis)
  - Vietnamese crocodile newt (Tylototriton vietnamensis)
  - Ziegler's crocodile newt (Tylototriton ziegleri)
