= Tylototriton ngoclinhensis =

Ngoc Linh crocodile newt

Conservation status
- Endangered (IUCN 3.1)

Scientific classification
- Kingdom: Animalia
- Phylum: Chordata
- Class: Amphibia
- Order: Urodela
- Family: Salamandridae
- Genus: Tylototriton
- Species: T. ngoclinhensis

Binomial name
- Tylototriton ngoclinhensis Phung, Pham, Nguyen, Ninh, Nguyen, Bernardes, Le, Ziegler & Nguyen, 2023

Species of crocodile newt

Tylototriton ngoclinhensis, the Ngoc Linh crocodile newt, is a species of crocodile newt native to the Central Highlands region of Vietnam. First discovered in 2018, it was described as a new species in 2023. Due to its small range, the newt is considered to be threatened and it has been proposed for it to be classified as endangered on the IUCN Red List.

== Distribution ==
Tylototriton ngoclinhensis is the eighth taxon of Tylototriton to be described in Vietnam, but the first to be recorded in its Central Highlands region. The range of T. ngoclinhensis is limited and is currently thought to be restricted to montane forests near water bodies on Ngọc Linh. This means that T. ngoclinhensis has the southernmost range of all members of Tylototriton in Asia. The habitat of T. ngoclinhensis is located at an altitude of 1,800 to 2,300 meters above sea level, the highest among crocodile newts.

== Description ==
Tylototriton ngoclinhensis is a moderate-sized and robust species of newt, with a snout-vent length ranging from 60.8 to 66.5 mm in males and 72.5-75.6 mm in females. Tail lengths range from 57.6 to 61.8 mm in males and 62.9–67.9 mm in females. Males are thought to be smaller than females.

The body of T. ngoclinhensis is black with orange-red markings covering its head, tail, limbs, and vertebral ridge. In addition, a black line is present which runs from the shoulder to the eye. Secondary sex characteristics are present in the species. The cloaca of males are known to have a longer slit than those of females. In addition, the inner cloacal walls of males contain papilla, whereas females do not have papilla inside their inner cloacal walls.
