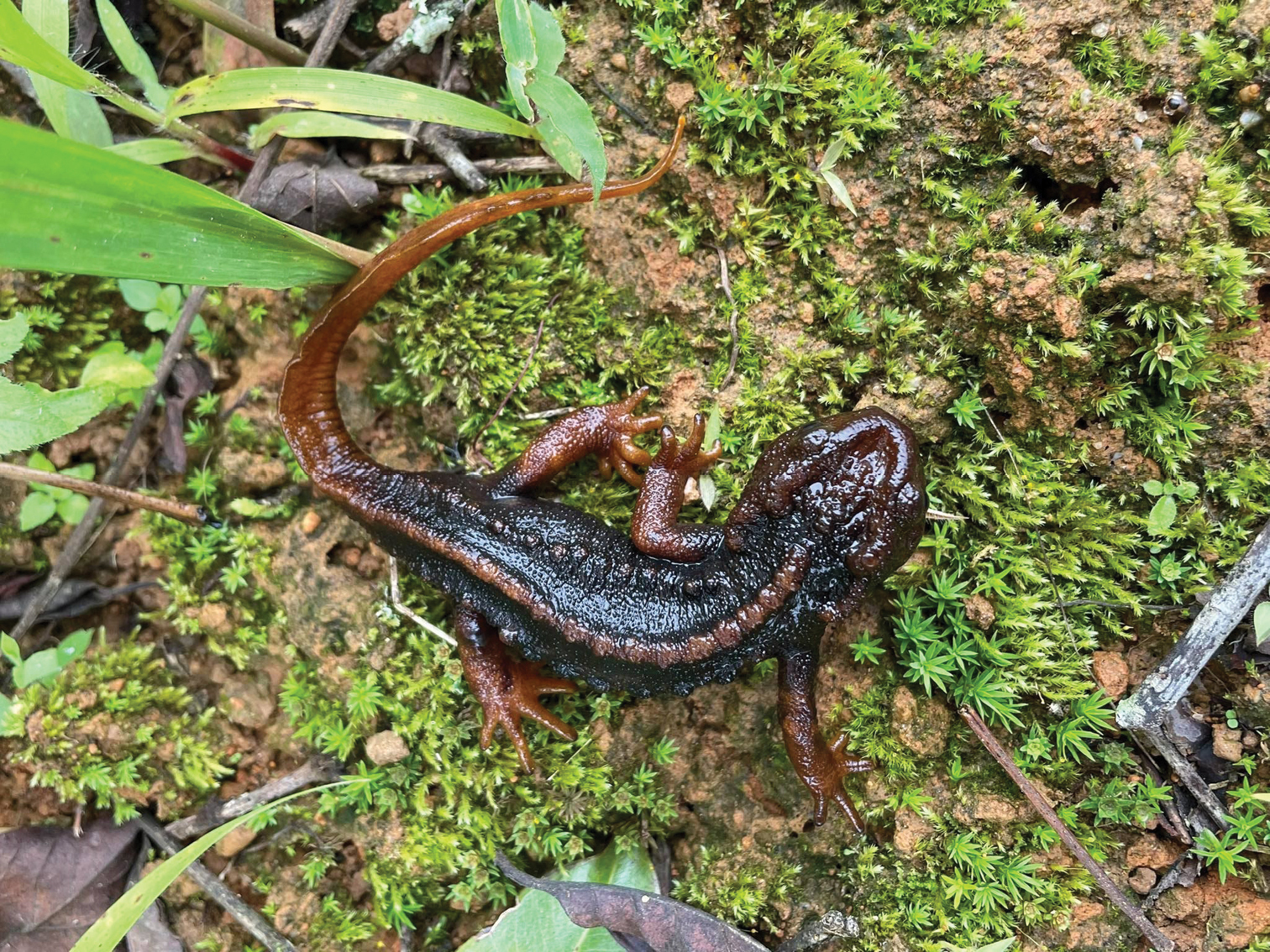

Scientific classification
- Kingdom: Animalia
- Phylum: Chordata
- Class: Amphibia
- Order: Urodela
- Family: Salamandridae
- Genus: Tylototriton
- Species: T. umphangensis

Binomial name
- Tylototriton umphangensis Pomchote, Peerachidacho, Hernandez, Sapewisut, Khonsue, Thammachoti & Nishikawa, 2021

= Tylototriton umphangensis =

Species of newt

Tylototriton umphangensis, also known as the Umphang crocodile newt (Thai: Ka Tang Nam Umphang), is a species of newt native to the evergreen hills of Thailand. It is a medium-sized species measuring from snout-to-vent 65.6–75.3 millimeters. Its body is slim and long with rough skin. The top is a dark-brown to blackish-brown color with the belly being slightly lighter.

== Discovery ==
It was discovered based on four adult male specimens, with the holotype being CUMZ-A-8243. Both the holotype and the paratypes were collected at the Umphang Wildlife Sanctuary, Tak Province, western Thailand.

The species name umphangensis refers to the type locality, which is the Umphang Wildlife Sanctuary.

== Taxonomy ==
It belongs to the genus Tylototriton, which contains 32 species, five of which are known from Thailand. Within this genus, it is sister to Tylototriton uyenoi placing it within the subgenus Tylototriton. It shows its close relationship to T. uyenoi with similar morphology.
