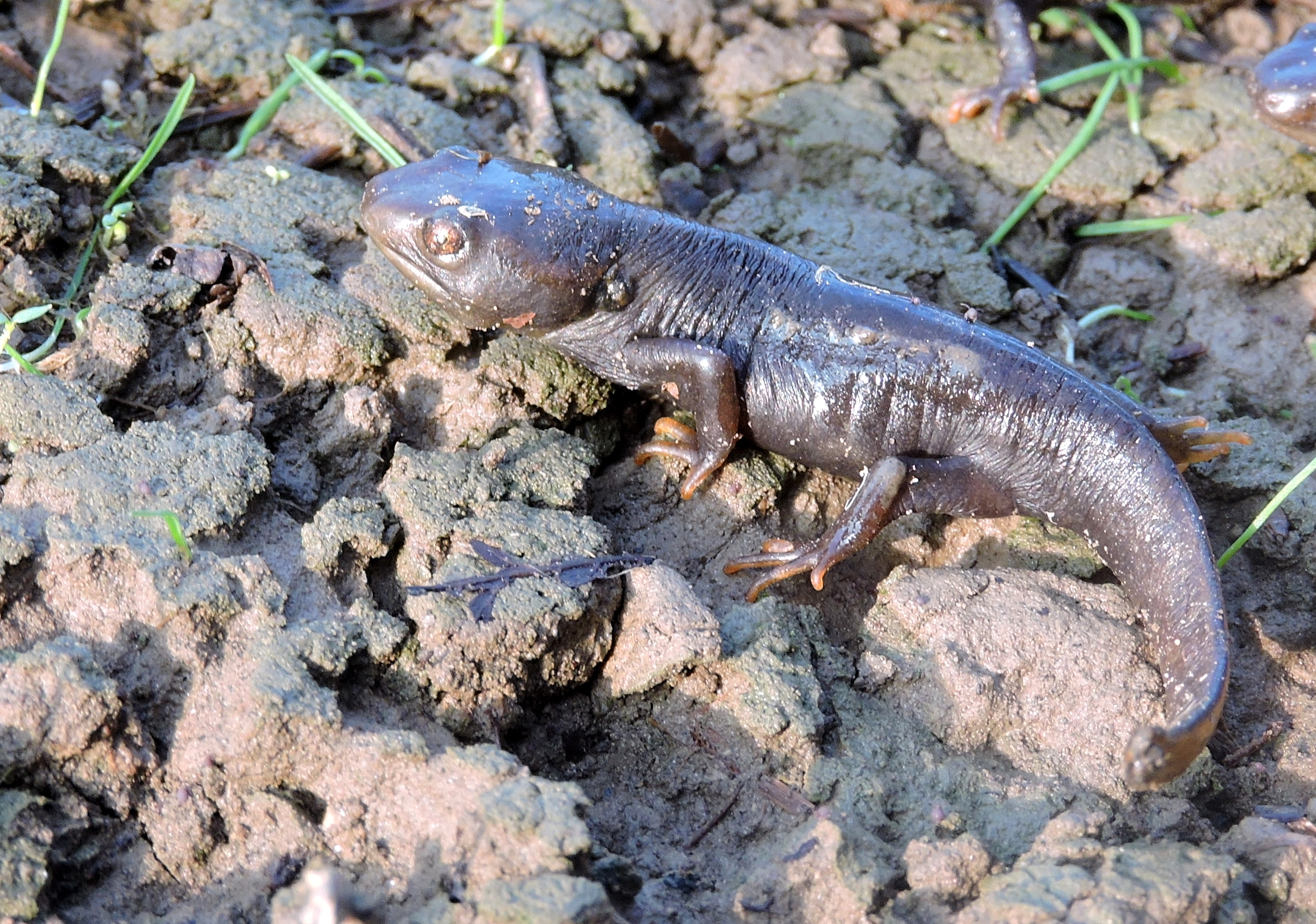

Scientific classification
- Kingdom: Animalia
- Phylum: Chordata
- Class: Amphibia
- Order: Urodela
- Family: Salamandridae
- Genus: Tylototriton
- Species: T. himalayanus

Binomial name
- Tylototriton himalayanus Khatiwada, Wang, Ghimire, Vasudevan, Paudel, and Jiang, 2015

= Tylototriton himalayanus =

Species of salamander

Tylototriton himalayanus is a species of salamander in the family Salamandridae. It is known from the Ilam District in eastern Nepal (its type locality from where it was described in 2015), Darjeeling in northwestern India, and western Bhutan. It is one of the only two species of salamanders found in India (the other being Tylototriton verrucosus). (Note: The status of Tylototriton verrucosus populations outside northeastern Myanmar/western Yunnan (China) is unclear.)

== Description ==
Adult males measure 63–88 mm (2.5–3.5 in) and adult females 66–97 mm (2.6–3.8 in) in snout–vent length, and respectively 131–154 mm (5.2–6.1 in) and 136–186 mm (5.4–7.3 in) in total length. The head is bluntly oval with a blunt, flat snout. There are two distinct lines of dorsolateral bony ridges on the head, greatly separated from each other. The body has pairs of longitudinal lines of 16 knob-like dorsal warts. The tail is laterally compressed and with a well-developed fin fold. Coloration is dark to light brown dorsally, turning light brown dorsolaterally and creamy ventrally.

== Habitat and conservation ==
Tylototriton himalayanus occurs in subtropical hill forests near puddles, lakes, and rice paddies at elevations of 900–2,317 m (2,953–7,602 ft) above sea level. They breed in permanent and temporary ponds after heavy monsoon rains, starting in March or April. Outside the breeding season they are more terrestrial and hide under logs, bushes, and stones.

As of mid 2021, this species has not been evaluated by the International Union for Conservation of Nature (IUCN). It is probably suffering from populations declines caused by environment changes and anthropogenic disturbances such as the rapid disappearance of the Himalayan wetlands.
