= Tylototriton notialis =

Conservation status
- Vulnerable (IUCN 3.1)

Scientific classification
- Kingdom: Animalia
- Phylum: Chordata
- Class: Amphibia
- Order: Urodela
- Family: Salamandridae
- Genus: Tylototriton
- Species: T. notialis

Binomial name
- Tylototriton notialis Stuart, Phimmachak, Sivongxay, and Robichaud, 2010

Synonyms
- Yaotriton notialis (Stuart, Phimmachak, Sivongxay, and Robichaud, 2010)

Species of amphibian

Tylototriton notialis, also known as the Laos knobby newt, southern crocodile newt, or Khammouan crocodile newt, is a species of newt in the family Salamandridae. It is only known from Khammouane province, central Laos. The Vietnamese record has been described as a new species, Tylototriton thaiorum.

The type locality is an evergreen mixed deciduous–pine forest in the Nakai-Nam Theun Biodiversity Conservation Area; the newts were found in and near a small stream. It is likely that Tylototriton notialis will also be found in adjacent areas of Vietnam. Based on molecular genetic data, it belongs to the Tylototriton asperrimus group of knobby newts. Tylototriton notialis is a small newt, with total length of about 11–14 cm (4.3–5.5 in).
