= Tylototriton ngarsuensis =

Conservation status
- Data Deficient (IUCN 3.1)

Scientific classification
- Kingdom: Animalia
- Phylum: Chordata
- Class: Amphibia
- Order: Urodela
- Family: Salamandridae
- Genus: Tylototriton
- Species: T. ngarsuensis

Binomial name
- Tylototriton ngarsuensis Grismer et al., 2018

Species of amphibian

Tylototriton ngarsuensis, the Ywangan crocodile newt, is a species of newt in the family Salamandridae that is endemic to Myanmar. It is only known from Ngar Su village, which is located in the vicinity of Ywangan Township.

It can be physically differentiated from other crocodile newts by its shorter head, larger size, rib module morphology, and its very drab, dark coloration. It also breeds later in the year. While T. ngarsuensis is currently recognized as a distinct taxon by the IUCN, Amphibian Species of the World considers it a synonym of Tylototriton shanorum.

Like many other Asian newts, T. ngarsuensis is heavily threatened by harvesting for the pet and medical trade, which will be especially detrimental due to its restricted distribution.
