= Tylototriton vietnamensis =

Conservation status
- Vulnerable (IUCN 3.1)

Scientific classification
- Kingdom: Animalia
- Phylum: Chordata
- Class: Amphibia
- Order: Urodela
- Family: Salamandridae
- Genus: Tylototriton
- Species: T. vietnamensis

Binomial name
- Tylototriton vietnamensis Böhme, Schöttler, Truong and Köhler, 2005

Species of amphibian

Tylototriton vietnamensis, the Vietnamese crocodile newt or Vietnamese knobby newt, is a species of newt in the family Salamandridae. It is known from four localities in northern Vietnam where it occurs in and near ponds within dense bamboo vegetation. It is quite likely that it also will be found in adjacent areas of China and possibly Laos. It is possible that specimens earlier identified as T. asperrimus are in fact T. vietnamensis. However, based on molecular genetic data, its closest relative is T. hainanensis.

Tylototriton vietnamensis is a small newt, with total length 12 cm (4.7 in).

The main threat to this species is habitat degradation.
