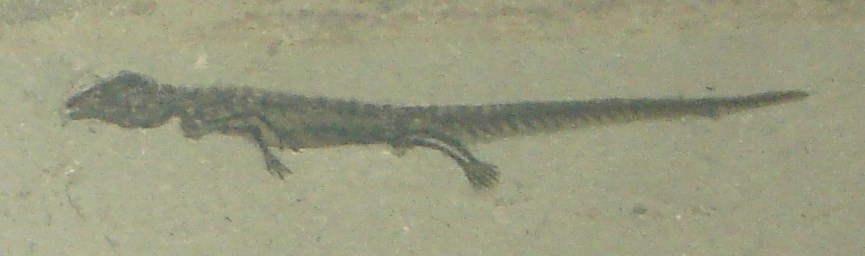
- Chelotriton paradoxus fossil at Museo di Storia Naturale, Milano

Scientific classification
- Domain: Eukaryota
- Kingdom: Animalia
- Phylum: Chordata
- Class: Amphibia
- Order: Urodela
- Family: Salamandridae
- Genus: †Chelotriton; Pomel, 1853

Species
- †Chelotriton paradoxus Pomel, 1853 †Chelotriton robustus Westphal, 1980

= Chelotriton =

Chelotriton Temporal range: Neogene, 23.03–2.588 Ma

Extinct genus of amphibians

Chelotriton is an extinct genus of prehistoric salamanders that lived in Europe and Central Asia during the Neogene. It closely resembles the extant genera Tylototriton and Echinotriton.

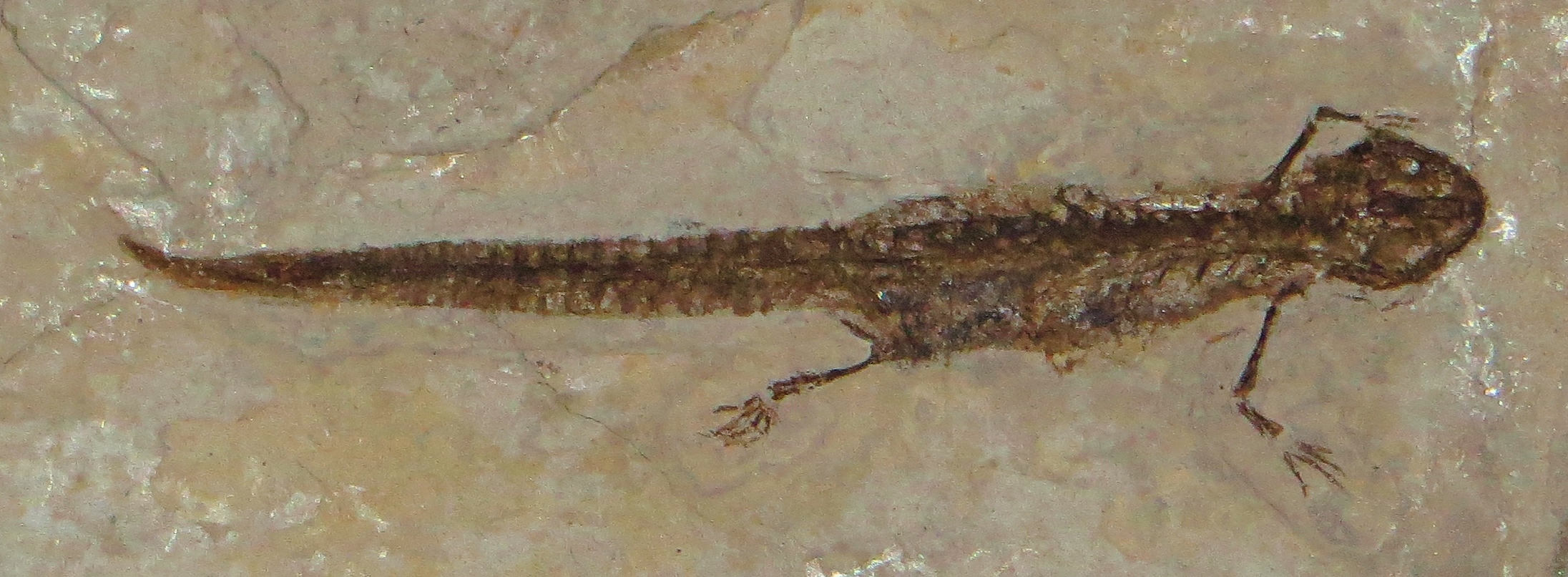
Chelotriton fossil at Museo di Storia Naturale, Milano
