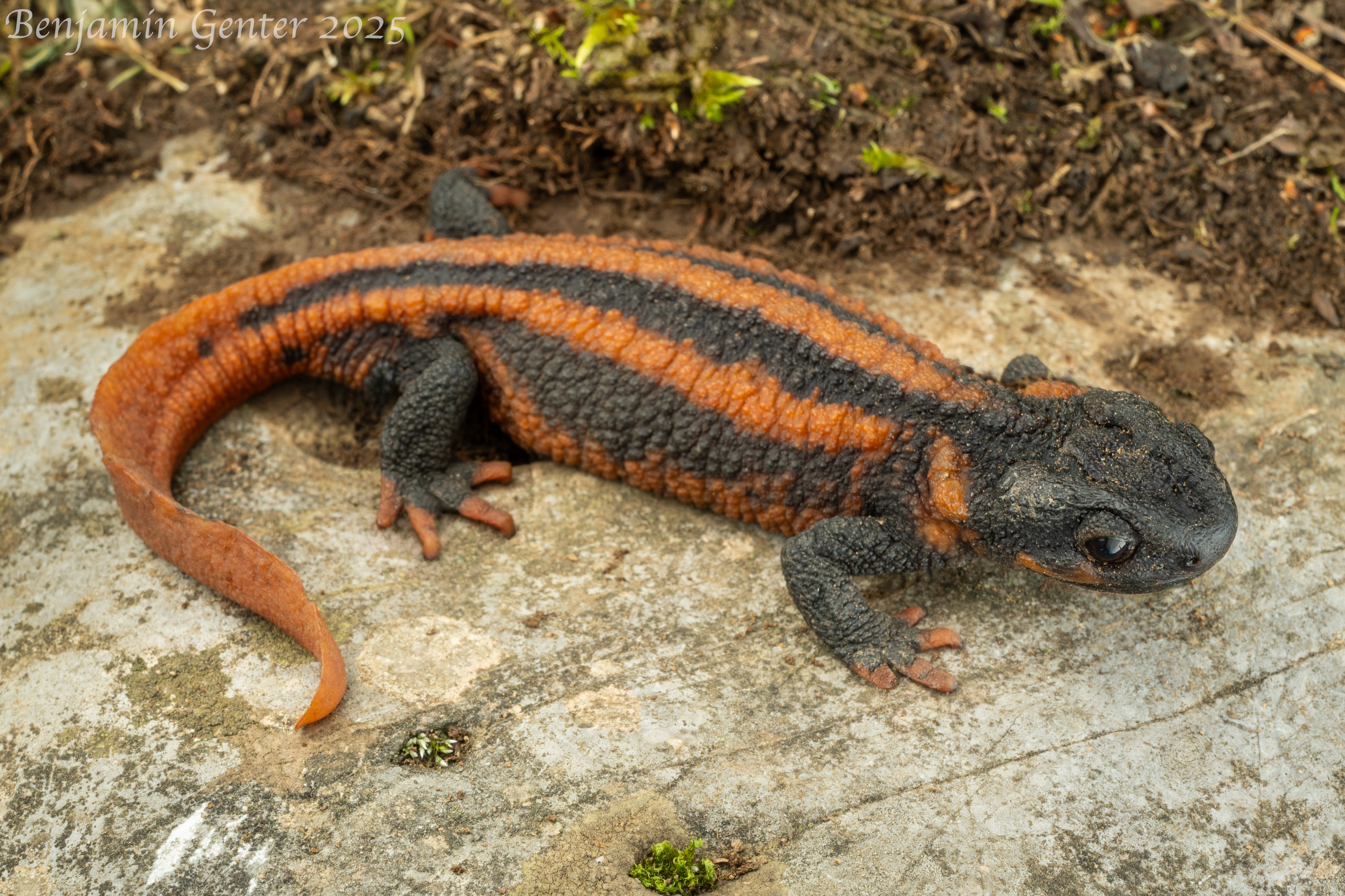

Conservation status
- Vulnerable (IUCN 3.1)

Scientific classification
- Kingdom: Animalia
- Phylum: Chordata
- Class: Amphibia
- Order: Urodela
- Family: Salamandridae
- Genus: Tylototriton
- Species: T. kweichowensis

Binomial name
- Tylototriton kweichowensis Fang & Chang, 1932

= Red-tailed knobby newt =

Species of salamander

The red-tailed knobby newt or Kweichow (crocodile) newt (Tylototriton kweichowensis) is a species of salamander in the family Salamandridae. It is found in western Guizhou ("Kweichow" being an old spelling of Guizhou) and north-eastern Yunnan, China. It is most closely related to emperor newt (Tylototriton shanjing) and Himalayan newt (T. verrucosus).

== Description ==
The red-tailed knobby newt is a relatively large, robust newt. Their total length is 155–210 mm (6.1–8.3 in), females being larger than males. They live in small ponds, slowly flowing streams and surrounding shady and moist grassy slopes with many hiding places. Outside the reproductive season, they are rather terrestrial. The reproductive season is from early May to early July, coinciding with the rainy season.

== Distribution ==
The red-tailed knobby newt has been recorded in Bijie, Dafang, Hezhang, Nayong, Shuicheng, Weining, and Zhijin counties of western Guizhou, and Yiliang and Yongshan counties in northeastern Yunnan (Zhao 1998).

== Diet ==
The red-tailed knobby newt feeds on worms, insects, larva, and their smaller newts. They can ingest small frogs and small toads. In captivity they often eat wax worms, mealworms, crickets, and even small fish like guppies.

== Captivity ==
In captivity they should have a 15-20 gallon tank for housing two or three newts. 5-10 gallon tank is best to house one newt. 40-60 gallon tank for housing 5 or six newts.
