= Tylototriton dabienicus =

Scientific classification
- Domain: Eukaryota
- Kingdom: Animalia
- Phylum: Chordata
- Class: Amphibia
- Order: Urodela
- Family: Salamandridae
- Genus: Tylototriton
- Species: T. dabienicus

Binomial name
- Tylototriton dabienicus Chen, Wang, and Tao, 2010

Species of salamander

Tylototriton dabienicus is a species of salamander in the family Salamandridae from central China. It was formerly considered to be a subspecies of Tylotriton wenxianensis.
