= Brachycormus =

Brachycormus Temporal range: Upper Oligocene–Middle Miocene, 29.30–15 Ma

Scientific classification
- Kingdom: Animalia
- Phylum: Chordata
- Class: Amphibia
- Order: Urodela
- Family: Salamandridae
- Genus: †Brachycormus; Meyer, 1860

Type species
- † Triton noachicus Goldfuss, 1831

Extinct genus of amphibians

Brachycormus is an extinct genus of salamandrid amphibian from the Oligocene–Miocene of Europe.

Neoteny is evident in some larval specimens by the retention of branchial arches and a high degree of ossification in the hyobranchial skeleton. The reason for this neoteny may be explained by a drop in global temperature during the Oligocene cooling event, which may have induced a delay in somatic development in relation to the gonadal development of these animals, thus allowing them to breed at the larval stage and shift the timing of their developmental change to cope with the changes in climate.
