= Tylototriton broadoridgus =

Scientific classification
- Kingdom: Animalia
- Phylum: Chordata
- Class: Amphibia
- Order: Urodela
- Family: Salamandridae
- Genus: Tylototriton
- Species: T. broadoridgus

Binomial name
- Tylototriton broadoridgus Shen, Jiang, and Mo, 2012

Species of salamander

Tylototriton broadoridgus is a species of salamander in the family Salamandridae from the Tianping Mountains of Sangzhi County, Hunan, China.
