= Caucasian salamander =

Conservation status
- Near Threatened (IUCN 3.1)

Scientific classification
- Kingdom: Animalia
- Phylum: Chordata
- Class: Amphibia
- Order: Urodela
- Family: Salamandridae
- Subfamily: Salamandrinae
- Genus: Mertensiella; Wolterstorff, 1925
- Species: M. caucasica

Binomial name
- Mertensiella caucasica (Waga, 1876)

Species of amphibian

The Caucasian salamander (Mertensiella caucasica) is a species of stream-dwelling salamander in the family Salamandridae. It is a salamander of medium size, with a thin, elongated body. The Caucasian salamander is a relict species, endemic to the south-western Caucasus, in Georgia and Turkey. The subspecies M. c. janashvilii is found at Mt. Mtirala near Batumi and probably along the Black Sea coast.

== Habitat, behavior and diet ==
The Caucasian salamander lives along the banks of mountain brooks and small rivers with fast currents, both in the forest belt and above timberline, up to about 2400 m above sea level. The species is secretive and strictly nocturnal, and mates on land. The male uses the protuberance on the upper side of the tail for opening the female's cloaca and passes the spermatophore directly to the female. Their diets consist of invertebrates living in soil or shallow water; an important part of the diet is amphipods.

== Reproduction ==
Sexual dimorphism is expressed by presence of a horn-like protuberance at the upper side of the male's tail, a characteristic recorded only in this species and Luschan's salamander; for this reason, these two species were, for a long time, unified in the same genus, Mertensiella. The two species have also been compared in terms of their anatomical similarities with the Caucasian salamander having a smaller skull and a short scapula. It additionally has a short median suture on its puboischium compared to Luschan's salamander. Mating happens in the summer. the female deposits 10–25 large eggs (0.5 mm in diameter) in hidden places in shallow water or in moist places near brooks. The larvae hatch in one to two months and hibernate one to three times before metamorphosis.

== Evolution ==
In spite of external similarity with Luschan's salamander (protuberance on the tail), molecular data suggest the closest relative of M. caucasica is the gold-striped salamander (Chioglossa lusitanica) from the north-western Iberian Peninsula. Separation from the sister taxon happened about 15 million years ago. A palaeontological species M. caucasica was found from the lower Pliocene of the Polish Carpathians, the fact suggesting a broader distribution of the species before the Ice Age. Within the current range of the species, two evolutionary lineages are fully separated since the Pliocene: one from the Black Sea Basin, and another from Borjomi Gorge in Central Georgia, in spite of the absence of clear natural boundaries between these two areas.

== Threats ==
The salamander has few important natural enemies. The most important factor affecting it is habitat loss, caused by extensive logging in Georgia and construction works in Turkey. Large parts of the habitat of the salamander are not covered by any kind of protected areas.

== Subspecies ==
- M. c. caucasica (Waga, 1876)
- M. c. djanaschvilii (Tartarachvili and Bakradze, 1989)
