= Tylototriton pseudoverrucosus =

Scientific classification
- Kingdom: Animalia
- Phylum: Chordata
- Class: Amphibia
- Order: Urodela
- Family: Salamandridae
- Genus: Tylototriton
- Species: T. pseudoverrucosus

Binomial name
- Tylototriton pseudoverrucosus Hou, Zhang, Jiang, Li & Lu, 2012

Species of salamander

Tylototriton pseudoverrucosus is a species of salamander in the family Salamandridae. It is known only from the Daliang Mountains of Ningnan County, southern Sichuan, China.
