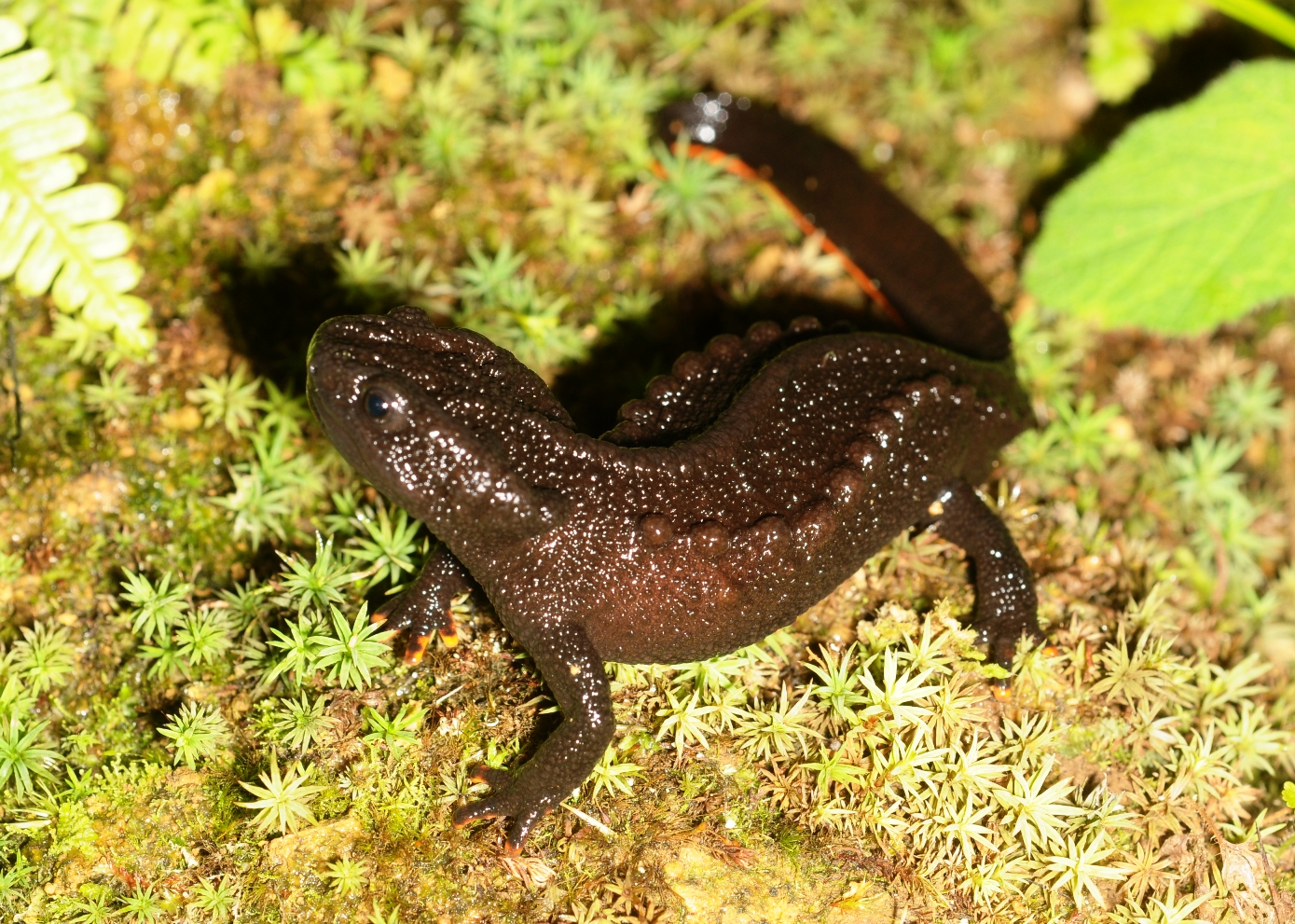
- female

Conservation status
- Vulnerable (IUCN 3.1)

Scientific classification
- Kingdom: Animalia
- Phylum: Chordata
- Class: Amphibia
- Order: Urodela
- Family: Salamandridae
- Genus: Tylototriton
- Species: T. ziegleri

Binomial name
- Tylototriton ziegleri Nishikawa, Matsui, and Nguyen, 2013

Synonyms
- Yaotriton ziegleri (Nishikawa, Matsui, and Nguyen, 2013)

= Tylototriton ziegleri =

Species of amphibian

Tylototriton ziegleri, also known as Ziegler's crocodile newt or Ziegler's knobby newt, is a species of newt in the family Salamandridae. It is currently known from Hà Giang and Cao Bằng provinces in northern Vietnam, although its actual range probably wider; there is a photograph to suggest it also occurs in Lào Cai Province in Vietnam, and its range likely extends to Yunnan in southern China. Based on molecular genetic data, Tylototriton ziegleri belongs to the "Tylototriton asperrimus group" of newts. The specific name ziegleri honours Thomas Ziegler, a German herpetologist.

== Description ==
The single known female is 71 mm (2.8 in) in snout–vent length (SVL); males are 54–68 mm (2.1–2.7 in) SVL. The head is wider than it is long and hexagonal in shape. The head has prominent dorsolateral bony ridges and a prominent but short middorsal ridge. The snout is short and truncate. The body is moderately stout and has prominent, segmented vertebral ridge as well as rows of distinct rib nodules, forming knob-like warts. The tail is laterally compressed and has a pointed tip; the tail length is about the same as SVL. The hands and feet are free of webbing. The dorsum is uniformly black; the venter is slightly lighter than the dorsum. The rib nodules, finger and toe tips, parts of soles and palms, anterior end of vent, and ventral ridge of tail are typically bright orange, with some individual variation in the orange markings.

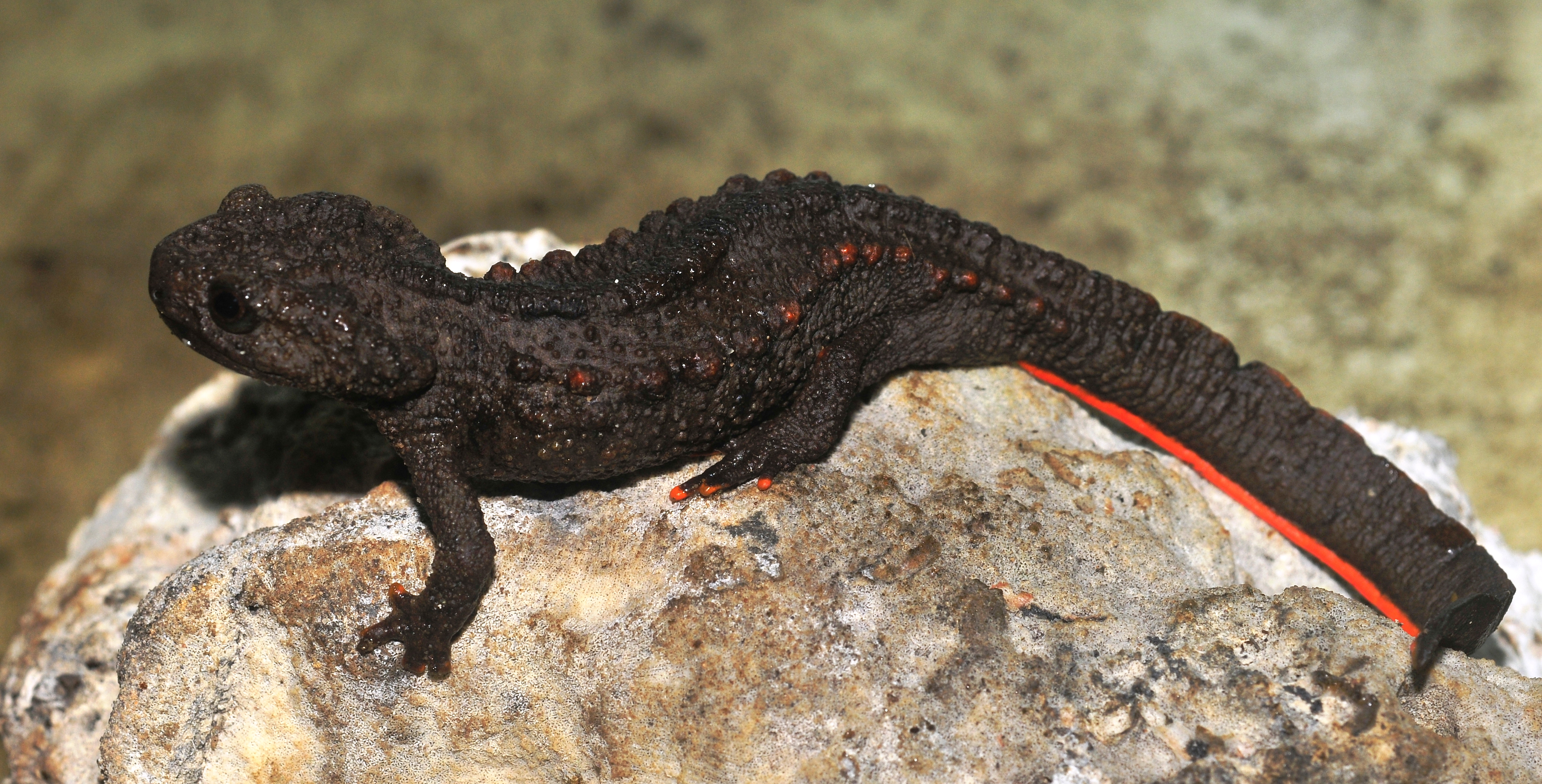
Tylototriton ziegleri male

== Habitat and conservation ==
Tylototriton ziegleri are known from bamboo-dominated subtropical evergreen forests at elevations of 885–1,357 m (2,904–4,452 ft) above sea level. Adults are largely terrestrial and hidden in refugia on the forest floor. The eggs clutches are laid on the ground near ponds in April–May. After hatching, the larvae crawl to the pond during rainy weather. Larvae do not overwinter but metamorphose after July.

Tylototriton ziegleri is threatened by the degradation and loss of suitable habitat and breeding sites. It might also suffer from collection for the pet trade and traditional medicines. One of the known populations resides in the Pia Oac Nature Reserve. Its likely range overlaps with some other protected areas.
