= Laos warty newt =

Conservation status
- Endangered (IUCN 3.1)
- CITES Appendix II

Scientific classification
- Kingdom: Animalia
- Phylum: Chordata
- Class: Amphibia
- Order: Urodela
- Family: Salamandridae
- Subfamily: Pleurodelinae
- Genus: Laotriton; Dubois and Raffaëlli, 2009
- Species: L. laoensis

Binomial name
- Laotriton laoensis (Stuart and Papenfuss, 2002)

Synonyms
- Paramesotriton laoensis Stuart & Papenfuss, 2002

Species of salamander

The Laos warty newt (Laotriton laoensis) is a species of salamander in the family Salamandridae. It is found only in the Saysomboun Special Zone and Phou Kout District in Xiangkhouang Province, Laos. It is classified as endangered by the IUCN due to its restricted geographic range and ongoing habitat loss.

== Description ==
The Laos warty newt is a relatively large newt species for this region, typically measuring between 15–20 centimetres (5.9–7.9 in) in length and weighing approximately 20–35 grams (0.71–1.23 oz).

== Diet ==
This salamander's diet consists of mainly small invertebrates found both on land and in aquatic environments. Common prey can include insects, worms, larvae, small snails, freshwater shrimp, and mosquito larvae.

== Conservation status ==
Sometimes this newt is classified as Paramesotriton laoensis. Since 1999, the population of this newt in the wild has been decimated by wildlife trading networks. The Laos warty newt is considered endangered due to its limited distribution and ongoing degradation of its natural habitat. Its rarity and environmental requirements make it particularly vulnerable to environmental changes, including deforestation and habitat disturbance.
