= Archaeotriton =

Archaeotriton Temporal range: Chattian, ~19.5 Ma

Scientific classification
- Kingdom: Animalia
- Phylum: Chordata
- Class: Amphibia
- Order: Urodela
- Family: Salamandridae
- Genus: †Archaeotriton von Meyer, 1859

Type species
- †Archaeotriton basalticus Meyer, 1859

Extinct genus of amphibians

Archaeotriton is an extinct genus of salamanders belonging to the family Salamandridae. It lived around 19.5 million years ago during the Oligocene epoch in the region of Central Europe in places such as Czech, Bohemia and Saxony. The is currently only identified species in the genus, A. basalticus.

The holotype was uncovered in Varnsdorf and is now lost.

== See also ==
- List of prehistoric amphibians
