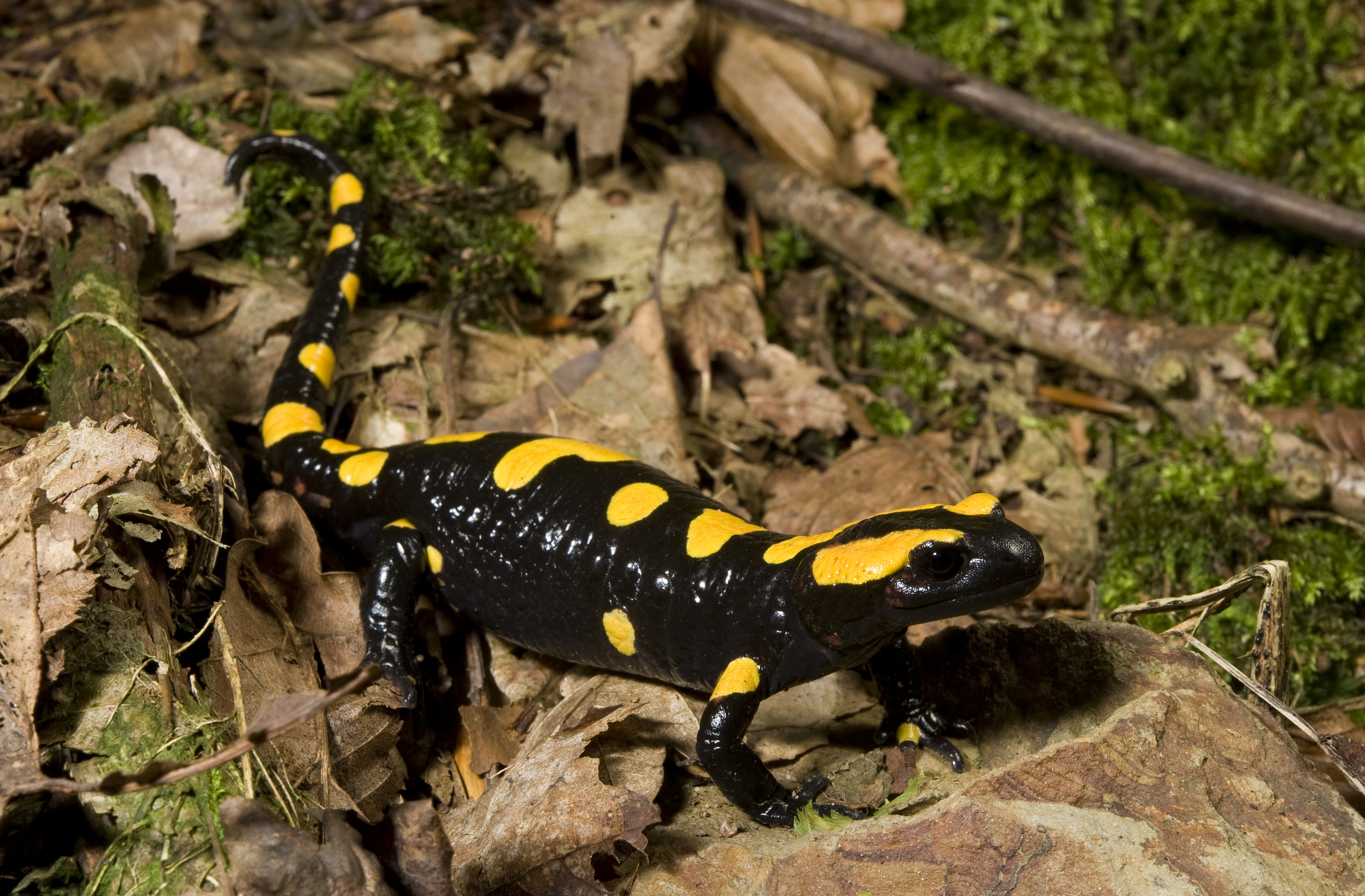

Scientific classification
- Kingdom: Animalia
- Phylum: Chordata
- Class: Amphibia
- Order: Urodela
- Family: Salamandridae
- Genus: Salamandra
- Species: S. longirostris

Binomial name
- Salamandra longirostris Joger and Steinfartz, 1994
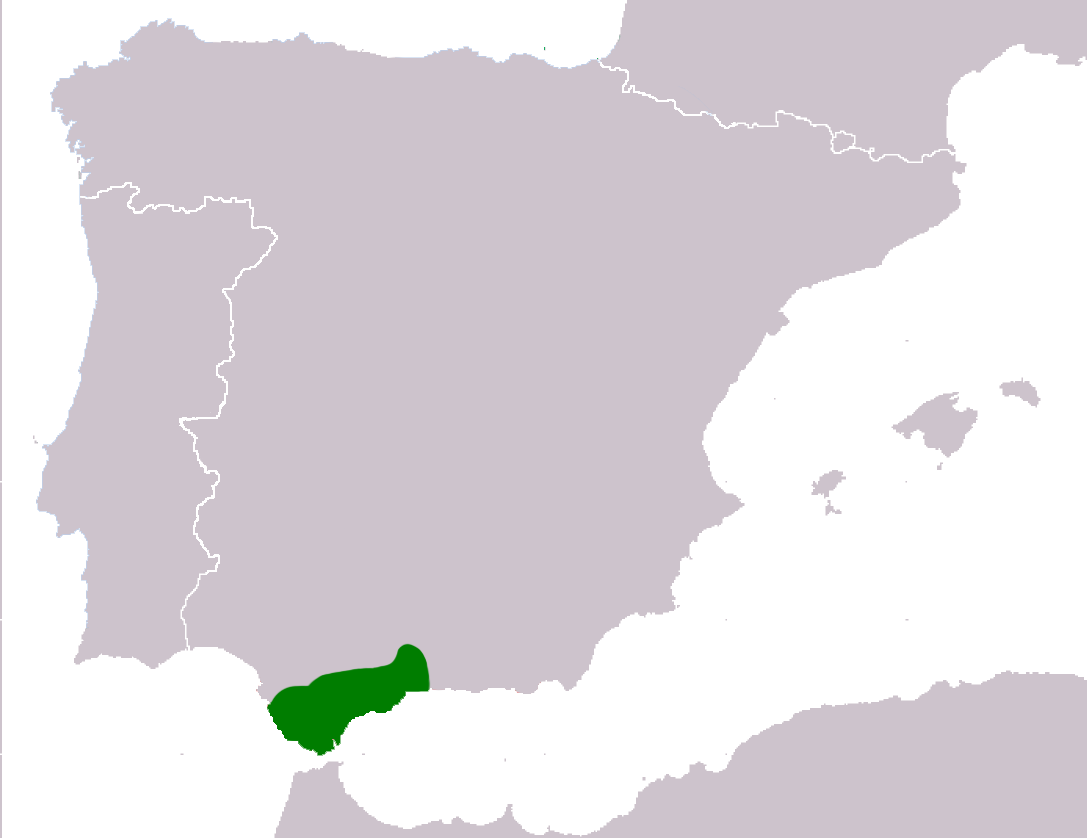
- Distribution of the Penibetic salamander

Synonyms
- Salamandra salamandra longirostris Joger and Steinfartz, 1994

= Salamandra longirostris =

Species of amphibian

Salamandra longirostris, the Penibetic salamander or long-snouted salamander, is a species of urodelan amphibian of the family Salamandridae. It is endemic to the Penibetic mountain range in Andalusia, Spain. It was originally described as a subspecies of Salamandra salamandra, the fire salamander, then raised to full species rank in 2009.

It is a large salamander, very similar to the fire salamander which lives elsewhere. The body and head are black with quadrangular yellow spots, from where poison is secreted. The snout is pointed and the belly greyish, without spots.

It lives in humid areas, with watercourses nearby, where it reproduces.
