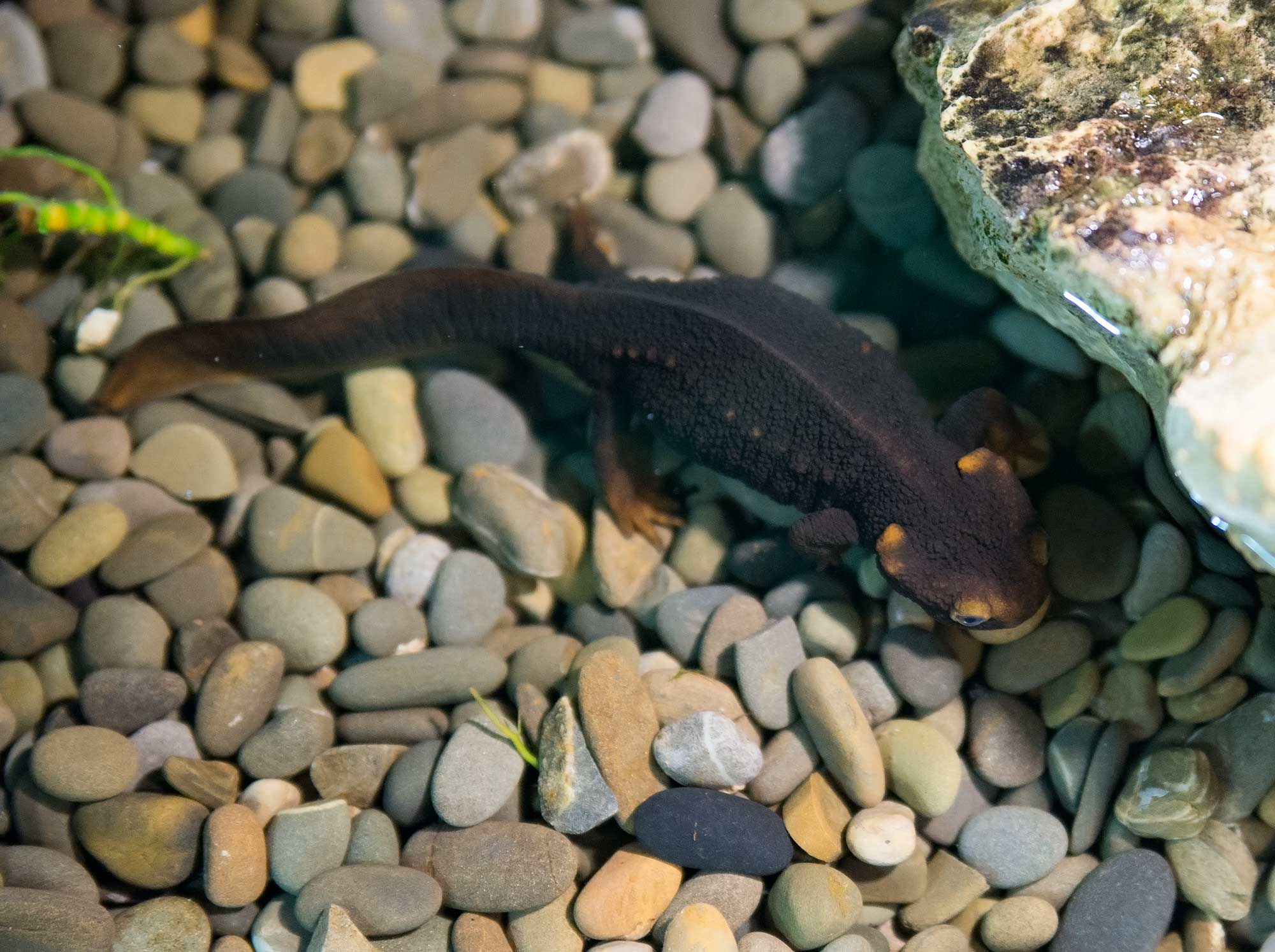

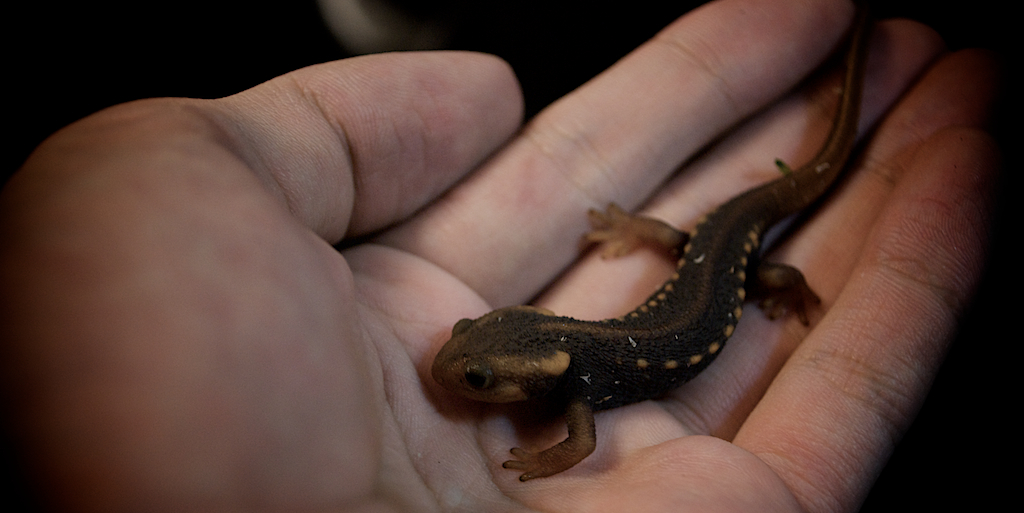
- Tylototriton verrucosus in a person's hand showing its size

Conservation status
- Near Threatened (IUCN 3.1)

Scientific classification
- Kingdom: Animalia
- Phylum: Chordata
- Class: Amphibia
- Order: Urodela
- Family: Salamandridae
- Genus: Tylototriton
- Species: T. verrucosus

Binomial name
- Tylototriton verrucosus Anderson, 1871

= Tylototriton verrucosus =

Species of amphibian

Tylototriton verrucosus is a species of newt found in the Indian subcontinent and Southeast Asia. Common names include: Himalayan newt, crocodile newt, crocodile salamander, Himalayan salamander, red knobby newt.

== Description ==
This newt can reach a length of 20 cm (7.9 in). The tongue is small and is free on the sides and only slightly towards its base. The teeth on the palate are in two oblique rows that meet at the front of the mouth. The skull has a thick, bony fronto-squamosal arch, a feature of all salamanders. They have five toes and the tail is flattened to aid swimming.

The head is wide and the snout is short and the head has three prominent bony ridges with pores, one along the center and two along the back of the sides of the heads (the parietal ridge). There are no lobes on the lips. The body is 3 to 3.5 times as long as the head. There is no crest running along the dorsal midrib as in some newts but there is a prominent vertebral ridge with a series of knobs formed from the expansion of the neural processes of the dorsal vertebral bones. There is a series of 15 or 16 knob-like porous glands along the sides with the last three behind the leg. The legs are moderately long with the fingers and toes within webbing but are slightly flattened. The tail is at least as long as the head and body and is flattened to help in swimming. The tail has an upper and lower crest which meet at the tip of the tail. The anal opening is a longitudinal slit, and its borders are not raised. The skin is rough and the parotoid glands are large. There is a strong fold on the chin. The entire newt is uniformly blackish brown, slightly paler on the lips, snout, chin, throat, and under surface of limbs. The lower edge of the tail is orange-yellow.

During the breeding season in May and June these behavioural differences between the sexes. Courtship and mating occur at night and as in many salamanders involves the male moving around it while bending, pushing and curving its tail.

=== Diet ===
They feed on spiders, worms, millipedes, scorpions, molluscs and a range of insects.

== Range ==
T. verrucosus is found in mountains of Yunnan, Kakhyen Hills, Sikkim, Manipur and Northern Burma. Preservation efforts are on in its habitat in Darjeeling (India), where it breeds in good numbers. In Thailand, it is only known from Doi Chang in Chiang Rai Province. Other populations in Northern and Northeastern Thailand, as well as populations in Laos and Vietnam, were described in 2013 and 2015 as the new species T. anguliceps, T. panhai and T. uyenoi.
