= Tiannan crocodile newt =

Scientific classification
- Kingdom: Animalia
- Phylum: Chordata
- Class: Amphibia
- Order: Urodela
- Family: Salamandridae
- Genus: Tylototriton
- Species: T. yangi

Binomial name
- Tylototriton yangi Hou, Zhang, Zhou, Li, and Lu, 2012

Species of salamander

Tylototriton yangi is a species of salamander in the family Salamandridae endemic to southern Yunnan, China. It is found throughout Honghe and Wenshan Prefectures.
