= Taliang knobby newt =

Conservation status
- Vulnerable (IUCN 3.1)

Scientific classification
- Kingdom: Animalia
- Phylum: Chordata
- Class: Amphibia
- Order: Urodela
- Family: Salamandridae
- Genus: Tylototriton
- Species: T. taliangensis

Binomial name
- Tylototriton taliangensis Liu, 1950

Species of salamander

The Taliang knobby newt (Tylototriton taliangensis) is a species of salamander in the family Salamandridae. It is found only in southern Sichuan, China. It inhabits densely vegetated forested valleys, where it breeds in pools, ponds and paddy fields. It is a common species within its confined range.
