= Tylototriton panhai =

Scientific classification
- Kingdom: Animalia
- Phylum: Chordata
- Class: Amphibia
- Order: Urodela
- Family: Salamandridae
- Genus: Tylototriton
- Species: T. panhai

Binomial name
- Tylototriton panhai Nishikawa et al., 2013

Species of amphibian

Tylototriton panhai is a newt found in Thailand and Laos. It was recently distinguished from Tylototriton shanjing (emperor newt) by Nishikawa et al., 2013.

The specific name, panhai, is in honour of Somsak Panha of Department of Biology, Chulalongkorn University for his dedication to the study of small new living organisms in the world for a long time, mostly discovered in Thailand.

== Distribution ==
Tylototriton panhai is found in:

- Phu Hin Rong Kla National Park, Phitsanulok Province, Thailand
- Phu Luang Wildlife Sanctuary and Phu Suan Sai National Park, Loei Province, Thailand
- Sayaboury Province, Laos
