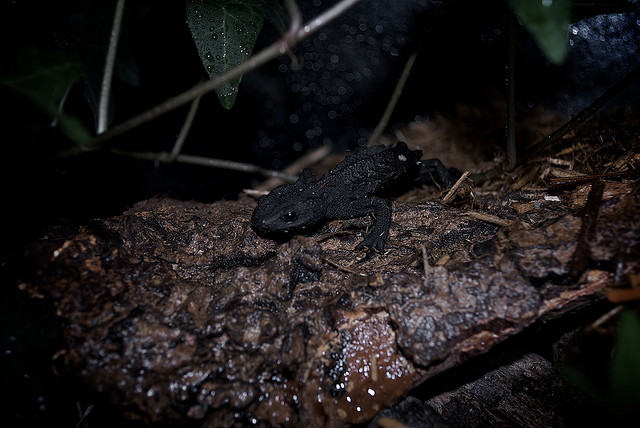

Conservation status
- Vulnerable (IUCN 3.1)

Scientific classification
- Kingdom: Animalia
- Phylum: Chordata
- Class: Amphibia
- Order: Urodela
- Family: Salamandridae
- Genus: Tylototriton
- Species: T. wenxianensis

Binomial name
- Tylototriton wenxianensis Fei, Ye, and Yang, 1984

Synonyms
- Tylototriton asperrimus wenxianensis Fei, Ye, and Yang, 1984; Yaotriton wenxianensis (Fei, Ye, and Yang, 1984)

= Wenxian knobby newt =

Species of salamander

The Wenxian knobby newt or Wenxian knobby salamander (Tylototriton wenxianensis) is a species of salamander in the family Salamandridae. It is endemic to central China (southern Gansu and adjacent northern Sichuan, isolated records from Guizhou, Hunan, Jiangxi, and Anhui provinces). Its type locality is Wen County in Gansu, or in Chinese: 文县; pinyin: Wénxiàn, hence the name.

== Description ==
Tylototriton wenxianensis is a medium-sized representative of Tylototriton. It is dorsally entirely black, and ventrally brownish black. Tips of digits and lower tail margin are orange Skin is rough. Head is flat and oval. Tail is laterally compressed and shorter than snout–vent length.

== Habitat and conservation ==
Tylototriton wenxianensis inhabits forests near streams and pools in hilly areas, hiding under rocks. Eggs are laid on land or between water and land; the larvae develop in water.

It is threatened by habitat loss and degradation due to farming and subsistence wood collection.
