= Hainan knobby newt =

Conservation status
- Endangered (IUCN 3.1)

Scientific classification
- Kingdom: Animalia
- Phylum: Chordata
- Class: Amphibia
- Order: Urodela
- Family: Salamandridae
- Genus: Tylototriton
- Species: T. hainanensis

Binomial name
- Tylototriton hainanensis Fei, Ye & Yang, 1984

Species of salamander

The Hainan knobby newt (Tylototriton hainanensis) is a species of salamander in the family Salamandridae. It is found only in the island of Hainan, China. It is known from the Wuzhi Mountains, Diaoluoshan, and Jianfengling. All these locations are nature reserves. Nevertheless, the species is threatened by habitat loss and degradation due to agriculture, clear-cutting and infrastructure development for tourist activities.

Hainan knobby newts live under dead leaves or root holes in heavily shaded forest in the mountains. Breeding season is in May. Their total length is 125–148 mm (4.9–5.8 in), males being larger than females.
