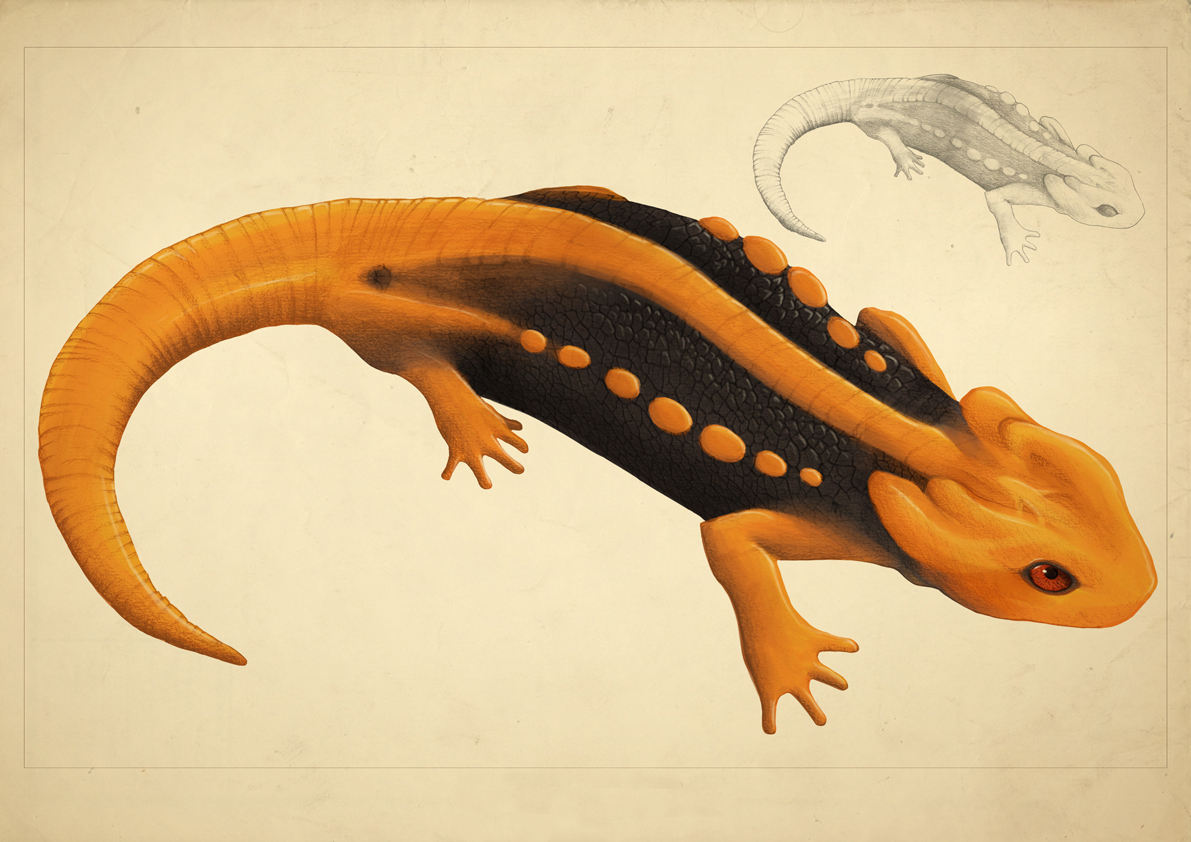

Conservation status
- Least Concern (IUCN 3.1)

Scientific classification
- Kingdom: Animalia
- Phylum: Chordata
- Class: Amphibia
- Order: Urodela
- Family: Salamandridae
- Genus: Tylototriton
- Species: T. anguliceps

Binomial name
- Tylototriton anguliceps Le, Nguyen, Nishikawa, Nguyen, Pham, Matsui, Bernardes & Nguyen, 2015

= Tylototriton anguliceps =

Species of salamander

The angular-headed newt (Tylototriton anguliceps), also known as angular-headed crocodile newt, is a species of salamander in the family Salamandridae from Thailand, Laos, and Vietnam. Its unique orange markings help to distinguish it from other species, and also gave it the nickname "Star-Trek newt" or "Klingon newt", as it resembles the ridges on the head of the fictional Klingon species from the television show Star Trek.

== Distribution ==
The range of Tylototriton anguliceps

The angular-headed newt can be found inhabiting three different countries: Vietnam, Laos, and Thailand. It was initially discovered in Mường Nhé District and Thuận Châu District in Vietnam and Doi Lahnga, a mountain in the Chiang Mai Province in Thailand, in 2015. While there have yet to be any findings in other countries, there is speculation that the salamander may also inhabit southern China and western Myanmar. It is one of only four known species in the Tylototriton genus to inhabit Laos.

== Habitat and ecology ==
The Tylototriton genus is mainly found in Asian countries, centered in Thailand, Vietnam, and Lao. Tylototriton anguliceps is centrally located in western Vietnam and northeastern Thailand. All of these locations have in common that they are high in elevation ranging from about 1,300- 1,800m, some even higher. Tylototriton anguliceps seems to prefer tropical and subtropical moist forest as it is mostly found in under these conditions in their perspective countries. Specifically, they are often localized in forest of broad leaves, also known as a forest which is dominated by evergreen vegetation. When Tylototriton anguliceps have been spotted, they mostly have under rocks, rotting wood, and even in water areas after rainfall. A forest land type would be humid and dense, with a lot of green plant life and moss growth being predominant. Secondly, a wetland habitat, including rivers, streams, and creeks are suitable for the sustainment of the species. This species depends entirely on a forest land type. These habitats are high in rainfall all year long, being the most ideal conditions for Tylototriton anguliceps.

== Morphology ==
Adults have a dark-brown to black color, with bright orange heads, limbs, tails, and markings, as well as prominent dorsal and dorsolateral ridges on the head, distinguishing the species from other species. They have four fingers and five toes that all lack webbing. Males tend to be smaller than females, but have more robust limbs. The snout length is larger as well in females, ranging from 65.4mm - 74.1mm in females, and 61.1 - 62.5 in males.

== Gallery ==
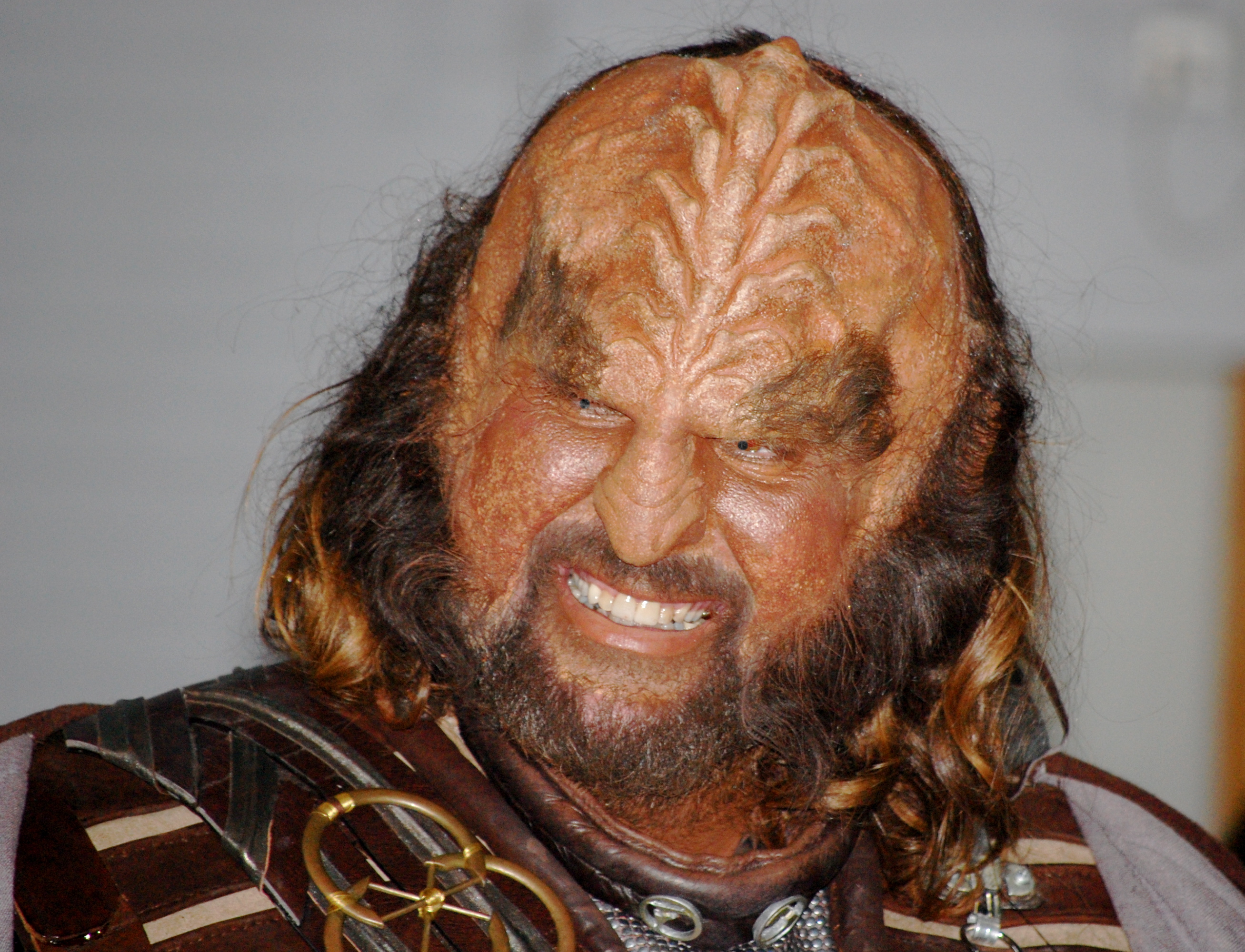
Klingon, a species from Star Trek

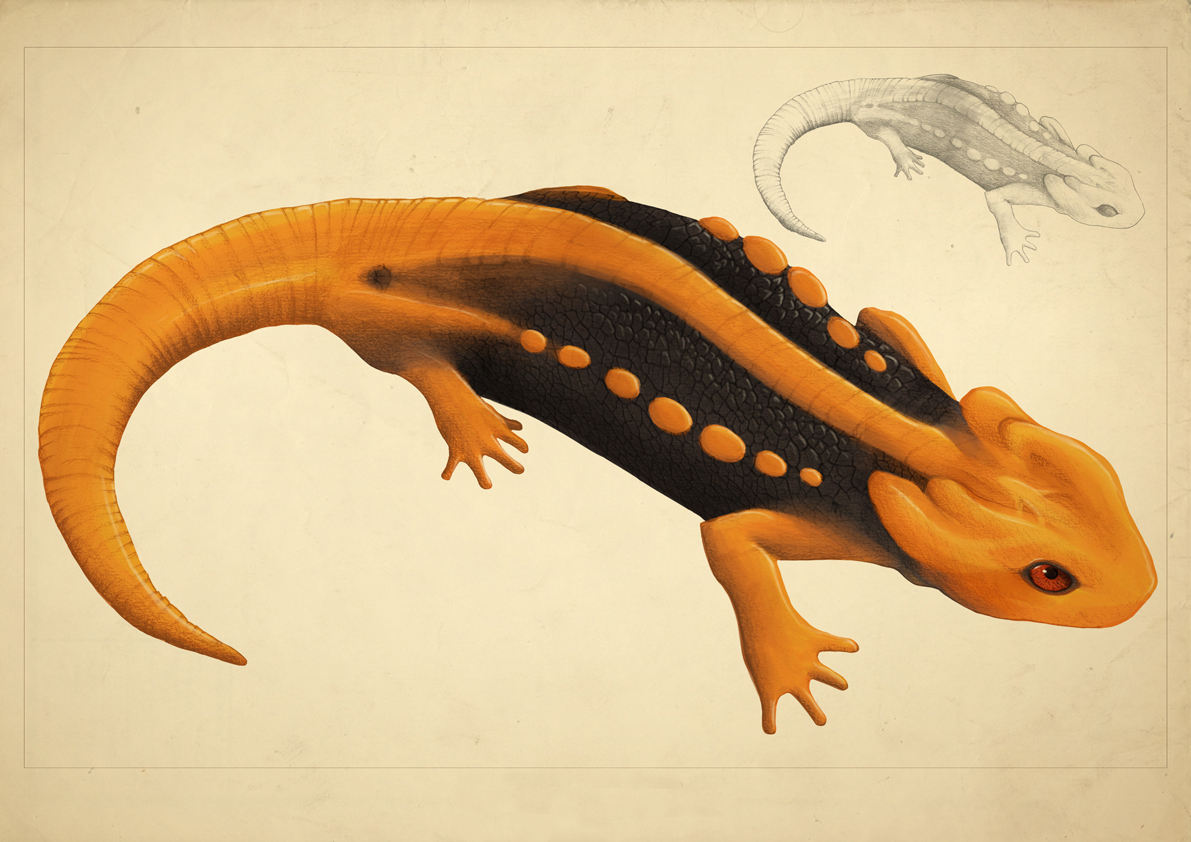
Illustration of T. anguliceps
