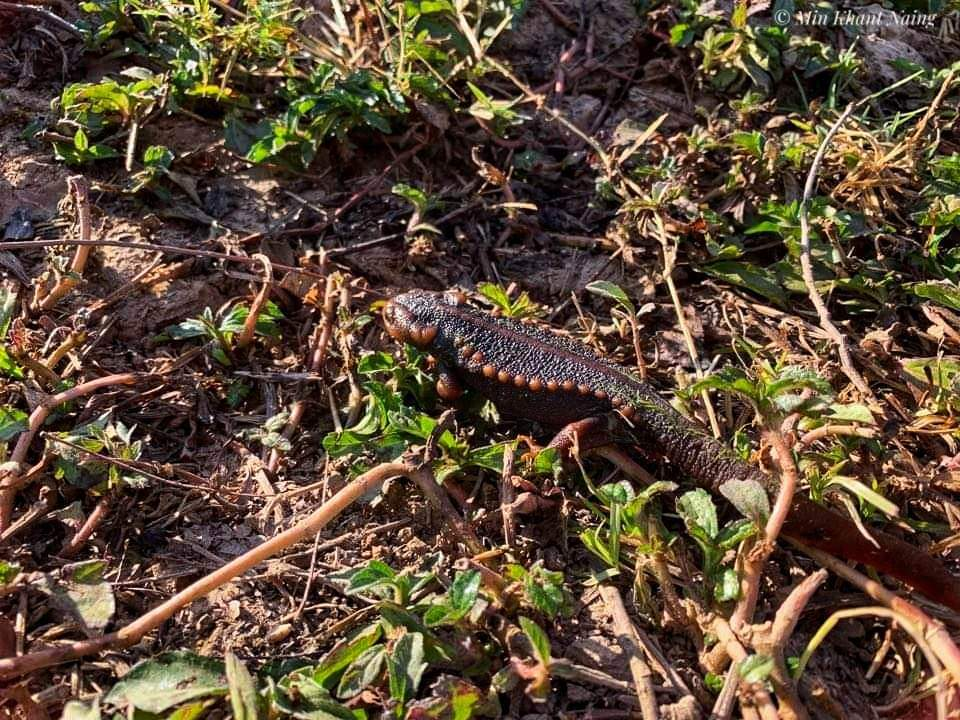

Conservation status
- Vulnerable (IUCN 3.1)

Scientific classification
- Kingdom: Animalia
- Phylum: Chordata
- Class: Amphibia
- Order: Urodela
- Family: Salamandridae
- Genus: Tylototriton
- Species: T. shanorum

Binomial name
- Tylototriton shanorum Nishikawa, Matsui, & Rao, 2014

Synonyms
- Tylototriton ngarsuensis Grismer et al., 2018

= Tylototriton shanorum =

Species of amphibian

Tylototriton shanorum is a newt endemic to Shan State, Myanmar, where it was recorded in Taunggyi.
