= Tylototriton uyenoi =

Scientific classification
- Kingdom: Animalia
- Phylum: Chordata
- Class: Amphibia
- Order: Urodela
- Family: Salamandridae
- Genus: Tylototriton
- Species: T. uyenoi

Binomial name
- Tylototriton uyenoi Nishikawa, Khonsue, Pomchote, and Matsui, 2013

Species of amphibian

Tylototriton uyenoi, the Chiang Mai crocodile newt, is a newt endemic to Chiang Mai Province, Thailand. It was distinguished from Tylototriton shanjing, the emperor newt, in 2013. The species was named in honor of herpetologist Shun-ichi Ueno. T. uyenoi is one of the few salamander species endemic to Thailand.

== Description ==
Tylototriton uyenoi bears a prominent ridge on its back, flanked by two rows of raised bumps; the head bears parallel ridges. These features are coloured orange, while the rest of the body is brownish black. Juveniles appear to be somewhat more highly coloured. Individuals reach an average length of 75–79 mm.

== Distribution ==
The species occurs only in Chiang Mai Province, where it has been recorded in Chiang Dao Wildlife Sanctuary and Doi Inthanon National Park.

== Ecology ==
The species appears to be a generalist predator, feeding on a variety of arthropods and snails. Breeding has been reported from May to July.
