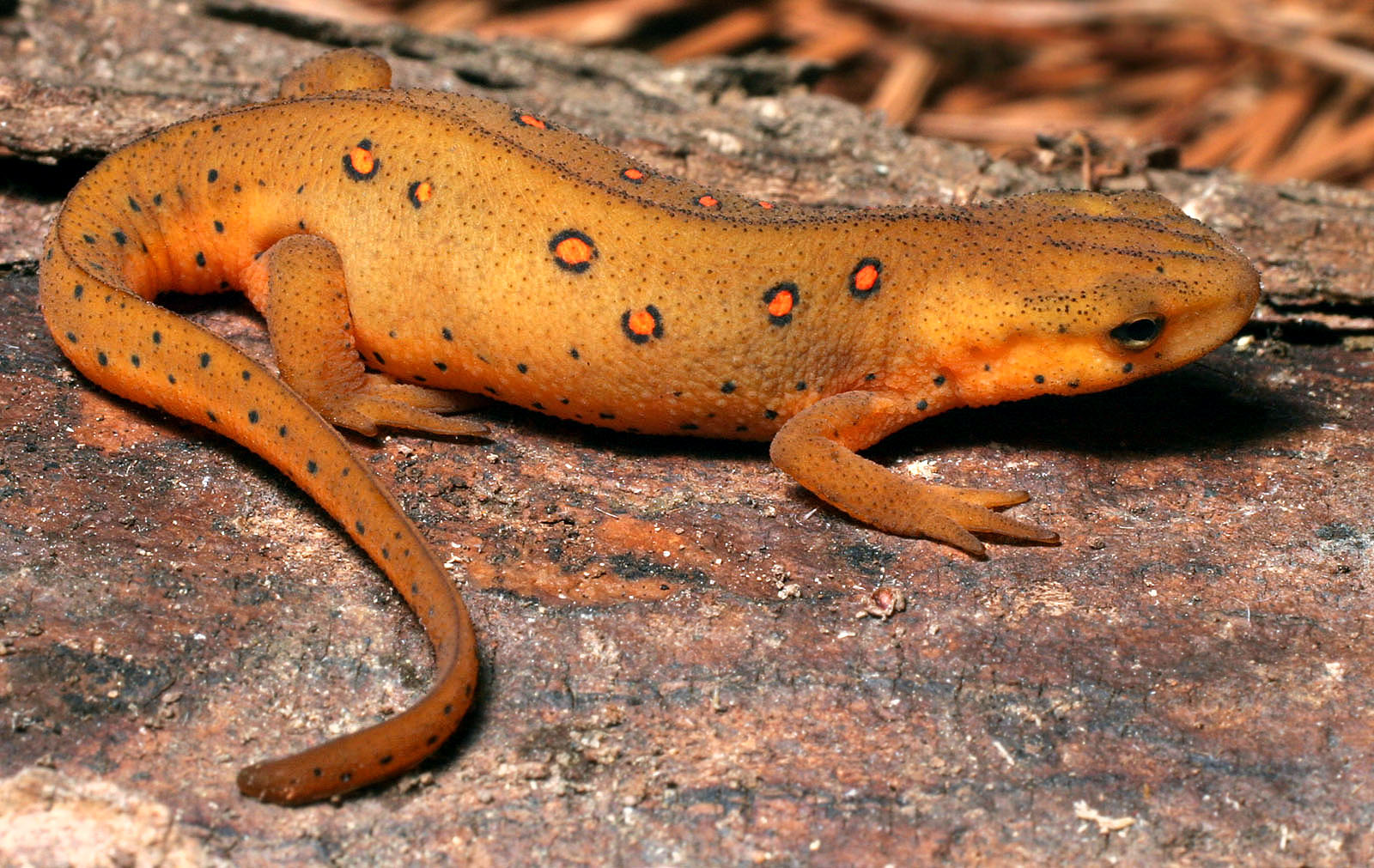
- Notophthalmus viridescens from North America

Scientific classification
- Kingdom: Animalia
- Phylum: Chordata
- Class: Amphibia
- Order: Urodela
- Suborder: Salamandroidea
- Family: Salamandridae; Goldfuss, 1820

Genera
- Calotriton; Chioglossa; Cynops; Echinotriton; Euproctus; Ichthyosaura; Laotriton; Lissotriton; Lyciasalamandra; Mertensiella; Neurergus; Notophthalmus; Ommatotriton; Pachytriton; Paramesotriton; Pleurodeles; Salamandra; Salamandrina; Taricha; Triturus; Tylototriton

= Salamandridae =

Salamandridae True salamanders and newts Temporal range: 89–0 Ma Cretaceous–recent

Family of salamanders

Salamandridae is a family of salamanders consisting of true salamanders and newts. Salamandrids are distinguished from other salamanders by the lack of rib or costal grooves along the sides of their bodies and by their rough skin. Their skin is very granular because of the number of poison glands. They also lack nasolabial grooves. Most species of Salamandridae have moveable eyelids but lack lacrimal glands.

Nearly all salamandrids produce a potent toxin in their skin, with some species being deadly to many other animal species. With a few exceptions, salamandrids have patterns of bright and contrasting colours, most of these are to warn potential predators of their toxicity. They have four well-developed limbs, with four toes on the fore limbs, and (in most cases) five toes on the hind limbs. They vary from 7 to 30 cm (3 to 12 in) in length.

Many species within this family reproduce by method of internal fertilization. Additionally, there are many species-specific courtship rituals that males perform to attract mates. These courtship rituals often employ pheromones to induce mating behavior in females. Pheromones have been discovered to be the driving force behind female mating responses in Alpine newts. These pheromones can induce behavior even when male visual epigamic characters and courtship dances are absent. All species within the genus Lyciasalamandra are viviparous, meaning they give birth to live young, without a tadpole stage. There are some species within the genus Salamandra are known to be viviparous too. Some newts are neotenic, being able to reproduce before they are fully metamorphosed. The females of many species can store sperm for up to 6 months at a time.

== Toxicity ==
The genus Taricha use the poison tetrodotoxin (TTX) that binds and blocks voltage-gated sodium channels (Na_{v}) in nerves and muscles. This blockage causes the cessation of action potentials, leading to paralysis and death. The rough-skinned newt (Taricha granulosa) uses tetrodotoxin and is considered the most poisonous species of newt. There are species and sub-species of Taricha that live in concurrent regions with a garter snake (Thamnophis) that has developed a resistance to the TTX poisoning. Species that inhabit regions with resistant Thamnophis snakes have evolved to increase their concentrations of TTX in an evolutionary arms race of predator versus prey.

== Conservation status (IUCN Redlist) ==
Conservation Status of Salamandridae
IUCN Classification	Number of Species
Least Concern	32
Near Threatened	12
Vulnerable	16
Endangered	14
Critically Endangered	3
Lack of Data	1

== Phylogeny ==
Cladograms based on the work of Pyron and Wiens (2011) and modified using Mikko Haaramo

- - Salamandrininae
    - †Archaeotriton basalticus
    - Salamandrina
  - - Salamandrinae
      - Chioglossini
        - Mertensiella caucasica
        - Chioglossa lusitanica
      - Salamandrini
        - †Megalotriton filholi
        - Lyciasalamandra
        - Salamandra
    - Pleurodelinae
      - †Carpathotriton
      - Pleurodelini
        - †Brachycormus noachicus
        - †Chelotriton
        - †Palaeopleurodeles hauffi
        - Pleurodeles
        - - Echinotriton
          - Tylototriton
      - Molgini
        - Tarichina
          - Notophthalmus
          - Taricha
        - Molgina
          - †Koalliella genzeli
          - †Oligosemia spinosa
          - Lissotriton
          - - - - Neurergus
                - Ommatotriton
              - - Calotriton
                - Triturus
            - - Euproctus
              - - Ichthyosaura alpestris
                - Cynopita
                  - †Procynops miocenicus
                  - Laotriton laoensis
                  - - Pachytriton
                    - - Cynops
                      - Paramesotriton

== Taxonomy ==
The genus Salamandrina is the only member of the subfamily Salamandrininae, and the genera Chioglossa, Lyciasalamandra, Mertensiella, and Salamandra are grouped in the subfamily Salamandrinae, with sixteen other genera comprising the subfamily Pleurodelinae. Those with a more thoroughly aquatic lifestyle are referred to as "newts", but this is not a formal taxonomic description.

Family SALAMANDRIDAE

- Subfamily Pleurodelinae
  - Genus Calotriton - two species
    - Calotriton arnoldi Carranza & Amat, 2005
    - Calotriton asper (Dugès, 1852)
  - Genus Cynops (fire belly newts) - ten species
    - Cynops chenggongensis Kou and Xing, 1983
    - Cynops cyanurus Liu, Hu, and Yang, 1962
    - Cynops ensicauda (Hallowell, 1861)
    - Cynops fudingensis Wu, Wang, Jiang, and Hanken, 2010
    - Cynops glaucus Yuan, Jiang, Ding, Zhang, and Che, 2013
    - Cynops orientalis (David, 1873)
    - Cynops orphicus Risch, 1983
    - Cynops pyrrhogaster (Boie, 1826)
    - Cynops wolterstorffi (Boulenger, 1905)
    - Cynops yunnanensis Yang, 1983
  - Genus Echinotriton - three species
    - Echinotriton andersoni (Boulenger, 1892)
    - Echinotriton chinhaiensis (Chang, 1932)
    - Echinotriton maxiquadratus Hou, Wu, Yang, Zheng, Yuan, and Li, 2014
  - Genus Euproctus - two species
    - Euproctus montanus (Savi, 1838)
    - Euproctus platycephalus (Gravenhorst, 1829)
  - Genus Ichthyosaura - one species
    - Ichthyosaura alpestris (Laurenti, 1768)
  - Genus Laotriton - one species
    - Laotriton laoensis (Stuart & Papenfuss, 2002)
  - Genus Lissotriton - ten species
    - Lissotriton boscai (Lataste, 1879)
    - Lissotriton graecus (Wolterstorff, 1906)
    - Lissotriton helveticus (Razoumovsky, 1789)
    - Lissotriton italicus (Peracca, 1898)
    - Lissotriton kosswigi (Freytag, 1955)
    - Lissotriton lantzi (Wolterstorff, 1914)
    - Lissotriton maltzani (Boettger, 1879)
    - Lissotriton montandoni (Boulenger, 1880)
    - Lissotriton schmidtleri (Raxworthy, 1988)
    - Lissotriton vulgaris (Linnaeus, 1758)
  - Genus Neurergus - five species
    - Neurergus barani Öz, 1994
    - Neurergus crocatus Cope, 1862
    - Neurergus derjugini (Nesterov, 1916)
    - Neurergus kaiseri Schmidt, 1952
    - Neurergus strauchii (Steindachner, 1887)
  - Genus Notophthalmus - three species
    - Notophthalmus meridionalis (Cope, 1880)
    - Notophthalmus perstriatus (Bishop, 1941)
    - Notophthalmus viridescens (Rafinesque, 1820)
  - Genus Ommatotriton - three species
    - Ommatotriton nesterovi (Litvinchuk, Zuiderwijk, Borkin, and Rosanov, 2005)
    - Ommatotriton ophryticus (Berthold, 1846)
    - Ommatotriton vittatus (Gray, 1835)
  - Genus Pachytriton - ten species
    - Pachytriton airobranchiatus Li, Yuan, Li, and Wu, 2018
    - Pachytriton archospotus Shen, Shen, and Mo, 2008
    - Pachytriton brevipes (Sauvage, 1876)
    - Pachytriton changi Nishikawa, Matsui, and Jiang, 2012
    - Pachytriton feii Nishikawa, Jiang, and Matsui, 2011
    - Pachytriton granulosus Chang, 1933
    - Pachytriton inexpectatus Nishikawa, Jiang, Matsui, and Mo, 2011
    - Pachytriton moi Nishikawa, Jiang, and Matsui, 2011
    - Pachytriton wuguanfui Yuan, Zhang, and Che, 2016
    - Pachytriton xanthospilos Wu, Wang, and Hanken, 2012
  - Genus Paramesotriton - fourteen species
    - Paramesotriton aurantius Yuan, Wu, Zhou, and Che, 2016
    - Paramesotriton caudopunctatus (Liu and Hu, 1973)
    - Paramesotriton chinensis (Gray, 1859)
    - Paramesotriton deloustali (Bourret, 1934)
    - Paramesotriton fuzhongensis Wen, 1989
    - Paramesotriton guangxiensis (Huang, Tang, and Tang, 1983)
    - Paramesotriton hongkongensis (Myers and Leviton, 1962)
    - Paramesotriton labiatus (Unterstein, 1930)
    - Paramesotriton longliensis Li, Tian, Gu, and Xiong, 2008
    - Paramesotriton maolanensis Gu, Chen, Tian, Li, and Ran, 2012
    - Paramesotriton qixilingensis Yan, Zhao, Jiang, Hou, He, Murphy, and Che, 2014
    - Paramesotriton wulingensis Wang, Tian, and Gu, 2013
    - Paramesotriton yunwuensis Wu, Jiang, and Hanken, 2010
    - Paramesotriton zhijinensis Li, Tian, and Gu, 2008
  - Genus Pleurodeles - three species
    - Pleurodeles nebulosus (Guichenot, 1850)
    - Pleurodeles poireti (Gervais, 1836)
    - Pleurodeles waltl Michahelles, 1830
  - Genus Taricha - four species
    - Taricha granulosa (Skilton, 1849)
    - Taricha rivularis (Twitty, 1935)
    - Taricha sierrae (Twitty, 1942)
    - Taricha torosa (Rathke, 1833)
  - Genus Triturus (crested newts) - nine species
    - Triturus anatolicus Wielstra & Arntzen, 2016
    - Triturus carnifex (Laurenti, 1768)
    - Triturus cristatus (Laurenti, 1768)
    - Triturus dobrogicus (Kiritzescu, 1768)
    - Triturus ivanbureschi Arntzen & Wielstra, 2013
    - Triturus karelinii (Strauch, 1870)
    - Triturus macedonicus (Karaman, 1922)
    - Triturus marmoratus (Latreille, 1800)
    - Triturus pygmaeus (Wolterstorff, 1905)
  - Genus Tylototriton (crocodile newts) - twenty-five species
    - Tylototriton anguliceps Le, Nguyen, Nishikawa, Nguyen, Pham, Matsui, Bernardes, and Nguyen, 2015
    - Tylototriton anhuiensis Qian, Sun, Li, Guo, Pan, Kang, Wang, Jiang, Wu, and Zhang, 2017
    - Tylototriton asperrimus Unterstein, 1930
    - Tylototriton broadoridgus Shen, Jiang, and Mo, 2012
    - Tylototriton dabienicus Chen, Wang, and Tao, 2010
    - Tylototriton hainanensis Fei, Ye, and Yang, 1984
    - Tylototriton himalayanus Khatiwada, Wang, Ghimire, Vasudevan, Paudel, and Jiang, 2015
    - Tylototriton kachinorum Zaw, Lay, Pawangkhanant, Gorin, and Poyarkov, 2019
    - Tylototriton kweichowensis Fang and Chang, 1932
    - Tylototriton liuyangensis Yang, Jiang, Shen, and Fei, 2014
    - Tylototriton lizhengchangi Hou, Zhang, Jiang, Li and Lu, 2012
    - Tylototriton ngarsuensis Grismer, Wood, Quah, Thura, Espinoza, Grismer, Murdoch, and Lin, 2018
    - Tylototriton notialis Stuart, Phimmachak, Sivongxay, and Robichaud, 2010
    - Tylototriton panhai Nishikawa, Khonsue, Pomchote, and Matsui, 2013
    - Tylototriton podichthys Phimmachak, Aowphol, and Stuart, 2015
    - Tylototriton pseudoverrucosus Hou, Gu, Zhang, Zeng, and Lu, 2012
    - Tylototriton shanjing Nussbaum, Brodie, and Yang, 1995
    - Tylototriton shanorum Nishikawa, Matsui, and Rao, 2014
    - Tylototriton taliangensis Liu, 1950
    - Tylototriton uyenoi Nishikawa, Khonsue, Pomchote, and Matsui, 2013
    - Tylototriton verrucosus Anderson, 1871
    - Tylototriton vietnamensis Böhme, Schöttler, Nguyen, and Köhler, 2005
    - Tylototriton wenxianensis Fei, Ye, and Yang, 1984
    - Tylototriton yangi Hou, Zhang, Zhou, Li, and Lu, 2012
    - Tylototriton ziegleri Nishikawa, Matsui, and Nguyen, 2013
- Subfamily Salamandrinae
  - Genus Chioglossa - one species
    - Chioglossa lusitanica Bocage, 1864
  - Genus Lyciasalamandra - seven species
    - Lyciasalamandra antalyana (Başoğlu and Baran, 1976)
    - Lyciasalamandra atifi (Başoğlu, 1967)
    - Lyciasalamandra billae (Franzen and Klewen, 1987)
    - Lyciasalamandra fazilae (Başoğlu and Atatür, 1975 "1974")
    - Lyciasalamandra flavimembris (Mutz and Steinfartz, 1995)
    - Lyciasalamandra helverseni (Pieper, 1963)
    - Lyciasalamandra luschani (Steindachner, 1891)
  - Genus Mertensiella - one species
    - Mertensiella caucasica (Waga, 1876)
  - Genus Salamandra (fire salamanders) - seven species
    - Salamandra algira Bedriaga, 1883
    - Salamandra atra Laurenti, 1768
    - Salamandra corsica Savi, 1838
    - Salamandra infraimmaculata Martens, 1885
    - Salamandra lanzai Nascetti, Andreone, Capula, and Bullini, 1988
    - Salamandra longirostris Joger and Steinfartz, 1994
    - Salamandra salamandra (Linnaeus, 1758)
- Subfamily Salamandrininae
  - Genus Salamandrina- two species
    - Salamandrina perspicillata (Savi, 1821)
    - Salamandrina terdigitata (Bonnaterre, 1789)

== Fossil record ==
Salamandrids have a substantial fossil record spanning most of the Cenozoic. The oldest known fossils date from the Campanian (Late Cretaceous), but these, and most other known fossil salamandrids apparently belong to the crown group. The sole known stem-salamandrid is Phosphotriton sigei, from the Quercy Phosphorites Formation, which apparently dates from the Middle to Late Eocene.
