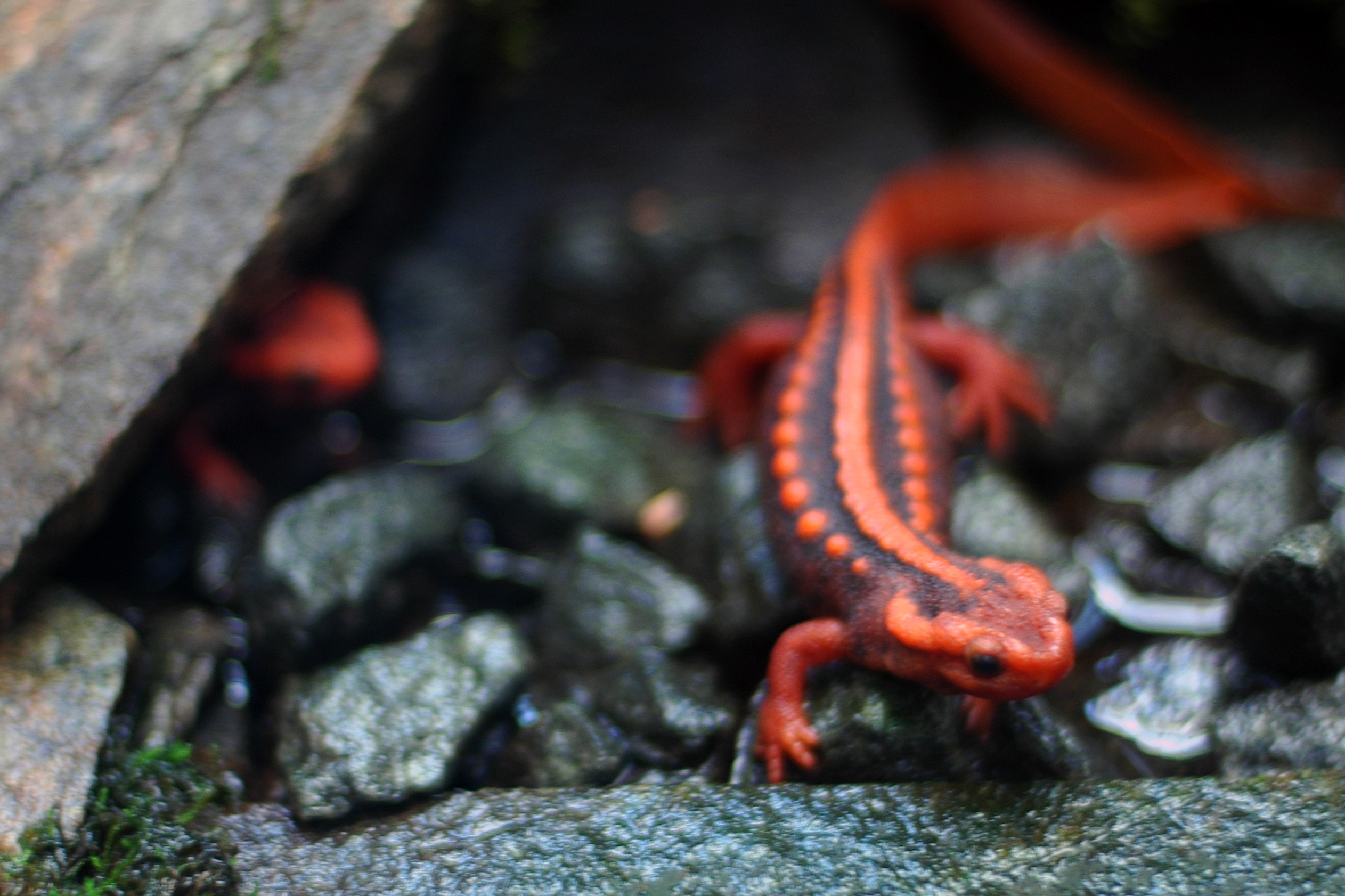
- Tylototriton shanjing
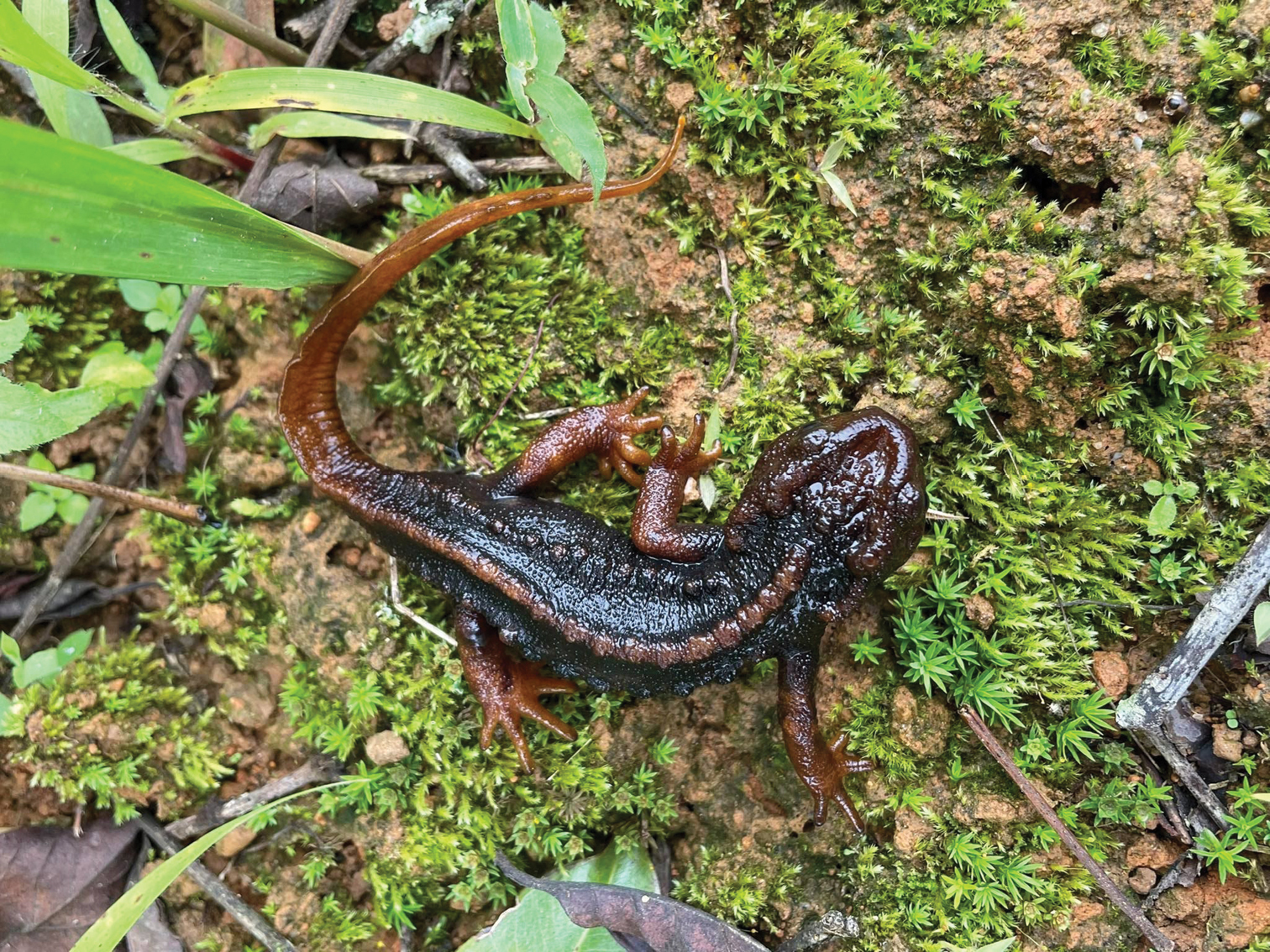
- Tylototriton umphangensis

Scientific classification
- Kingdom: Animalia
- Phylum: Chordata
- Class: Amphibia
- Order: Urodela
- Family: Salamandridae
- Subfamily: Pleurodelinae
- Genus: Tylototriton; Andersson, 1871

Type species
- Tylototriton verrucosus Anderson, 1871

= Tylototriton =

Genus of amphibians

Tylototriton is a genus of newts commonly known as crocodile newts or knobby newts. About 38 known species are in this genus, with many species having been described recently. They range from northeastern India and Nepal through Burma to northern Thailand, Laos, Vietnam, and southern China.

== Species ==
This genus currently contains around 40 described species as of April 2026:

- Tylototriton anguliceps Le, Nguyen, Nishikawa, Nguyen, Pham, Matsui, Bernardes, and Nguyen, 2015
- Tylototriton anhuiensis Qian, Sun, Li, Guo, Pan, Kang, Wang, Jiang, Wu, and Zhang, 2017
- Tylototriton asperrimus Unterstein, 1930
- Tylototriton broadoridgus Shen, Jiang, and Mo, 2012
- Tylototriton dabienicus Chen, Wang, and Tao, 2010
- Tylototriton daloushanensis Zhou, Xiao, and Luo, 2022
- Tylototriton gaowangjienensis Huang, Xiang, Wu, Zhang, Zhang, Wang, Lan, Huang, Jiang, and Jiang, 2024
- Tylototriton guilinensis Xiao et al., 2026
- Tylototriton hainanensis Fei, Ye, and Yang, 1984
- Tylototriton himalayanus Khatiwada, Wang, Ghimire, Vasudevan, Paudel, and Jiang, 2015
- Tylototriton kachinorum Zaw, Lay, Pawangkhanant, Gorin, and Poyarkov, 2019
- Tylototriton kweichowensis Fang and Chang, 1932
- Tylototriton liuyangensis Yang, Jiang, Shen, and Fei, 2014
- Tylototriton lizhengchangi Hou, Zhang, Jiang, Li and Lu, 2012
- Tylototriton maolanensis Li, Wei, Cheng, Zhang, and Wang, 2020
- Tylototriton ngarsuensis Grismer, Wood, Quah, Thura, Espinoza, Grismer, Murdoch, and Lin, 2018
- Tylototriton ngoclinhensis Phung, Pham, Nguyen, Ninh, Nguyen, Bernardes, Le, Ziegler & Nguyen, 2023
- Tylototriton notialis Stuart, Phimmachak, Sivongxay, and Robichaud, 2010
- Tylototriton panhai Nishikawa, Khonsue, Pomchote, and Matsui, 2013
- Tylototriton panwaensis Grismer, Wood, Quah, Thura, Espinoza, and Murdoch, 2019
- Tylototriton pasmansi Bernardes, Le, Nguyen, Pham, Pham, Nguyen, and Ziegler, 2020
- Tylototriton phukhaensis Pomchote, Khonsue, Thammachoti, Hernandez, Peerachidacho, Suwannapoom, Onishi, and Nishikawa, 2020
- Tylototriton podichthys Phimmachak, Aowphol, and Stuart, 2015
- Tylototriton pseudoverrucosus Hou, Gu, Zhang, Zeng, and Lu, 2012
- Tylototriton pulcherrimus Hou, Zhang, Li, and Lu, 2012
- Tylototriton shanjing Nussbaum, Brodie, and Yang, 1995
- Tylototriton shanorum Nishikawa, Matsui, and Rao, 2014
- Tylototriton sini Lyu, Wang, Zeng, Zhou, Qi, Wan, and Wang, 2021
- Tylototriton sparreboomi Bernardes, Le, Nguyen, Pham, Pham, Nguyen, and Ziegler, 2020
- Tylototriton taliangensis Liu, 1950
- Tylototriton thaiorum Poyarkov, Nguyen, and Arkhipov, 2021
- Tylototriton tongziensis Li, Liu, Shi, Wei, and Wang, 2022
- Tylototriton umphangensis Pomchote, Peerachidacho, Hernandez, Sapewisut, Khonsue, Thammachoti, and Nishikawa, 2021
- Tylototriton uyenoi Nishikawa, Khonsue, Pomchote, and Matsui, 2013
- Tylototriton verrucosus Anderson, 1871
- Tylototriton vietnamensis Böhme, Schöttler, Nguyen, and Köhler, 2005
- Tylototriton vietnamirabilis Ong AV, Phan TQ, Hoang CV, Nguyen MHT, Nguyen TT, Ziegler T, Nguyen TQ, Pham CT, 2026
- Tylototriton wenxianensis Fei, Ye, and Yang, 1984
- Tylototriton wufengensis Li et al., 2026
- Tylototriton yangi Hou, Zhang, Zhou, Li, and Lu, 2012
- Tylototriton zaimeng Decemson, Lalremsanga, Elangbam, Vabeiryureilai, Shinde, Purkayastha, Arkhipov, Bragin & Poyarkov, 2023
- Tylototriton ziegleri Nishikawa, Matsui, and Nguyen, 2013
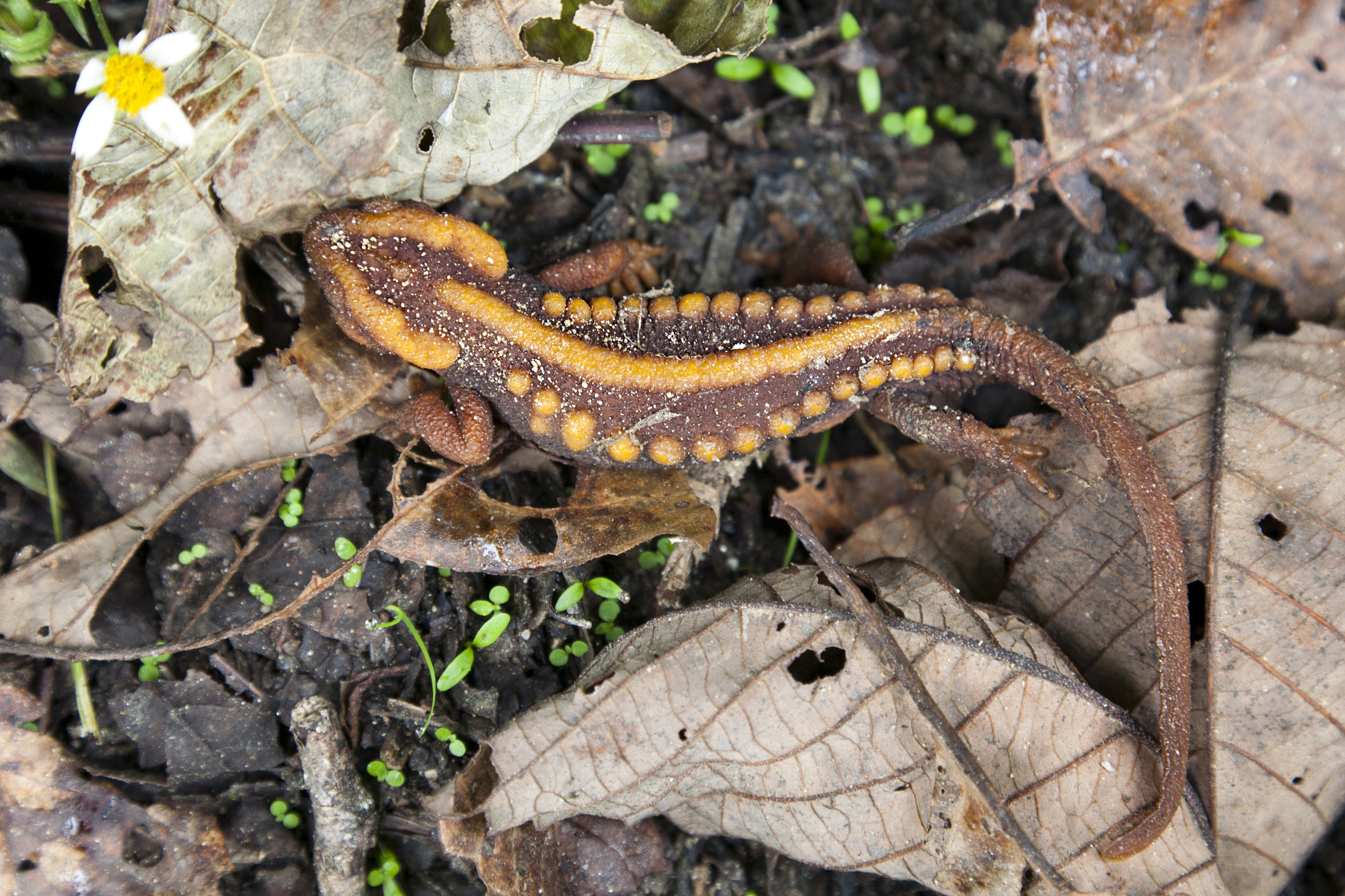
Tylototriton shanjing

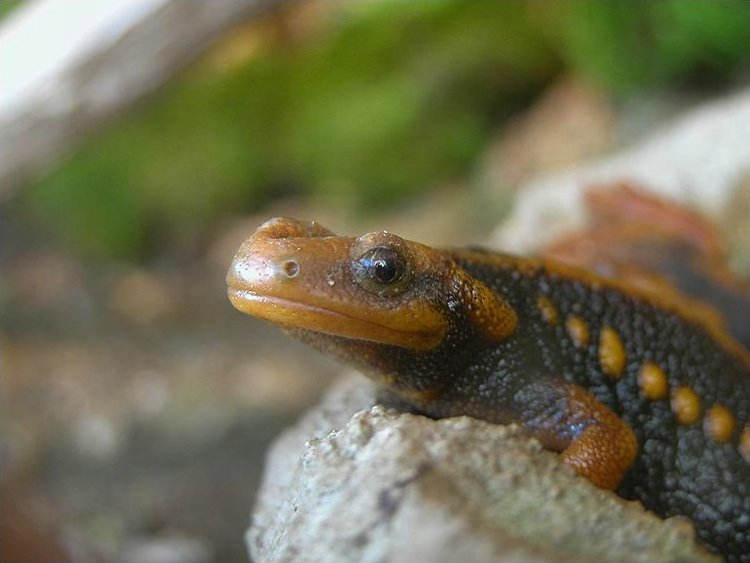
Tylototriton verrucosus

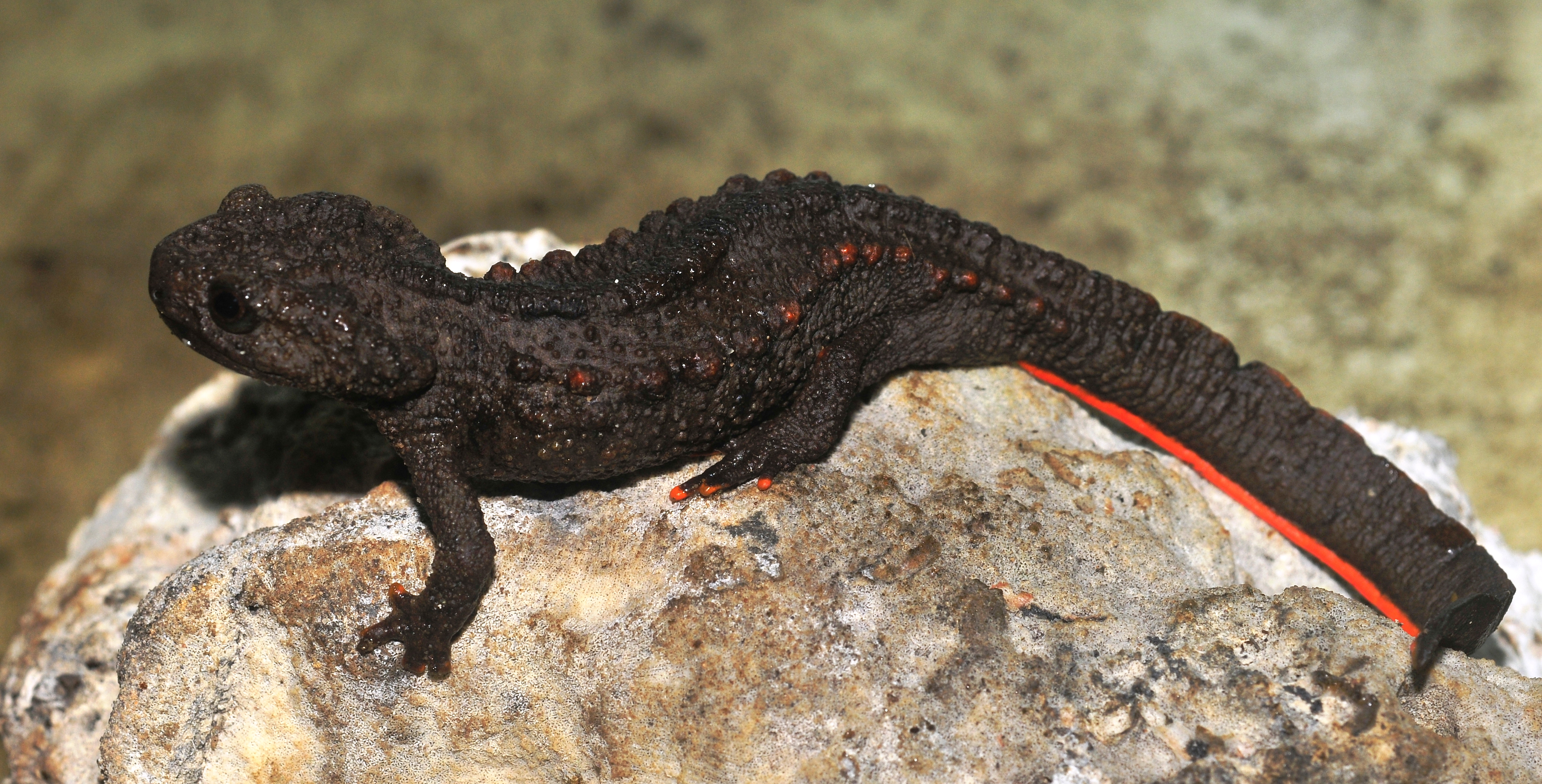
Tylototriton ziegleri

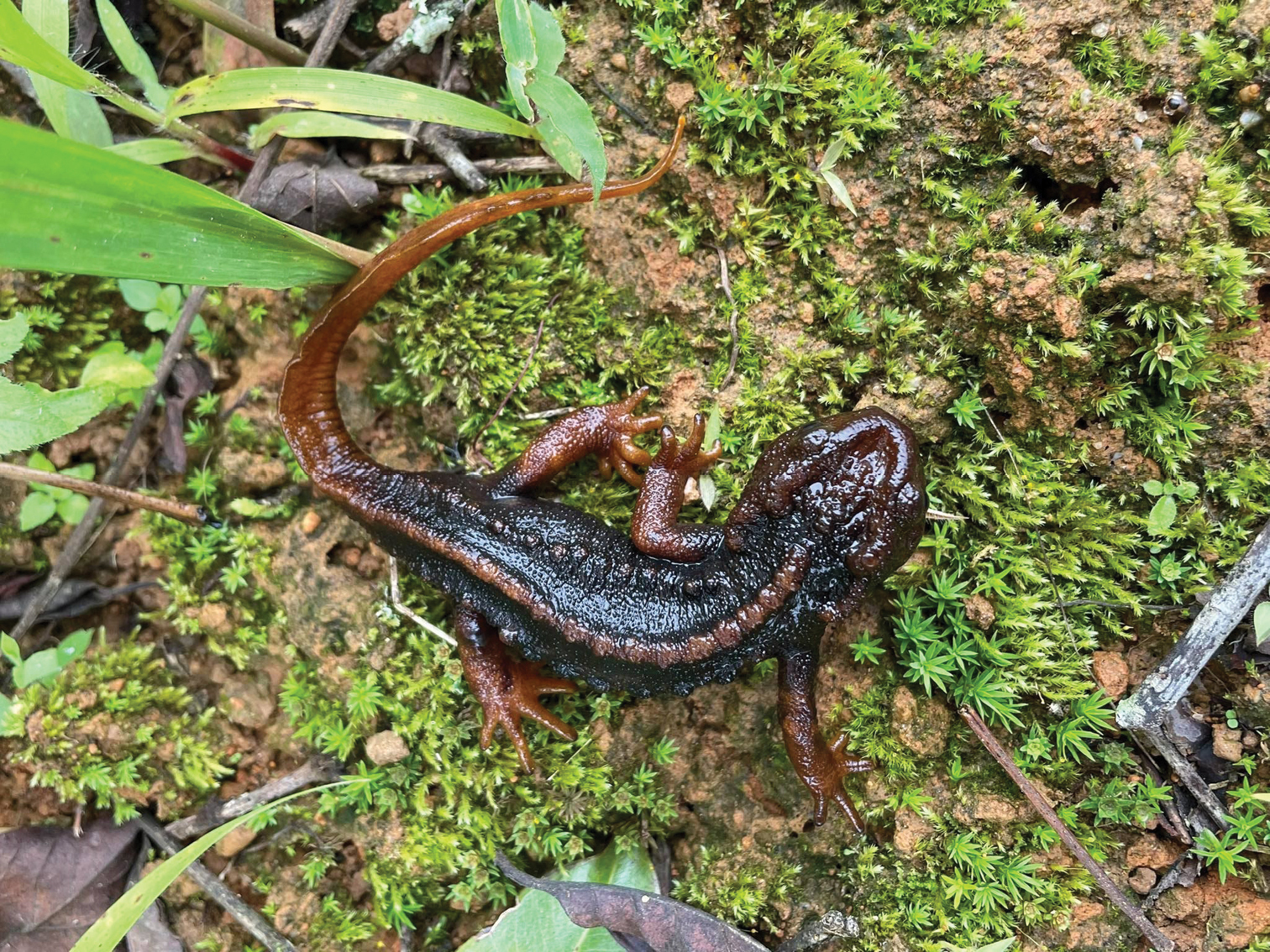
Tylototriton umphangensis

== Phylogeny ==
The following phylogeny of Tylototriton is from Nishikawa, Matsui & Rao (2014).

- Tylototriton
  - Subgenus Yaotriton
    - Tylototriton panhai
    - Tylototriton asperrimus
  - Subgenus Tylototriton
    - Tylototriton taliangensis
    - - Tylototriton kweichowensis
      - - - Tylototriton verrucosus verrucosus (Nepal)
          - Tylototriton verrucosus verrucosus (Myanmar)
        - - Tylototriton yangi
          - Tylototriton uyenoi
          - T. shanjing complex
            - Tylototriton verrucosus pulcherrima
            - - Tylototriton shanjing
              - Tylototriton verrucosus verrucosus
