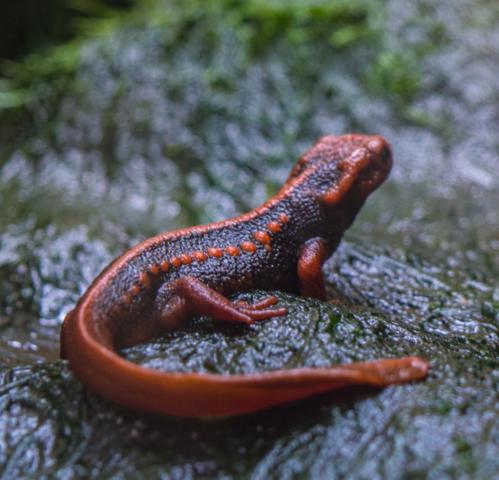

Conservation status
- Vulnerable (IUCN 3.1)

Scientific classification
- Kingdom: Animalia
- Phylum: Chordata
- Class: Amphibia
- Order: Urodela
- Family: Salamandridae
- Genus: Tylototriton
- Species: T. shanjing

Binomial name
- Tylototriton shanjing Nussbaum, Brodie & Yang, 1995

= Tylototriton shanjing =

Species of amphibian

Tylototriton shanjing, the emperor newt, Mandarin newt, or Mandarin salamander, is a highly toxic newt native to Yunnan and parts of South China. It is sometimes seen in private collections and is potentially available for sale at certain reptile and amphibian-specializing pet stores and occasionally through captive breeders.

== Description ==
Tylototriton shanjing can grow up to 8 inches (20 cm) long. It has a ridged orange head with a darker, almost black body, with a single orange ridge running down its back to the tail-tip. This dorsal ridge is paralleled by a row of circular, orange bumps on both sides of the newt's body—these are the poison glands. The tail and legs are the same shade of orange, which can vary based on population, diet, distribution, etc.

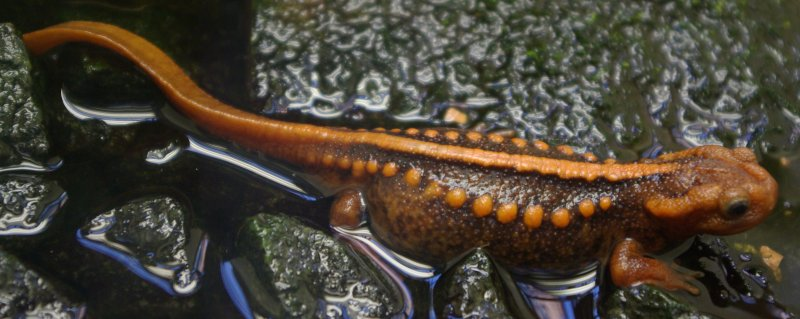

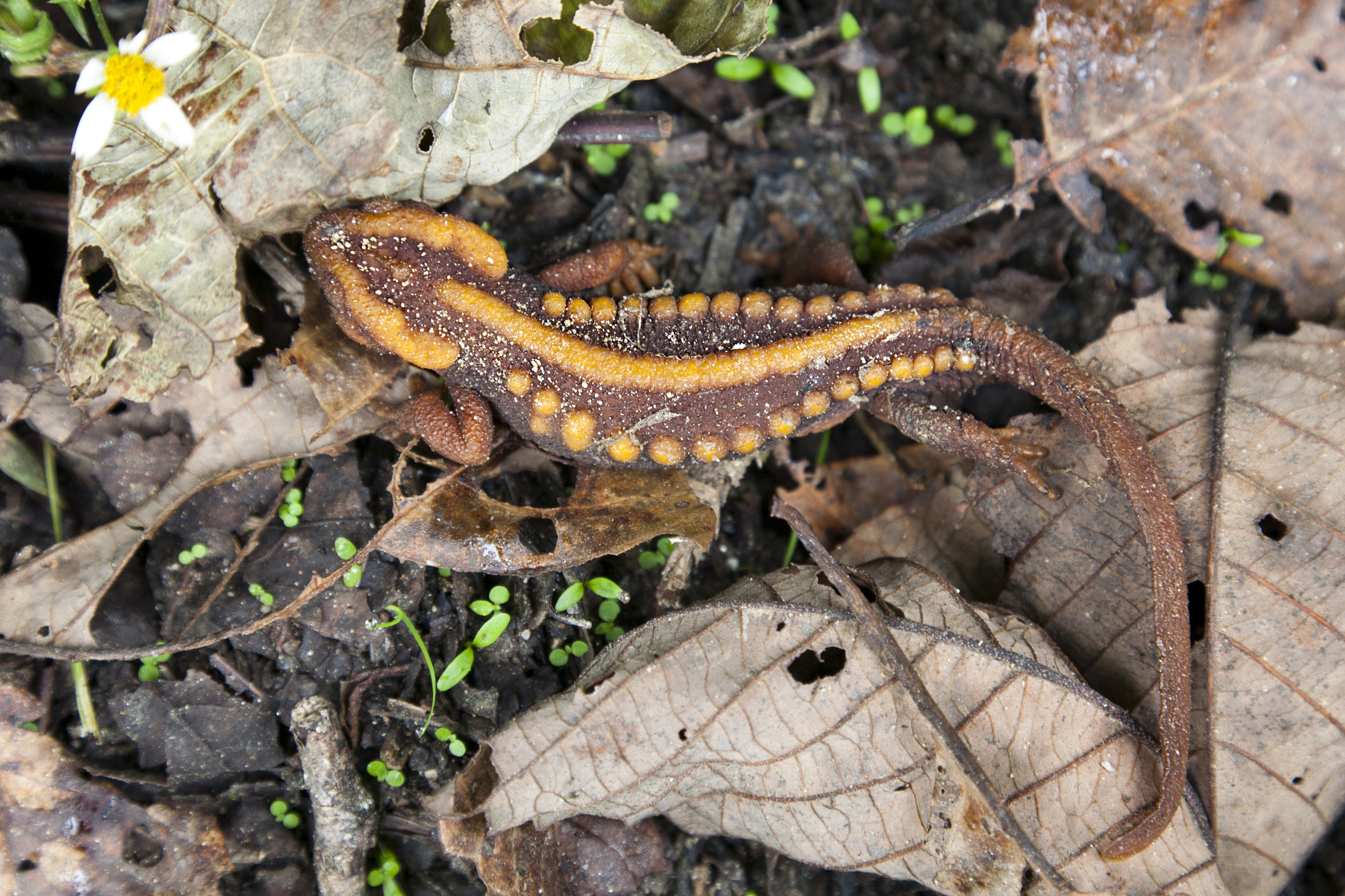

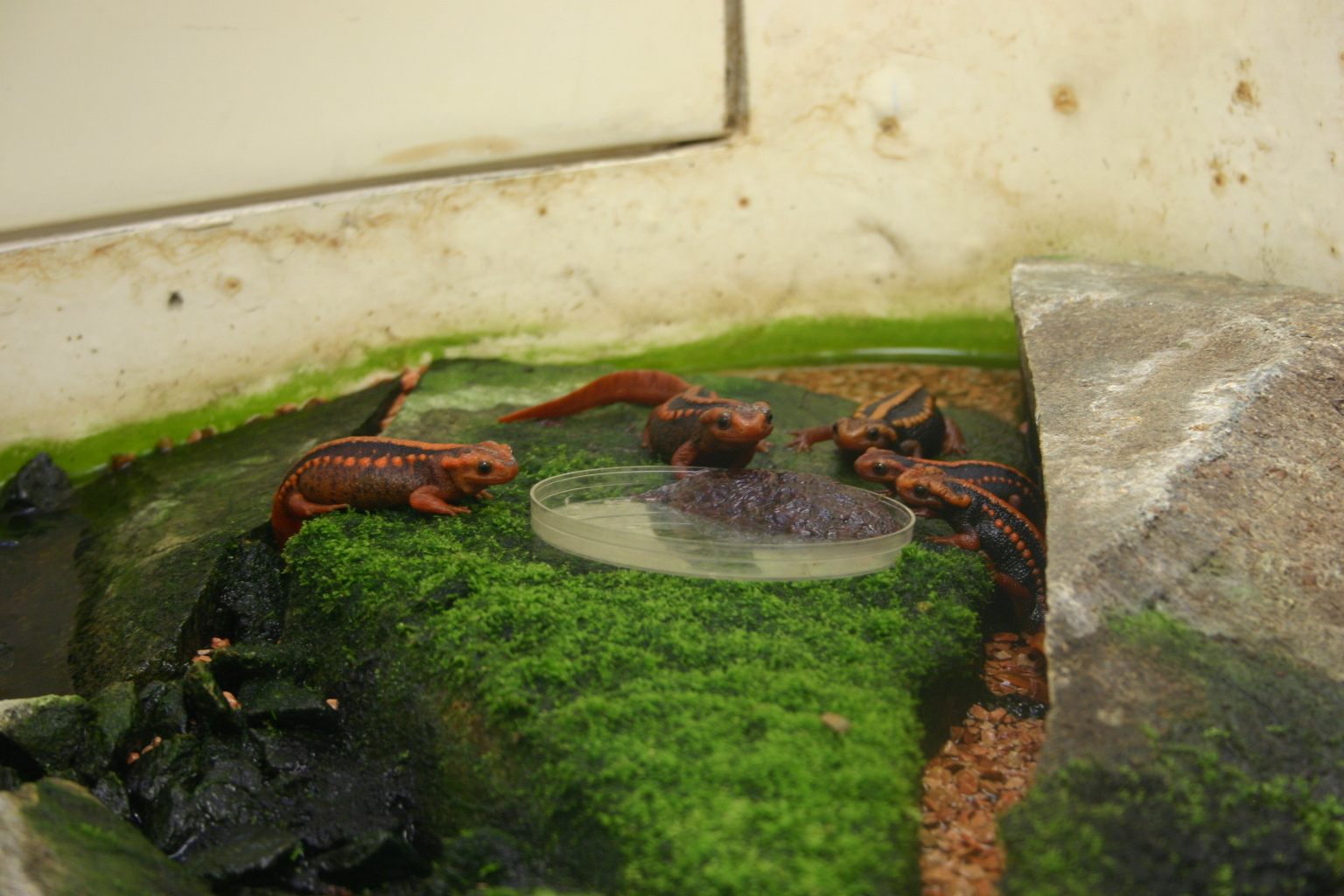

== Defense ==
Tylototriton shanjing might seem like easy prey because of its slow, almost unenthusiastic movements. However, the bright orange coloration it displays is, in nature, generally a warning to potential predators that the animal is poisonous, even lethal, if ingested or bitten into. This vivid color warning-system is prevalent throughout amphibians, reptiles, invertebrates, some fish and plants, as well as in many types of fungi which are toxic if eaten. The newt's orange bumps along its back are its poison glands; when the newt is grabbed, the tips of the ribs will squeeze out poison from these glands. Emperor newts have enough toxin to kill approximately 7,500 mice. Therefore, most larger animals avoid this newt. Additionally, it is generally nocturnal and hard to find. If an animal attempts to bite into it, the top of the newt's vertebrae and skull have especially thick bone. Although poisonous if eaten, or if their toxin is ingested, these newts are generally safe for human handling, provided they are held carefully and gently, and not more often than is absolutely necessary. Non-powdered latex or nitrile gloves should be, ideally, worn by the handler. One's hands should be washed thoroughly before and after handling—even if gloves are worn—not only for sanitary reasons (such as the presence of Salmonella and other pathogens), but for the newt's own health. All amphibians possess highly permeable skin, making it vital to wash and dry one's hands thoroughly before and after handling any amphibian (or reptile), even if gloves or other protective hand wear are used.

== Range and habitat ==
Emperor newts live in central, western, and southern Yunnan, China, between 1,000 and 2,500 metres (3,300 and 8,200 ft) above sea level.

They inhabit pools and slow-moving streams in subtropical forests.

== Diet ==
The emperor newt usually eats small invertebrates in its environment, such as crickets and worms. Emperor newts in captivity are typically given wax worms, crickets, and earthworms.

== Taxonomy ==
For a long time, emperor newts were classified together with the Himalayan newt (T. verrucosus).
