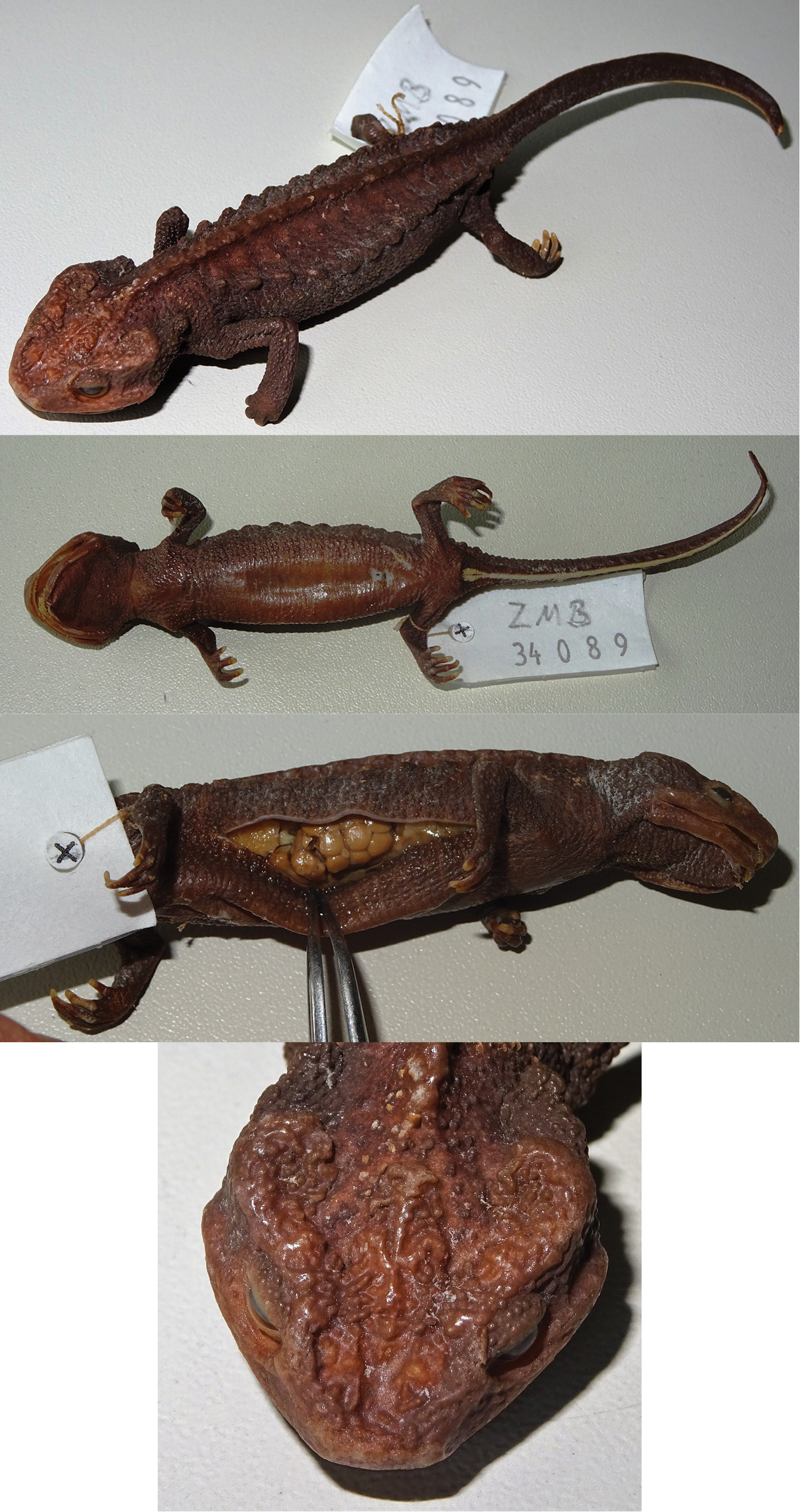

Conservation status
- Near Threatened (IUCN 3.1)

Scientific classification
- Kingdom: Animalia
- Phylum: Chordata
- Class: Amphibia
- Order: Urodela
- Family: Salamandridae
- Genus: Tylototriton
- Species: T. asperrimus

Binomial name
- Tylototriton asperrimus Unterstein, 1930

= Black knobby newt =

Species of salamander

The black knobby newt (Tylototriton asperrimus) is a species of salamanders in the family Salamandridae found in China and Vietnam. Its natural habitats are subtropical or tropical moist lowland forests, subtropical or tropical moist montane forests, freshwater marshes, and intermittent freshwater marshes. It is threatened by habitat loss and overharvesting.

The black knobby newt is a medium-sized newt, with total length of 12–15 cm (4.7–5.9 in).
