= Paddletail newt =

Paddletail newt or paddle-tail newt is a name used in pet trade for several species of newts in the following two genera:

- Pachytriton – the whole genus is also known as the paddletail newts
- Paramesotriton, particularly Paramesotriton labiatus (formerly Pachytriton labiatus)
