= Qingshanqiao, Ningxiang =

Qingshanqiao 青山桥镇
- Town
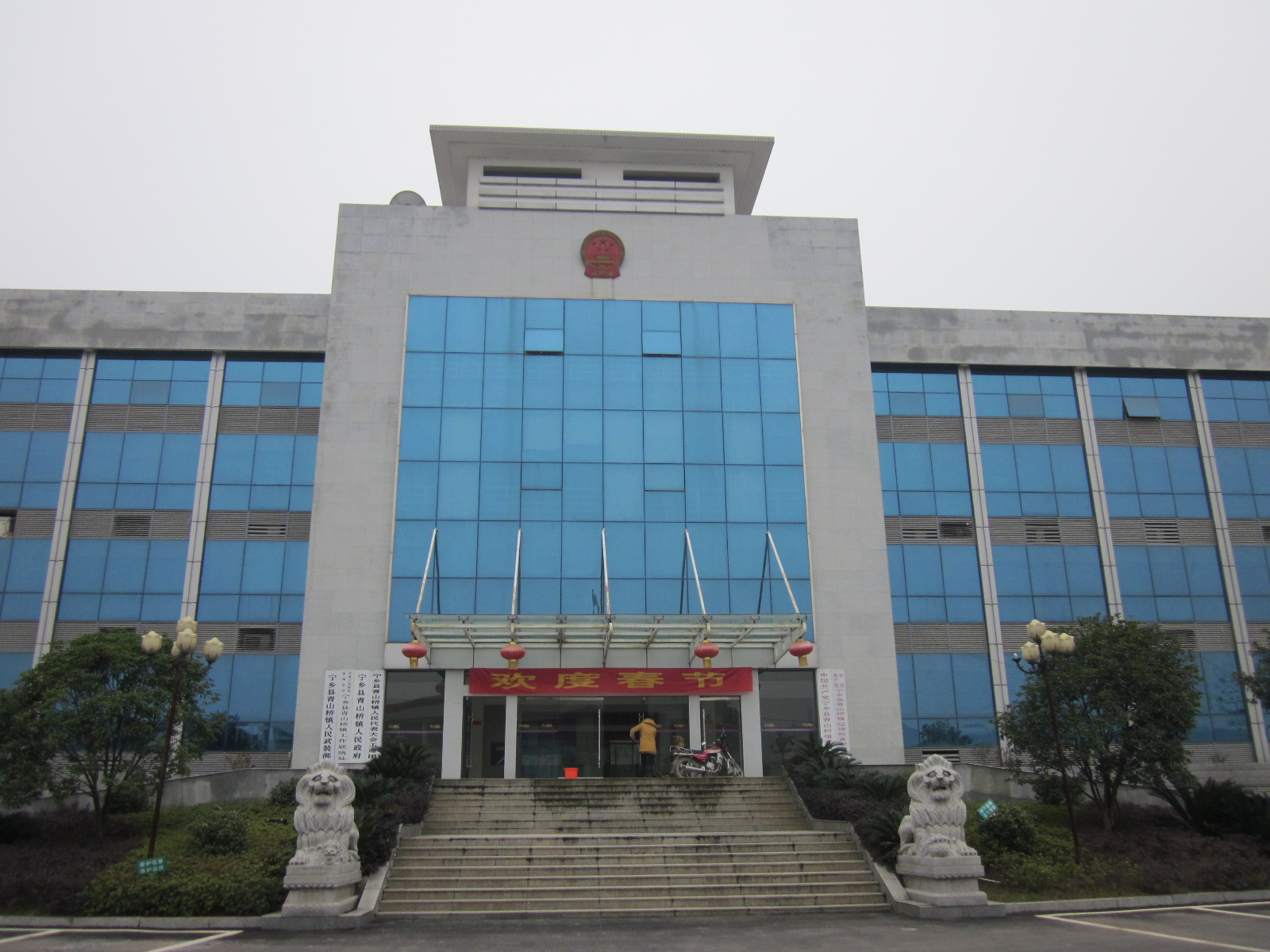
- Government building of Qingshanqiao
- Etymology: 青山, Qīngshān ("green mountains"); 桥, qiáo ("bridge")
- Location in Hunan
- Coordinates: 27°57′13″N 112°03′11″E
- Country: People's Republic of China
- Province: Hunan
- Prefecture-level city: Changsha
- County-level city: Ningxiang

Area
  - Total: 138 km^{2} (53 sq mi)

Population (2016)
  - Total: 55,000
  - Density: 400/km^{2} (1,000/sq mi)
- Time zone: UTC+08:00 (China Standard)
- Postal code: 410636
- Area code: 0731

Chinese name
- Traditional Chinese: 青山橋鎮
- Simplified Chinese: 青山桥镇
Transcriptions
Standard Mandarin
- Hanyu Pinyin: Qīngshānqiáo

Qingshanqiao (Chinese: 青山桥镇) is a town in Ningxiang, Hunan, China. It borders Loudi in the west, Lianyuan in the northwest, Longtian Town and Shatian Township in the north, Liushahe Town in the east, and Xiangxiang in the south. As of the 2016 census it had a population of 55,000 and an area of 138 square kilometres (53 sq mi). It is located at the intersection of Highway S209 and Highway S311, on the banks of the Chu River.

== Administrative divisions ==
After the adjustment of villages and towns in 2016, it includes eight villages and one community:

- Qingshanqiao Community (青山桥社区)
- Furong (芙蓉村)
- Zhufeng (竹峰村)
- Tianping (田坪村)
- Shangliu (上流村)
- Xintian (心田村)
- Shishiqiao (石狮桥村)
- Huayuantang (花园堂村)
- Tianxin (田心村)

== Geography ==
The Tianping Reservoir is the second largest body of water in Ningxiang and the second largest reservoir in Ningxiang, is the source of the Wei River.

The Huayuan Reservoir (花园水库) is a reservoir and the second largest body of water in the town.

The Chu River is known as "Liushahe", a tributary of the Wei River, it flows through Qingshanqiao Town.

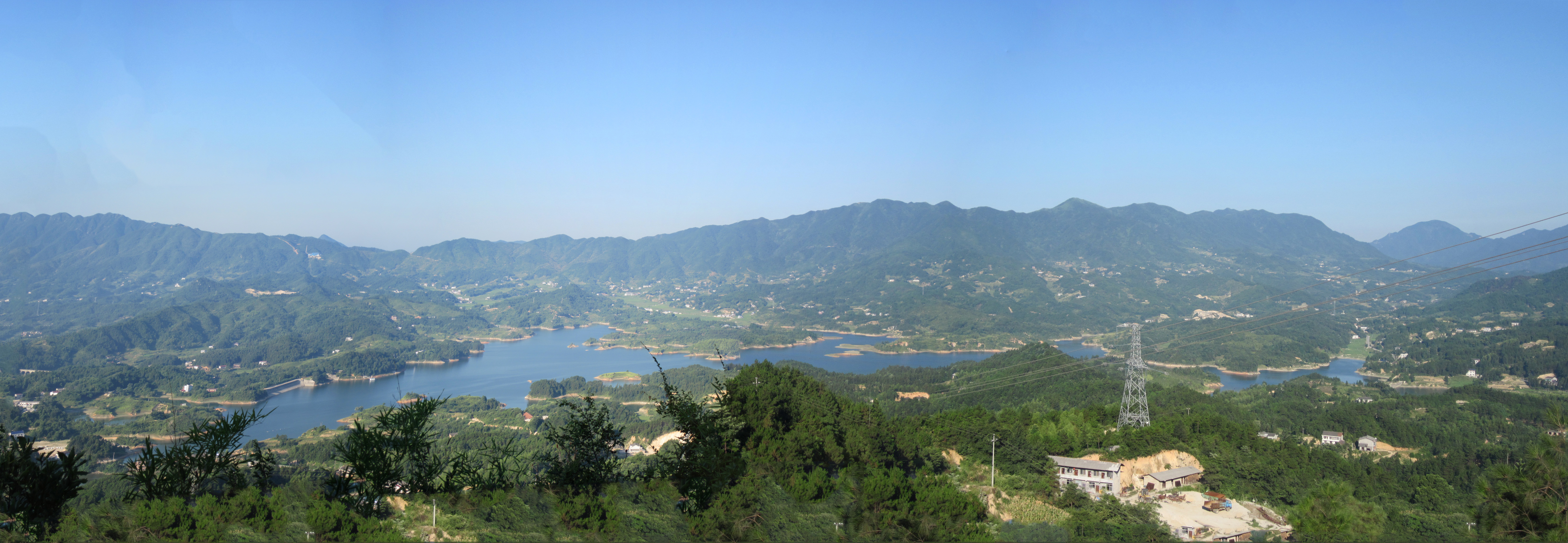
A panoramic view of Tianping Reservoir. Looking down from the Furong Mountain.

== Economy ==
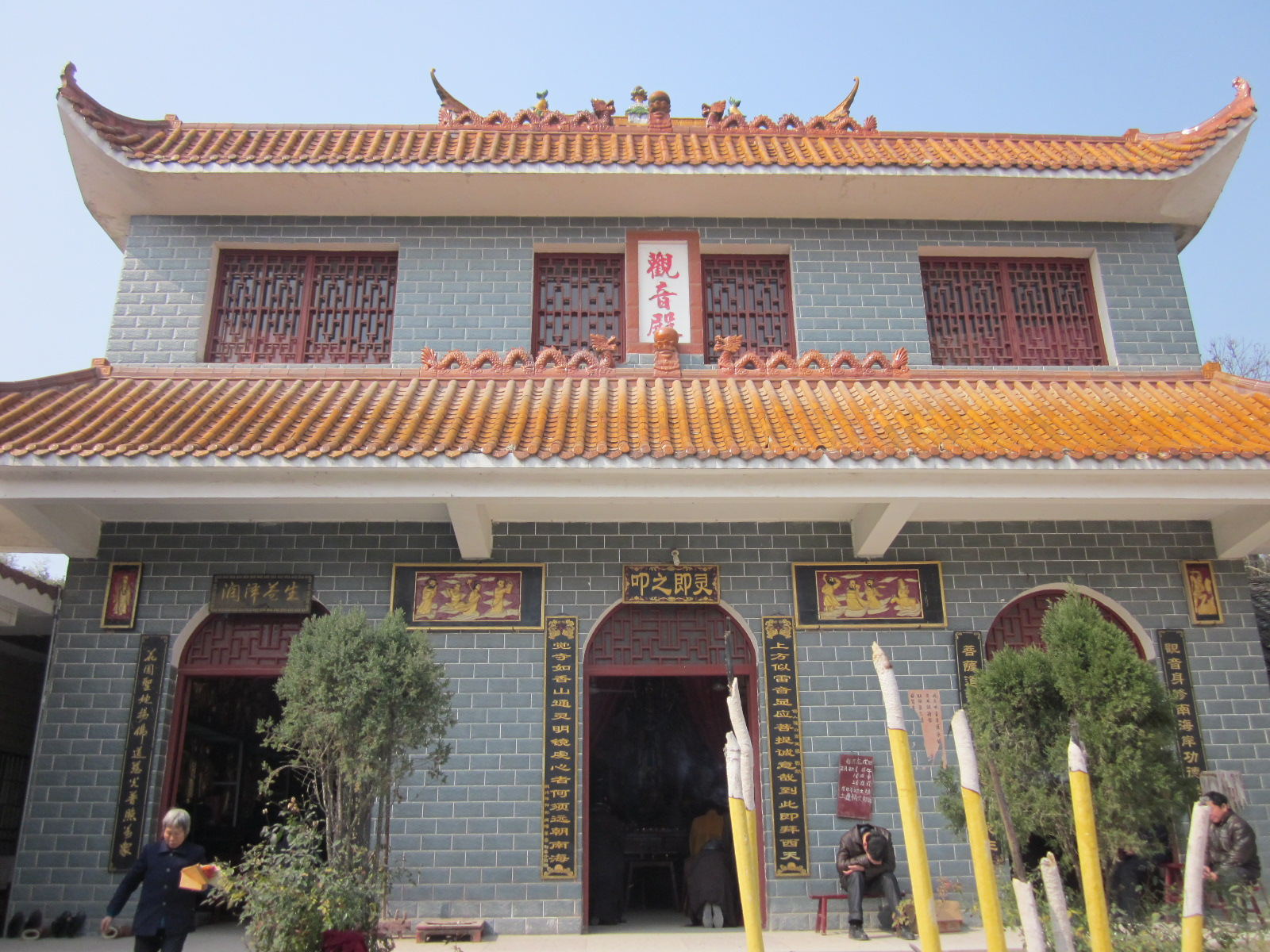
Shangliu Temple.

Tea and tobacco are important to the economy.

The Hongjia Mountain (洪家大山) and Jianding Mountain (尖顶山) contain the manganese ore. Xintian Village's soil contain a rich supply of potassium. The Furong Mountain contains a rich supply of granite.

== Education ==
There are four primary school located with the town limits: Qingshanqiao Central School (青山中心学校), Tianping School (田坪完小), Huayuan School (花园完小), Xintian School (心田完小).

Public junior high school in the town include the Qingshanqiao Junior High School (青山桥中学) and Xintian Junior High School (心田中学).

== Culture ==
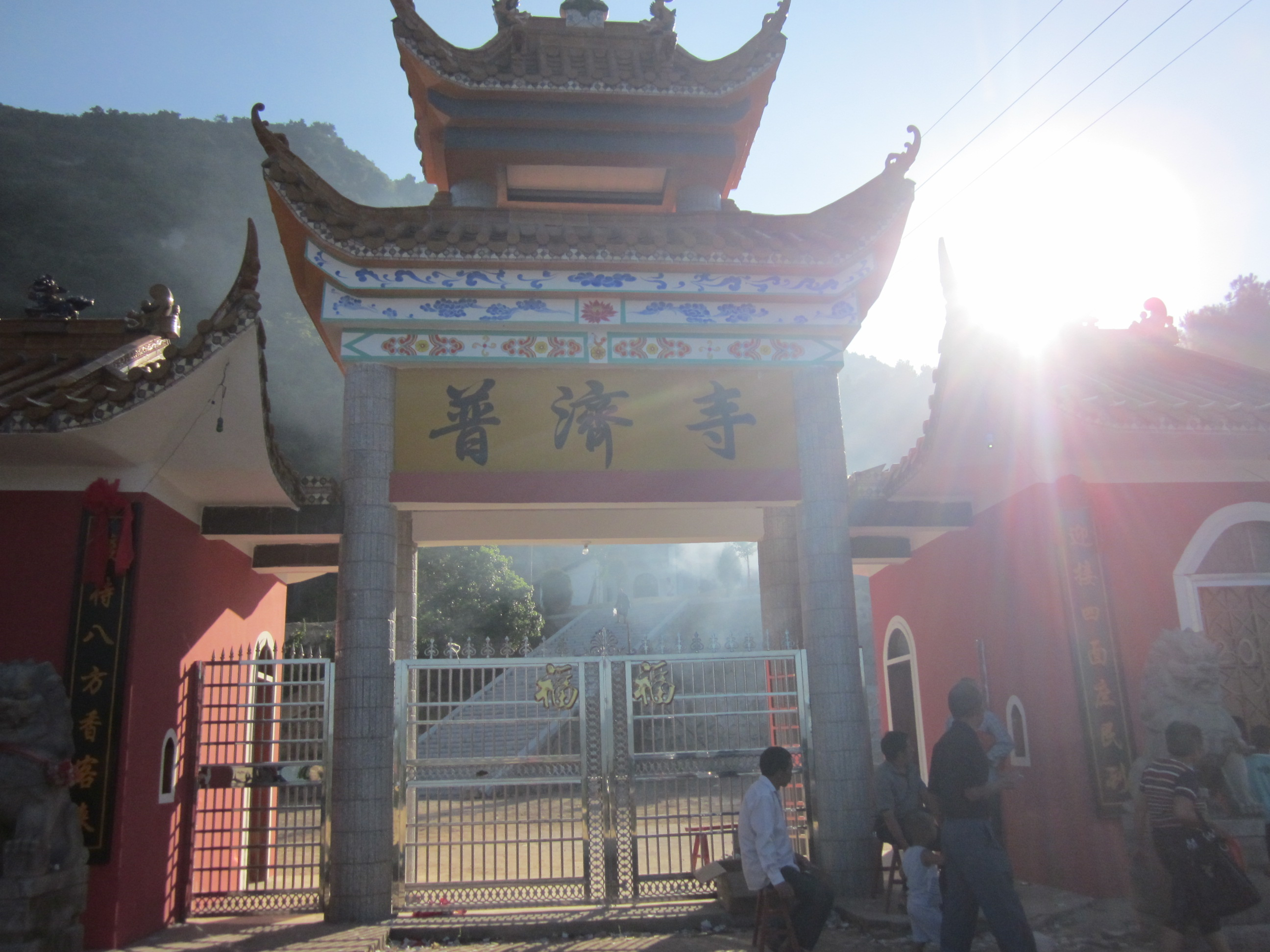
Puji Temple, is a Buddhist temple located in Qingshanqiao Town.

Huaguxi is the most influential local theater.

== Transportation ==
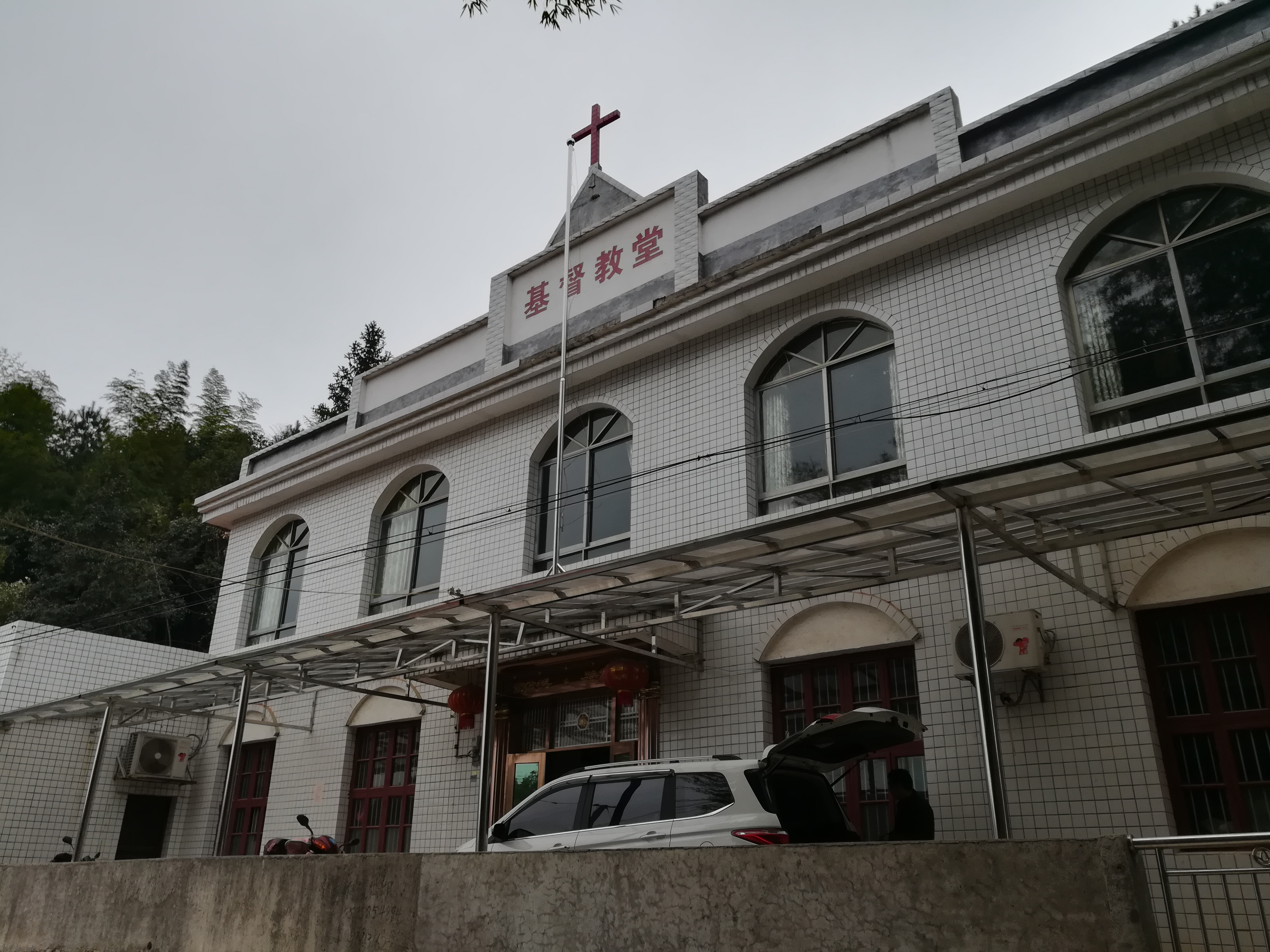
The Huayuan Christian Church is a Christian church in the town.

=== National Highway ===
The National Highway G234 travels through Hutian Town of Xiangxiang to Loudi.

=== Provincial Highway ===
Among the major highways that connect Qingshanqiao Town to the rest of Hunan Province include Provincial Highway S209, which runs east through Qiaobei Village to Liushahe Town. The Provincial Highway S311 runs northwest to Gaoming Township. The Provincial Highway S328 runs southeast to Fanjiang Town of Xiangxiang City.

=== Expressway ===
The Yilouheng Expressway (娄益衡高速公路) in the Hunan Province, which heads to Loudi City, Yiyang City and Hengyang City through the town.

The Changshaolou Expressway passes through the southeast of the town.

=== Railway ===
The Luoyang–Zhanjiang Railway, from Luoyang City, Henan Province to Zhanjiang City, Guangdong Province, through Qingshanqiao Town at Qingshanqiao Railway Station.

== Religion ==
Puji Temple is the largest Buddhist temple in the town. Located on the top of Furong Mountain of Furong Village, it was originally built in the Yuan dynasty (1271–1368) and later destroyed and rebuilt several times. It was last rebuilt in 2013. Buddha Qing'an is the main target of worship, the temple also worship the Three Saints of the West and Guan Yu.

Situated in Shangliu Village, Shangliu Temple is also a Buddhist temple in the town, which was built in the late Qing dynasty (1644–1911) for worship the Bodhisattva Guanyin and the Jade Emperor.

Huayuan Christian Church is a Christian church which sits in Huayuan Village of the town.

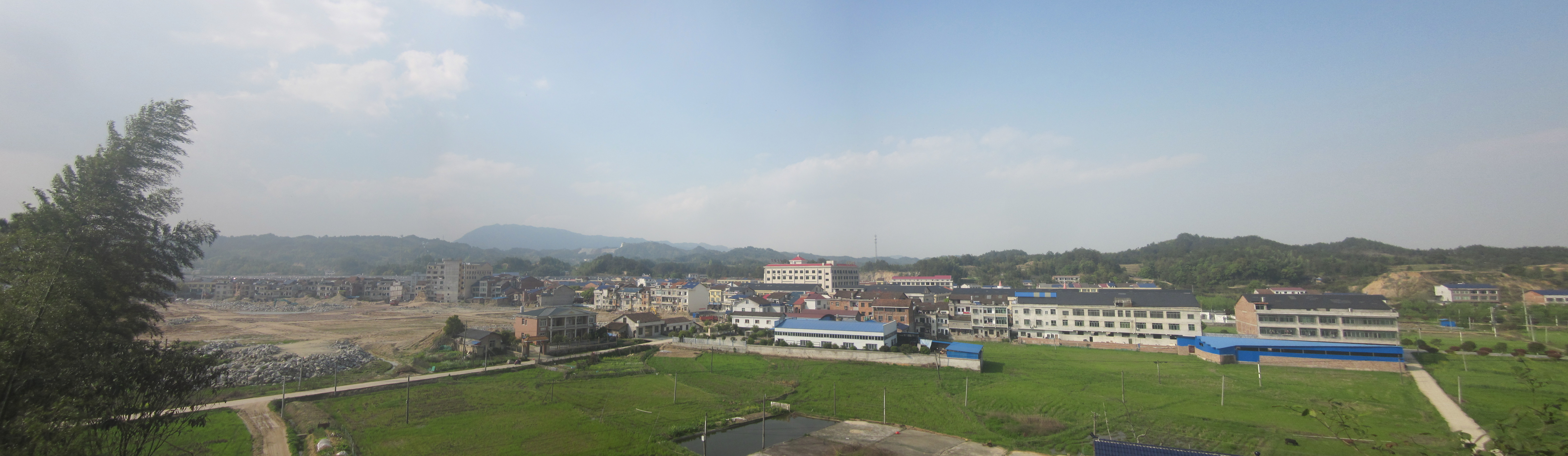
A panoramic view of Qingshanqiao.

== Notable residents ==
- Writer: Tang Sulan
- Revolutionary martyr: Li Jialong (李甲龙).
- Star: Gong Xianlan (龚献兰), won the Hunan TV's program "Beautiful Village Girl"(《美丽村姑》).
