= Chu River (Wei River tributary) =

River in Hunan, China

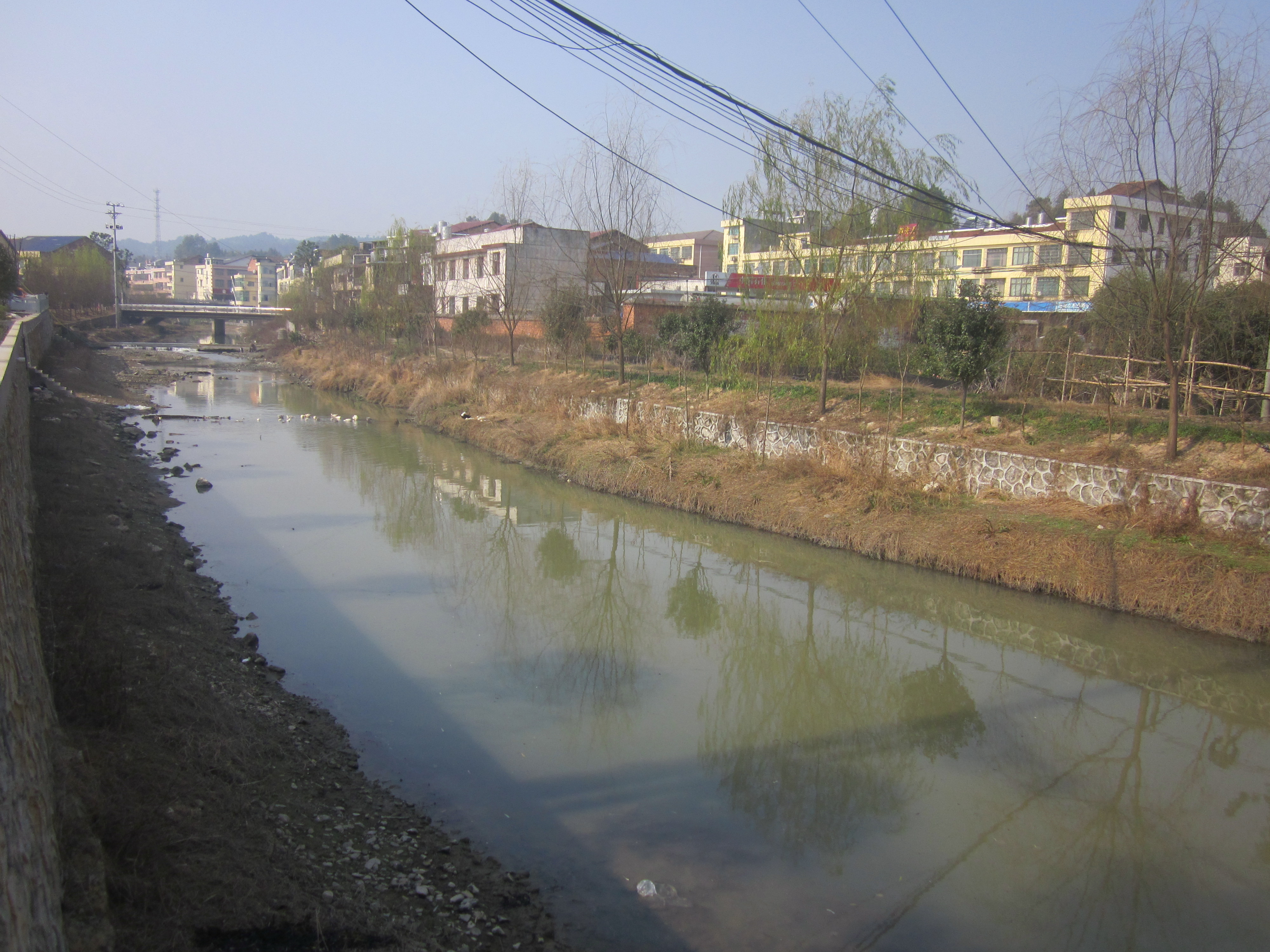
- Picture of Chu River in the town of Qingshanqiao of Ningxiang City.

- Location on Hunan.
- Native name: 楚江 (Chinese)

Physical characteristics
- Source: Longtian Town
  - location: Ningxiang, Hunan
- Mouth: Wei River
- Length: 48 km (30 mi)
- Basin size: 412 km^{2} (159 mi^{2})

Basin features
- Waterbodies: Tianping Reservoir

Chu River (Chinese: 楚江; pinyin: Chǔ Jiāng) is the second largest river in Ningxiang and one of the largest tributaries of the Wei River. It originates in Longtian Town, is 48 kilometres (30 mi) long, and its valley has an area of 412 square kilometres (159 mi^{2}).

Its main tributaries include the Caochong (草沖河) and the Yanghua (阳华江). The river passes Qingshanqiao, Liushahe, Laoliangcang, and Hengshi, and empties into the Wei in Hengshi.
