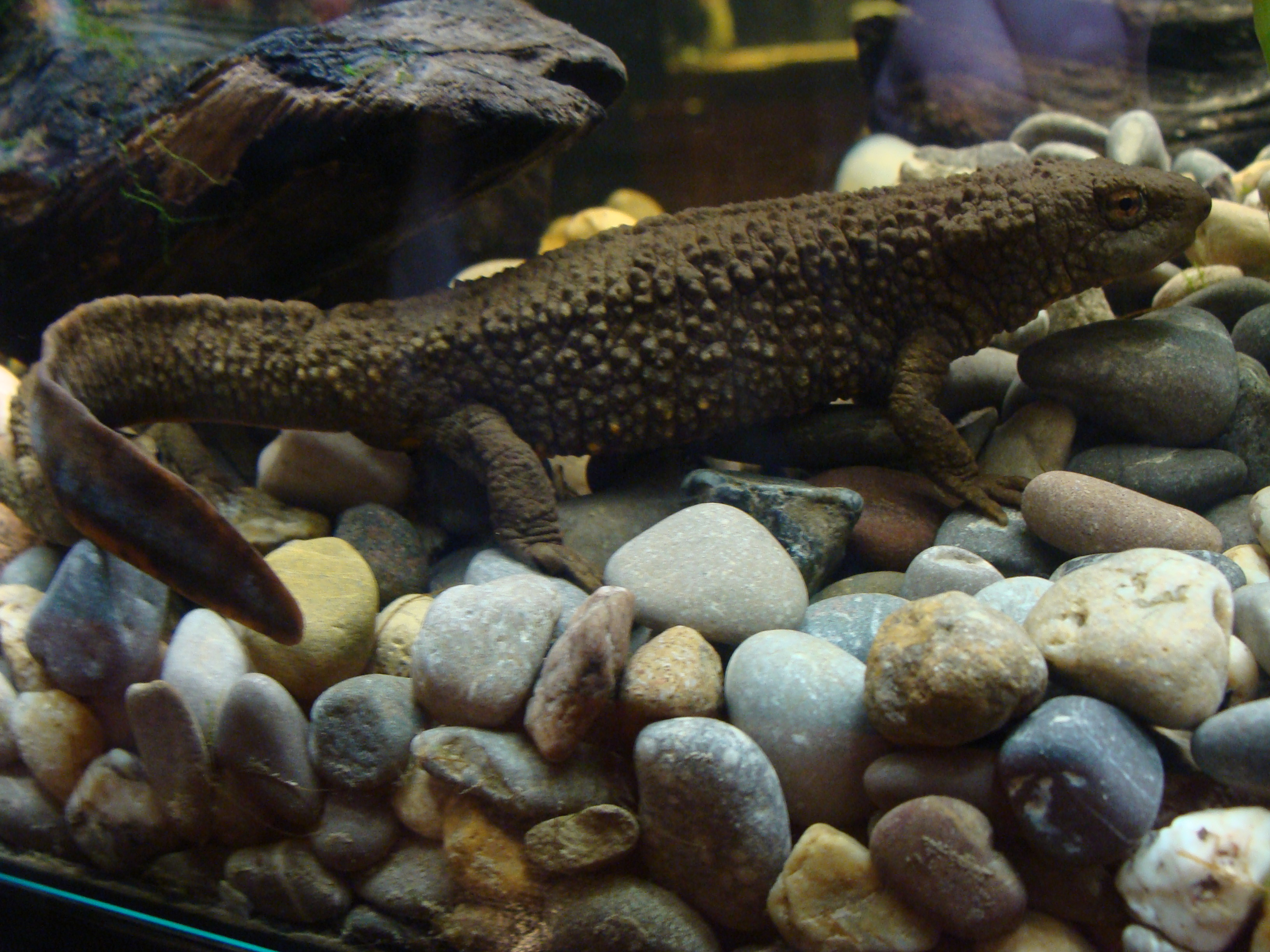

Conservation status
- Near Threatened (IUCN 3.1)

Scientific classification
- Kingdom: Animalia
- Phylum: Chordata
- Class: Amphibia
- Order: Urodela
- Family: Salamandridae
- Genus: Paramesotriton
- Species: P. hongkongensis

Binomial name
- Paramesotriton hongkongensis (Myers and Leviton, 1962)

= Hong Kong warty newt =

Species of amphibian

The Hong Kong warty newt or Hong Kong newt (Paramesotriton hongkongensis, see also the synonyms) is a species of salamander (newt) found in Hong Kong. Once thought to be endemic to the territory, the species has also been found in the coastal parts of Guangdong Province. It is the only Urodela living in Hong Kong.

This newt is considered by some naturalists as a subspecies of Paramesotriton chinensis. However, some disagree with such a classification based on the disjunctive distribution of the two, and the differences in their physical appearance and habitat preference.

== Description ==
The snout-to-tail length of the newt is about 11 to 15 cm. Its body colour ranges from light to dark brown, with patches of orange markings scattered on the ventral side. The patterns of the patches are unique for each individual, resembling the fingerprints of humans. Small granules can be found throughout the body. A mid-dorsal skin ridge extends backwards from the neck through the anterior third of the tail. Two dorsolateral folds are also present.

The head is roughly triangular. The eyes have horizontal pupils. The tail is thin and flattened, with a thin, red stripe along the ventral border. The four legs are similar in size. Four and five unwebbed digits can be found at the anterior and posterior limbs, respectively.

As with other newts, the tadpoles have finger-like gills around their necks, which disappear completely after metamorphosis.

When threatened, it releases a toxic secretion and may also feign death, rolling onto its back, exposing its brightly coloured belly.

In the breeding season, the male displays by beating its tail, which develops a white or bluish stripe which is visible in dim light. Sperm is transferred to the female in a spermatophore. Eggs are laid singly and are wrapped in leaves.

== Conservation ==
In Hong Kong, it is a protected species under Wild Animals Protection Ordinance Cap 170.
