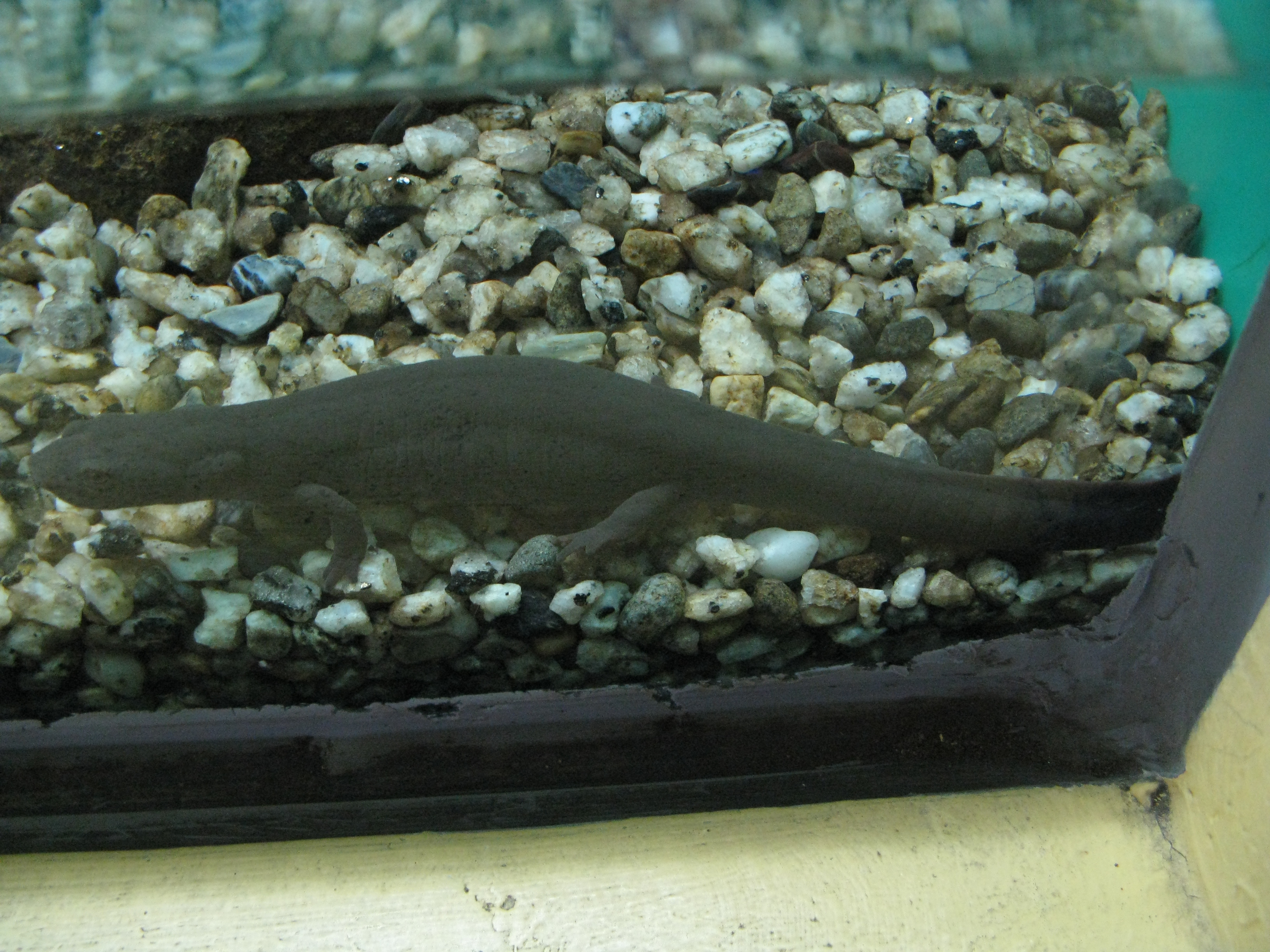

Conservation status
- Critically Endangered (IUCN 3.1)

Scientific classification
- Kingdom: Animalia
- Phylum: Chordata
- Class: Amphibia
- Order: Urodela
- Family: Salamandridae
- Genus: Paramesotriton
- Species: P. labiatus

Binomial name
- Paramesotriton labiatus (Unterstein, 1930)

Synonyms
- Molge labiatum Unterstein, 1930; Pachytriton labiatus (Unterstein, 1930; Paramesotriton ermizhaoi Wu, Rovito, Papenfuss & Hanken, 2009

= Paramesotriton labiatus =

Species of amphibian

Paramesotriton labiatus is a species of newt in the family Salamandridae. It is endemic to Guangxi, China. In literature prior to 2011, this species may have been confused with Paramesotriton chinensis, Pachytriton granulosus, or Paramesotriton ermizhaoi (the last now in synonymy). This species has several vernacular names, including Unterstein's newt, spotless stout newt, spotless smooth warty newt, Zhao Ermi's smooth warty newt, and paddletail newt.

== Description ==
The paddle-tail newt is characterized by a flat body and a long, paddle-like tail. They range from black to brown to pale brown. They have orange markings along the bottom of their bodies and may have some orange dots lining their backs. Their skin is very smooth with a secretion of mucus, and their limbs are relatively short. The morphology and size of this species are similar to, if not larger than, Pachytriton brevipes.

They use their senses of sight and smell to locate food. Since food is scarce for them in their natural environments, they can go for weeks without eating, but should be fed regularly when kept in captivity. Paddle-tail newt longevity in the wild is currently unknown, but in captivity it usually ranges from 10 to 20 years.

Paddle-tail newts, uniquely, are known for their communication. They fan their tails when they are trying to attract the attention of another newt, when they are startled or frightened, or when approached by a conspecific.

Paddle-tail newts are sometimes confused with the Japanese fire belly newts and sold as such, but are much larger and more aggressive and will eat smaller firebelly newts if given the opportunity.

They have a similar relation named the spotted paddle-tail newt.
