= Furong Mountain =

Mountain in Hunan, China

- 芙蓉山
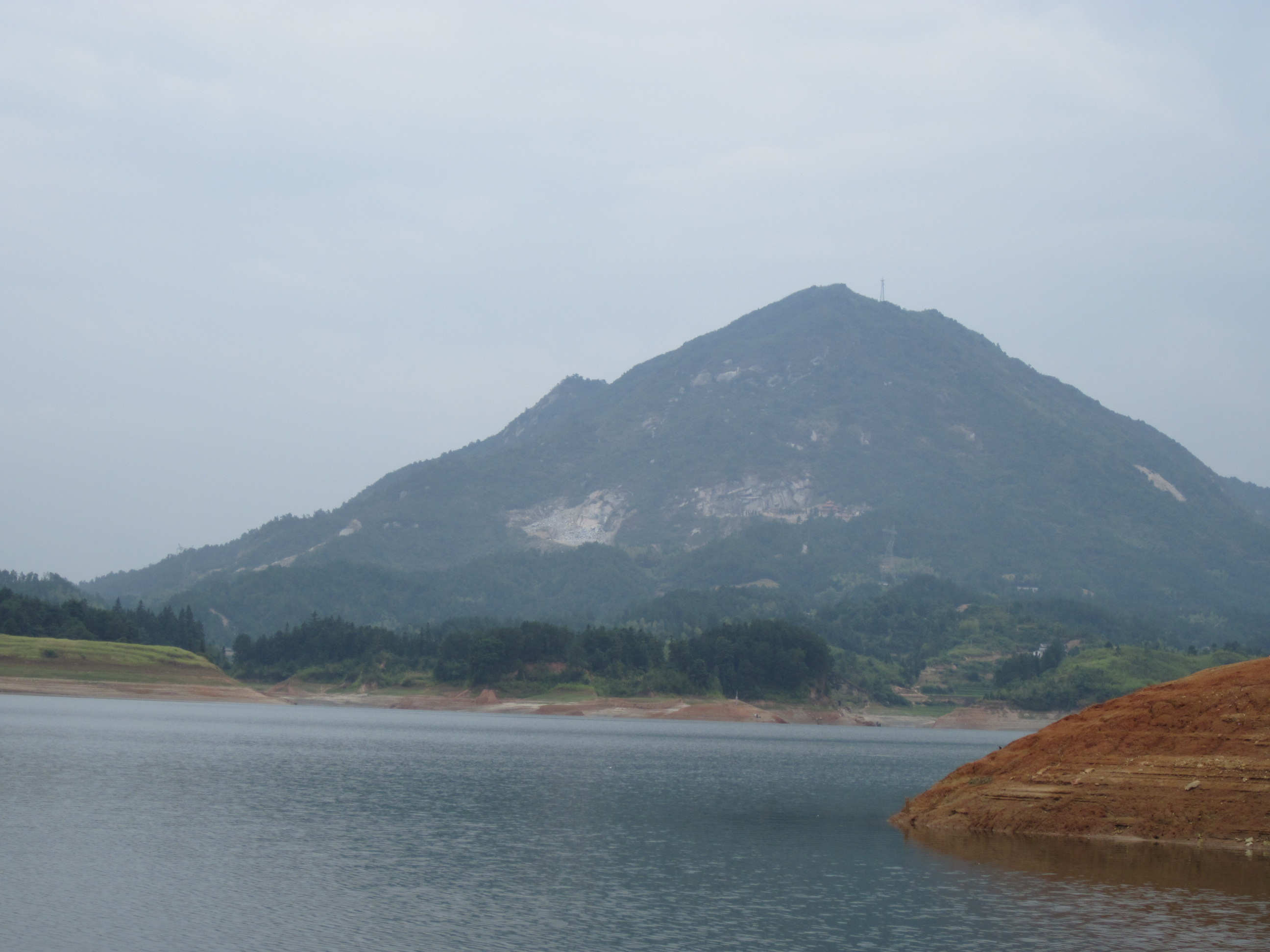

Highest point
- Elevation: 860 m (2,820 ft)
- Prominence: 860 m (2,820 ft)
- Coordinates: 28°00′26″N 112°01′50″E

Geography
- Location within Hunan
- Country: China
- Province: Hunan
- Parent range: Xuefeng Mountains

Geology
- Rock type: Granite

Furong Mountain (Chinese: 芙蓉山; pinyin: Fúróngshān; lit. 'Hibiscus Mountain') is located in the town of Qingshanqiao in the southwest of Ningxiang, Hunan, China, with a height of 860 metres (2,820 ft) above sea level.

Furong Mountain is noted for Puji Temple, a Buddhist temple located on the top of the mountain, which was built in the Yuan dynasty, and the temple's original name was Furong'an. It is the subject of a poem by Tang poet, Liu Zhangqing.

== See also ==
- List of mountains in Ningxiang
