= Paramesotriton yunwuensis =

Conservation status
- Endangered (IUCN 3.1)

Scientific classification
- Kingdom: Animalia
- Phylum: Chordata
- Class: Amphibia
- Order: Urodela
- Family: Salamandridae
- Genus: Paramesotriton
- Species: P. yunwuensis

Binomial name
- Paramesotriton yunwuensis Wu, Jiang, and Hanken, 2010

Species of salamander

Paramesotriton yunwuensis is a species of salamander in the family Salamandridae. It is endemic to the Yunwu Mountains in Guangdong, southern China, and known from its type locality near Nanchong village, Fuhe, Luoding City, and from the Yunkai National National Nature Reserve. Common name Yunwu warty newt has been coined for it.

== Description ==
Adult males measure 93–105 mm (3.7–4.1 in) and adult females 73–88 mm (2.9–3.5 in) in snout–vent length. The overall appearance is robust. The head is large, longer than it is wide and wider than the neck. The snout is truncate. Large warts are present on the head and dorsolateral ridges. Males have an inconspicuous vertebral ridge whereas this is more conspicuous in females. Forelimb are very short. The digits have no webbing. The tail is laterally compressed and has a rounded tip. Dorsal coloration in adults ranges from reddish brown to olive brown. Ventral color pattern varies from black background with a few orange blotches to orange with many small black flecks. Males have a bluish-white caudal stripe on the posterior half of the tail. Subadults are black, apart from orange blotches on the venter.

== Habitat and conservation ==
Paramesotriton yunwuensis occurs in cold, clear, slow-moving streams and pools surrounded by evergreen broad-leaved forest at elevations of 300–1,200 m (980–3,940 ft) above sea level. They are active in the deeper parts of pools during the day and can be found in shallower parts by night. Breeding takes place in the same streams.

This species is relatively common in Yunwu Mountains. However, the total population is still small (<2,500 adults), and this number is believed to be declining. Collection for the pet trade as well as habitat degradation and pollution caused by hydropower and tourism are threats.
