= Jinzhou Lake National Wetland Park =

Wetland in Hunan, China

- 金洲湖国家湿地公园
- Location within Hunan
- Type: Public park
- Location: Ningxiang, Hunan, China
- Coordinates: 28°16′N 112°34′E
- Area: 18.38 square kilometres (7.10 sq mi)
- Created: 2009
- Status: Open all year

Chinese name
- Simplified Chinese: 金洲湖国家湿地公园
- Traditional Chinese: 金洲湖國家濕地公園
Transcriptions
Standard Mandarin
- Hanyu Pinyin: Jīnzhōu Hú Guójiā Shīdì Gōngyuán

Jinzhou Lake National Wetland Park (Chinese: 金洲湖国家湿地公园) is a national wetland park located in Ningxiang, Hunan, China.

== History ==
Jinzhou Lake National Wetland Park was approved for trial construction by the National Forestry Administration (now National Forestry and Grassland Administration) in December 2009. After six years of ecological restoration and infrastructure development, it passed national inspections and was formally granted the status of a national wetland park in 2016.

== Geography ==
Jinzhou Lake National Wetland Park is centered on the Wei River, a primary tributary of the Xiang River.

=== Climate ===
The park experiences a humid subtropical monsoon climate, characterized by hot, rainy summers and mild, drier winters. Seasonal flooding and rainfall contribute to the rich biodiversity and wetland ecosystem functions.

== Ecology ==
=== Flora and fauna ===
Jinzhou Lake National Wetland Park supports 287 species of vascular plants from 105 families.

Jinzhou Lake National Wetland Park provides habitat for 125 bird species, including 10 nationally protected species such as the mandarin duck, oriental scops owl, and black-winged kite. Additionally, 46 fish species and 12 state-protected wild animal species are recorded, along with 107 provincially protected species.

== Main attractions ==
- Jinzhou Lake (金洲湖; Jīnzhōu Hú): the core water area formed by the Wei River, offering scenic views and recreational activities.
- Jinzhou Wind-rain Corridor Bridge (金洲风雨廊桥; 金州風雨廊橋; Jīnzhōu Fēngyǔ Lángqiáo): a 270-metre (890 ft)-long covered bridge, one of the longest of its kind in Hunan, blending architectural elegance with natural surroundings.
- Zhuangyuan Tower (状元楼; 狀元樓; Zhuàngyuán Lóu): a historic tower situated on an isle, symbolizing local cultural heritage.
- Eel Isle (鳝鱼洲; 鱔魚洲; Shànyú Zhōu) and Liuzi Isle (溜子洲; Liūzǐ Zhōu): two protected isles serving as vital habitats for birds and plants.
