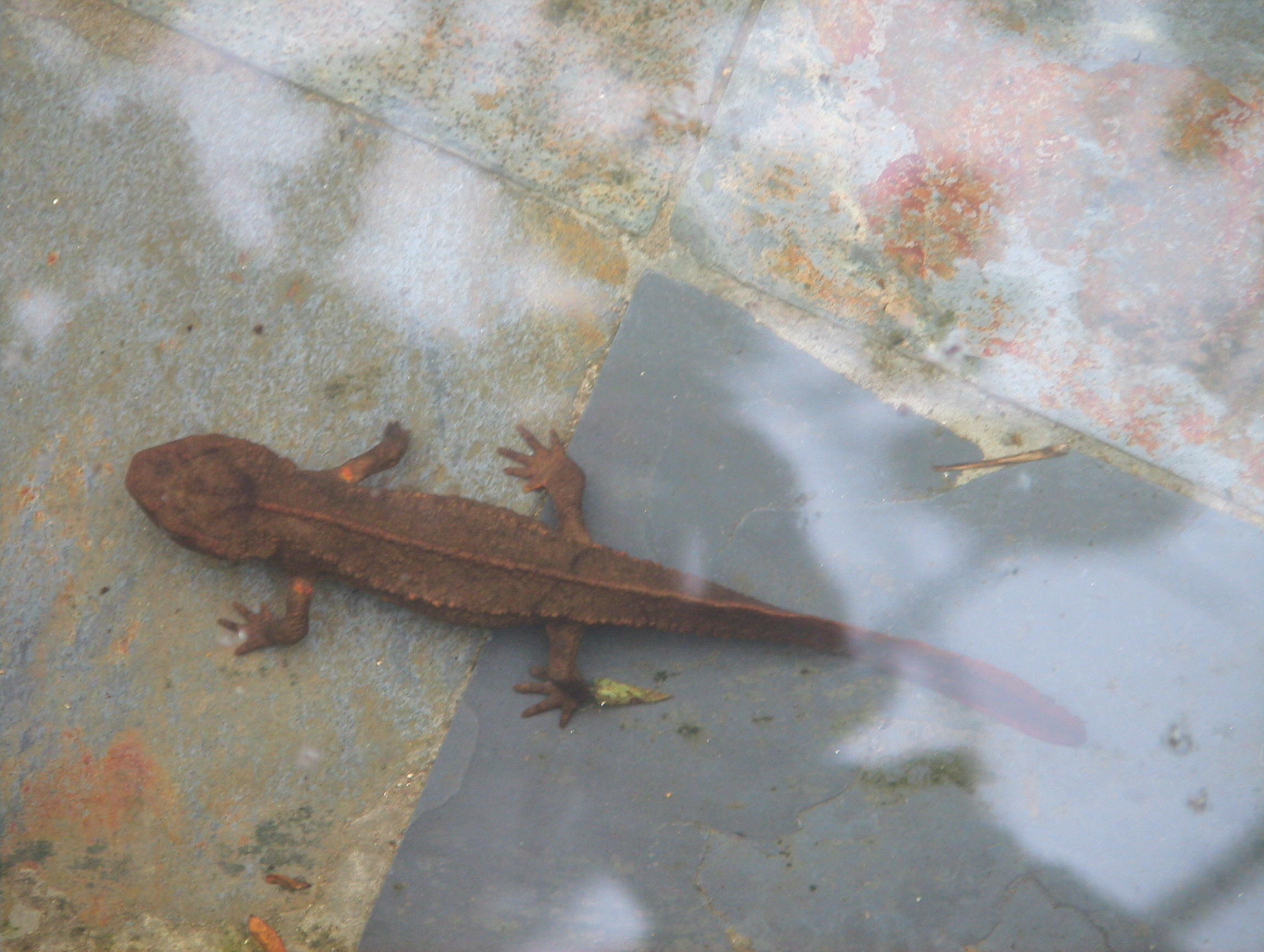

Conservation status
- Least Concern (IUCN 3.1)

Scientific classification
- Kingdom: Animalia
- Phylum: Chordata
- Class: Amphibia
- Order: Urodela
- Family: Salamandridae
- Genus: Paramesotriton
- Species: P. deloustali

Binomial name
- Paramesotriton deloustali (Bourret, 1934)

= Tam Dao salamander =

Species of amphibian

The Tam Dao salamander, Vietnamese salamander, or Vietnam warty newt (Paramesotriton deloustali) is a species of salamander in the family Salamandridae found only in Vietnam, with potential presence in Yunnan, China. Its natural habitats are subtropical or tropical moist lowland forests, subtropical or tropical moist montane forests, and rivers. It is threatened by habitat loss and poaching.

== Populations ==
Within Northern Vietnam, two groups of the species exist, a west and an east group, which is consistent with a hypothesis that the Paramesotriton genus diverged along the west and east. The two populations inhabit similar environments, but have shown differences in their ecological niches.

== Conservation ==
While the Tam Dao salamander may be listed as "Least Concern" by the IUCN, the species may be smaller in population size than previously imagined. Analysis of mitochondrial DNA and morphology of salamanders within the Quang Ninh Province suggests that what are believed to be Tam Dao salamanders may actually be Paramesotriton guangxiensis, reducing the range of the species and raising more concern on the vulnerability of the species. In addition to this, genetic analyses have also shown that the species has a lack of nucleotide diversity.

Habitat loss has come in form of agricultural development. The species is also threatened by water pollution and flooding in the lowlands they occupy. The species is also isolated into different populations because of these reasons, contributing to the potential vulnerability of the Tam Dao salamander.
