= List of mountains in Ningxiang =

The following is a list of mountains in Ningxiang City, Hunan Province, China.

== List ==
Mountain range	Name (English)	Name (Chinese)	High (m)
South branch of Xuefeng Mountains	Gushi Mountain	古狮仑	987.4m
South branch of Xuefeng Mountains	Shanzipai	扇子排	922.8m
South branch of Xuefeng Mountains	Hongjia Mountain	洪家大山	875.9m
South branch of Xuefeng Mountains	Sanjiaozhai	三角寨	629.4m
South branch of Xuefeng Mountains	Fusi Mountain	罘罳峰	410.6m
South branch of Xuefeng Mountains	Wangbei Mountain	望北峰	474m
South branch of Xuefeng Mountains	Tangpa Mountain	趟耙仑	353.2m
South branch of Xuefeng Mountains	Maojia Mountain	毛家大山	404m
South branch of Xuefeng Mountains	Huilong Mountain	回龙山	365m
South branch of Xuefeng Mountains	Wuniu Mountain	乌牛山	437m
South branch of Xuefeng Mountains	Baishizhai	白石寨	292m
South branch of Xuefeng Mountains	Furongzhai	芙蓉寨	314.1m
South branch of Xuefeng Mountains	Dongwu Mountain	东务山	429.8m
South branch of Xuefeng Mountains	Qixingzhai	七星寨	279.7m
North branch of Xuefeng Mountains	Jianfengding	尖峰顶	823m
North branch of Xuefeng Mountains	Fuyu Mountain	扶玉山	969.8m
North branch of Xuefeng Mountains	Pingfeng Mountain	平峰山	446.5m
North branch of Xuefeng Mountains	Lianyu Mountain	鲢鱼山	460.5m
North branch of Xuefeng Mountains	Jiulong Mountain	九龙山	330.5m
North branch of Xuefeng Mountains	Bogongzhai	博公寨	465.7m
North branch of Xuefeng Mountains	Mashi Mountain	麻石峰	435.2m
North branch of Xuefeng Mountains	Shuangru Mountain	双乳峰	470.5m
North branch of Xuefeng Mountains	Jiuzhe Mountain	九折仑	599.4m
North branch of Xuefeng Mountains	Wei Mountain	沩山	712.8m
North branch of Xuefeng Mountains	Dalunshang	大仑上	768m
North branch of Xuefeng Mountains	Jiulun Mountain	九仑山	599.4m
North branch of Xuefeng Mountains	Chengqiang Mountain	城墙大山	795m
North branch of Xuefeng Mountains	Hougong Mountain	猴公大山	917.5m
North branch of Xuefeng Mountains	Yangtou Mountain	羊头山	780m
North branch of Xuefeng Mountains	Daguoding	大锅顶	796.7m
North branch of Xuefeng Mountains	Yuntai Mountain	云台山	640.5m
North branch of Xuefeng Mountains	Chazi Mountain	茶子山	229.5m
North branch of Xuefeng Mountains	Gaolunpo	高伦坡	160m
North branch of Xuefeng Mountains	Shazipo	沙子坡	145m
North branch of Xuefeng Mountains	Shengxiangong Mountain	圣仙公山	127.2m
South branch of Heng Mountain	Shizi Mountain	狮子山	283.3m
South branch of Heng Mountain	Xiannü Mountain	仙女岭	211.2m
South branch of Heng Mountain	Xiaoyu Mountain	小鱼岭	219.6m
South branch of Heng Mountain	Dajie Mountain	大界岭	232m
South branch of Heng Mountain	Gaolu Mountain	高露山	173m
South branch of Heng Mountain	Lumaotang Mountain	芦茅塘山	106.9m
South branch of Heng Mountain	Biandan'ao	扁担坳	265.9m
South branch of Heng Mountain	Fengxing Mountain	凤形山	298.5m
South branch of Heng Mountain	Luoxianzhai	罗先寨	426.1m
North branch of Heng Mountain	Shizi Mountain	十字岭	214.8m
North branch of Heng Mountain	Zhaizi Mountain	寨子仑	300.2m
North branch of Heng Mountain	Pusa Mountain	菩萨岭	384.4m
North branch of Heng Mountain	Shizi Mountain	狮子山	168.7m
