= Pachytriton inexpectatus =

Scientific classification
- Kingdom: Animalia
- Phylum: Chordata
- Class: Amphibia
- Order: Urodela
- Family: Salamandridae
- Genus: Pachytriton
- Species: P. inexpectatus

Binomial name
- Pachytriton inexpectatus Nishikawa, Jiang, Matsui, and Mo, 2011

Species of salamander

Pachytriton inexpectatus is a species of salamander in the family Salamandridae. It is endemic to southern China and found in the Guizhou, Hunan, Guangdong, and Guangxi provinces. Its type locality is Mount Dayao of Jinxiu Yao Autonomous County, Guangxi. Prior to naming of this species in 2011, it was confused with Pachytriton labiatus (now Paramesotriton labiatus). It is one of the several species that can appear in the pet trade as paddletail newt. The specific name inexpectatus is Latin meaning "unexpected" and refers to finding a species that is common in pet trade but lacked formal scientific description. Common name Yaoshan stout newt has been coined specifically for this species.

== Description ==
Adult males measure 69–99 mm (2.7–3.9 in) in snout–vent length and 128–197 mm (5.0–7.8 in) in total length. Adult females measure 76–109 mm (3.0–4.3 in) in snout–vent length and 144–207 mm (5.7–8.1 in) in total length. The body is stout. The fingers and the toes have slight webbing. The tail tip is broad. Skin is smooth. The dorsum is uniformly dark brown. The venter is lighter and has reddish orange markings, some of them joining to form two longitudinal lines. There are small reddish orange markings scattered on throat and underside of limbs; some specimens have an orange spot on the dorsal base of each limb. The underside of tail and cloaca are reddish orange.

== Habitat and conservation ==
Adult Pachytriton inexpectatus live in mountain rivers, including steep and shallow side streams. They are nocturnal and prey upon aquatic insects, crustaceans, and annelids, as well as insects of terrestrial origin. Breeding seems to occur in early summer. Small juveniles are probably terrestrial.

As of mid-2018, this species has not been assessed for the IUCN Red List of Threatened Species.
