= Pachytriton moi =

Scientific classification
- Kingdom: Animalia
- Phylum: Chordata
- Class: Amphibia
- Order: Urodela
- Family: Salamandridae
- Genus: Pachytriton
- Species: P. moi

Binomial name
- Pachytriton moi Nishikawa, Jiang, and Matsui, 2011

Species of salamander

Pachytriton moi is a species of salamander in the family Salamandridae. It is endemic to Guangxi, China, and known from its type locality, Huaping National Nature Reserve in Longsheng County, and from Mao'er Mountain in Ziyuan County.
