= Tianping Reservoir =

- Qingshan Lake
- 田坪水库 (Chinese)
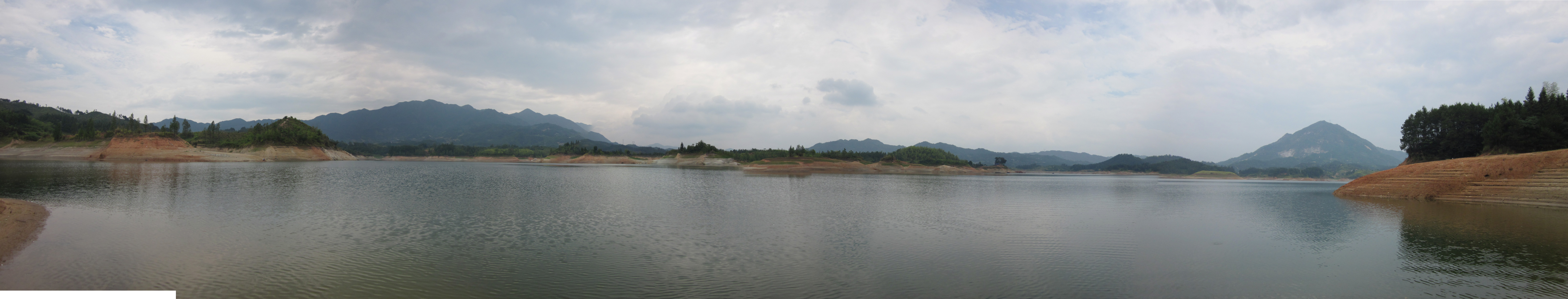
- Tianping Reservoir

- Location within Hunan
- Location: Qingshanqiao Town, Ningxiang, Hunan
- Coordinates: 27°59′24″N 111°59′53″E
- Type: Reservoir
- Primary outflows: Wei River
- Basin countries: China
- Built: 1970s
- First flooded: 1970s
- Surface area: 4.2 square kilometres (1,000 acres)
- Water volume: 44,160,000 cubic metres (11.67×10^{9} US gal)

The Tianping Reservoir (simplified Chinese: 田坪水库; traditional Chinese: 田坪水庫; pinyin: Tiánpíng Shuǐkù), also known as Qingshan Lake (Chinese: 青山湖), is a large reservoir located in the western part of Ningxiang, Hunan, China. It is the largest body of water in Ningxiang and the second largest reservoir in Ningxiang. The reservoir is the source of the Wei River.

Created by damming some small rivers, the Tianping Reservoir has an area of 4.2 square kilometres (1,000 acres) and a capacity of 4,416 cubic metres (0.001167×10^{9} US gal).

== History ==
In the 1970s Yang Shifang (杨世芳), head of the People's Government of Ningxiang, planned to build a reservoir for irrigation, flood control, electricity generation and fish farming. Due to poverty, the government mobilized the masses and used a large amount of human resources to complete the build rather than use heavy construction equipment.

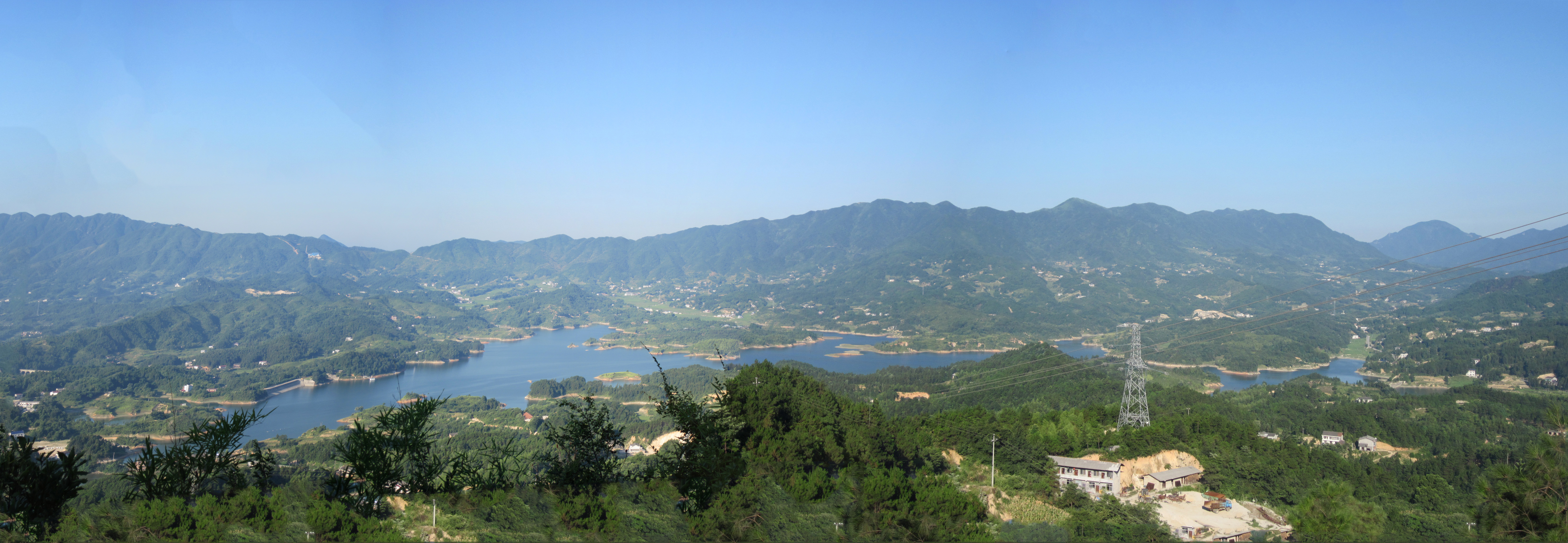
Looking down from the Furong Mountain.
