= Paramesotriton zhijinensis =

Scientific classification
- Kingdom: Animalia
- Phylum: Chordata
- Class: Amphibia
- Order: Urodela
- Family: Salamandridae
- Genus: Paramesotriton
- Species: P. zhijinensis

Binomial name
- Paramesotriton zhijinensis Zhao et al., 2008

Species of salamander

Paramesotriton zhijinensis is a species of salamander in the family Salamandridae. It is found only in Shuangyan Pond (26°40'N 105°46' E), 1310 m, Zhijin County, Guizhou Province, People's Republic of China.
