= Pachytriton xanthospilos =

Conservation status
- Critically Endangered (IUCN 3.1)

Scientific classification
- Kingdom: Animalia
- Phylum: Chordata
- Class: Amphibia
- Order: Urodela
- Family: Salamandridae
- Genus: Pachytriton
- Species: P. xanthospilos

Binomial name
- Pachytriton xanthospilos Wu, Wang, and Hanken, 2012

Species of salamander

Pachytriton xanthospilos is a species of salamander in the family Salamandridae from Guangdong and Guangxi in southern China.
