= Paramesotriton longliensis =

Scientific classification
- Domain: Eukaryota
- Kingdom: Animalia
- Phylum: Chordata
- Class: Amphibia
- Order: Urodela
- Family: Salamandridae
- Genus: Paramesotriton
- Species: P. longliensis

Binomial name
- Paramesotriton longliensis Li, Tian, Gu and Xiong, 2008

Species of salamander

Paramesotriton longliensis is a species of salamander in the family Salamandridae from southern China. Its type locality is Shuichang (水场乡), Longli County, Guizhou. Specimens from southeastern Chongqing may also belong to this species.
