= Spot-tailed warty newt =

Conservation status
- Near Threatened (IUCN 3.1)

Scientific classification
- Kingdom: Animalia
- Phylum: Chordata
- Class: Amphibia
- Order: Urodela
- Family: Salamandridae
- Genus: Paramesotriton
- Species: P. caudopunctatus

Binomial name
- Paramesotriton caudopunctatus Liu & Hu, 1973

Species of salamander

The spot-tailed warty newt (Paramesotriton caudopunctatus) is a species of salamander in the family Salamandridae only found in central China. Its natural habitats are subtropical or tropical moist lowland forests and rivers. It is threatened by habitat loss. Female spot-tailed warty newts reach a total length of 155 mm (6.1 in), males are slightly shorter.
