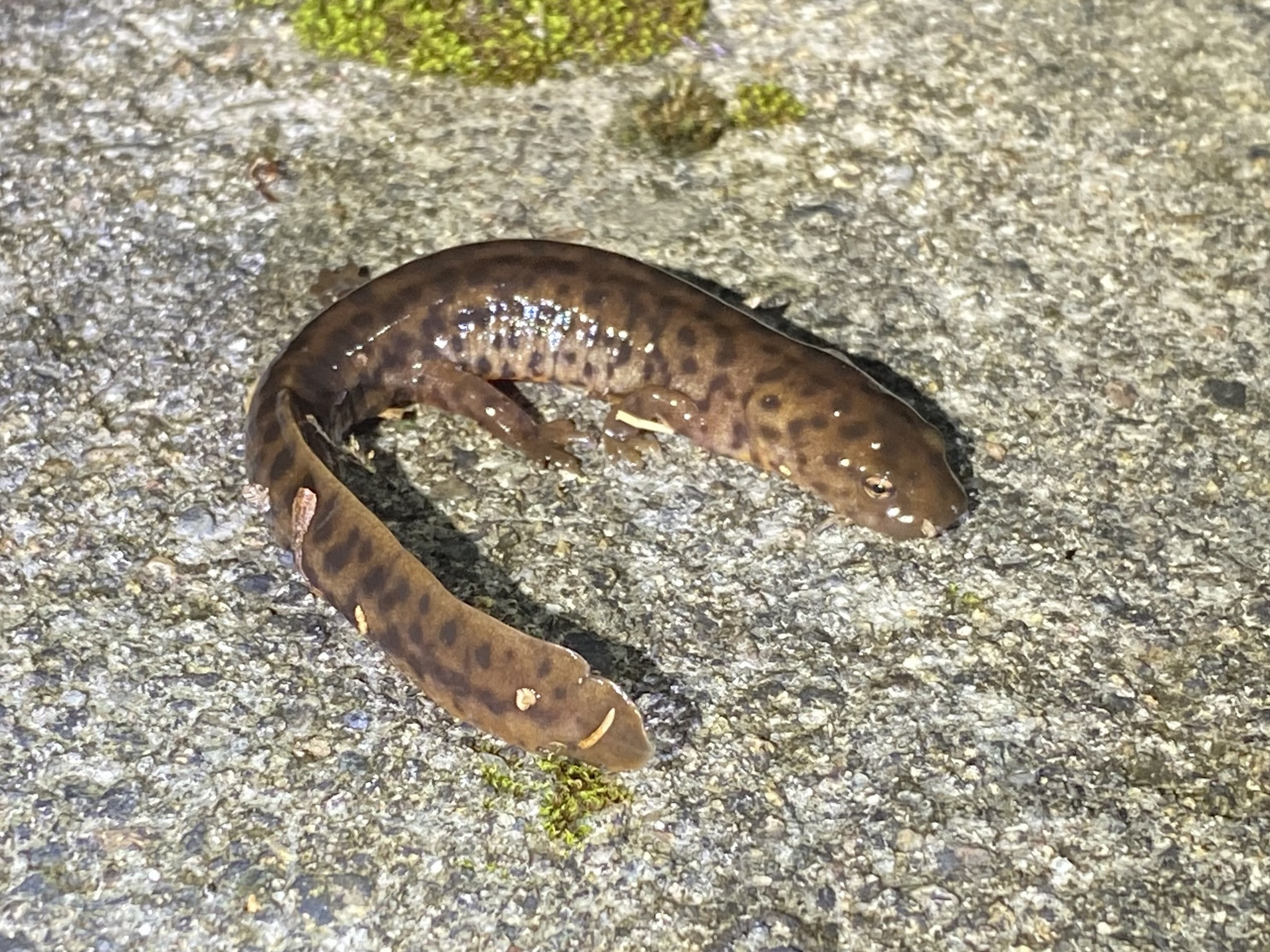
- Pachytriton brevipes

Conservation status
- Least Concern (IUCN 3.1)

Scientific classification
- Kingdom: Animalia
- Phylum: Chordata
- Class: Amphibia
- Order: Urodela
- Family: Salamandridae
- Genus: Pachytriton
- Species: P. brevipes

Binomial name
- Pachytriton brevipes (Sauvage, 1876)

Synonyms
- Cynops chinensis David, 1875 —homonym of Cynops chinensis Günther, 1859; Triton brevipes Sauvage, 1876 —replacement name

= Spotted paddle-tail newt =

Species of amphibian

The spotted paddle-tail newt (Pachytriton brevipes) is an amphibian native to southeastern China; it was named in 1876. A member of the family Salamandridae, it is closely related to the spotless paddle-tail newt (Pachytriton labiatus). The spotted paddle-tail newt lives in streams and is characterized by its long, paddle-shaped tail used for propulsion.

== Description ==
Pachytriton species are stout-bodied, smooth-skinned aquatic newts. Their heads are large and flattened, and they have conspicuous labial folds and short, stubby legs and toes. They breathe through both lungs and skin. P. brevipes ranges from 5.5 to 7.5 in as an adult. It has prominent labial folds, long digits, and smooth skin, which differs from the tuberculate skin typical of newts.

The head, back, and tail of P. brevipes range in color from light brown to a dark chocolate brown and are covered in dark spots. The underbelly color varies considerably, from a very light brown to a solid black. Breeding males may develop bluish-white spots on the tail.

== Behavior ==
Pachytriton spp. are known for their aggressive and territorial behavior, seen mainly in males, but occasionally in females, as well. P. brevipes is an aggressive hunter and feeder. It is carnivorous and will eat worms, insects, and small fish. The breeding behavior of P. brevipes is unknown.

== Ecology ==
Pachytriton brevipes is native to the freshwater streams of southeastern China, and it thrives in cool, clean water high in oxygen. Current distribution is shrinking, most likely due to pollution and human encroachment on habitat. It is almost exclusively aquatic, though it will leave the water if bullied by a more aggressive individual.
