= Puji Temple (Ningxiang) =

Buddhist temple in Hunan, China

- 普济寺
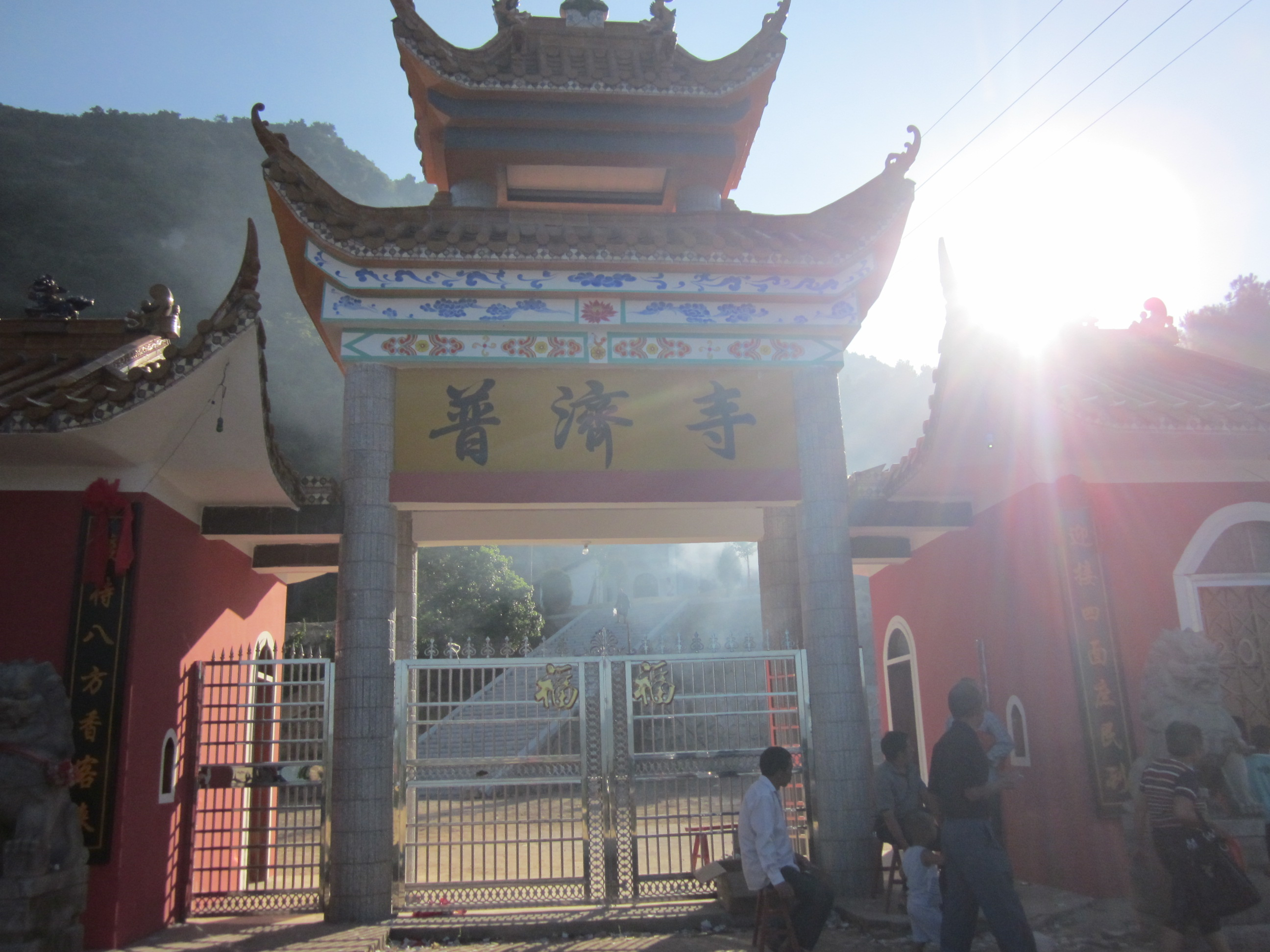
- The entrance.

- Location in Hunan.

Religion
- Affiliation: Buddhism
- Sect: Chan
- Deity: Gautama Buddha; Guanyin; Buddha Qing'an; Jade Emperor etc.

Location
- Location: Qingshanqiao Town, Ningxiang City, Hunan
- Country: China
- Interactive map of Puji Temple
- Coordinates: 28°00′26″N 112°01′49″E

Architecture
- Founder: Unknown
- Completed: Yuan dynasty (1271–1368)

Puji Temple (simplified Chinese: 普济寺; traditional Chinese: 普濟寺; pinyin: Pǔjì Sì) is a Buddhist temple located on Furong Mountain in Ningxiang City, Hunan province, China.

== History ==
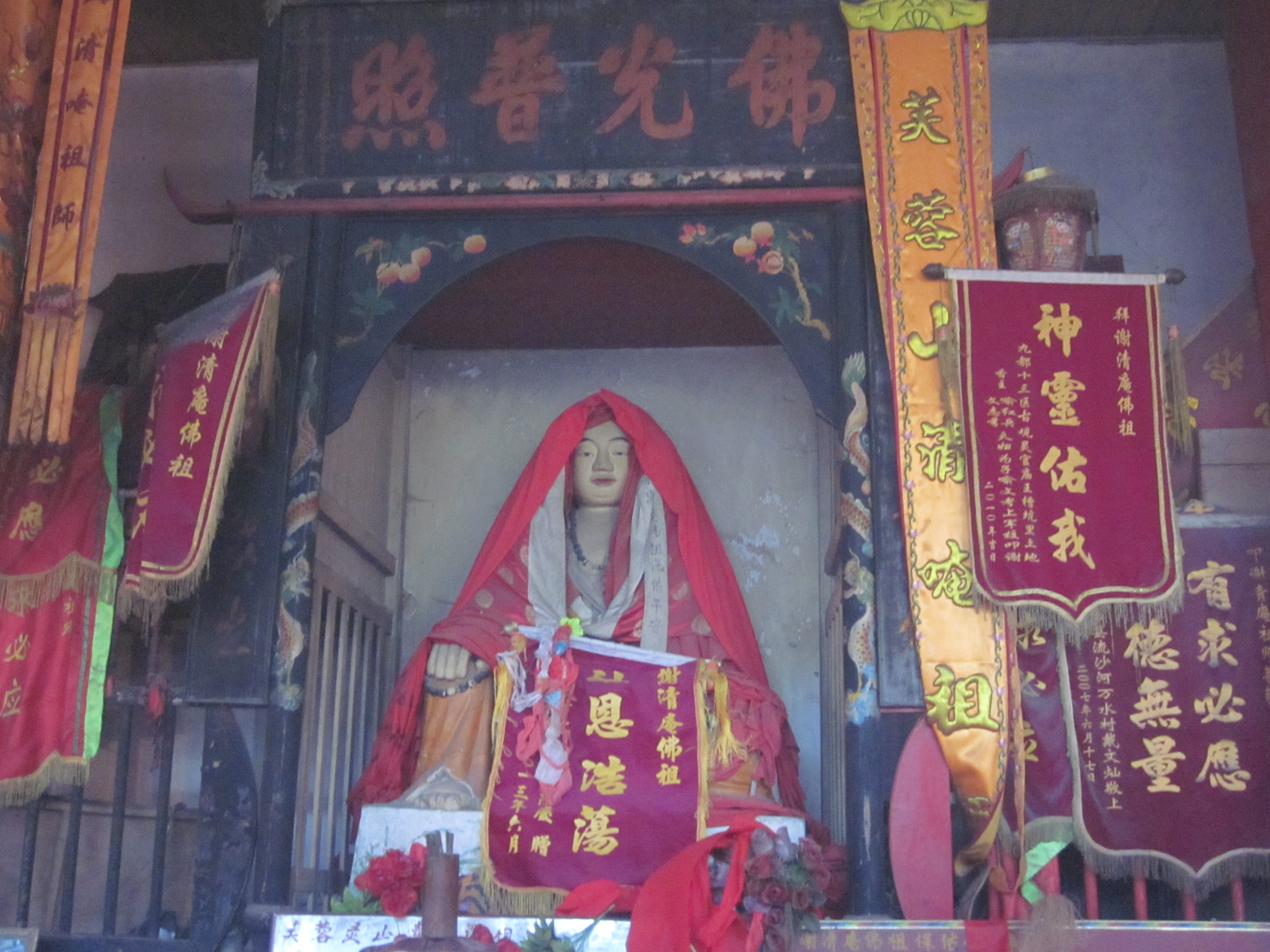
Buddha Qing'an.

It was established in the Yuan dynasty (1271–1368), at the time it was called Furong Temple (芙蓉庵).

During the Ming dynasty (1368–1644), it was made up of granite. In 1413, in the eleventh year of the age of Yongle (1403–1424) of Yongle Emperor (1360–1424), Yongle Emperor named it "Puji Temple" (普济寺).

In modern times, the temple fell into disrepair due to war. In the 21st century, the government of Qingshanqiao Town rebuilt the temple.
