= Longtian, Ningxiang =

Longtian Town 龙田镇
- Town
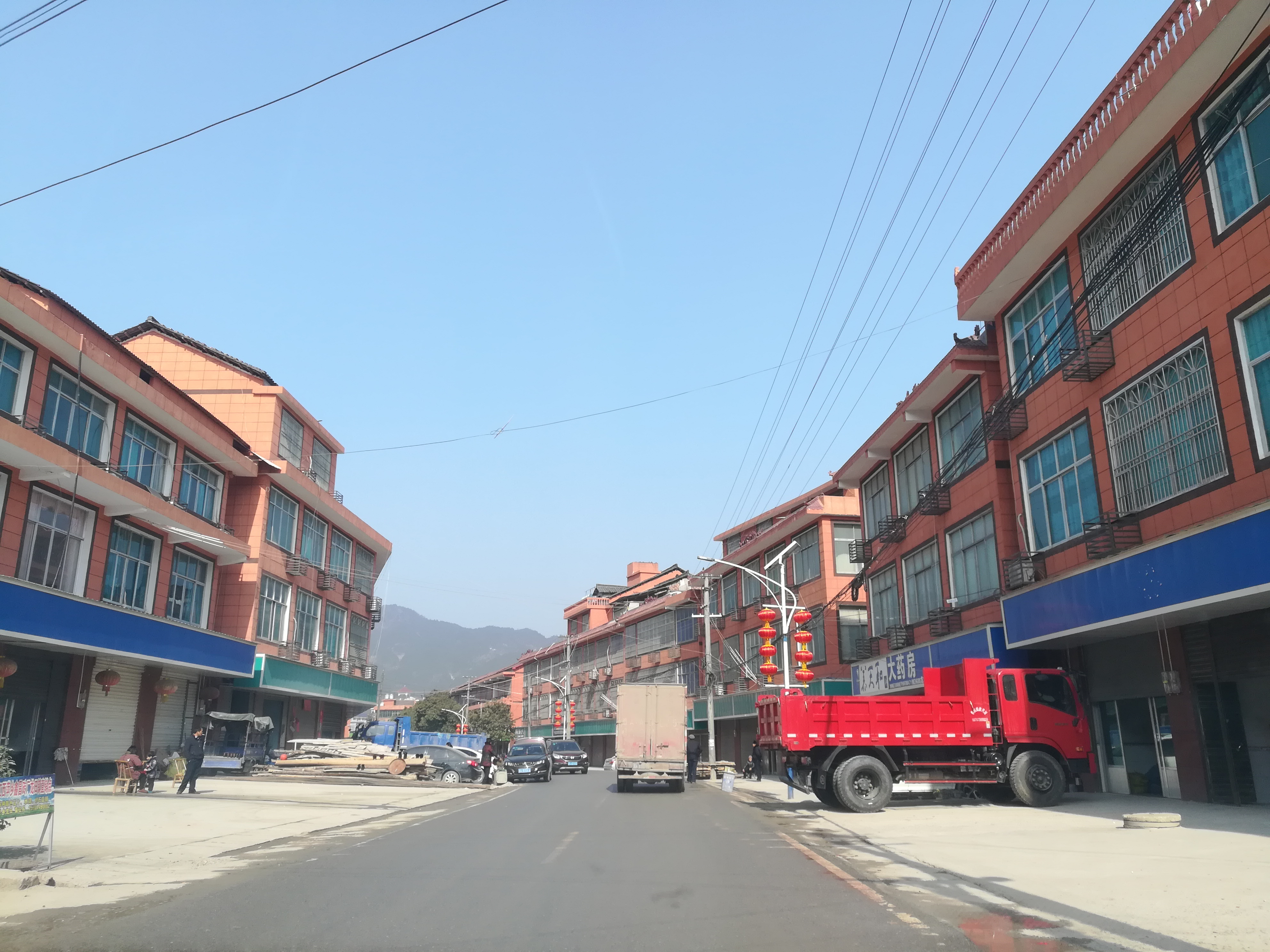
- Residential buildings in Longtian

- Location in Hunan
- Coordinates: 28°01′07″N 111°56′43″E
- Country: People's Republic of China
- Province: Hunan
- Prefecture-level city: Changsha
- County-level city: Ningxiang

Area
  - Total: 72.5 km^{2} (28.0 sq mi)
- Elevation: 571 m (1,873 ft)

Population
  - Total: 21,000
  - Density: 290/km^{2} (750/sq mi)
- Time zone: UTC+08:00 (China Standard)
- Postal code: 410629
- Area code: 0731
- Website: www.nxcity.gov.cn/ntz/index.htm

Chinese name
- Traditional Chinese: 龍田鎮
- Simplified Chinese: 龙田镇
Transcriptions
Standard Mandarin
- Hanyu Pinyin: Lóngtián Zhèn

Longtian (Chinese: 龙田镇) is a town in Ningxiang City, Hunan Province, China. It is surrounded by Gaoming Township on the west, Xiangzikou Town on the north, Qingshanqiao Town and Shatian Township on the east, and Qixingjie Town on the south. As of the 2000 census it had a population of 21,805 and an area of 72.5 square kilometres (28.0 sq mi).

== Administrative divisions ==
The town is divided into five villages and one community, which include the following areas:

- Longtian Community (龙田社区)
- Yuetang (月塘村)
- Baihua (白花村)
- Qilishan (七里山村)
- Hengling (横岭村)
- Shiwu (石屋村)

== Geography ==
Longtan is a mountainous town with an average elevation of 571 metres (1,873 ft) and a forest coverage rate of 82.6%. There are cherry blossoms in its mountains.

== Economy ==
The region abounds with manganese.

== Culture ==
Huaguxi is the most influential local theater.

== Transportation ==
The Provincial Highway S311 (311省道) runs southeast to northwest through Qingshanqiao Town and Gaoming Township.

The County Road X104 runs northeast to southwest through the towns of Xiangzikou, Qixingjie and Shatian Township.
