= Paramesotriton maolanensis =

Conservation status
- Data Deficient (IUCN 3.1)

Scientific classification
- Kingdom: Animalia
- Phylum: Chordata
- Class: Amphibia
- Order: Urodela
- Family: Salamandridae
- Genus: Paramesotriton
- Species: P. maolanensis

Binomial name
- Paramesotriton maolanensis Gu, Chen, Tian, Li, and Ran, 2012

Species of salamander

Paramesotriton maolanensis, also known as the Maolan warty newt, is a species of salamander in the family Salamandridae. It is known only from Maolan National Nature Reserve in Libo County, southern Guizhou, China. It is a relatively large member of its genus, reaching a total length of about 21 cm (8.3 in). All know specimens were collected from a deep pool, but the species probably lives in underground rivers too, that is, it is stygobitic.

== Description ==
Adult males in the type series (three specimens) measure 90–99 mm (3.5–3.9 in) in snout–vent length and 177–192 mm (7.0–7.6 in) in total length. Adult females in the type series (two specimens only) measure 113–117 mm (4.4–4.6 in) in snout–vent length and 197–208 mm (7.8–8.2 in) in total length; at the time of description, it was the largest member of its genus. The eyes are reduced, possibly not functional in image forming. The head is elongated with a short, truncated snout. Skin is relatively smooth. The body is dorsally brown-black. There is a tubercular dorsal ridge that has non-continuous yellow mottling. The venter has large, irregular orange-red spots.

== Habitat and conservation ==
The type series was collected from a large, deep pool surrounded by lush vegetation. The pool is located at 817 m (2,680 ft) above sea level in a karst landscape. The pool is fed by two surface streams, but it is probably drained by an underground stream that keeps the water level constant. Reduced eyes of this species suggest that it lives in the underground streams.

The type locality is within a national nature reserve. Despite further surveys, this species has not been observed after its description. Threats to it are unknown. It has been assessed as "data deficient" on the IUCN Red List of Threatened Species.

Paramesotriton maolanensis is only known from the Maolan National Nature Reserve in Guizhou, China
