= Wanggao warty newt =

Conservation status
- Vulnerable (IUCN 3.1)

Scientific classification
- Kingdom: Animalia
- Phylum: Chordata
- Class: Amphibia
- Order: Urodela
- Family: Salamandridae
- Genus: Paramesotriton
- Species: P. fuzhongensis

Binomial name
- Paramesotriton fuzhongensis Wen, 1989

Species of salamander

The Wanggao warty newt (Paramesotriton fuzhongensis) is a species of salamander in the family Salamandridae found only in northeastern Guangxi, China, in Zhongshan, Fuchuan and Gongcheng counties. Its natural habitats are subtropical or tropical moist lowland forests, subtropical or tropical seasonally wet or flooded lowland grassland, and rivers. It is threatened by habitat loss.
