= Pachytriton archospotus =

Scientific classification
- Domain: Eukaryota
- Kingdom: Animalia
- Phylum: Chordata
- Class: Amphibia
- Order: Urodela
- Family: Salamandridae
- Genus: Pachytriton
- Species: P. archospotus

Binomial name
- Pachytriton archospotus Shen, Shen, and Mo, 2008

Species of salamander

Pachytriton archospotus is a species of salamander in the family Salamandridae endemic to southern China. It is found in Hunan, Jiangxi, and Guangdong provinces.
