= Pachytriton wuguanfui =

Conservation status
- Endangered (IUCN 3.1)

Scientific classification
- Kingdom: Animalia
- Phylum: Chordata
- Class: Amphibia
- Order: Urodela
- Family: Salamandridae
- Genus: Pachytriton
- Species: P. wuguanfui

Binomial name
- Pachytriton wuguanfui Yuan, Zhang, and Che, 2016

Species of salamander

Pachytriton wuguanfui is a species of salamander in the family Salamandridae from Hunan and Guangxi in southern China that was discovered in 2016. The species inhabits cold montane streams within broadleaf forests.

== Morphology ==
The dorsal side is dark brown and the ventral side is brown with blotches of orange. The underside of limbs, the tail, and the cloaca is orange. Organisms have smooth skin with prominent paratoid glands, and a head that is flat and oval-shaped. They have short limbs and digits are slightly webbed.

Sexual dimorphism has not been fully studied yet, but males have a larger cloaca with females that also contain papillae on its walls.

== Etymology ==
The species' scientific name stems from the herpetologist Guanfu Wu, to honor his contributions to science.

== Pathogens ==
An individual of this species was found to be infected with Bsal, meaning that they are susceptible to the pathogen and could put the future fate of the species in jeopardy.
