= Yunwu Mountain =

Mountain in Hunan, China

- 云雾山
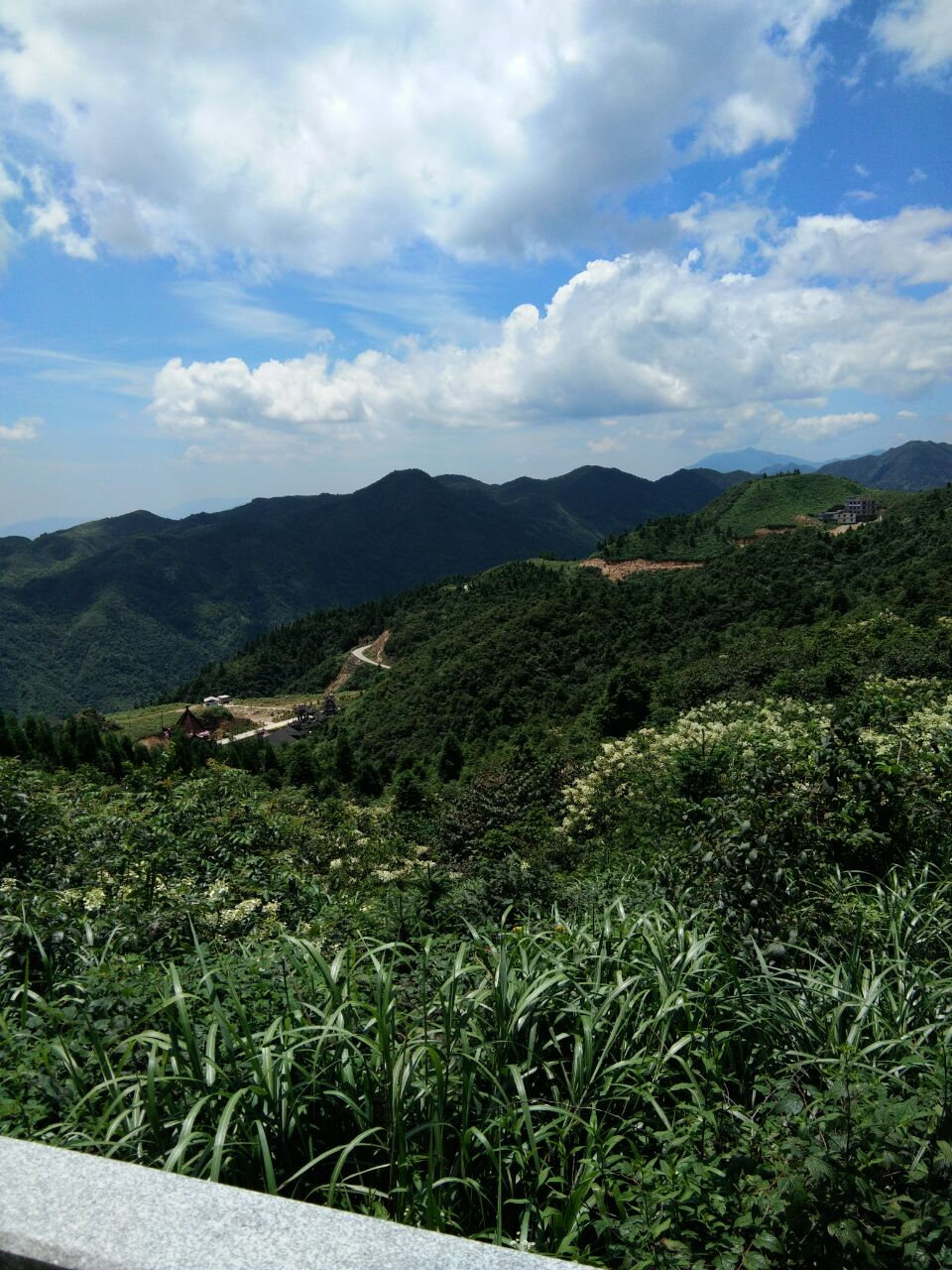
- Yunwu Mountain

Highest point
- Peak: Chaoyang Temple
- Elevation: 983 m (3,225 ft)
- Coordinates: 26°13′9.9876″N 110°16′4.855″E

Geography
- Location within Hunan
- Country: China
- Province: Hunan
- Parent range: Xuefeng Mountains

Geology
- Rock type: Granite

Yunwu Mountain (simplified Chinese: 云雾山; traditional Chinese: 雲霧山; pinyin: Yúnwùshān), also known as The Cloud and Mist Mountain, is a mountain located in Shaoyang, Hunan, China, with a height of 983 metres (3,225 ft) above sea level. It is a part of Xuefeng Mountains.

Yunwu Mountain is noted for Buddhist temples, such as Yunwu Temple (云雾寺), Chaoyang Temple (朝阳庵) and Baoding Temple (宝鼎庵).
