= Wu River (Wei River tributary) =

River in China

Coordinates: 28°11′07″N 112°32′24″E

Wu River (simplified Chinese: 乌江; traditional Chinese: 烏江; pinyin: Wūjiāng), originates in Xiangxiang City, is 40 kilometres (25 mi) long, and drains a basin of 385 square kilometres (149 mi^{2}). It is the fourth largest river in Ningxiang City and one of the largest tributaries of the Wei River.

Wu River has 68 tributaries. The river passes places such as Huitang Town, Xieleqiao Town, Zifu Town, Nantianping Town, Batang Town, and Lijingpu Township, and empties into the Wei River in Nantai Lake (南太湖).
