= Pachytriton feii =

Conservation status
- Vulnerable (IUCN 3.1)

Scientific classification
- Kingdom: Animalia
- Phylum: Chordata
- Class: Amphibia
- Order: Urodela
- Family: Salamandridae
- Genus: Pachytriton
- Species: P. feii

Binomial name
- Pachytriton feii Nishikawa, Jiang, and Matsui, 2011

Species of salamander

Pachytriton feii is a species of salamander in the family Salamandridae from the Huangshan Mountains of Anhui, and southeastern Henan, China.
