= Fusi Mountain =

Mountain in Hunan, China

- 猴子峰
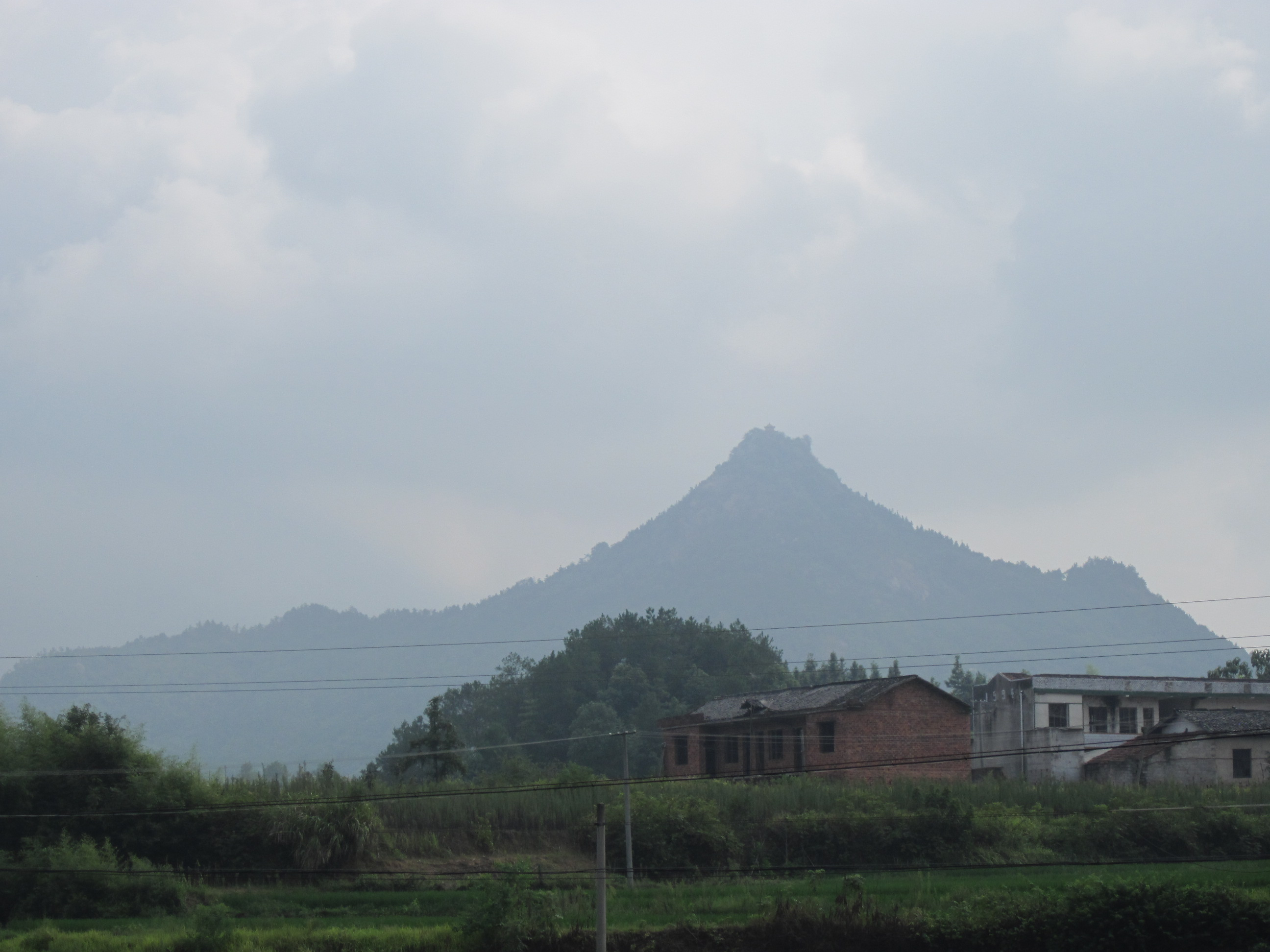
- Fusi Mountain

Highest point
- Peak: Jinfeng Temple
- Elevation: 410 m (1,350 ft)
- Coordinates: 28°01′56″N 112°08′13″E

Geography
- Location within Hunan
- Country: China
- Province: Hunan
- Parent range: Xuefeng Mountains

Geology
- Rock type: Granite

Fusi Mountain (Chinese: 罘罳峰; pinyin: Fú Sī Fēng) is located in the southwestern part of Ningxiang County in central Hunan Province. It is a part of Xuefeng Mountains.

The highest point of the mountain, the Jinfeng Temple, measures 410 metres (1,345 ft) in height. It is located in the center part of the mountain.

== Cultural sites ==
Jinfeng Temple is a Buddhist temple that was built in the Tang dynasty to worship Guanyin and the Jade Emperor.
