= Pachytriton changi =

Scientific classification
- Kingdom: Animalia
- Phylum: Chordata
- Class: Amphibia
- Order: Urodela
- Family: Salamandridae
- Genus: Pachytriton
- Species: P. changi

Binomial name
- Pachytriton changi Nishikawa, Matsui, and Jiang, 2012

Species of salamander

Pachytriton changi is a species of salamander in the family Salamandridae from Guangdong, China.
