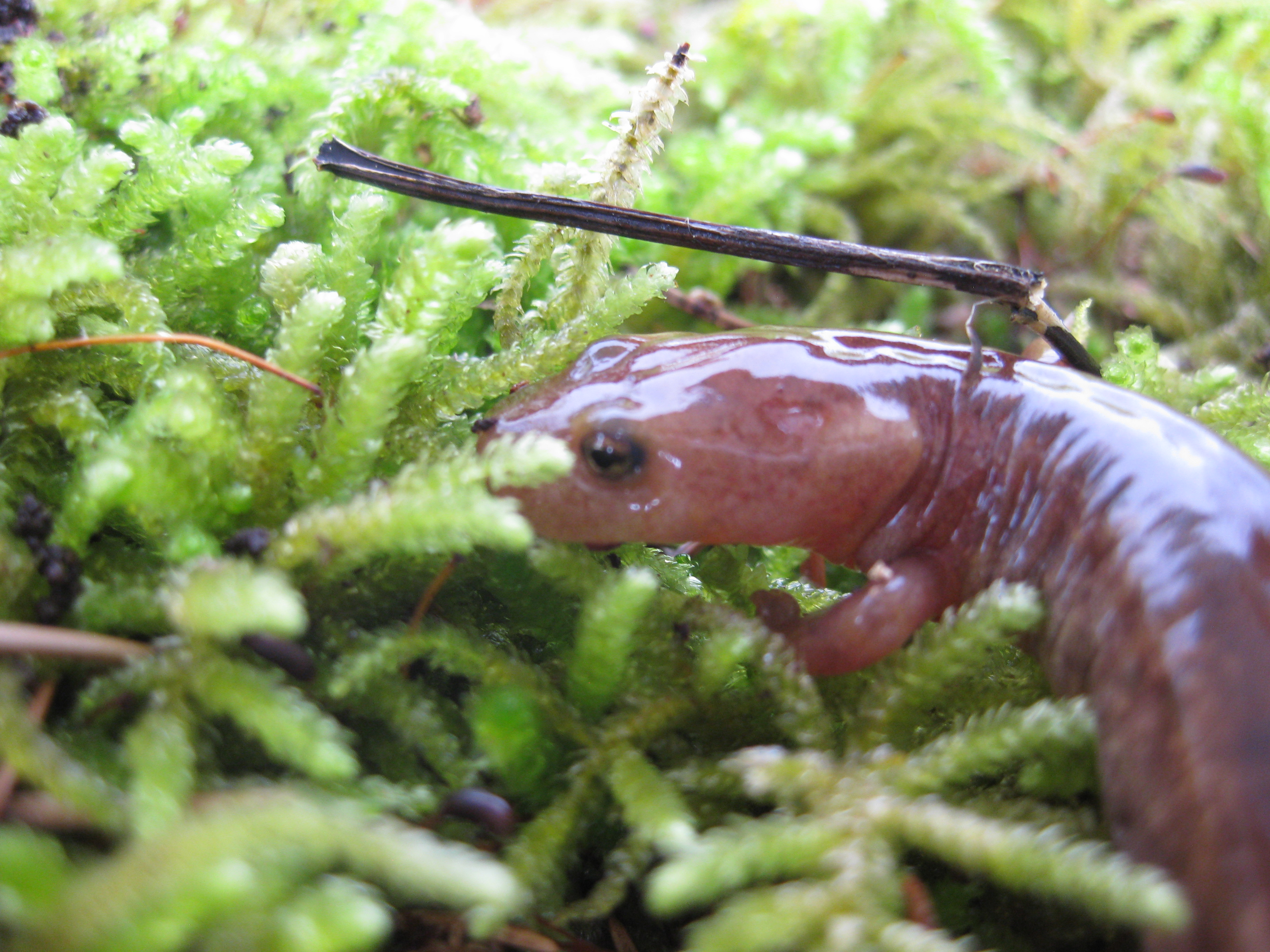

Scientific classification
- Kingdom: Animalia
- Phylum: Chordata
- Class: Amphibia
- Order: Urodela
- Family: Salamandridae
- Subfamily: Pleurodelinae
- Genus: Pachytriton; Boulenger, 1879

Type species
- Triton brevipes Sauvage, 1877

Synonyms
- Pingia Chang, 1935

= Pachytriton =

Genus of amphibians

Pachytriton, also known as the paddle-tail newts or Chinese newts, is a genus of salamanders in the family Salamandridae. They are found in southeastern China.

== Species ==
There are ten species:

Image	Scientific name	Distribution
	Pachytriton airobranchiatus Li, Yuan, Li, and Wu, 2018	Guangdong, China
	Pachytriton archospotus Shen, Shen, and Mo, 2008	Hunan, Jiangxi, and Guangdong, China
	Pachytriton brevipes (Sauvage, 1876) — spotted paddle-tail newt	southeastern China
	Pachytriton changi Nishikawa, Matsui, and Jiang, 2012	Guangdong, China
	Pachytriton cheni (He, 2025)	Anhui, China
	Pachytriton feii Nishikawa, Jiang, and Matsui, 2011	Anhui, and southeastern Henan, China
	Pachytriton granulosus Chang, 1933	Zhejiang, China
	Pachytriton inexpectatus Nishikawa, Jiang, Matsui, and Mo, 2011	Guizhou, Hunan, Guangdong, and Guangxi provinces
	Pachytriton moi Nishikawa, Jiang, and Matsui, 2011	Guangxi, China
	Pachytriton wuguanfui Yuan, Zhang, and Che, 2016	Hunan and Guangxi in southern China
	Pachytriton xanthospilos Wu, Wang, and Hanken, 2012	Guangdong and Guangxi in southern China
