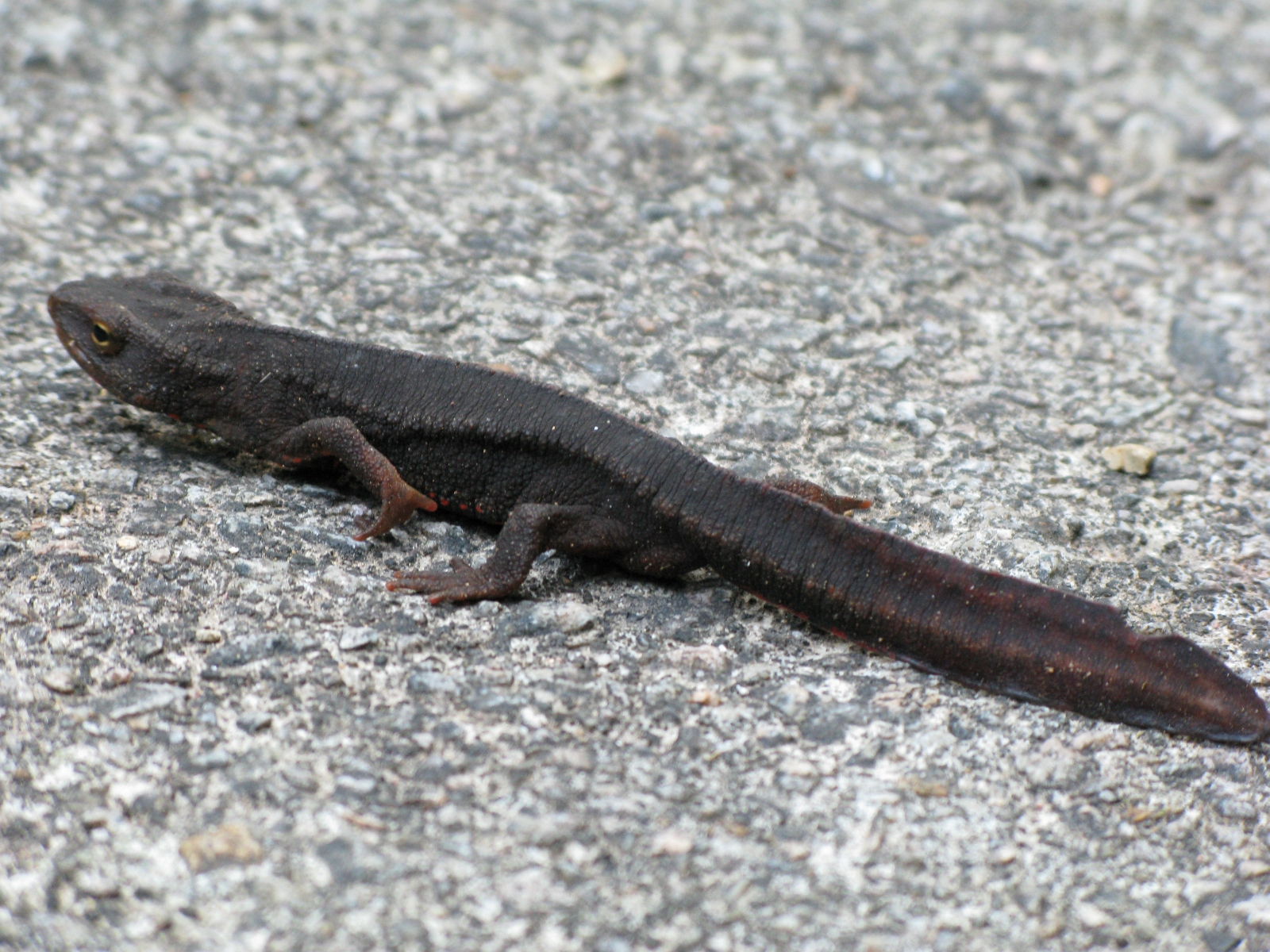
- Paramesotriton hongkongensis

Scientific classification
- Kingdom: Animalia
- Phylum: Chordata
- Class: Amphibia
- Order: Urodela
- Family: Salamandridae
- Subfamily: Pleurodelinae
- Genus: Paramesotriton; Chang, 1935

Type species
- Mesotriton deloustali Bourret, 1934

Species
- 14 species (see text)

Synonyms
- Mesotriton Bourret, 1934 — preoccupied by Mesotriton Bolkay, 1927; Trituroides Chang, 1935; Allomesotriton Freytag, 1983; Karstotriton Fei and Ye, 2016

= Paramesotriton =

Genus of amphibians

Paramesotriton, also known as warty newts or Asian warty newts, is a genus of salamanders in the family Salamandridae. The genus is found in southwestern and southern China and in northern Vietnam. Most of the species are endemic to China, and the majority of them have been described recently, since 2008. The genus includes both pond and stream dwellers.

== Taxonomy and systematics ==
The sister taxon of Paramesotriton is Laotriton. The genus may be divided into two species groups (subgenera), Paramesotriton and Allomesotriton.

== Description ==
Paramesotriton have a dark brown dorsum with a prominent vertebral ridge, often also a pair of lateral ridges. The tail is high and laterally compressed. Skin texture varies from relatively smooth to very rough. Paramesotriton hongkongensis has toxic skin and ova, as has been shown for many other salamanders.

== Species ==
Paramesotriton contains the following 14 species:

- Paramesotriton aurantius Yuan, Wu, Zhou, and Che, 2016
- Paramesotriton caudopunctatus (Liu and Hu, 1973) — spot-tailed warty newt
- Paramesotriton chinensis (Gray, 1859) — Chinese warty newt
- Paramesotriton deloustali (Bourret, 1934) — Tam Dao salamander, Vietnamese salamander
- Paramesotriton fuzhongensis Wen, 1989 — Wanggao warty newt
- Paramesotriton guangxiensis (Huang, Tang, and Tang, 1983) — Guangxi warty newt
- Paramesotriton hongkongensis (Myers and Leviton, 1962) — Hong Kong warty newt, Hong Kong newt
- Paramesotriton labiatus (Unterstein, 1930)
- Paramesotriton longliensis Li, Tian, Gu, and Xiong, 2008
- Paramesotriton maolanensis Gu, Chen, Tian, Li, and Ran, 2012
- Paramesotriton qixilingensis Yan, Zhao, Jiang, Hou, He, Murphy, and Che, 2014
- Paramesotriton wulingensis Wang, Tian, and Gu, 2013
- Paramesotriton yunwuensis Wu, Jiang, and Hanken, 2010
- Paramesotriton zhijinensis Li, Tian, and Gu, 2008 — Zhijin warty newt

== Intrinsic Phylogeny ==
- - - Paramesotriton caudopunctatus
    - Paramesotriton zhijinensis
  - - Paramesotriton chinensis
    - - Paramesotriton hongkongensis
      - - Paramesotriton deloustali
        - - Paramesotriton fuzhongensis
          - Paramesotriton guangxiensis

Intrinsic phylogeny tree of genus Paramesotriton.
