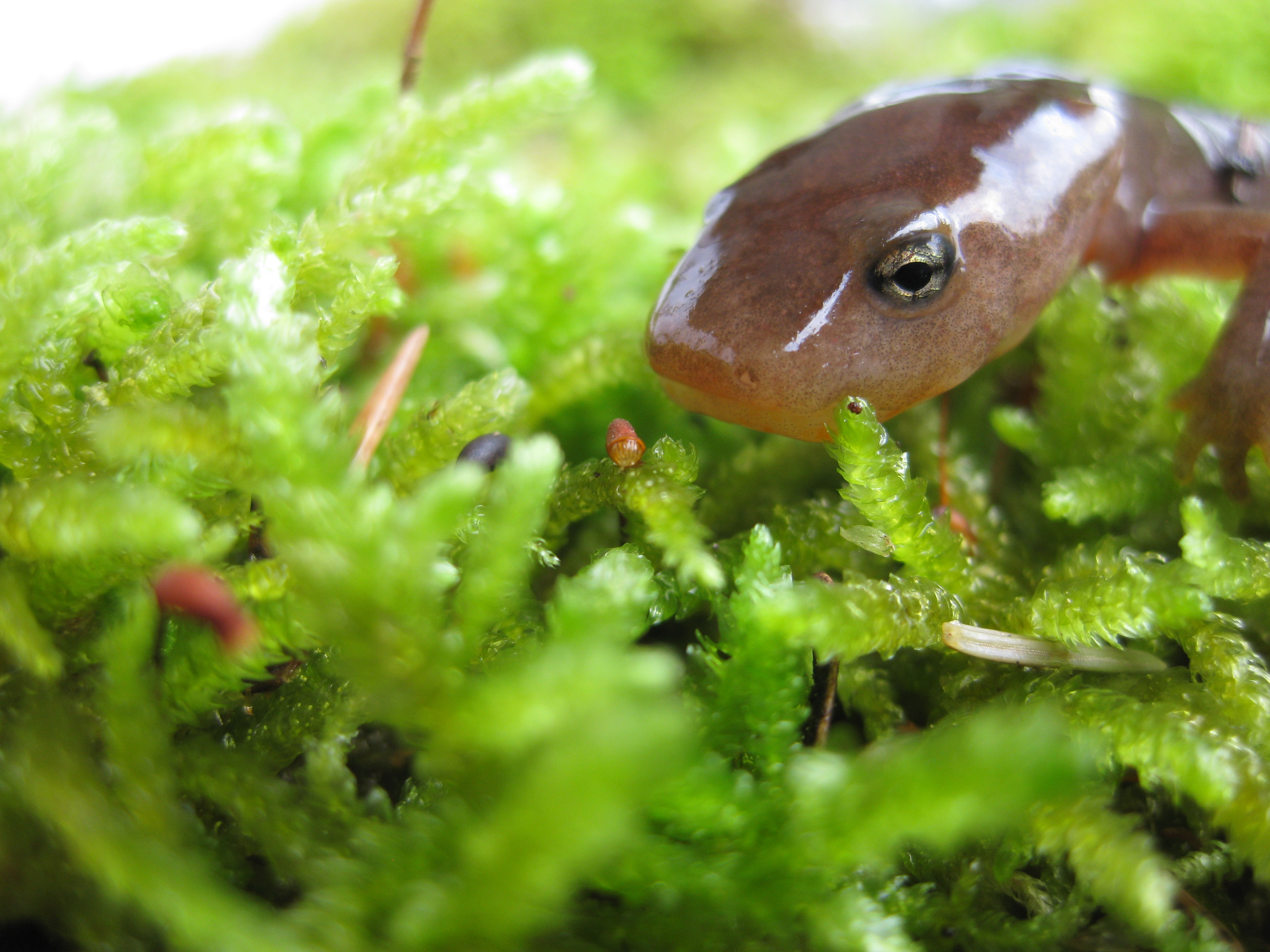
- Pachytriton granulosus

Scientific classification
- Domain: Eukaryota
- Kingdom: Animalia
- Phylum: Chordata
- Class: Amphibia
- Order: Urodela
- Family: Salamandridae
- Genus: Pachytriton
- Species: P. granulosus

Binomial name
- Pachytriton granulosus Chang, 1933

= Pachytriton granulosus =

Species of salamander

Pachytriton granulosus is a species of salamander in the family Salamandridae endemic to the mountains of Zhejiang, China.
