= Paramesotriton guangxiensis =

Conservation status
- Vulnerable (IUCN 3.1)

Scientific classification
- Kingdom: Animalia
- Phylum: Chordata
- Class: Amphibia
- Order: Urodela
- Family: Salamandridae
- Genus: Paramesotriton
- Species: P. guangxiensis

Binomial name
- Paramesotriton guangxiensis (Huang, Tang & Tang, 1983)

Synonyms
- Trituroides guanxiensis Huang, Tang & Tang, 1983; Paramesotriton guanxiensis (incorrect spelling)

Species of salamander

Paramesotriton guangxiensis, the Guangxi warty newt, is a species of salamander in the family Salamandridae. It is found only in China: it is only known from Paiyangshan, Ningming County, in Guangxi Province. Its natural habitats are subtropical or tropical moist lowland forests and rivers. It is threatened by habitat loss.

Female Guangxi warty newts reach a total length of 134 mm (5.3 in), males are slightly longer.
