= Wei River (Xiang tributary) =

River in Hunan, China

Coordinates: 28°23′17″N 112°48′26″E

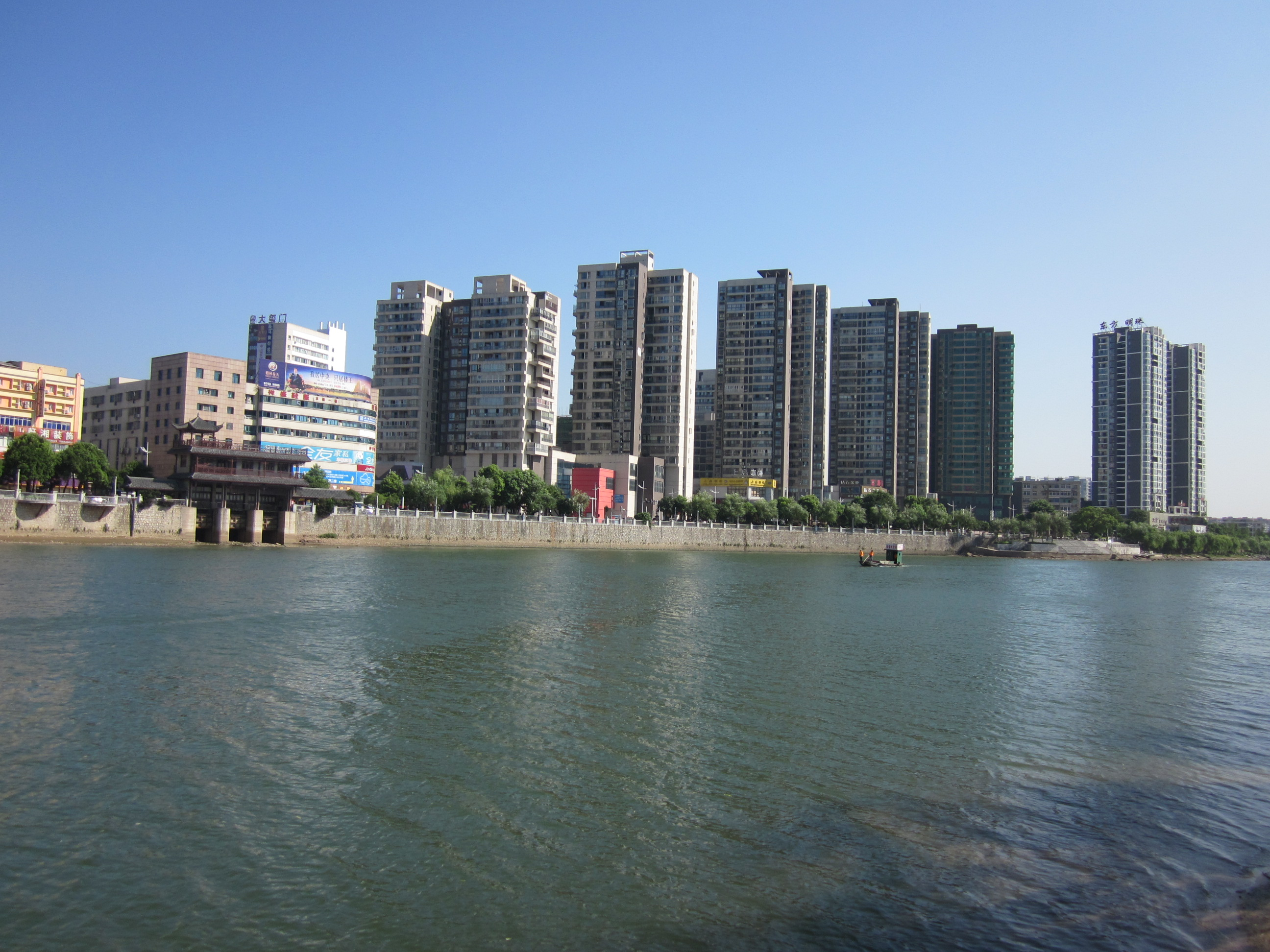
- Picture of Wei River in downtown Ningxiang City.

- Location on Hunan.
- Native name: 沩水河 (Chinese)

Physical characteristics
- Source: Weishan Township
  - location: Ningxiang, Hunan
- Mouth: Xiang River
- Length: 117.2 km (72.8 mi)
- Basin size: 2,125 km^{2} (820 mi^{2})

Basin features
- Waterbodies: Tianping Reservoir; Huangcai Reservoir

The Wei or Weishui River (simplified Chinese: 沩水河; traditional Chinese: 溈水河; pinyin: Wéishuǐ Hé), begins in Weishan Township, is 117.2 kilometres (72.8 mi) long, and has a drainage basin of 2,125 square kilometres (820 mi^{2}). It is the largest river in Ningxiang City and one of the largest tributaries of the Xiang River.

Wei River's main tributaries include Huangjuan River (黄涓水), Duan River (塅溪), Mei River (梅溪), Tiechong River (铁冲河), Yutang River (玉堂水), Chu River and Wu River. The river passes places such as Huangcai Town, Hengshi Town, Shuangfupu Town, Dachengqiao Town, Batang Town, Huilongpu Town, Baimaqiao Township, Yutan Town, Lijingpu Township, and Shuangjiangkou Town, and empties into the Xiang River in Wangcheng District.
