= Gaoming, Anhua =

Gaoming Township 高明乡
- Township
- Location in Hunan
- Coordinates: 28°04′11″N 111°51′54″E
- Country: People's Republic of China
- Province: Hunan
- Prefecture-level city: Yiyang
- County: Anhua County

Area
  - Total: 98 km^{2} (38 sq mi)

Population
  - Total: 18,000
  - Density: 180/km^{2} (480/sq mi)
- Time zone: UTC+8 (China Standard)
- Area code: 0737

Gaoming Township (simplified Chinese: 高明乡; traditional Chinese: 高明鄉; pinyin: Gāomíng Xiāng) is a rural township in Anhua County, Yiyang, Hunan Province, People's Republic of China.

== Administrative divisions ==
The township is divided into 12 villages, which include the following areas: Gaomingpu Village, Shiyan Village, Shilong Village, Situpu Village, Jiu'an Village, Meimao Village, Xingzhuang Village, Yinshan Village, Heinitian Village, Yitoupu Village, Qingfeng Village, and Tongjian Village (高明铺村、石岩村、适龙村、司徒铺村、久安村、眉毛村、星庄村、阴山村、黑泥田村、驿头铺村、青丰村、同建村).
