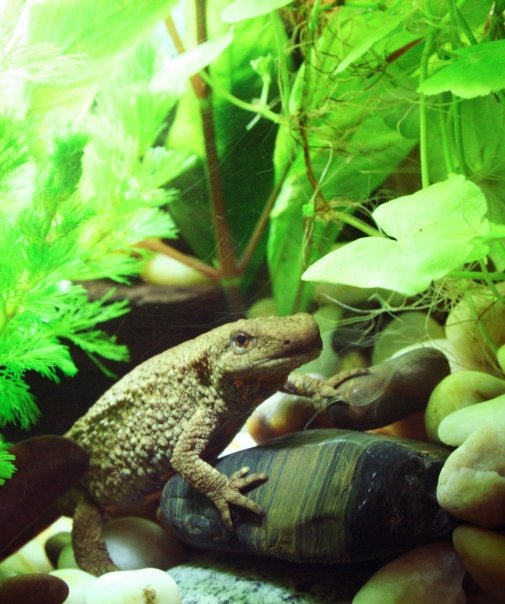

Conservation status
- Least Concern (IUCN 3.1)

Scientific classification
- Kingdom: Animalia
- Phylum: Chordata
- Class: Amphibia
- Order: Urodela
- Family: Salamandridae
- Genus: Paramesotriton
- Species: P. chinensis

Binomial name
- Paramesotriton chinensis Gray, 1859

= Chinese warty newt =

Species of salamander

The Chinese warty newt (Paramesotriton chinensis) is a species of salamander in the family Salamandridae. It is found only in China, with a range extending from Chongqing to Hunan, Anhui, Zhejiang, Fujian, Guangdong, and Guangxi Provinces in Central China. Its natural habitats are subtropical or tropical moist lowland forests, rivers, and freshwater marshes. It is not considered threatened by the IUCN. Female Chinese warty newts reach total length of 151 mm (5.9 in), males are slightly shorter.
