= Xuefeng Mountains =

Mountain range in Hunan, China

Xuefeng Range
- 雪峰山脉
- Location within China

Highest point
- Coordinates: 27°7′33″N 110°33′38″E

Geography
- Location: Hunan, China
- Parent range: Mengzhu Ridge, Nan Mountains

Geology
- Mountain type(s): Slate, quartzite and sandstone

The Xuefeng Mountains (simplified Chinese: 雪峰山脉; traditional Chinese: 雪峰山脈; pinyin: Xuěfēng Shānmài) are a mountain range of China in western Hunan province.

The Xuefeng Mountains lie in the heart of Hunan. They are an extension of the highlands in the province's west, which run northeast to southwest and form the eastern edge of the Guizhou Plateau. The composition of the mountains is mainly slate, quartzite, and sandstone. The mountains have numerous deep gorges formed by the many rivers that flow through it.

The mountains have hiking routes.
