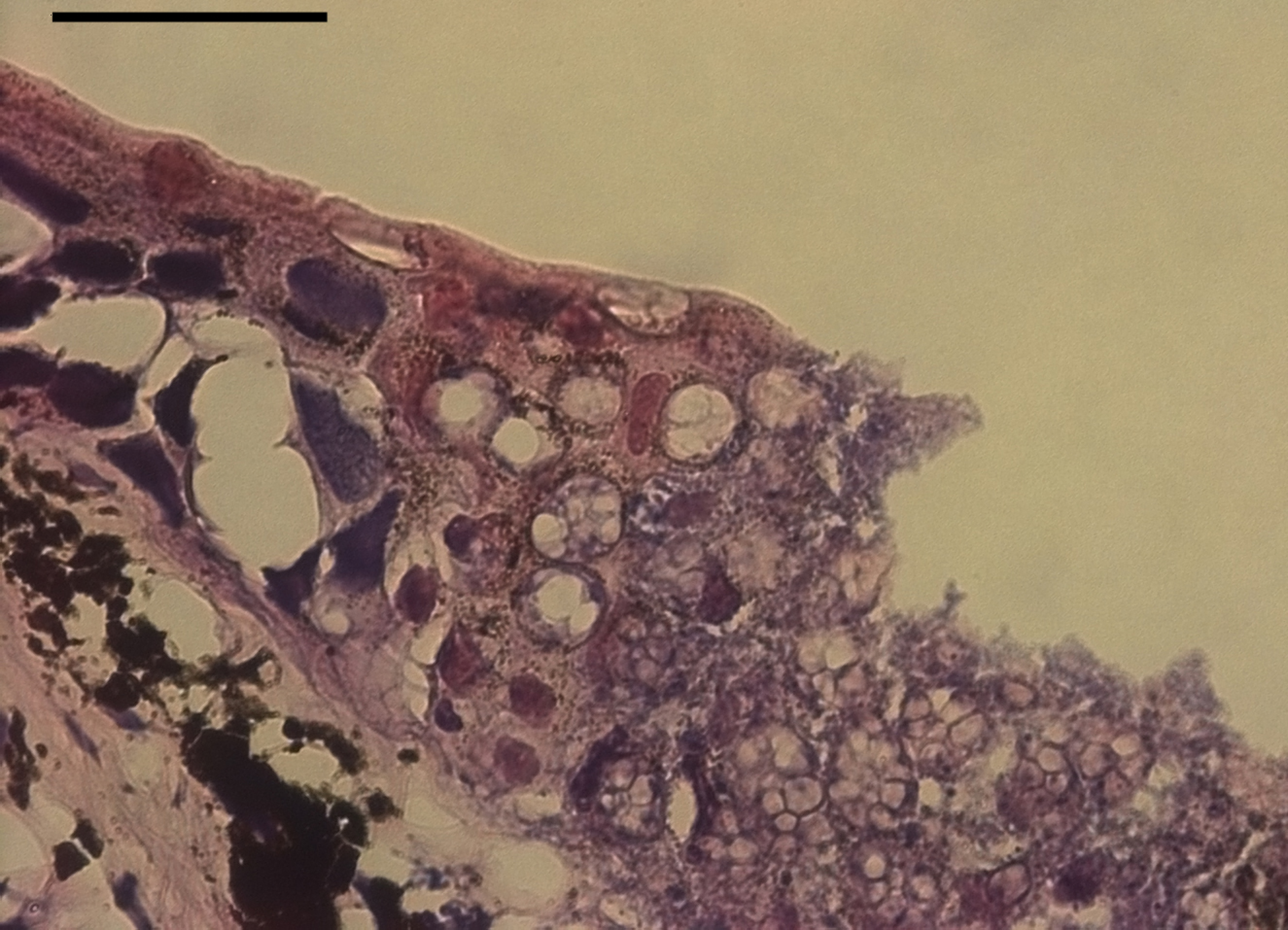
- Bsal infection in the skin of a fire salamander

Scientific classification
- Kingdom: Fungi
- Division: Chytridiomycota
- Class: Chytridiomycetes
- Order: Rhizophydiales
- Family: Batrachochytriaceae
- Genus: Batrachochytrium
- Species: B. salamandrivorans

Binomial name
- Batrachochytrium salamandrivorans Martel A., Blooi M., Bossuyt F., Pasmans F. (2013)

= Batrachochytrium salamandrivorans =

Species of pathogenic chytrid fungus that infects amphibian species

Batrachochytrium salamandrivorans (Bsal) is a pathogenic chytrid fungus that infects amphibian species. Although salamanders and newts seem to be the most susceptible, some anuran species are also affected. Bsal has emerged recently and poses a major threat to species in Europe and North America.

It was described in 2013 based on a strain collected from skin tissue of fire salamanders Salamandra salamandra. The pathogen, unidentified up to then, had devastated fire salamander populations in the Netherlands. Molecular phylogenetics confirmed it as related to the well known chytrid B. dendrobatidis. Like this species, it causes chytridiomycosis, which is manifested in skin lesions and is lethal for the salamanders. Damage to the epidermal layer can be extensive and may result in osmoregulatory issues or sepsis.

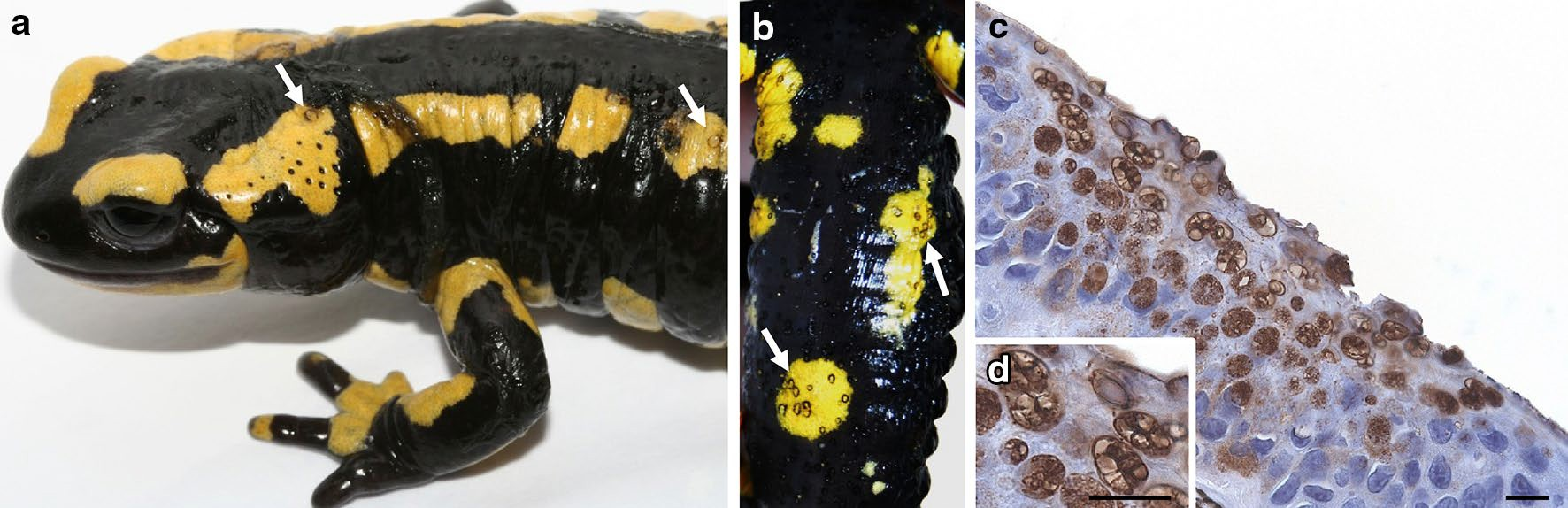
Batrachochytrium salamandrivorans, clinical signs and pathology

Another study estimated that this species had diverged from B. dendrobatidis in the Late Cretaceous or early Paleogene. While initial susceptibility testing showed frogs and caecilians seemed to be resistant to Bsal infection, it was lethal to many European and some North American salamanders. East Asian salamanders were susceptible but able to tolerate infections. The fungus was also detected in a more-than-150-year-old museum specimen of the Japanese sword-tailed newt. This suggests it had originally emerged and co-evolved with salamanders in East Asia, forming its natural reservoir, and was introduced to Europe rather recently through the trade of species such as the fire belly newts as pets. The Asian origin hypothesis for Bsal is supported by additional studies which have found Bsal in wild urodela populations in Asia and in animals of Asian origin being transported via the pet trade. Since the pathogen's initial discovery, it has been found in several additional areas across Europe in both wild and captive populations. One study was able to detect Bsal in 7 of 11 captive urodele collections.

The description of this pathogen and its aggressiveness raised concern in the scientific community and the public, fearing that it might be a rising threat to Western hemisphere salamanders. On 12 January 2016, the U.S. government issued a directive that prohibited the importation of 20 genera of salamanders in order to reduce the threat posed by B. salamandrivorans. On 10 January 2025, the U.S. government added 16 more genera of salamanders to the 2016 regulation, thus prohibiting the importation of 36 genera into the United States.

== Etymology ==
Batrachochytrium is derived from the Greek words batrachos, "frog", and chytra, "earthen pot" (describing the structure that contains unreleased zoospores); salamandrivorans is from the Greek salamandra, "salamander", and Latin vorans, "eating", which refers to extensive skin destruction and rapid death in infected salamanders.

== Distribution ==
Bsal appears to occupy a narrow climactic niche in its native range in East and Southeast Asia. In its introduced range in Europe, it was first detected in the Netherlands in 2012, where it wiped out a majority of the country's small fire salamander population. It has since naturally expanded into Belgium, western Germany, and possibly Luxembourg, although it was likely present in some of these regions well before the documented outbreaks; the oldest known record is from Germany in 2004. In Germany, it is primarily known from the states of North Rhine-Westphalia and Rhineland-Palatinate, with the core of its range being in the Eifel Mountains, where it has caused landscape-scale declines of fire salamanders. It was detected in the state of Hesse in 2024, on the border with North Rhine-Westphalia, where it was found to have caused a mass mortality of fire salamanders.

In addition to this contiguous range, several isolated outbreaks have been reported. One such outbreak is known from the Steigerwald in Bavaria, Germany, which was possibly introduced either by hitchhiking on shoes, animals, or machinery, although it is also possible that it had naturally expanded from northern Germany unnoticed. The southernmost outbreak was identified in Allgäu in 2020, which was possibly associated with an accidental introduction via aquatic plants for garden ponds; this outbreak caused a mass mortality event among alpine newts. Due to its proximity to the Alps, this outbreak poses a major risk to the alpine salamander and Lanza's alpine salamander if allowed to expand. Another outbreak was identified in a single site in Catalonia, Spain in 2018, which likely originated from released captive individuals. This outbreak caused mortality in fire salamanders and marbled newts, and posed a severe threat to the endemic salamanders of the Iberian Peninsula; the site was thus impounded to contain the outbreak and prevent any spillover. Several other reports of Bsal from other parts of Spain are thought to be false positives, as later surveys of these sites have found no presence of the disease.

== Susceptible species ==
Confirmed and potential hosts of Batrachochytrium salamandrivorans

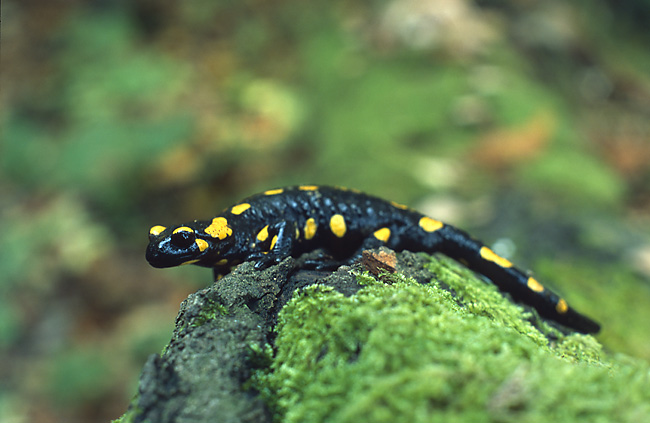
Salamandra salamandra

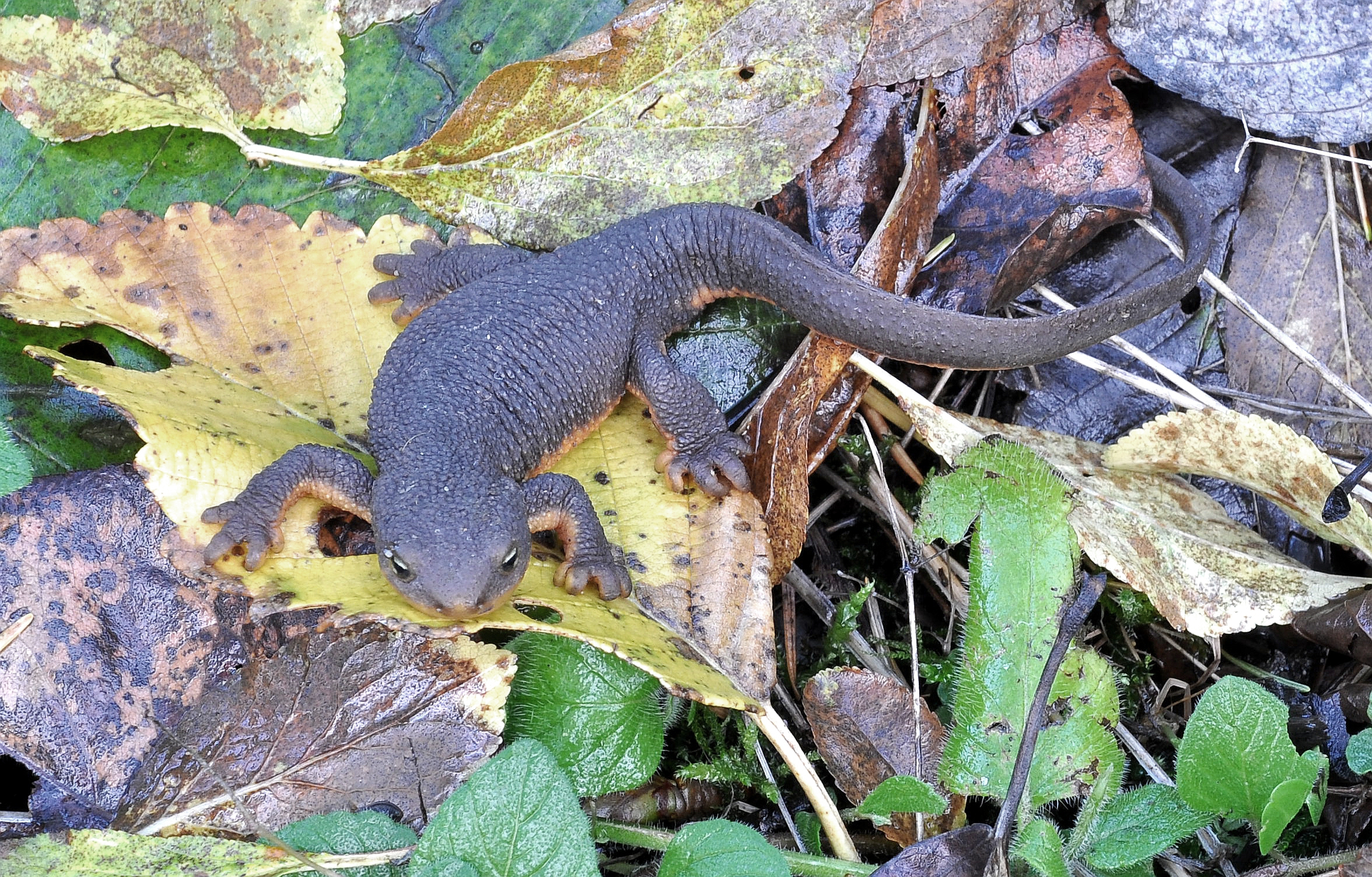
Taricha granulosa

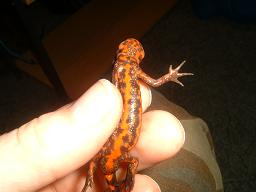
Cynops pyrrhogaster

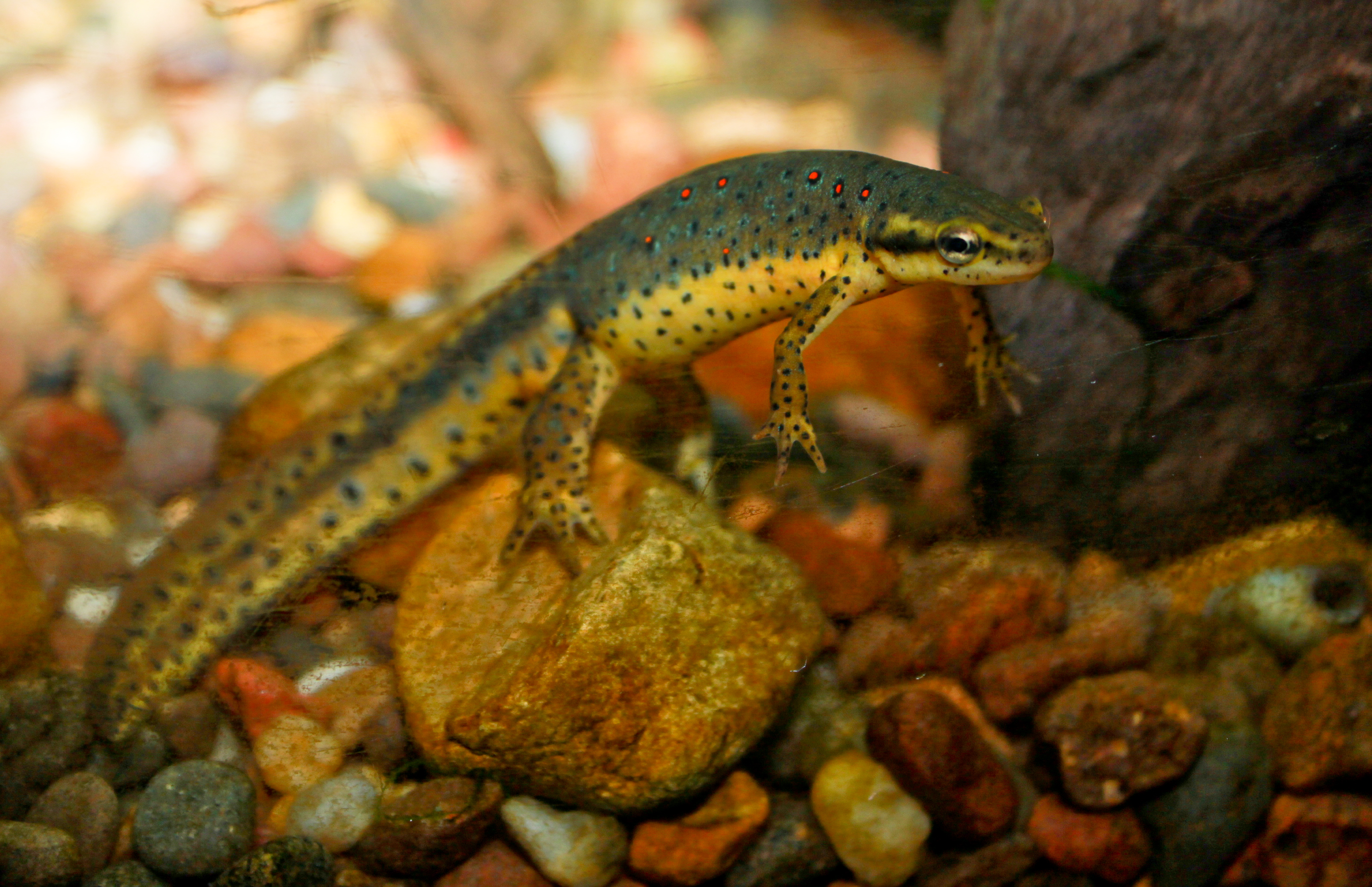
Notophthalmus viridescens

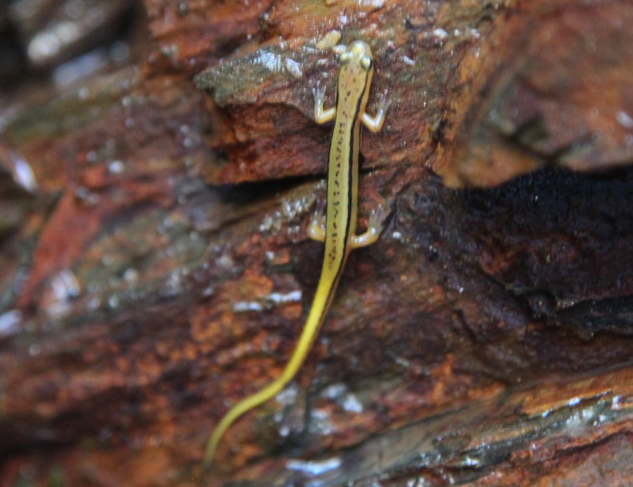
Eurycea wilderae

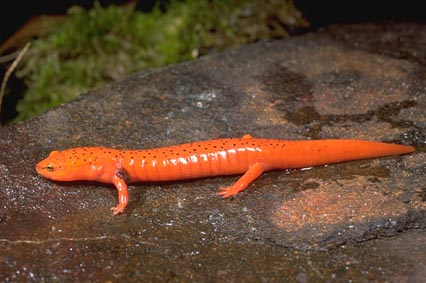
Pseudotriton ruber

Populations of the fire salamander (left) have been severely reduced in the Netherlands. The North American rough-skinned newt (centre) was killed by the fungus in laboratory tests. The Japanese fire-belly newt (right) is somewhat resistant and could have been a vector for the pathogen's introduction to Europe. The Eastern Newt, which is found across the eastern United States and parts of Canada is a susceptible Bsal host species.

The most comprehensive Bsal species susceptibility performed to date has been by Martel et al 2014. Their experiments demonstrated Bsal susceptibility followed a phylogenetic trend with many Salamandridae species being lethally susceptible. Recent work has demonstrated that some lungless species, specifically those in the Spelerpini tribe might also be clinically susceptible to Bsal.

== Threats to salamanders ==
Bsal is a serious threat to salamander species, while it has not yet been confirmed in North America, Bsal has had catastrophic effects on certain European salamander populations, believed to be the cause of a 96% decline in populations with in the Netherlands. More than a third of the worlds salamanders live in the United States, and 40% of those salamanders are already threatened. While regulations on the most likely avenue of introduction into North America, amphibian trade, are in place in both Canada and the United States, regulations are seriously lacking in Mexico. Furthermore, Bsal has the potential to infect an estimated 80 to 140 North American salamander species.

=== Tolerant ===
- Salamandrella keyserlingii
- Siren intermedia

=== Susceptible ===
- Cynops cyanurus
- Cynops pyrrhogaster
- Paramesotriton deloustali

=== Lethal ===
- Hydromantes strinatii
- Salamandrina perspicillata
- Salamandra salamandra
- Pleurodeles waltl
- Tylototriton wenxianensis
- Notophthalmus viridescens
- Taricha granulosa
- Euproctus platycephalus
- Lissotriton italicus
- Mesotriton alpestris
- Triturus cristatus
- Neurergus crocatus
- Eurycea wilderae
- Pseudotriton ruber

== Information sources ==
More information on Bsal and other diseases impacting amphibian populations, including Batrachochytrium dendrobatidis and Ranavirus can be found at the Southeast Partners in Amphibian and Reptile Conservation disease task team web-page.
