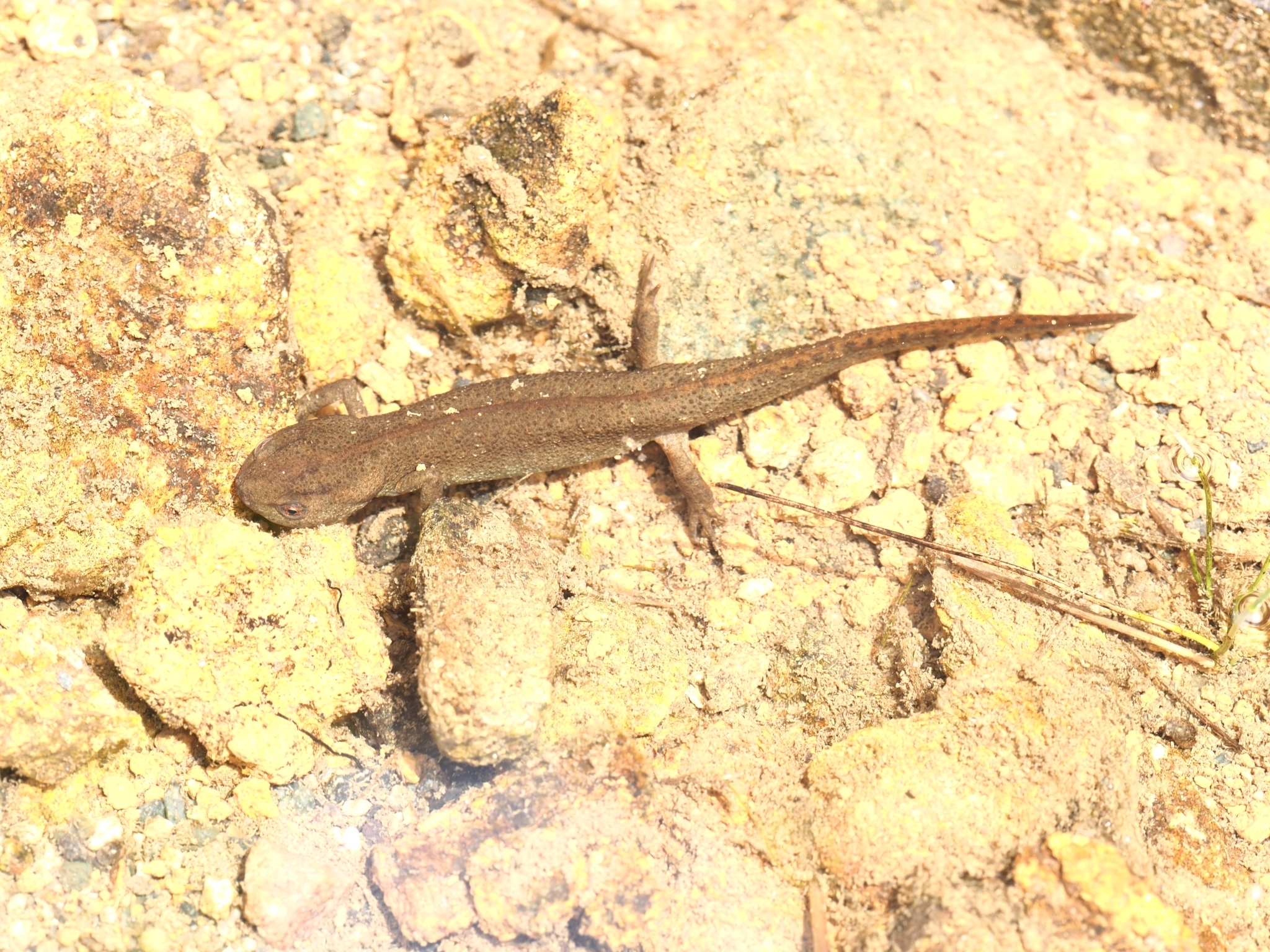

Conservation status
- Critically Endangered (IUCN 3.1)

Scientific classification
- Kingdom: Animalia
- Phylum: Chordata
- Class: Amphibia
- Order: Urodela
- Family: Salamandridae
- Genus: Cynops
- Species: C. fudingensis

Binomial name
- Cynops fudingensis Wu, Wang, Jiang & Hanken, 2010

Synonyms
- Hypselotriton fudingensis (Wu, Wang, Jiang & Hanken, 2010)

= Fuding fire belly newt =

Species of amphibian

The Fuding fire belly newt (Cynops fudingensis) is a rare species of newt in the family Salamandridae, endemic to China. It is only known from Fuding in northeastern Fujian, from the locality where it was described as a new species in 2010. Although it is genetically similar to the Chinese fire belly newt (C. orientalis), it is morphologically more similar to the Dayang fire belly newt (C. orphicus). The range of C. fudingensis is separate from both other species.

A revised taxonomy of Salamandridae places this species (together with all other Chinese species of Cynops) in genus Hypselotriton.

Cynops fudingensis is a small newt, usually less than 100 mm (3.9 in) in total length. The population from which the species was described lives in small, still-water puddles and ditches of a deserted agricultural field on a hillside near Taimushan (Mt. Taimu), west of Fuding City. Another nearby population may already be extinct. The species is not known from elsewhere, and the known population is threatened by habitat destruction associated with tourism, introduced predators (such as bullfrogs and red-eared slider turtles), and collection by herpetological hobbyists.

Reproduction requires the presence of a larger group of newts. Eggs are laid in April and are wrapped singly in leaves of water plants.
