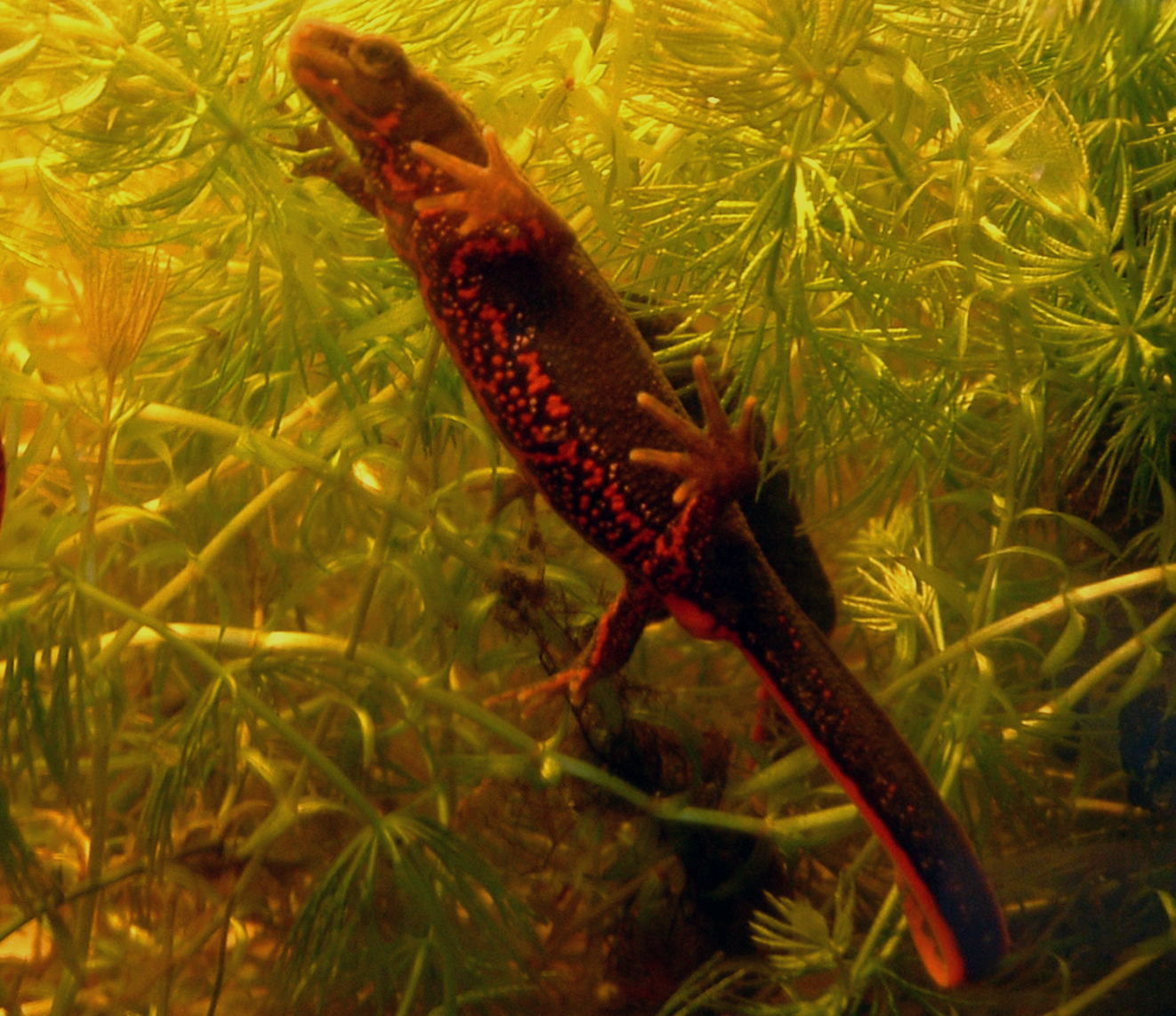
- Female Japanese fire-bellied newt

Conservation status
- Near Threatened (IUCN 3.1)

Scientific classification
- Kingdom: Animalia
- Phylum: Chordata
- Class: Amphibia
- Order: Urodela
- Family: Salamandridae
- Genus: Cynops
- Species: C. pyrrhogaster

Binomial name
- Cynops pyrrhogaster (Boie, 1826)
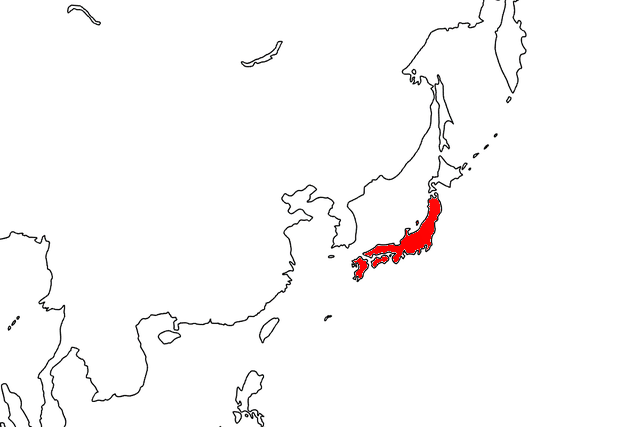

Synonyms
- Molge pyrrhogaster (Boie, 1826)

= Japanese fire-bellied newt =

Japanese fire-bellied newt Temporal range: 13.75–0 Ma Middle Miocene – Present

Species of amphibian

The Japanese fire-bellied newt or Japanese fire-bellied salamander (Cynops pyrrhogaster) is a species of newt endemic to Japan. The skin on its upper body is dark and its lower regions bright red, although coloration varies with age, genetics, and region. Adults are 8 to 15 cm (3.1 to 5.9 in) long. To deter predators, Japanese fire-bellied newts contain high levels of tetrodotoxin, a neurotoxin accumulated mainly from their diet.

The species is found on many Japanese islands, including Honshu, Shikoku, and Kyushu. Their habitats include both natural and artificial bodies of water, as well as forests and grasslands. They breed from spring to the beginning of summer, both sexes producing pheromones when ready to mate. Eggs are laid separately, hatching after about three weeks. They grow from larval to juvenile form in between five and six months. Juveniles eat soil-dwelling prey, and adults eat a wide variety of insects, tadpoles, and the eggs of their own species. They have several adaptations to avoid predators, although which they use depends on where they live. Several aspects of their biology have been studied, including their ability to regrow missing body parts.

The Japanese fire-bellied newt first diverged from its closest relative in the Middle Miocene, before splitting into four distinct varieties, each with a mostly separate range, although all four are formally recognized as composing a single species. Currently, their population is declining, and they face threats from disease and the pet trade. They can be successfully kept in captivity.

== Etymology and taxonomy ==
The species was first scientifically described by German zoologist Heinrich Boie in 1826 as Molge pyrrhogaster, (Note: Occasionally misspelled as Molga pyrrhogaster by some authors, including Boie himself.) based on specimens brought from Japan to Europe. He compared it to the smooth newt, saying he would have mistaken the former for the latter, had he not known it was from Japan. None of the specimens he studied were fully mature. Pyrrhogaster is derived from Greek, purrhos (lit. 'fire') and gastēr (lit. 'belly'). Salamandra subcristata was described by Coenraad Jacob Temminck and Hermann Schlegel in 1838 and transferred to Cynops later that year by Swiss naturalist Johann Jakob von Tschudi, and in 1850, Cynops subcristata and Molge pyrrhogaster were synomized as Cynops pyrrhogaster by the British zoologist John Edward Gray. A study of mitochondrial DNA in 2001 indicated that its supposed fellow members of Cynops, C. cyanurus and C. wolterstorffi, may belong to a different genus.

The Integrated Taxonomic Information System lists sixteen synonyms for Cynops pyrrhogaster. Common names of the species include Japanese fire-bellied newt, red-bellied newt, and Japanese fire-bellied salamander. Studies examining morphological and geographic variation had formerly recognized six races: Tohoku, Kanto, Atsumi, intermediate, Sasayama, and Hiroshima, one of which, the Sasayama, was described as a subspecies in 1969 by Robert Mertens as Triturus pyrrhogaster sasayamae, which is now considered a synonym of C. pyrrhogaster. Modern molecular analysis supports the division of C. pyrrhogaster into four clades instead. In particular, the validity of the Sasayama and intermediate races has never been proven, with one study finding no behavioral differences between the two supposed forms.

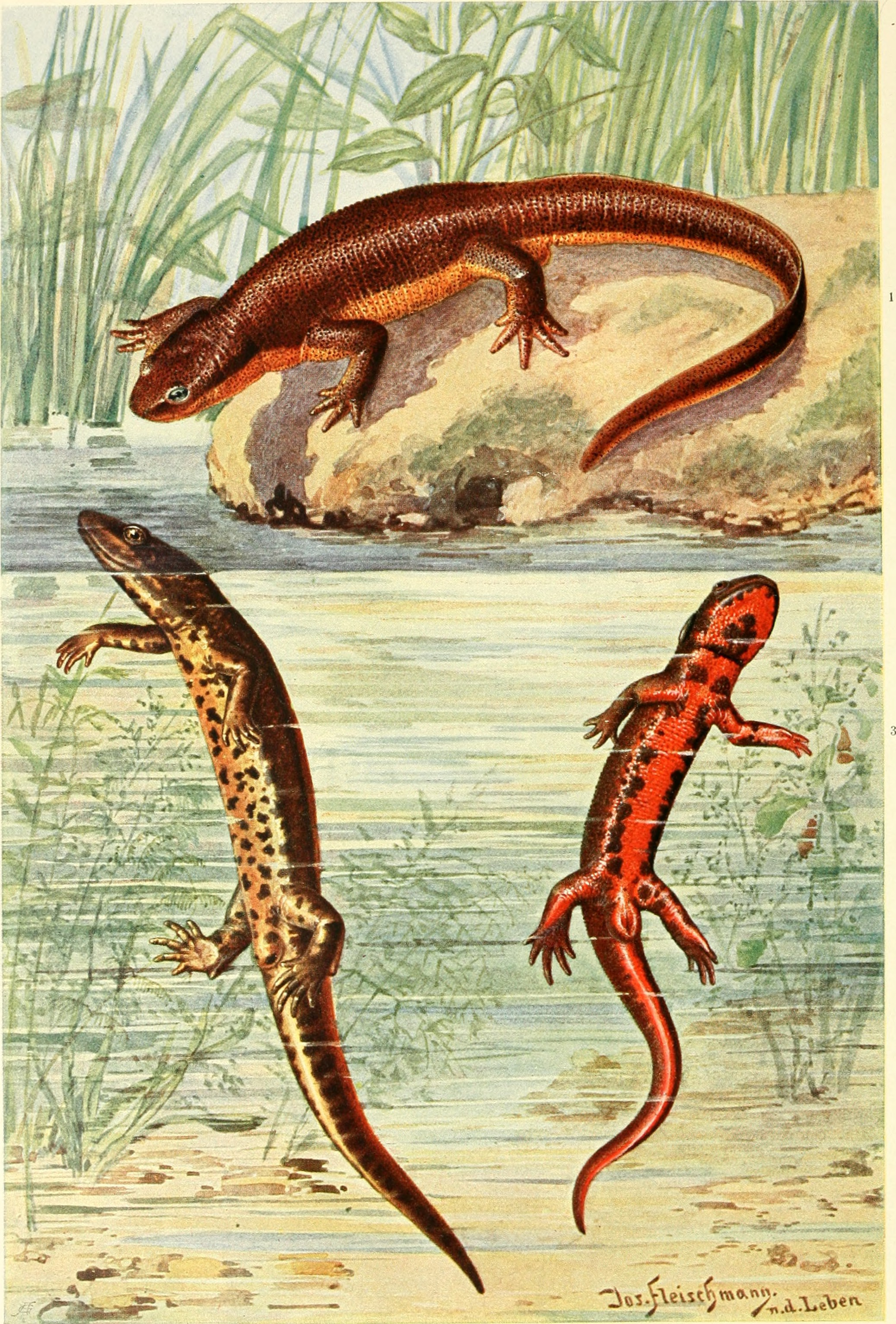
Illustration of various salamanders. Bottom right is C. pyrrhogaster.

Phylogenetic tree detail:

- - Triturus species
  - - - Pachytriton species
      - Paramesotriton species
    - - - Chinese fire belly newt (C. orientalis)
        - Chuxiong fire-bellied newt (C. cyanurus)
      - - Sword-tailed newt (C. ensicauda)
        - Japanese fire‑bellied newt (C. pyrrhogaster)
          - Northern clade
          - - Central clade
            - - Southern clade
              - Western clade

Cynops pyrrhogaster diverged from its close relative C. ensicauda about 13.75 million years ago (Mya; during the Middle Miocene). The common ancestor of the two species would have lived in an area of the Eurasian mainland which is today the East China Sea and the central Ryukyu Islands. The land that would become the Japanese islands – connected to the mainland at that time – likely had a subtropical climate, which may have caused the Japanese fire-bellied newt's ancestors to migrate northward for desirable habitat. Over time, C. pyrrhogaster split into four clades: northern, southern, western, and central. The northern diverged first, at around 9.68 mya, then the central around 8.23 mya, and finally the southern and western around 4.05 mya. The ranges of all but the southern clade declined during the Last Glacial Period, but expanded again afterwards. The study that identified them concluded that the four clades represent separate taxonomic units, although their exact relationship is unclear. It also noted their extreme genetic differences, unusually large for any one species. The ranges of the central and western varieties meet in Chugoku in western Japan to form a hybrid zone (an area where the two clades interbreed to produce hybrids). The central type has begun to move west, which has caused the hybrid zone to shift. It is expected to eventually cause the genome of the western form to be diluted by increasing hybridization.

== Description ==
Japanese fire-bellied newt on a human hand

On the newt's upper body, the skin is dark brown, approaching black, and covered in wartlike bumps. The underbelly and the underside of its tail are bright red, with black spots. Younger juveniles have creamy coloration instead of red, although most larger juveniles have some red present. Adults from smaller islands tend to have more red on their ventral (belly) regions than those from larger islands, sometimes with extremely small spots or none at all. In general males tend to have more red than females. Males can also be distinguished from females by their flat, wide tails and swelling around the ventral region. An entirely red variant exists: that coloration is believed to be inherited and recessive. This variant is not confined to any single population, but is more common in the western half of Japan overall.

The vomeropalatine teeth, a group of teeth in the upper back of the mouth, are arranged in two series. The tongue is relatively small, half the width of the mouth. The nostrils are positioned anteriorly (toward the head), closer to each other than to the eyes and hardly visible when viewed from above. The toes of males are longer than those of females, although the females themselves are longer. The tail is tightly compressed, with fins on both the top and bottom. A smooth ridge runs from their nape to their tail. The full body length of adults is 8 to 15 cm (3.1 to 5.9 in). Snout–vent length can be anywhere between 43.0 and 64.0 mm (1.69 and 2.52 in) for males and 48.5 and 75.0 mm (1.91 and 2.95 in) for females. Populations from more northern and elevated regions tend to be larger than those in southern and lower-altitude regions. Eggs are 2.1 to 2.3 mm (0.083 to 0.091 in) long.

== Distribution and habitat ==
Cynops pyrrhogaster is endemic to Japan, being found on several islands in the archipelago, including Honshu, Shikoku, and Kyushu. It mainly dwells on the larger islands, whereas its relative, C. ensicauda, is found in the Ryukyu Islands. It has the northernmost range of any Cynops species; all other species, besides the aforementioned C. ensicauda, are native to southern China. There is also an introduced population on Hachijō-jima, believed to be descended from individuals from Shikoku. Their introduction is thought to have occurred in the 1970s, although exactly how it happened is unknown. It has been recorded in the United States three times, in Florida and Massachusetts. Every instance was either an escape or deliberate release, and no populations have been established.

Of the four clades, the northern is found in the districts of Tohoku and Kanto. This does not overlap with the range of the central clade, which is found in Chubu, northern Kansai, and eastern Chugoku. The central's range has a small amount of overlap with the western, which is found in southern Kinki, western Chugoku, Shikoku, and central Kyushu. The western also has some overlap with the southern clade, which is found in western and southern Kyushu.

The newts occur at elevations of 30 to 2,020 m (98 to 6,627 ft). Ecosystems they are found in include forests, grasslands, shrublands, wetlands, lakes, marshes, and cultivated environments. They can also dwell in humanmade bodies of water, such as aquaculture ponds.

== Behavior and ecology ==
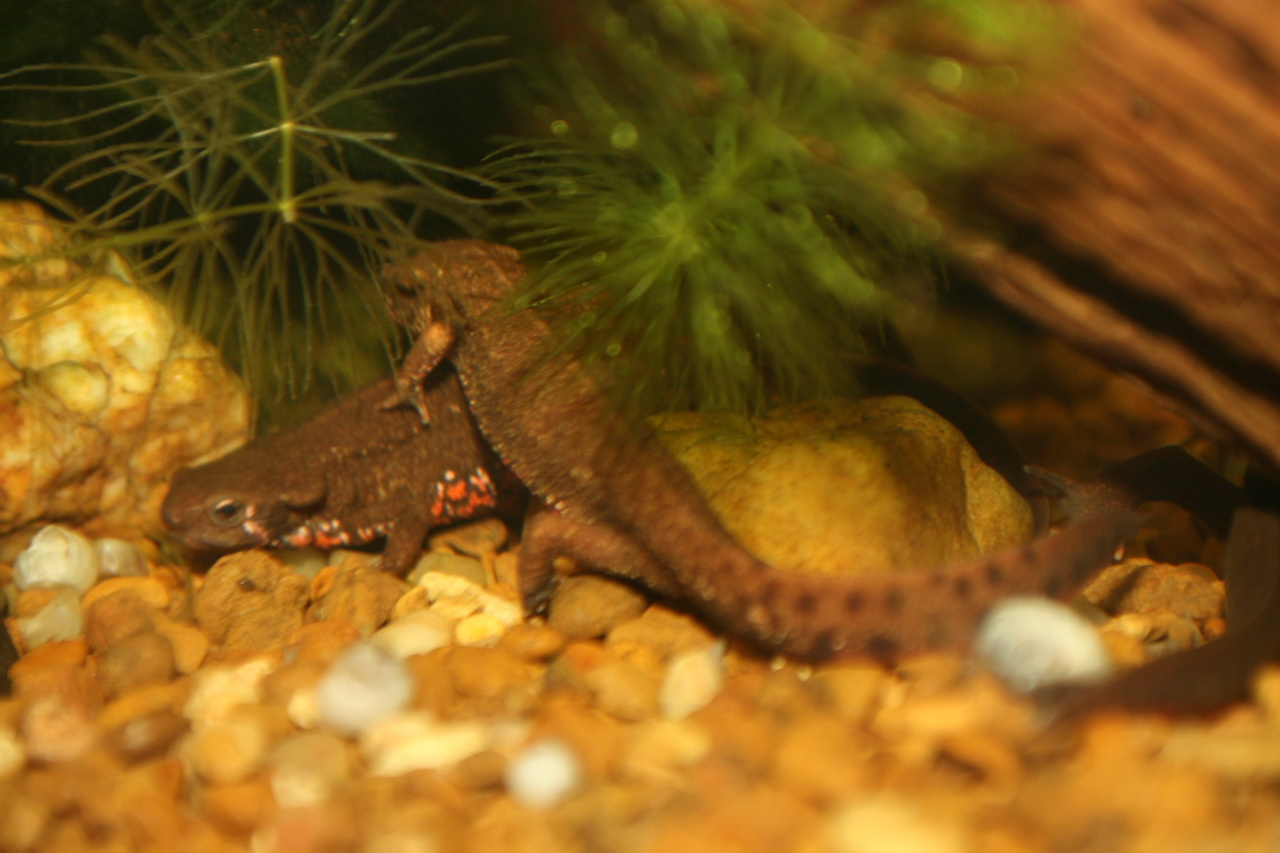
A pair of C. pyrrhogaster specimens

=== Reproduction and life cycle ===
Breeding occurs in paddy fields, ponds, brooks, pools, and streams. Females accept male courtship behavior from spring to early summer. Males and females both produce peptide pheromones to attract the opposite sex when ready to mate. Males produce a type known as sodefrin (from the Japanese term sodefuri, lit. 'soliciting'); females have their own variety, named imorin by its discoverers (from the Japanese term imo, lit. 'beloved woman', and rin from sodefrin). These are released from the cloaca, and were the first peptide pheromone to be identified in a vertebrate and first to be identified in a female vertebrate, respectively.

Courtship begins when the male approaches the female, sniffing its sides or cloaca. The male then brings its tail to the female and rapidly vibrates it. The female responds by pushing the male's neck with its snout. At this point, the male slowly moves away, undulating its tail, and the female follows, touching the tail with its snout when close enough. The male then deposits two to four spermatophores, one at a time, moving several centimeters after each, which the female attempts to pick up with its cloaca, sometimes unsuccessfully. Females lay eggs separately on underwater objects, such as leaves and submerged grass roots, fertilized one by one from the spermatophores they carry. They can lay up to 40 eggs in one session, and 100 to 400 eggs in a breeding season.

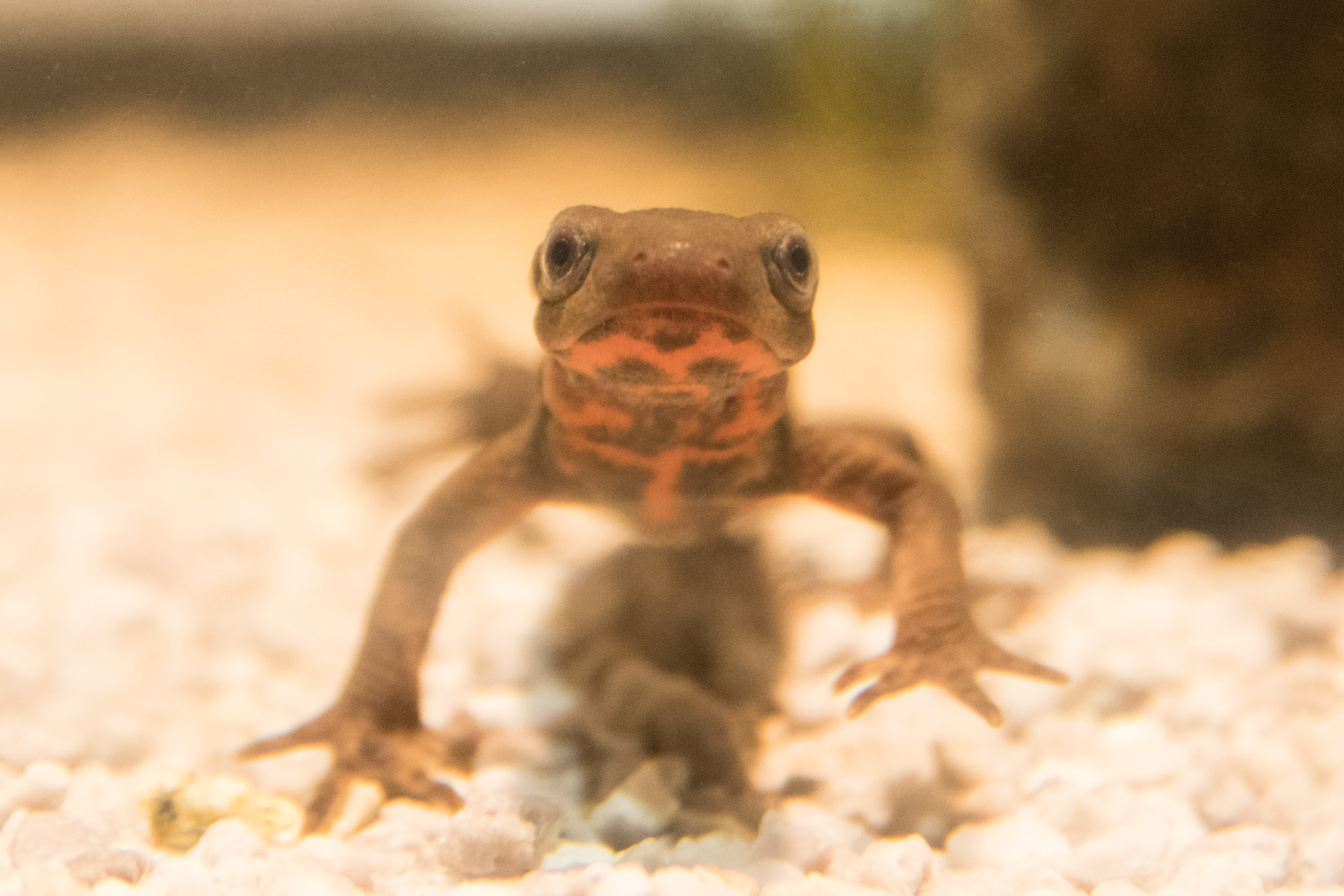
A newt, staring at the camera

The young hatch from their eggs after about three weeks, as swimming, gilled larvae, with dorsal tailfins. They grow around 3 cm (1.2 in) in the first three months of their lives. At between five and six months, they stop eating and undergo metamorphosis, losing their gills and fins, and becoming juveniles. Juveniles cannot remain submerged in water like larvae or they drown. Newts at lower altitudes mature faster than those at higher ones. Male newts of higher-altitude populations tend to live longer after reaching maturity, but their fully grown size is not as large as that of lowland newts. Wild individuals as old as twenty-three have been found.

=== Diet ===
In captive settings tadpoles are known to readily eat mosquito larvae, brine shrimp, and earthworms. Juveniles often consume soil-dwelling Collembola (springtails) and Acari (mite) species. Adults at one particular sub-alpine moor in the Azuma Mountains of Fukushima Prefecture were found to like both live prey and carrion. They consume many insect varieties, such as members of Odonata, which include dragonflies and damselflies, whose larvae have been found whole in newt stomachs, but only pieces of adults; Brachycera, a suborder of Diptera (flies); Hymenoptera, which include sawflies, wasps, bees, and ants; and Coleoptera (beetles). They also eat Rhacophorus arboreus tadpoles and the eggs of their own kind. The makeup of their diet varies seasonally and from year to year, suggesting changes in the small animals in and around the ponds that they dwell in. Similar results were found at a pond on the campus of Tokyo Metropolitan University in Hachiōji, Tokyo, the newt stomachs containing insects from many different orders, and again, the eggs of conspecifics. Like before, frog tadpoles were eaten, although these belonged to the species Rhacophorus schlegelii.

=== Predators ===
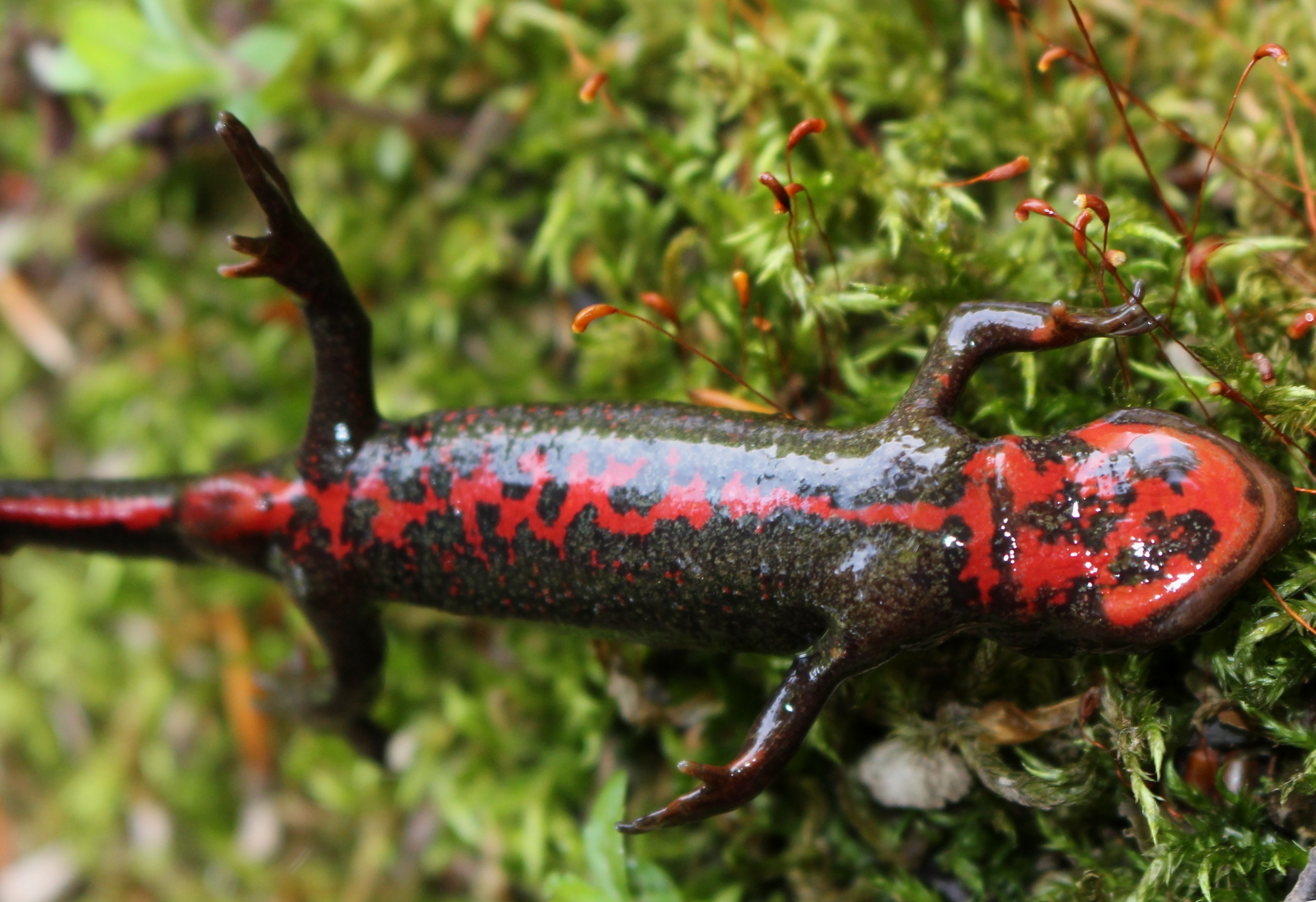
Japanese fire-bellied newt on its back, with the bright red ventral region clearly visible

Newts in Mainland Japan have different antipredator behavior than newts on smaller islands. Individuals on smaller islands (for instance, Fukue Island) generally use a maneuver called the unken reflex, where they expose their bright red underbelly to attackers. As their main predators are birds, which are capable of distinguishing the color red, this technique is effective. In Mainland Japan the newts must also avoid mammalian predators, which cannot distinguish colors as well as avian hunters. This leads these populations to use the maneuver less, as it can result in death if attempted.

Against snakes, newts from Fukue Island tend to perform tail-wagging displays, designed to bring a predator's attention to their replaceable tail rather than their more vital head; those from Nagasaki Prefecture in Mainland Japan tend simply to flee. Snakes are present in both areas. This behavior difference is likely because newts from the mainland are adapted to escape from mammalian hunters, which are less likely to be repelled by such a display.

=== Toxin ===
Wild Japanese fire-bellied newts contain high levels of the neurotoxin tetrodotoxin (TTX). This toxin inhibits the activity of sodium channels in most vertebrates, discouraging predation by both birds and mammals. Experiments have shown the toxin is almost entirely derived from the newt's diet. When raised in captivity with no source of TTX, 36- to 70-week-old juveniles did not contain detectable levels, but wild specimens from the same original habitat had high toxicity. In younger captive-reared newts some TTX was still detected, which was inferred to have been transferred by adult females to their eggs. In a follow-up experiment by the same team, captive-reared newts were given food containing the neurotoxin. They readily consumed TTX-laced bloodworms (Chironomidae larvae) when offered, not showing any symptoms after ingesting the poison. It was detectable in their bodies afterward, further indicating food to be the source of the toxin. No TTX-producing organisms are known from their habitat, but their existence is likely, and would explain the origin of TTX in wild newts.

== Conservation ==
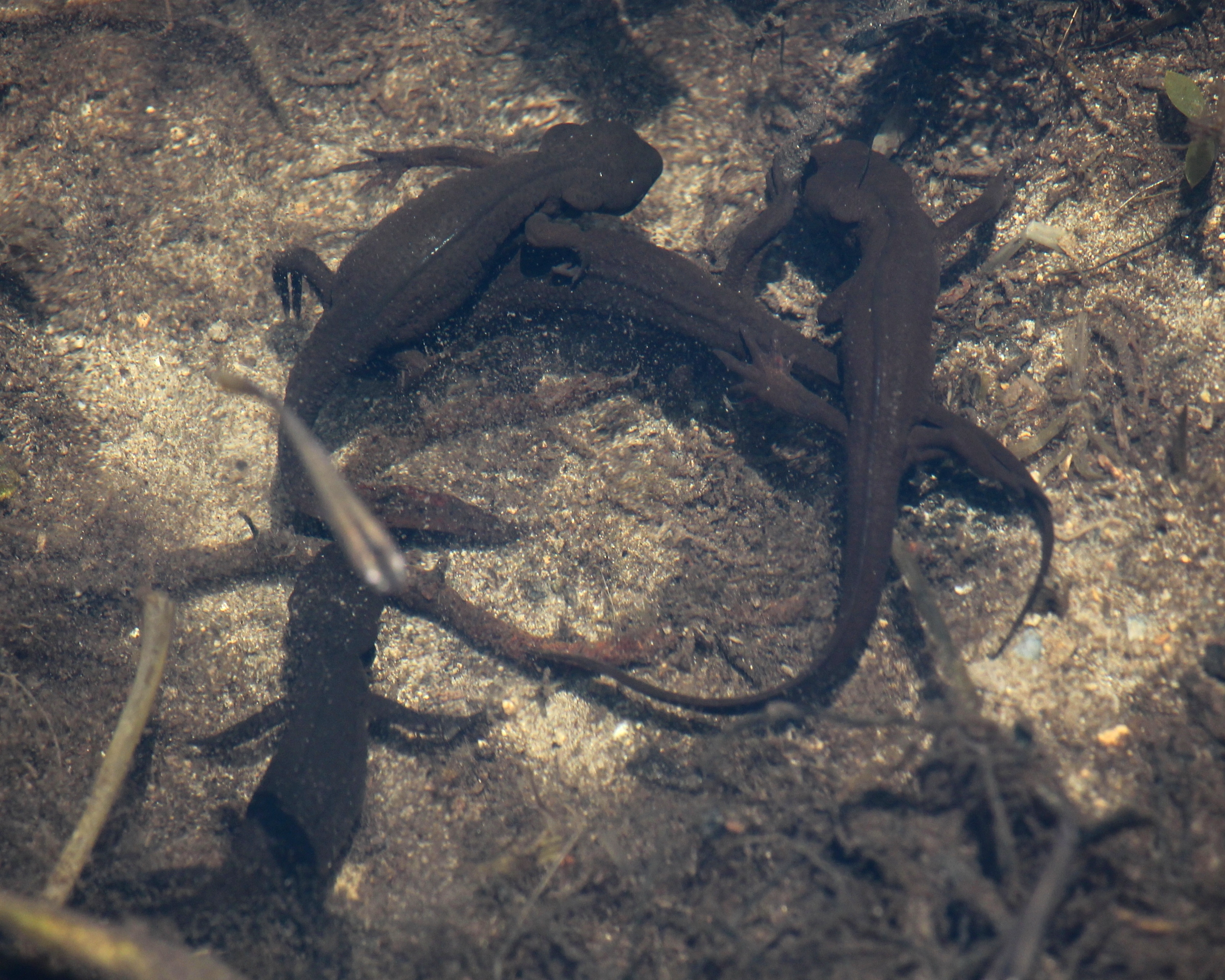
Group at Ikenokouchi Wetland in Tsuruga, Fukui Prefecture

The International Union for the Conservation of Nature (IUCN) has ranked it as near-threatened. This assessment was made in 2020, a shift from 2004 when it was rated least-concern. It successfully reproduces in Australian zoos. One major threat that C. pyrrhogaster faces is collection for the pet trade. The IUCN states that this trade needs to be ended immediately. Their population is decreasing, particularly near areas of human habitation.

Japanese fire-bellied newts with mysterious skin lesions at Lake Biwa in Japan's Shiga Prefecture were found to be suffering from infections caused by a single-celled eukaryote in the order Dermocystida. The lesions contained cysts, which were filled with spores. Nearly all the lesions were external, although one was found on the liver. Globally, diseases are one of the causes for declining amphibian populations. There is concern that this affliction could spread to other nearby species, including Zhangixalus arboreus and Hynobius vandenburghi.

A variety, believed to be found exclusively on the Atsumi Peninsula, was thought to have become extinct in the 1960s. Then, in 2016, a trio of researchers discovered that newts on the Chita Peninsula were very likely the same variant due to their similar morphological traits. Both groups share a preference for cooler temperature and have smooth and soft bodies, pale dorsal regions, and yellowish undersides. Even if still alive, this form is highly threatened and will soon be wiped out without immediate protection.

== Interactions with humans ==
=== Research ===
Japanese fire-bellied newts serve as a highly useful model organism in laboratory settings, but they become more difficult to care for after metamorphosis. An experiment supported by the Japan Society for the Promotion of Science found that thiourea (TU) can prevent this process from occurring, allowing the animals to stay in their pre-metamorphosis form for as long as two years, while still capable of metamorphosizing when removed from the TU solution. This did not have any impact on their regeneration capabilities.

Japanese fire-bellied newts produce motilin, a peptide that stimulates gastrointestinal contractions, identified in many vertebrates. It is created in the upper small intestine and pancreas. The discovery of the latter was the first time pancreatic motilin had been observed. The organ also produces insulin. These results represented the first discovery of motilin in amphibians, suggesting that it has a similar role for them as it does for birds and mammals. The existence of pancreatic motilin also indicated another, unknown function.

This species, as well as other Urodele amphibians, is capable of regrowing missing body parts, including limbs with functional joints and the lower jaw. When this process occurs, the regenerated tissue tends to mirror intact tissue in form. It is also able to regrow missing lenses, taking thirty days to do so as a larva and eighty days as an adult. The difference in time is purely due to the size of the eye, and regenerative ability does not change; the discovery of this fact contradicted a popular claim that juvenile animals are quicker to regenerate than adults.

Japanese fire belly newt in captivity in Saitama

=== In captivity ===
Cynops pyrrhogaster can be kept in captivity. Doctor of Veterinary Medicine Lianne McLeod described them as "low-maintenance", noting that captive newts enjoy bloodworms, brine shrimp, glass shrimp, Daphnia, and, for larger individuals, guppies.
