= Louise Rollins-Smith =

Immunology researcher

- Education: Hamline University, University of Minnesota
- Scientific career
- Fields: Immunology, Amphibians, Antimicrobial peptides
- Workplaces: Vanderbilt University
- Thesis: (1977)

Louise Rollins-Smith is a professor of biological sciences, professor of pediatrics, and a professor of pathology, microbiology and immunology at Vanderbilt University. She is known for her work investigating host-pathogen interactions using amphibians as model organisms.

== Education and career ==
Rollins-Smith received her Bachelor's degree in Biology at Hamline University, Saint Paul, Minnesota, before completing a Masters and a Ph.D. in zoology at the University of Minnesota in 1977. Rollins-Smith was a postdoctoral researcher at the University of Rochester before joining Vanderbilt University in 1984.

== Research ==
Rollins-Smith has studied disease and immunity in amphibians. Her early research was focused upon Lucké renal adenocarcinoma of leopard frogs, the development of immunological tolerance and immune changes at metamorphosis in frogs. Rollins-Smith has also studied the effects of immunotoxic and agricultural chemicals on amphibian immunity. Rollins-Smith's research has examined the link between widespread amphibian declines and the amphibian chytrid fungi, Bactrochochytrium dendrobatidis (Bd) and Batrachochytrium salamandrivorans (Bsal), particularly in relation to amphibian immunity. Rollins-Smith has also become known for her work on amphibian skin antimicrobial peptides (AMPs). Alongside her colleagues, she has provided evidence that the effectiveness of AMPs is a valuable predictor of amphibian species susceptibility to the Bd, and that AMPs are potent inhibitors of viral infection, including HIV infection of human T lymphocytes.

== Selected publications ==
- Carey, Cynthia; Cohen, Nicholas; Rollins-Smith, Louise (1999-09-01). "Amphibian declines: an immunological perspective". Developmental & Comparative Immunology. 23 (6): 459–472. doi:10.1016/S0145-305X(99)00028-2. ISSN 0145-305X. PMID 10512457.
- Rollins-Smith, Louise A. (1998). "Metamorphosis and the amphibian immune system". Immunological Reviews. 166 (1): 221–230. doi:10.1111/j.1600-065X.1998.tb01265.x. ISSN 1600-065X. PMID 9914915.
- Woodhams, D. C.; Ardipradja, K.; Alford, R. A.; Marantelli, G.; Reinert, L. K.; Rollins-Smith, L. A. (2007). "Resistance to chytridiomycosis varies among amphibian species and is correlated with skin peptide defenses". Animal Conservation. 10 (4): 409–417. Bibcode:2007AnCon..10..409W. doi:10.1111/j.1469-1795.2007.00130.x. ISSN 1367-9430.
- Rollins-Smith, Louise A. (2009-08-01). "The role of amphibian antimicrobial peptides in protection of amphibians from pathogens linked to global amphibian declines". Biochimica et Biophysica Acta (BBA) - Biomembranes. 1788 (8): 1593–1599. doi:10.1016/j.bbamem.2009.03.008. ISSN 0005-2736. PMID 19327341.
- Ramsey, Jeremy P.; Reinert, Laura K.; Harper, Laura K.; Woodhams, Douglas C.; Rollins-Smith, Louise A. (2010). "Immune Defenses against Batrachochytrium dendrobatidis, a Fungus Linked to Global Amphibian Declines, in the South African Clawed Frog, Xenopus laevis". Infection and Immunity. 78 (9): 3981–3992. doi:10.1128/iai.00402-10. PMC 2937463. PMID 20584973.

== Honors and awards ==
Rollins-Smith was elected a fellow of the American Association for the Advancement of Science in 2015.
