= Chenggong fire belly newt =

Conservation status
- Critically Endangered (IUCN 3.1)

Scientific classification
- Kingdom: Animalia
- Phylum: Chordata
- Class: Amphibia
- Order: Urodela
- Family: Salamandridae
- Genus: Cynops
- Species: C. chenggongensis

Binomial name
- Cynops chenggongensis Kou and Xing, 1983

Species of amphibian

The Chenggong fire belly newt (Cynops chenggongensis) is a species of newt of China. It is only known from its type locality, Shuitan in the Chenggong District of Yunnan.

Chinese Fire Belly Newts grow to be about two to four inches in length. Their backs are dark brown or black. However, their captivating feature is their colored belly, which is typically bright orange or red, marked with black spots. Their fiery underside is not just part of their appearance; it serves as their natural warning to let predators know their skin contains toxins.
