= Lens regeneration =

Regrowth of eye lens tissue in animals

== Overview ==
Regeneration of the lens in the eye has been studied since the 18th century. As this process has been explored, three different pathways have been found in which it can occur in different species, but most commonly in amphibians and rabbits. The three types of regeneration are Wolffian Lens regeneration, Cornea-Lens regeneration, and Lens Epithelial Cell regeneration. This article will cover the history behind the understanding of this phenomenon, the mechanisms it uses, and potential for applications in humans.

== History ==
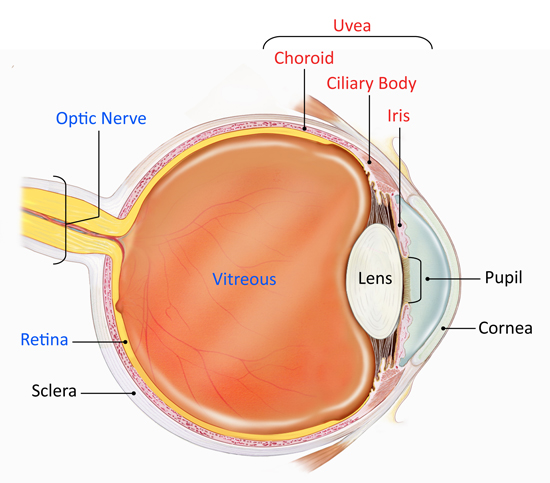
Figure 1. Diagram showcasing the anatomy of the eye.

Lens regeneration was first observed in 1781 by Charles Bonnet, who found that the eye of Triturus cristatus, an adult newt, had regenerated a smaller version of itself several months after the whole eye had been removed. Later, Vincenzo Colucci made a histological study of the phenomenon in newts, publishing his finding that it regenerated from the iris in 1891. Gustav Wolff then published several papers on the topic, starting in 1895, resulting in this form of regeneration now being called Wolffian regeneration. Wolff experimented with transplanting the iris into other areas of the newt body, into other species that could regenerate the lens, or into non-regenerative organisms. In his studies, he found that the dorsal iris, or upper part of the iris as seen in figure 1, was essential to regeneration while the ventral, or lower, iris was not. These tests also showed that the location of where the lens is regenerated is important, as it would not regrow when dorsal iris was placed into other areas of the body of a newt capable of regeneration. Additionally, if a lens was already present in the eye, a second lens would not grow. However, there is some debate over priority issues between Colucci and Wolff, which is examined in more detail by Holland (2021). Overall, these scientists were extremely important in developing an early knowledge base on Wolffian lens regeneration.

Regeneration of the lens in rabbits was first studied by French surgeons Cocteau and Leroy-D'Étiolle, starting in 1824. The crystalline contents of the lens capsule was removed but this was found to regenerate within a month. Rabbits use Lens Epithelial Cell regeneration, meaning that they use remaining lens cells in the eye to regenerate the lens. Other animals in which lens regeneration has been observed include cats, chickens, dogs, fish, mice, rats and Xenopus frogs. These frogs use Cornea-Lens regeneration to regrow the lens, meaning cells within the cornea differentiate into lens epithelial cells.

== Mechanisms ==
The regeneration of the lens via Wolffian lens regeneration has been studied in several vertebrate species, especially the newt, which is able to repeatedly regenerate a perfect lens throughout its lifetime. One study found that the newt Cynops pyrrhogaster, that had its lens extracted and regenerated 18 times, was indistinguishable from the lens of a control newt in terms of appearance and gene expression. In such cases, the lens has been found to regenerate completely from pigmented epithelial cells in the iris. Upon the removal of the lens in newts, dorsal iris pigmented epithelial cells (IPEs) will enlarge, divide several times, lose their pigment, and transdifferentiate to lens epithelial cells. These cells then form a small vesicle that is still attached to the upper iris. This early, lens-like, pouch then detaches from the iris, after which the lens fully forms. The signaling mechanisms that might control this process include fibroblast growth factor, hedgehog, retinoic acid, transforming growth factor beta and wnt. However, the order in which they work and relative importance between these pathways to lens regeneration is not known.

A unique aspect of Wolffian regeneration is that the cells comprising the newly regenerated lens are formed in a way that is different from their original cell trajectory. Specifically, the cornea is derived from the surface ectoderm of an embryo, and lens epithelial cells form from this during the original generation of the lens. However, the IPEs are derived from the neuroectoderm, so during regeneration, the trajectory in which the lens is regrown is different.

Cornea Lens regeneration makes use of undifferentiated stem cells or transit amplifying cells which are present in the basal layer of the cornea in the eye. These cells do not undergo transdifferentiation as seen in Wolffian regeneration, as they were never differentiated in the first place. In this process, the lens vesicle develops while attached to the cornea, after which it will detach and finish regeneration into a full lens. Interestingly, some cornea epithelial cells within the basal layer of the cornea were found to express proteins characteristic of the lens.

Lens Epithelial Cell regeneration starts with pre-existing lens epithelial cells that proliferate, or replicate, to reform the lens. This regeneration is used by organisms that can regenerate their lens upon the removal of the crystalline interior lens material or in general, partial removal of the lens. One condition of this is that the posterior and anterior areas of the lens capsule must remain intact. This is because Lens Epithelial Cell regeneration only regrows the interior portion of the lens, meaning the shape of the regenerated lens depends on the original lens capsule. When the lens regrows, it is done so by the sides of the lens regrowing inwards. Haotian, Hong, Jie, Shan trial conducted experiments on mice, rabbits and cultured human cells and reported that the proteins produced by the PAX6 and BMI1 genes were essential for regeneration of existing lens epithelial cells (LECs) lining the lens capsule. This type of regeneration is most common in mammals, specifically rabbits and dogs.

== Application in Humans ==
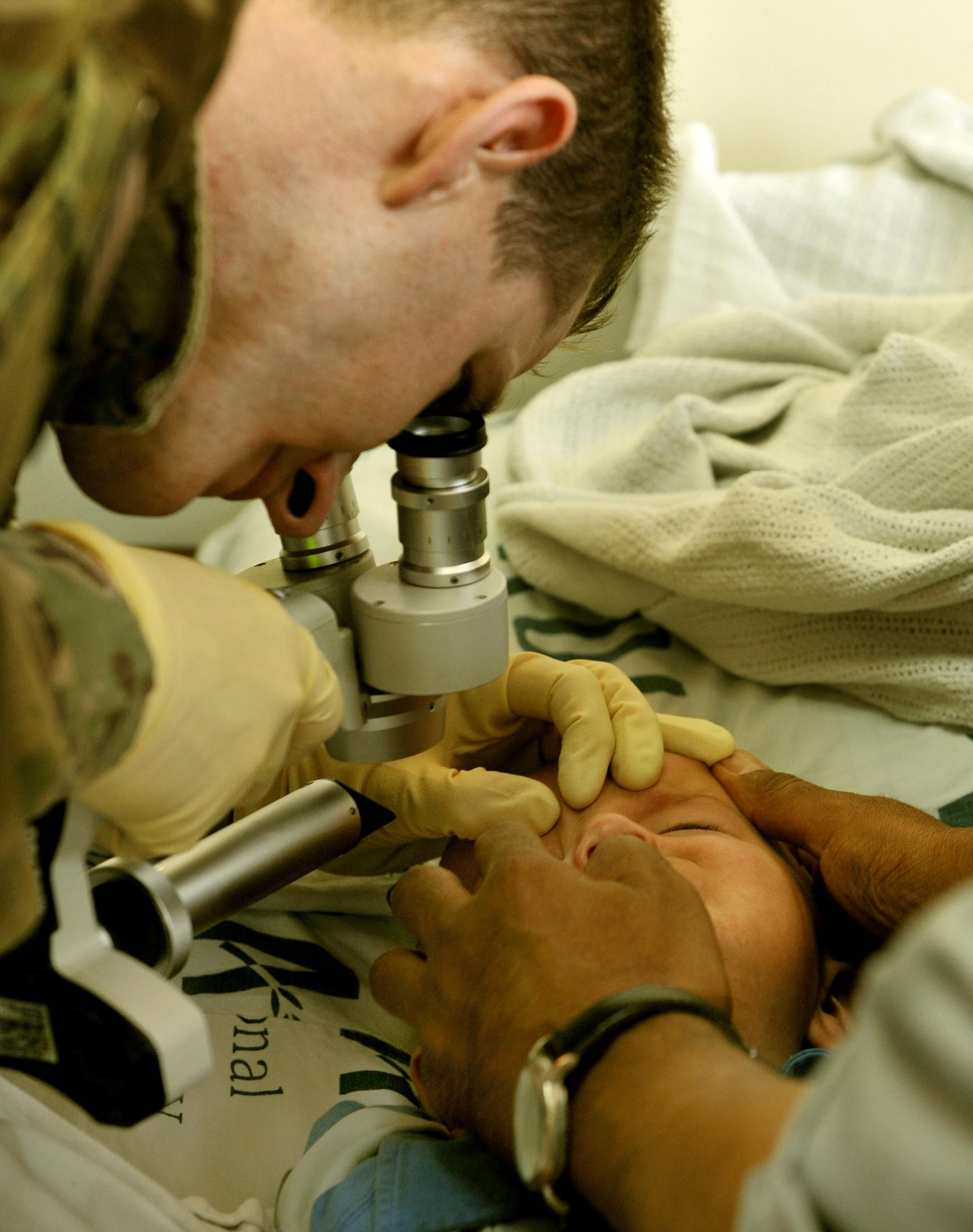
Examination of a child with cataracts

The ability to regenerate the lens could have major implications for humans, specifically the treatments of various lens disorders, like cataracts. Currently, the best treatment for cataracts is to replace the clouded lens with an artificial lens called an intraocular lens (IOL). While this method works well in adults, conventional treatment of childhood cataracts (under 2 years of age) can cause complications because they are still growing. Children are thus more likely to develop unpredictable myopia post-surgery.

In 2016, a lens regeneration technique was published and trialed in a collaboration between Sun Yat-sen University and University of California, San Diego. In these trials, the capsule of the lens was pierced with a smaller cut than in conventional cataract surgery (1–1.5 mm) and drained of its contents. The capsule was otherwise left intact and remaining lens epithelial cells then proliferated to regenerate the lens via Lens Epithelial Cell regeneration. The technique was performed successfully in experiments in rabbits and macaques, and subsequently in a trial of twelve children under two years in China who had been born with cataracts. Working lenses regenerated within six to eight months.

Children treated with the experimental technique experienced fewer complications than the children treated with conventional surgery. The technique has yet to be tried with older patients with age-related cataracts but is expected to be less successful. Adult cataracts are more difficult to remove, and adult lens stem cells regenerate more slowly.

The rabbit is suitable for development of surgical techniques on the eye because it is easy to handle and its eye is comparatively large. Research in rabbits showed that their lens would start to regenerate within two weeks after a capsulotomy. The new lens was similar in structure, but its shape might be irregular. Filling the capsule during regeneration seemed to encourage development of a more normal shape.

Another regenerative technique is to grow eye tissues, such as the lens, outside the body or in vitro and then to implant it. This has been tried in a collaboration between Osaka University and Cardiff University.
