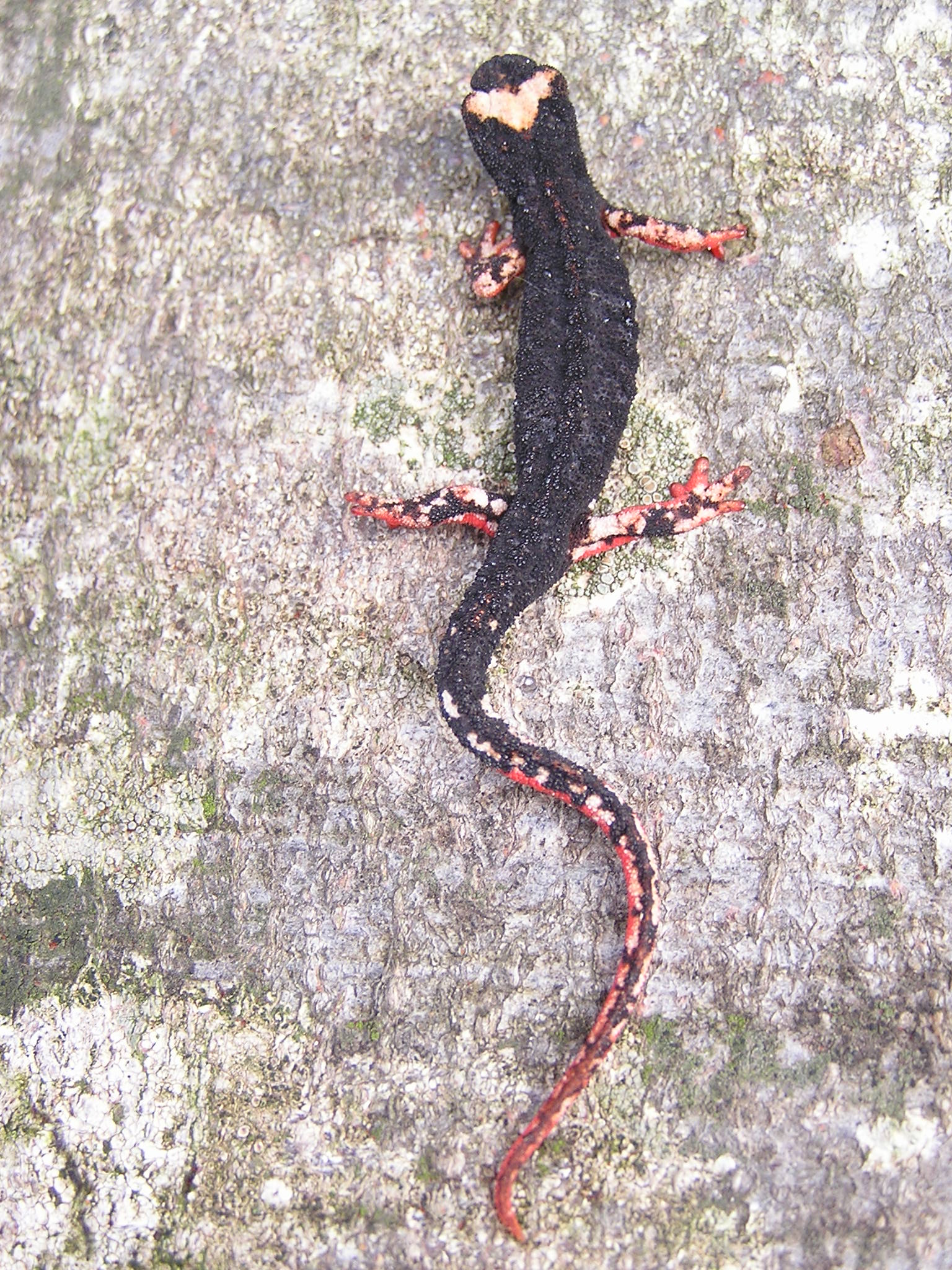
- Salamandrina terdigitata

Scientific classification
- Kingdom: Animalia
- Phylum: Chordata
- Class: Amphibia
- Order: Urodela
- Family: Salamandridae
- Subfamily: Salamandrininae
- Genus: Salamandrina; Fitzinger, 1826
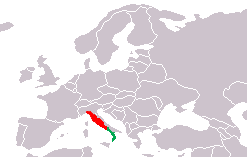
- Distribution in Italy: red - S. perspicillata green - S. terdigitata

= Salamandrina =

Salamandrina Temporal range: Miocene–Recent

Genus of amphibians

Salamandrina, the spectacled salamanders, is a genus of salamander, the only of subfamily Salamandrininae in the family Salamandridae which is still alive, as one of its own relatives is extinct. The IUCN Red List follows Mattoccia et al. (2005) and Canestrelli et al. (2006) in accepting two species, both only found in Italy:

- Southern spectacled salamander (Salamandrina terdigitata)
- Northern spectacled salamander (Salamandrina perspicillata)

DNA testing is the most effective way to distinguish between S. terdigitata and S. perspicillata, however there are some slight morphological differences between the two species. S. terdigitata is on average 1 cm shorter than S. perspicillata as well as having more extensive red coloration on its Vental side.

Fossils show that the genus formerly had a wider distribution during the Miocene and Pliocene including Spain, Germany, Hungary and Greece.
