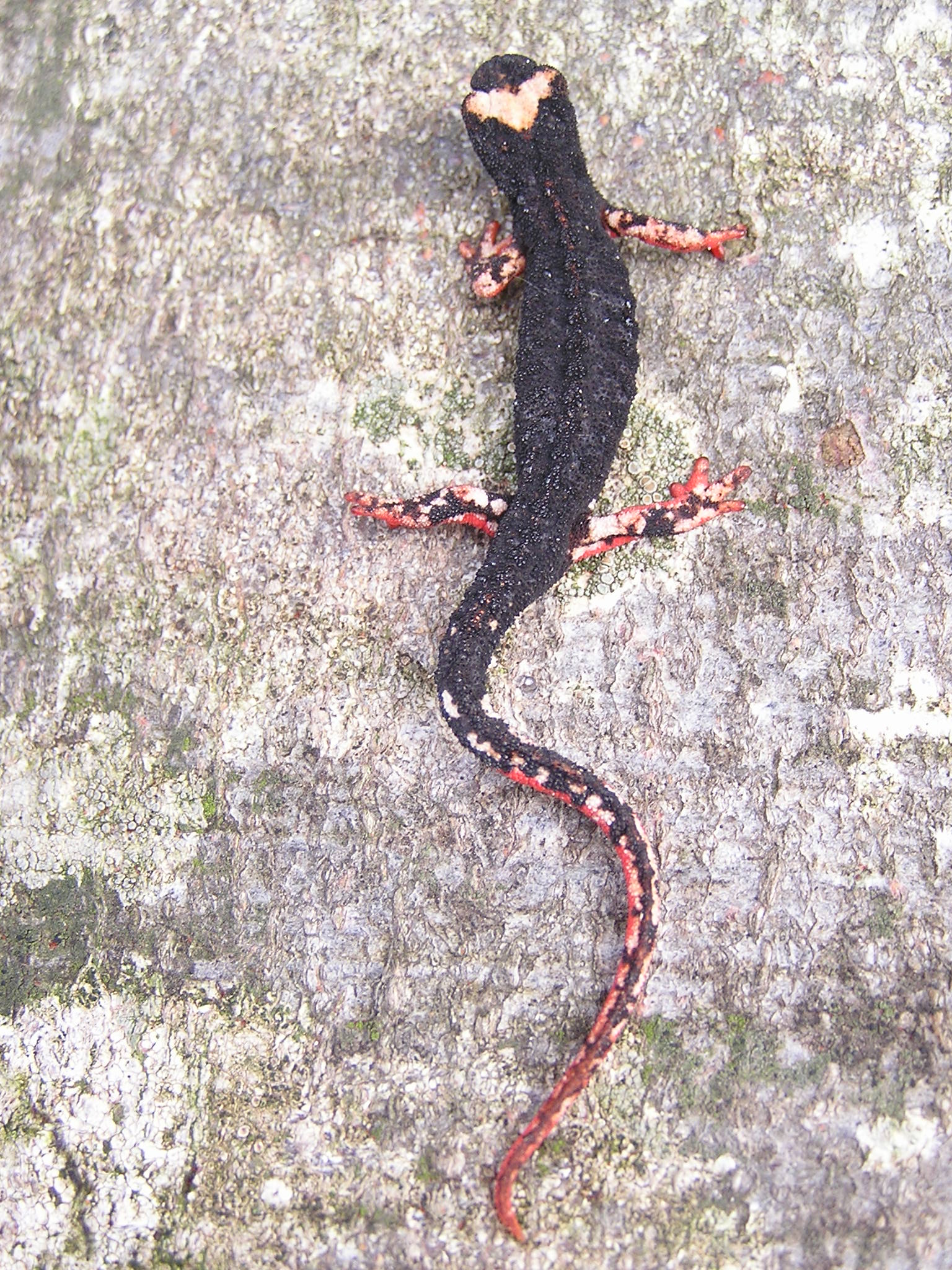

Conservation status
- Least Concern (IUCN 3.1)

Scientific classification
- Kingdom: Animalia
- Phylum: Chordata
- Class: Amphibia
- Order: Urodela
- Family: Salamandridae
- Genus: Salamandrina
- Species: S. terdigitata

Binomial name
- Salamandrina terdigitata Lacépède, 1788
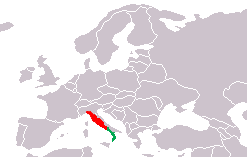
- Distribution in Italy: red - S. perspicillata green - S. terdigitata

= Spectacled salamander =

Species of amphibian

The spectacled salamander (Salamandrina terdigitata) is a species of salamander in the family Salamandridae.

This species is found only in the southern Apennine Range in Italy in humid valleys and shady, overgrown hillsides at altitudes between 200 and 1,200 m; to the north it borders the range of its sister species S. perspicillata. It is considered an important indicator species of environmental health.

It has four toes on the hind feet rather than the five normally found in other salamanders and newts. It has a warty, brownish-black back, and a rather ribbed appearance on its flanks, with a creamy white, V-shaped mark between the eyes. The underside is covered in black and white markings, with pinkish-red underside to legs and tail.

The spectacled salamander is most often found near streams, in dense vegetation, under leaf litter, dead wood, or stones. It is nocturnal and terrestrial. When threatened, it raises its tail and legs (unkenreflex), displaying its red underside as a deterrent. Similar warning displays (aposematism) are shown by newts, the Apennine yellow-bellied toad and the spotted salamander. Mating takes place on land in spring. Clutches contain about 30-50 eggs and the larvae take 2-3 mo to develop. The spectacled salamander female enters water only to lay eggs, while the male, once metamorphosis has taken place, avoids water altogether.

The IUCN Red List follows Mattoccia et al. (2005) and Canestrelli et al. (2006) in separating Salamandrina perspicillata from S. terdigitata.
