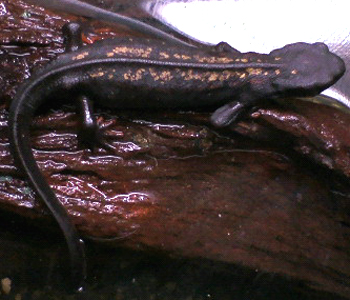
- C. e. popei

Conservation status
- Vulnerable (IUCN 3.1)

Scientific classification
- Kingdom: Animalia
- Phylum: Chordata
- Class: Amphibia
- Order: Urodela
- Family: Salamandridae
- Genus: Cynops
- Species: C. ensicauda

Binomial name
- Cynops ensicauda (Hallowell, 1861)

Synonyms
- List: Triton ensicauda Hallowell, 1861 "1860"; Triturus (Cynops) pyrrhogaster ensicaudus – Nakamura and Ueno, 1963; Triturus ensicauda – Sato, 1943; Triturus ensicaudus ensicaudus – Inger, 1947; Triturus ensicaudus popei Inger, 1947; Triturus ensicaudus – Dunn, 1918; Triturus pyrrhogaster ensicaudus – Kawamura, 1950

= Sword-tail newt =

Endangered amphibian

The sword-tailed newt, yellow-bellied newt, or Okinawa newt (Cynops ensicauda) is a species of true salamander from the Ryukyu Archipelago in Japan.

It has recently been placed on Japan's Red List of Threatened Amphibians. Sword-tail newts are poisonous, and may also be referred to as fire-bellied newts due to the orange coloration of their underside. They are not to be confused with the common Chinese and Japanese species. It is distinguished from these two species by their larger size, broader heads and smoother skin. Its coloration ranges from brown to black, occasionally with an orange dorsal stripe. Some individuals may have light spotting or speckling on their backs.

Sword-tailed newts can reach 12.8 cm (5.0 in) in males and 18 cm (7.1 in) in females. They are the largest living members of their genus. They exhibit sexual dimorphism. Females' tails are longer than the rest of their body; those of males are much shorter, and sometimes display a whitish sheen during breeding season.

== Habitat and distribution ==
The sword-tailed newt is only found on the Ryukyu Archipelago, an island chain off the southern coast of Japan, as well as on many smaller surrounding islands. The newts typically live in cool, stagnant bodies of water. They are commonly found in man-made structures such as rice paddies, road-side ditches, and cattle waterholes. The two known subspecies of sword-tailed newt are C. e. ensicauda and C. e. popei. Due to the subtropical climate of its native habitat, it is more tolerant of high temperatures than other Cynops. The sword-tailed newt has no natural predators, thus deforestation and land development are the main causes of their endangerment.

As of 2010, breeding grounds were visited by 75% less newts than in 1996. Many of their breeding sites are in roadside ditches and gutters, and they are highly territorial, making it difficult to relocate them.

== Trends and threats ==
The populations of C. ensicauda have declined in recent years, especially as a result of habitat destruction due to land development. Large predatory fish of the genus Tilapia have been introduced into traditional breeding ponds. Even in locations where suitable forest habitat has been preserved, the construction of access roads with concrete drainage ditches kills many; the newts wander to forage on rainy days and may fall into the ditches, where they will die when the rain ceases (Goris and Maeda 2004).
