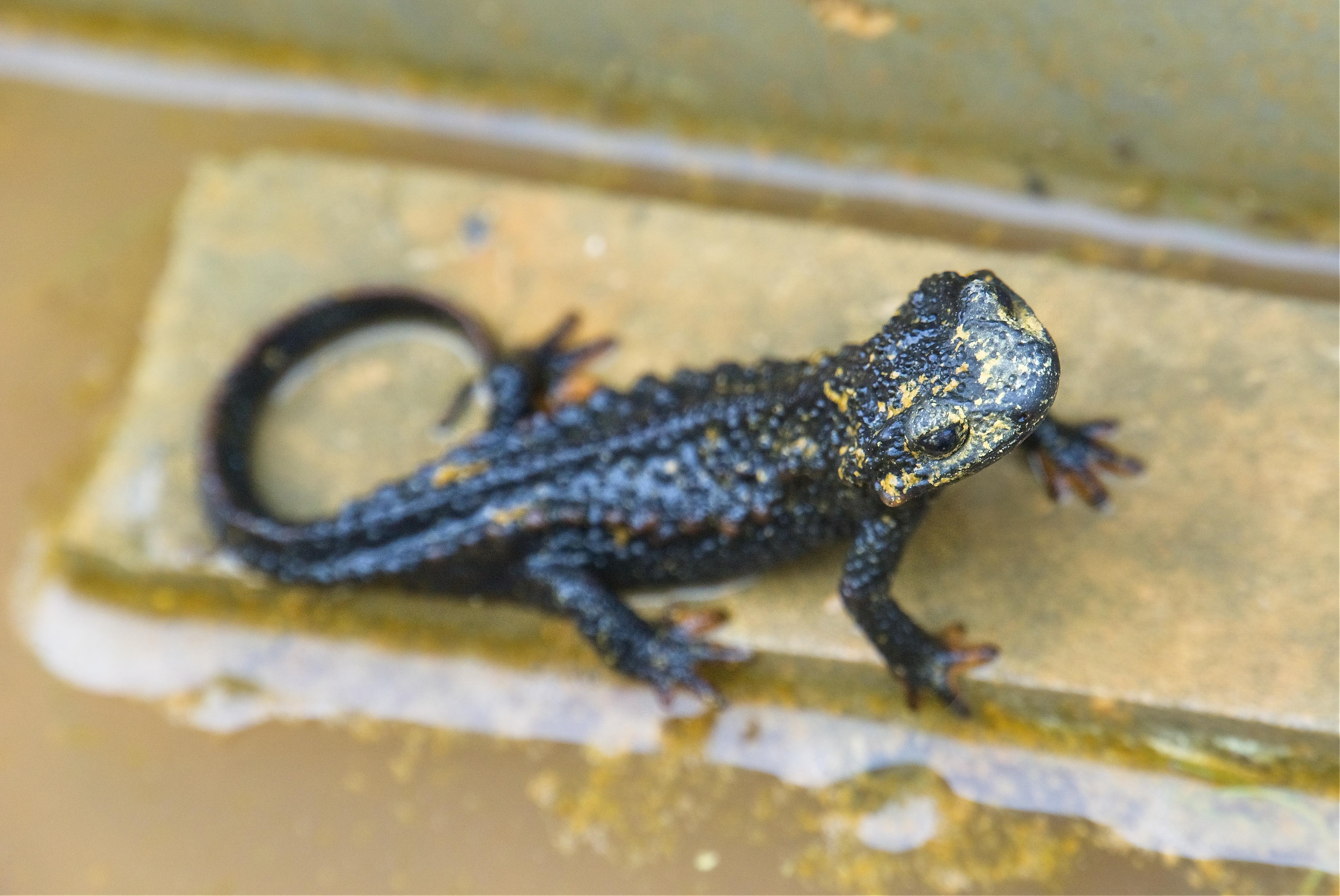

Scientific classification
- Kingdom: Animalia
- Phylum: Chordata
- Class: Amphibia
- Order: Urodela
- Family: Salamandridae
- Subfamily: Pleurodelinae
- Genus: Echinotriton; Nussbaum & Brodie, 1982

= Echinotriton =

Genus of amphibians

Echinotriton is a genus of salamanders in the family Salamandridae.

== Species ==
It contains the following species:

Image	Scientific name	Distribution
	Echinotriton andersoni (Boulenger, 1892)	Ryukyu Islands(Okinawa and nearby island regions) of Japan
	Echinotriton chinhaiensis (Chang, 1932)	Zhejiang province, China
	Echinotriton maxiquadratus Hou, Wu, Yang, Zheng, Yuan, and Li, 2014	China
	Echinotriton raffaellii Hernandez and Dufresnes, 2022	Ryukyu Islands(Tokunoshima, Amami Ōshima, and surrounding islands) of Japan
