= Chinhai spiny newt =

Conservation status
- Critically Endangered (IUCN 3.1)
- CITES Appendix II

Scientific classification
- Kingdom: Animalia
- Phylum: Chordata
- Class: Amphibia
- Order: Urodela
- Family: Salamandridae
- Genus: Echinotriton
- Species: E. chinhaiensis

Binomial name
- Echinotriton chinhaiensis (Chang, 1932)

Synonyms
- Tylototriton chinhaiensis Chang, 1932

Species of salamander

The Chinhai spiny newt (Echinotriton chinhaiensis) is a species of salamander in the family Salamandridae, found only in a small section of Zhejiang province in eastern China. Its natural habitats are temperate forests, freshwater marshes, and ponds.

The Chinhai spiny newt is unique to the Beilun District east of Ningbo. It is threatened by habitat loss.

Observations of captive animals suggest the Chinhai spiny newt is a late-maturing, long-lived species: they reach sexual maturity at 10 years age or later, and their lifespans are at least 20 years.
