= Dayang newt =

Conservation status
- Endangered (IUCN 3.1)

Scientific classification
- Kingdom: Animalia
- Phylum: Chordata
- Class: Amphibia
- Order: Urodela
- Family: Salamandridae
- Genus: Cynops
- Species: C. orphicus

Binomial name
- Cynops orphicus Risch, 1983

Species of amphibian

The Dayang newt (Cynops orphicus) is a rare species of salamander in the family Salamandridae, endemic to China. It is known from Jiexi County in eastern Guangdong from where it was collected in 1936 (more specifically, from Dayang, which gave it the common name) and described as a new species in 1983. More recently, it has also been found from Dehua County in central Fujian.

Its natural habitats are pools and small lakes, and during hibernation, terrestrial habitats, including forest and lightly degraded areas. It is threatened by habitat loss and degradation.
