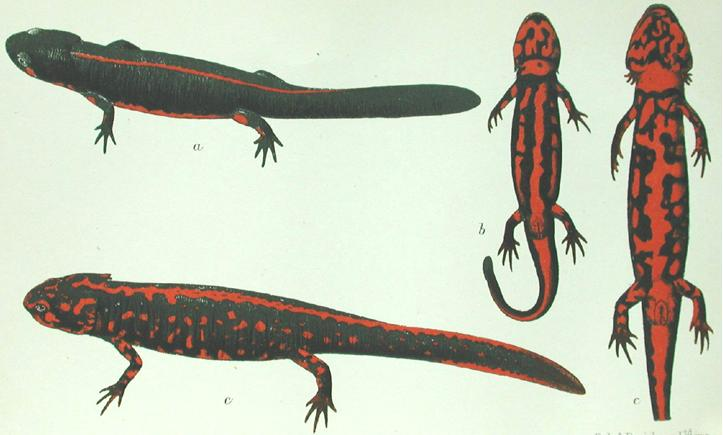

Conservation status
- Extinct (1979) (IUCN 3.1)

Scientific classification
- Kingdom: Animalia
- Phylum: Chordata
- Class: Amphibia
- Order: Urodela
- Family: Salamandridae
- Genus: Cynops
- Species: †C. wolterstorffi

Binomial name
- †Cynops wolterstorffi (Boulenger, 1905)

Synonyms
- Molge wolterstorffi Boulenger, 1905; Hypselotriton wolterstorffi (Boulenger, 1905)

= Yunnan lake newt =

Extinct species of amphibian

The Yunnan lake newt (Cynops wolterstorffi) is an extinct species of newt in the family Salamandridae, and was also known as Wolterstorff's newt. It was only found near the Kunming Lake in Yunnan, China. It was found in shallow lake waters and adjacent freshwater habitats. Despite extensive surveys, it has not been seen since 1979, and was officially declared extinct by the IUCN in 2005. The reasons for its extinction are believed to be habitat loss, pollution, and introduced species.

== Etymology ==
The specific name wolterstorffi honours Willy Wolterstorff, German geologist and herpetologist.
