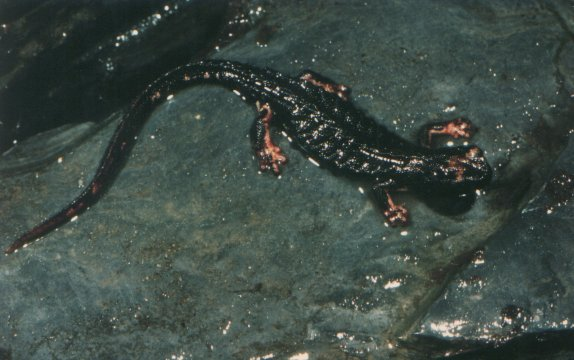

Conservation status
- Endangered (IUCN 3.1)

Scientific classification
- Kingdom: Animalia
- Phylum: Chordata
- Class: Amphibia
- Order: Urodela
- Family: Salamandridae
- Genus: Salamandrina
- Species: S. perspicillata

Binomial name
- Salamandrina perspicillata (Savi, 1821)
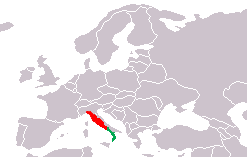
- Distribution in Italy: red - S. perspicillata green - S. terdigitata

= Salamandrina perspicillata =

Species of amphibian

Salamandrina perspicillata, the northern spectacled salamander, is a species of salamander in the family Salamandridae found only in Italy.

The IUCN Red List follows Mattoccia et al. (2005) and Canestrelli et al. (2006) in separating Salamandrina perspicillata from Salamandrina terdigitata which is found further south. The Salamander undergoes a long development period. Once the female salamander spawns in a body of water, the eggs begin to hatch into larvae, these larvae are unrecognizable until they develop via metamorphosis when they develop their unique markings.
