= Fire belly newt =

Fire belly newts

Scientific classification
- Kingdom: Animalia
- Phylum: Chordata
- Class: Amphibia
- Order: Urodela
- Family: Salamandridae
- Subfamily: Pleurodelinae
- Genus: Cynops; Tschudi, 1839

Genus of amphibians

The fire belly newt or fire newt is a genus (Cynops) of newts native to Japan and China. All of the species show bright yellow or red bellies, but this feature is not unique to this genus. Their skin contains a toxin that can be harmful if ingested.

== Species ==
Species recognized as of October 2019:

Image	Scientific name	Common name	Distribution
	Cynops chenggongensis Kou and Xing, 1983	Chenggong fire belly newt*	Chenggong District of Yunnan
	Cynops cyanurus Liu, Hu, and Yang, 1962	Chuxiong fire-bellied newt or blue-tailed fire belly newt*	Guizhou and Yunnan
	Cynops ensicauda (Hallowell, 1861)	Okinawan sword-tail newt	Ryukyu Archipelago in Japan
	Cynops fudingensis Wu, Wang, Jiang, and Hanken, 2010	Fuding fire belly newt*	Fuding in northeastern Fujian, China
	Cynops glaucus Yuan, Jiang, Ding, Zhang, and Che, 2013		Guangdong, China
	Cynops orientalis (David, 1873)	Chinese fire belly newt*	China
	Cynops orphicus Risch, 1983	Dayang newt or Dayang fire belly newt*	Jiexi County in eastern Guangdong
	Cynops pyrrhogaster (Boie, 1826)	Japanese fire belly newt	Japan
	Cynops wolterstorffi (Boulenger, 1905)	Yunnan lake newt*	Yunnan, China
	Cynops yunnanensis Yang, 1983		Yunnan, China

(A * means that the newt has been moved into the genus Hypselotriton in some classifications)

== Taxonomic controversy ==
The genus Cynops has been suggested to be due for a split, with the Chinese species being placed in a separate genus from the Japanese ones. The species Cynops cyanurus is at the centre of all this. There is much debate about the validity of C. cyanurus and C. chenggongensis. All the known captive animals could be something different from C. cyanurus, as they do not entirely match the original description of the species. The only known animals that match that are animals originating from Chemnitz Zoo, but the F2 animals have not bred well, which could suggest they are in fact a hybrid of C. cyanurus and C. chenggongensis or an undescribed Cynops species.
