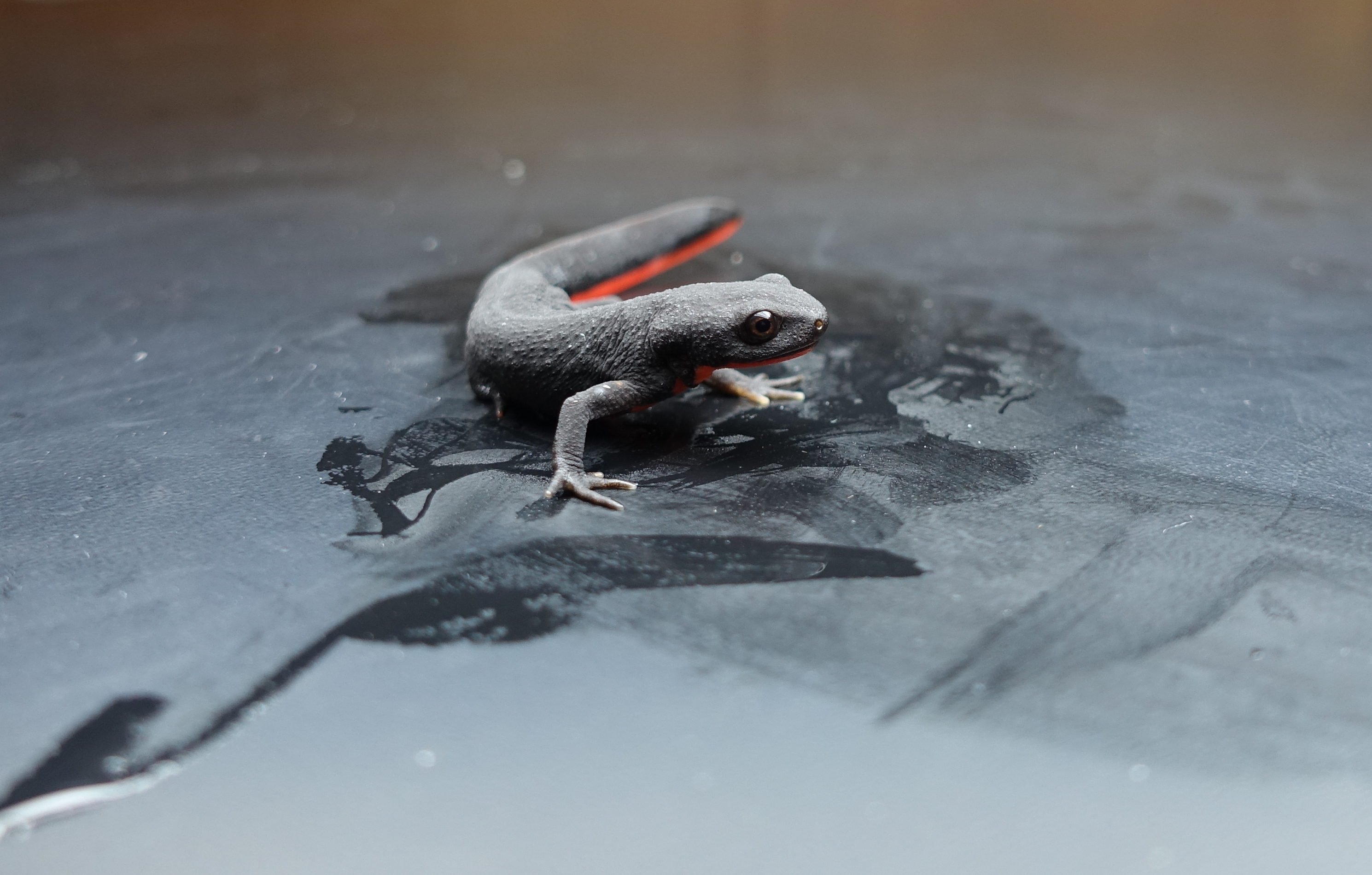

Conservation status
- Least Concern (IUCN 3.1)

Scientific classification
- Kingdom: Animalia
- Phylum: Chordata
- Class: Amphibia
- Order: Urodela
- Family: Salamandridae
- Genus: Cynops
- Species: C. orientalis

Binomial name
- Cynops orientalis (David, 1873)

Synonyms
- Hypselotriton orientalis (David, 1873)

= Chinese fire belly newt =

Species of newt

The Chinese fire belly newt (Cynops orientalis) is a small (2.2–4.0 inches (5.6–10.2 cm)) black newt, with bright-orange aposematic coloration on their ventral sides. C. orientalis is commonly seen in pet stores, where it is frequently confused with the Japanese fire belly newt (C. pyrrhogaster) due to similarities in size and coloration. C. orientalis typically exhibits smoother skin and a rounder tail than C. pyrrhogaster, and has less obvious parotoid glands.

C. orientalis is endemic to subtropical forests in East-Central China and prefers to live in shallow, semiaquatic environments such as abandoned paddies and ponds with dense vegetation. Like many amphibians, the Chinese fire belly newt hibernates. In order to maintain homeostasis, clusters of melanin cells will gather in the liver, darkening the skin of the newt.

gsdf, or Gonadal Soma-Derived Factor, is a gene functioning in testis development within fish, and had previously only been seen in fish until a transcriptome of the Chinese fire belly newt revealed that it is also present in some tetrapods.

== Breeding Ecology ==
Chinese fire belly newts typically spawn in ponds, ditches, wells, and fields, ideally with a water temperature within 15-23°C. Eggs are often deposited on aquatic plants and have a typical incubation time of 13-24 days. Breeding takes place from March to July, with the most spawning occurring in April and May. After the female takes the spermatophore from the male, spawning generally occurs within 65 days. Populations have been found to have a male-biased skewed sex ratio. Sexual maturity of the species is reached within 1 to 3 years.

== Toxicology ==
Chinese fire belly newts are mildly poisonous and excrete toxins through their skin. Consisting primarily of tetrodotoxins, newts of the genus Cynops pose a medically significant threat if enough toxins are consumed, and toxins may cause numbness or irritation on skin contact.

== Gallery ==
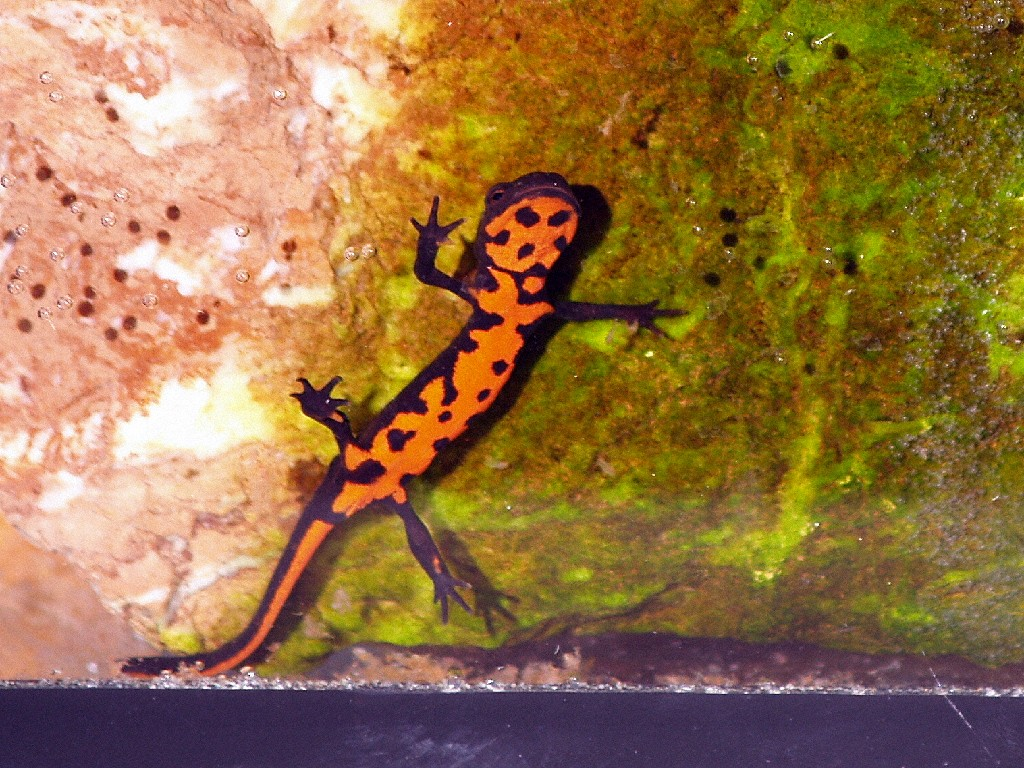
Underside

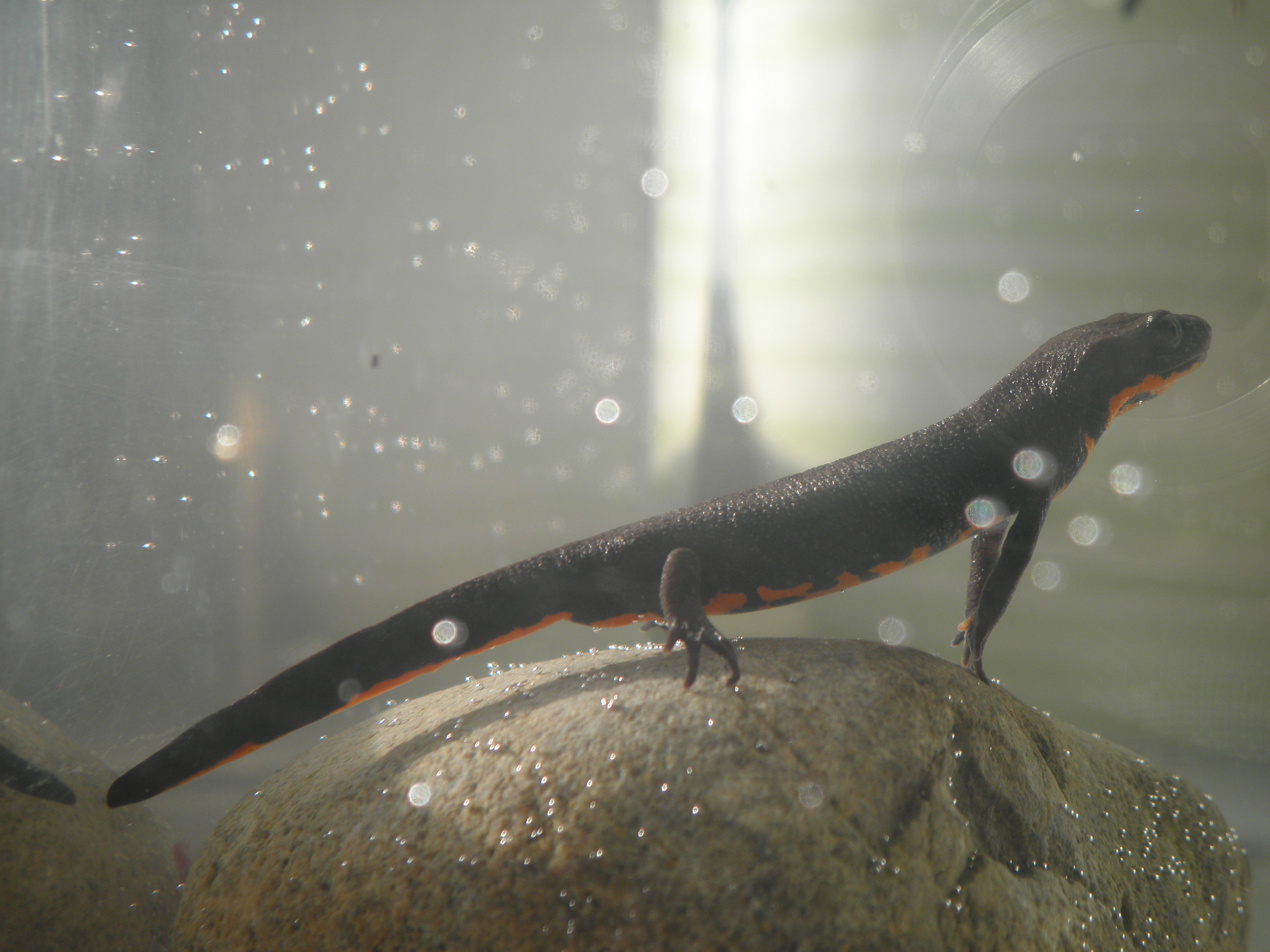
Underwater

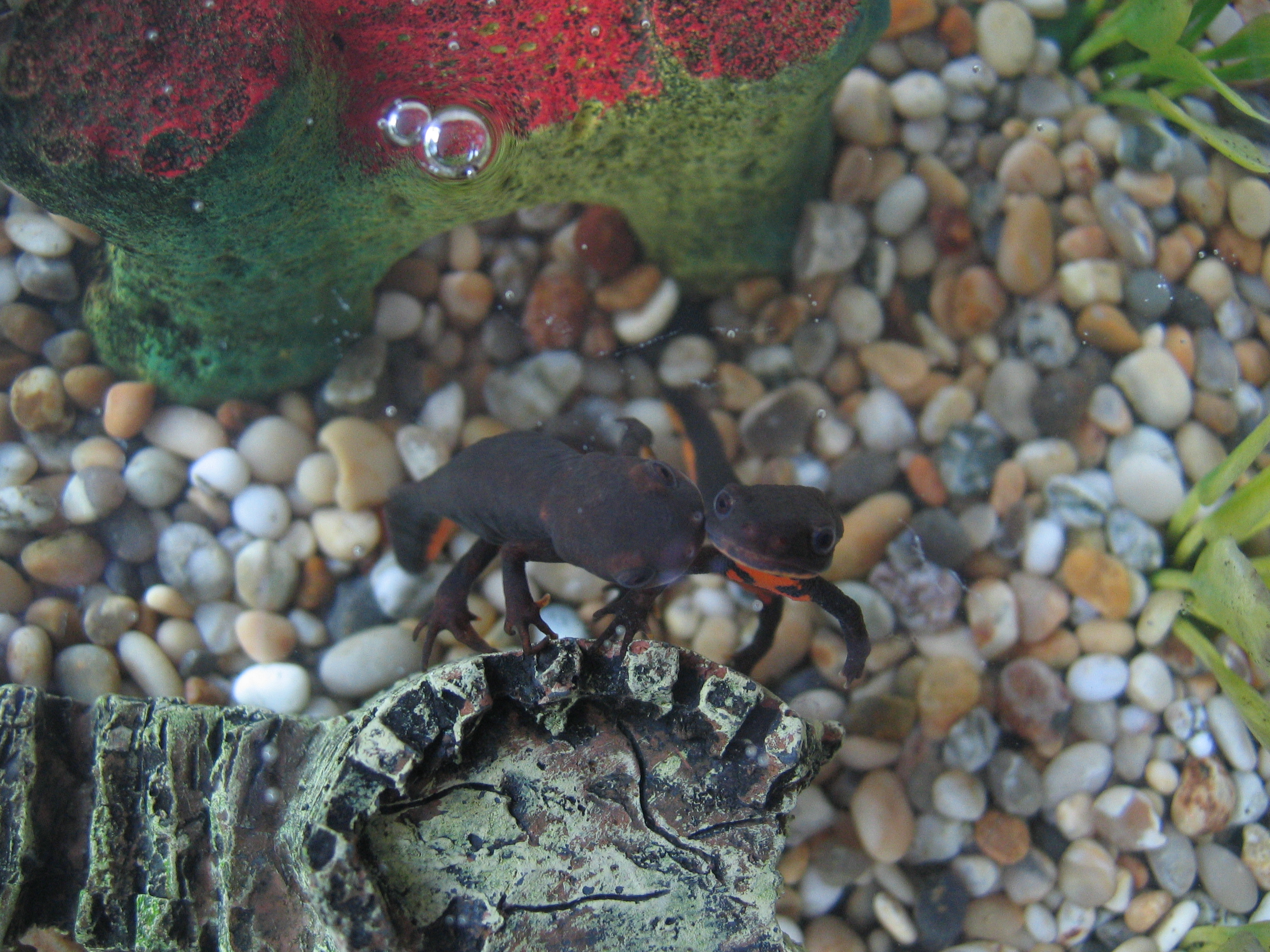
A pair

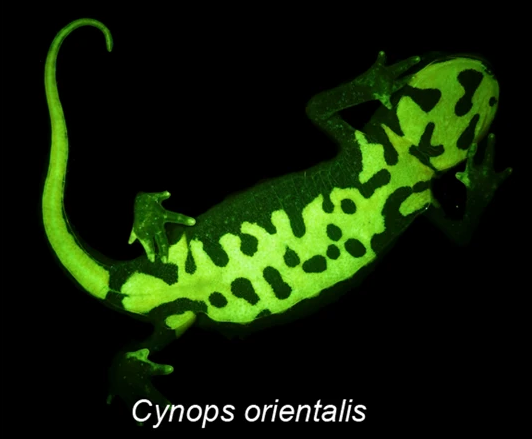
Biofluorescence

== See also ==
- Daazvirus cynopis
