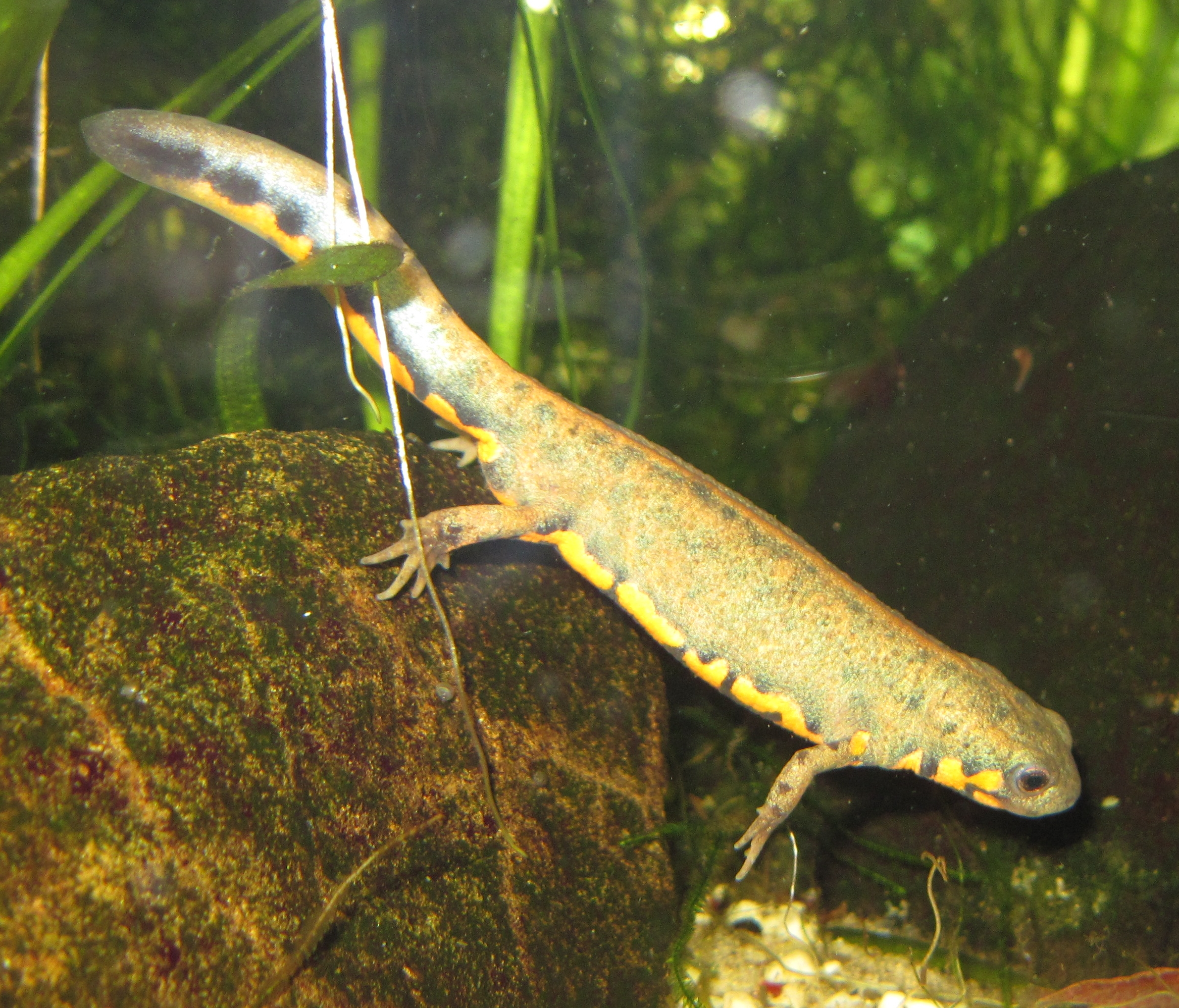

Conservation status
- Least Concern (IUCN 3.1)

Scientific classification
- Kingdom: Animalia
- Phylum: Chordata
- Class: Amphibia
- Order: Urodela
- Family: Salamandridae
- Genus: Cynops
- Species: C. cyanurus

Binomial name
- Cynops cyanurus Liu, Hu & Yang, 1962

= Chuxiong fire-bellied newt =

Species of salamander

The Chuxiong fire-bellied newt (Cynops cyanurus) is a species of salamander in the family Salamandridae that is endemic to China where it is only found in Guizhou and Yunnan. It also occurs in Kunming Lake.

Its natural habitats are subtropical or tropical moist lowland forests, freshwater marshes, intermittent freshwater marshes, and irrigated land. It is threatened by habitat loss.
