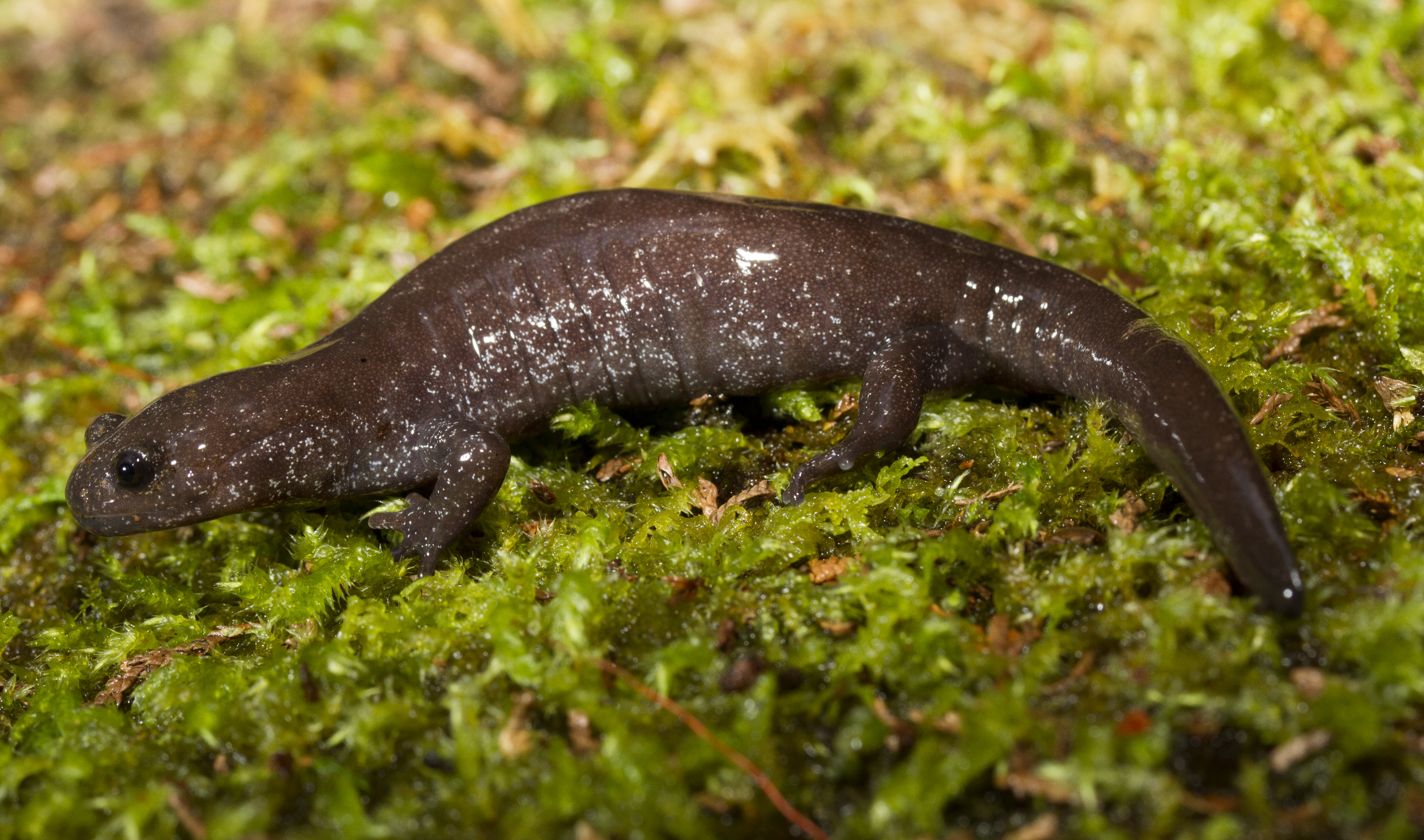

Scientific classification
- Domain: Eukaryota
- Kingdom: Animalia
- Phylum: Chordata
- Class: Amphibia
- Order: Urodela
- Family: Hynobiidae
- Genus: Hynobius
- Species: H. fuca

Binomial name
- Hynobius fuca Lai & Lue, 2008

= Taiwan lesser salamander =

Species of amphibian

Hynobius fucus is an endemic species of Taiwan, which is mainly distributed around the northwest mountain range, approximately an altitude of 1500 meters. It is one of Taiwan’s amphibian most recently discovered amphibians, as well having the lowest altitude habitat of all of Taiwan’s salamanders. Their main feature is that their body is covered in small blue and white dots. The cloaca is 5 cm and body length 8 cm (up to 10 cm). It only has 4 toes in the front and back limbs. Only the Taiwan Hynobius formosanus has the same number of toes as this species. The other types of salamander, including Hynobius arisanensis Maki, Hynobius sonani, and Hynobius glacialis have 5 toes in the hind limbs. This is the one of main methods to differentiate between types of salamander. Currently, the Hynobius fucus is listed as class 1 endangered species.

== Discovery ==
Hynobius fucus was first discovered in 1993 in the Guanwu mountain area in Tai'an Township, Miaoli County. Their body type and color are significantly different to those of other types of salamander. However, as there was only one individual discovered at that time, it was not possible to confirm their ecological niche. After many years of investigation, with many samples collected in 2008 further analysis of variations in the sequence of the mitochondria DNA was carried out in Taiwan by biologists Chun-Hsiang Lai and Kuang-Yang Lu. It was discovered that the Hynobius fucus was an independent species and was published as a new species.

== Distribution ==
Currently, it is known that Hynobius fucus can be found in Xueshan and the northern mountain area with the sightings recorded in the Hsinchu Forest District area, Guanwu area in the Shei-Pa National Park and areas near Peichatienshan at the tail of Xueshan. The Peichatienshan area is known to be the most northern part of its area of distribution, which ranges south to the West Branch of Dalu Forest Road, east to Mingchi and west to Guanwu. Compared to the other type of salamander in Taiwan, the key difference is that they can be found at elevations as low as an altitude of 1310 meters, as seen in the Peichatienshan area.
