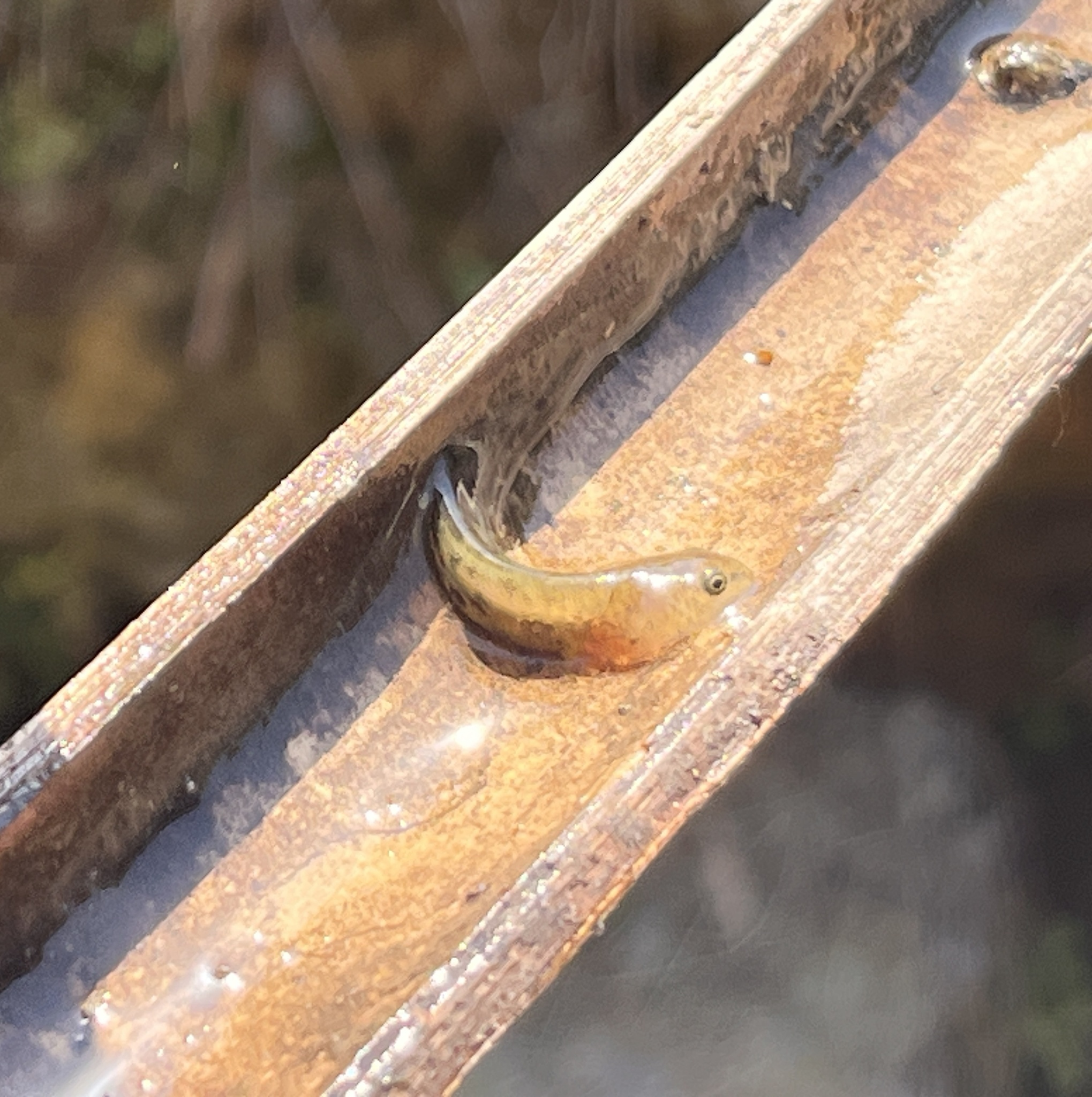

Conservation status
- Least Concern (IUCN 3.1)

Scientific classification
- Kingdom: Animalia
- Phylum: Chordata
- Class: Amphibia
- Order: Urodela
- Family: Hynobiidae
- Genus: Hynobius
- Species: H. yiwuensis

Binomial name
- Hynobius yiwuensis Cai, 1985

= Hynobius yiwuensis =

Species of amphibian

Hynobius yiwuensis, the Yiwu salamander, is a species of salamander in the family Hynobiidae, endemic to Zhejiang, China. Its distribution area is central and eastern Zhejiang, and includes Yiwu that has given it its name. Its natural habitats are subtropical moist lowland forests, rivers, freshwater marshes, intermittent freshwater marshes, arable land, and rural gardens. The Yiwu salamander is threatened by habitat loss.

Adult males have a total length of 83–136 mm (3.3–5.4 in) and females of about 87–117 mm (3.4–4.6 in). The Yiwu salamander is similar to Chinese salamander (H. chinensis) and somewhat larger Amji's salamander (or Zhejiang salamander, H. amjiensis).
