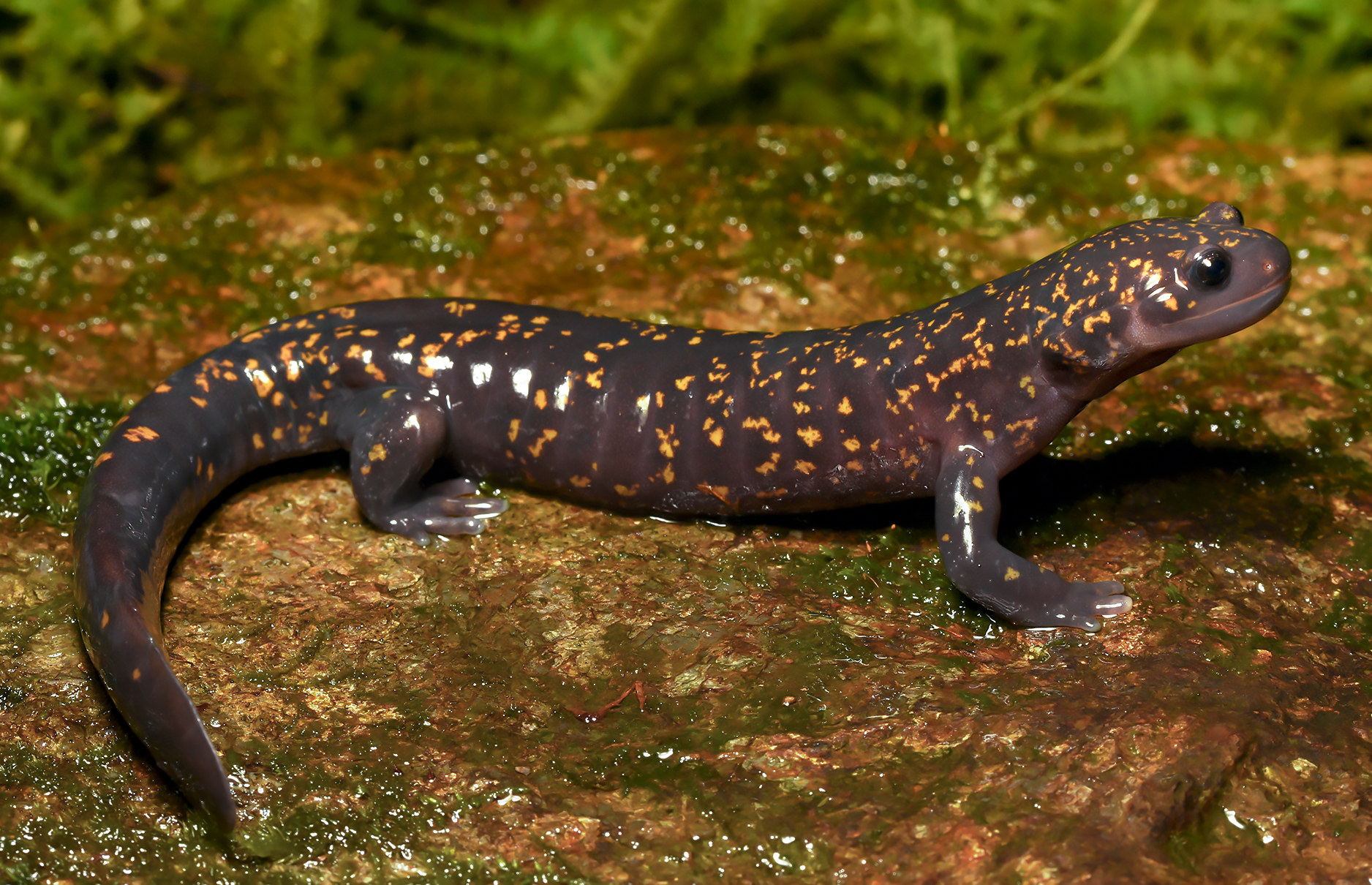
- An adult male

Conservation status
- Vulnerable (IUCN 3.1)

Scientific classification
- Kingdom: Animalia
- Phylum: Chordata
- Class: Amphibia
- Order: Urodela
- Family: Hynobiidae
- Genus: Hynobius
- Species: H. fossigenus

Binomial name
- Hynobius fossigenus Okamiya, Sugawara, Nagano & Poyarkov, 2018
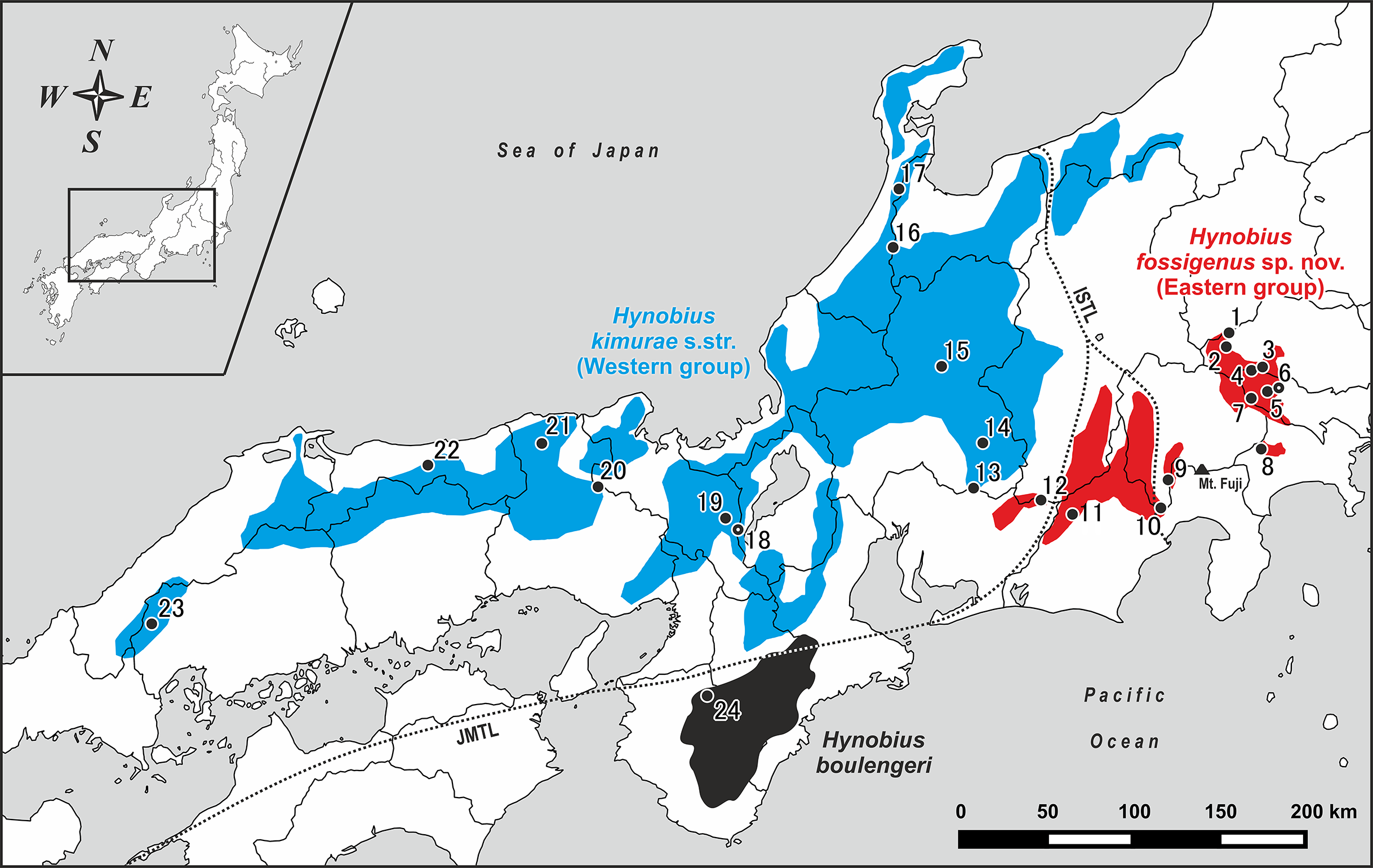
- Its distribution is comprised by the area in red.

Synonyms
- Hynobius luteopunctatus (partim)

= Hynobius fossigenus =

Species of salamander

Hynobius fossigenus is a species of salamander in the family Hynobiidae, and is found in some prefectures in Kantō and Chūbu districts in Japan.

Like all species in the genus Hynobius, it has lungs, its tail is smaller than its body, and it does not have claws on its fingertips. However, characteristics such as its purplish coloration with golden spots, its size, and its use of lotic waters to reproduce make this species different from all the others.

The individuals breed between December and April in mountain streams surrounded by Cryptomeria japonica evergreen forests. After mating, the females lay their eggs in envelopes, which are thick, transparent, and resistant, where they remain for sixty days, when the embryo fully develops in the egg. After hatching, the tadpoles leave the envelope and start living under rocks or at the bottom of streams, completing their metamorphosis within a year. The males become adults around the age of five, while the females become adults around the age of seven.

== Taxonomy ==
The species was described in the scientific journal PeerJ on June 21, 2018, by researchers Hisanori Okamiya, Hirotaka Sugawara, Masahiro Nagano, and Nikolay A. Poyarkov. It is treated as belonging to the genus Hynobius, since it has all the characteristics that together are unique to it, such as: the presence of lungs, having a tail smaller than the body, existence of clawless fingers, and the absence of a clear, visible line on the dorsal region. Speciation can be determined by its large size, by laying its eggs in lotic waters, by the thickness of its egg sac, by its small head and slender body, and by its coloration. Genetic tests were also made from its nuclear and mitochondrial DNA, as well as from mitochondrial 16S RNA, which attested that it is indeed a new species.

The holotype, which was an adult male, was found on March 1, 2018, in a stream on the eastern slope of Mount Hinode in the town of the same name in Japan at an elevation of 679 meters. Also used in the description were 25 paratypes, 17 males and eight females, which were collected during the breeding season in the surrounding regions of the town where the holotype was found.

Since 1986, there were already suspicions that the species existed, when researchers Ikebe, Yamamoto, and Kohno, when analyzing different populations of Hynobius kimurae, noticed a certain difference in the karyotype between individuals, in addition to a phylogenetic proximity of this species with H. boulengeri. Later, in another study in 1991, Ikebe and Kohno detected that this heterogeneity was located in the Kantō district, in addition to noticing several distinctions between the groups, such as the number of eggs per clutch and the biology of the tadpoles. Despite all these dissimilarities, the species was not described at that time, and the data was attributed to mere divergences between distinct population groups.

The species' specific epithet is an agglutination of the Latin words fossa, meaning abyss, and genus, meaning born in, forming an adjective that loosely translates as one born in the abyss, a reference to the fact that it is found near a fault between the North American Plate and the Eurasian Plate.

== Distribution and conservation ==
The species can be found in several prefectures in Japan, such as Gunma, Saitama, Tokyo, Kanagawa, Yamanashi, Shizuoka, Nagano, and Aichi. Many of these populations are isolated from each other by landforms such as massifs. It is present between the altitude range of 300 and 1 100 meters, but is most common between 400 and 900 meters. It is usually close to lotic waters, such as streams, where they lay their eggs. Although the species is not protected by any law or environmental park, with the exception of the Gunma prefecture, it has a wide distribution, and only a few isolated populations may be threatened by anthropogenic actions or habitat loss, making it a least-concern species (LC). It has not yet been assessed by the International Union for Conservation of Nature (IUCN).

== Speciation ==
Evolutionary irradiation

- - - - H. fossigenus
      - H. kimurae
  - H. boulengeri

Cladogram showing its speciation from a specific complex.

Through genetic tests performed on the species, it was possible to determine that speciation occurred from the adaptive radiation of the specific H. kimurae-H. boulengeri complex, which occurred seven million years ago, at the end of the Miocene. Such radiation was caused by the appearance of mountains of volcanic origin, which separated the complex into three different groups: the western, which gave rise to H. kimurae, the central, H. boulengeri, and the eastern, H. kimurae. These populations, being reproductively isolated, and due to natural selection, began to diverge and became separate species.

== Description ==
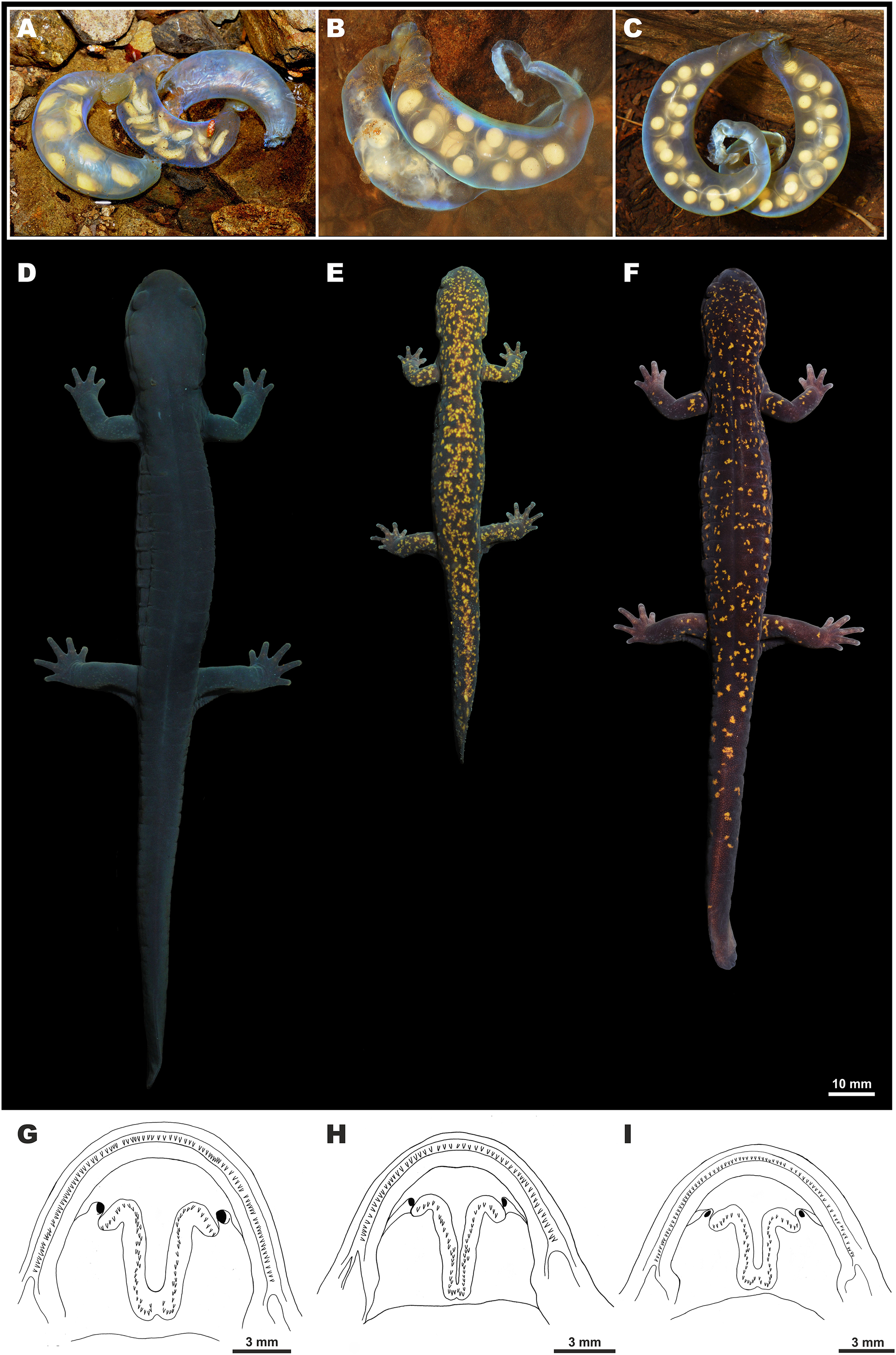
Comparison of eggs, adult individuals and the mouth of H. boulengeri (left), H. fossigenus (center) and H. kimurae (right).

Its average length varies between 66 and 82.5 millimeters, of which only the head, which is oval and broad, accounts for 25%. Its body is slender and cylindrical, with a narrow thorax. The skin of its belly and back is smooth, with microscopic glands scattered all over the body. Its cloaca is slightly swollen, not visible from the ventral or lateral point of view, and is open longitudinally in the shape of a cross, with prominent edges and a reduced sex tubercle. The tail is long, but smaller than the body, ranging in shape from cylindrical to oval, and thicker near the base. Its tongue is broad, elliptical, and convex, and is attached to the lower part of the mouth by the central part. The muzzle is wide, short, and rounded, with small, round nostrils pointed to the side. Its eyes are large and the upper eyelid is well developed. They have prominent, swollen parotoid glands, which extend in the region between the lower jaw and the throat fold. Their dental arch is composed of long, wide, oblique rows of usually 56 U-shaped vomerine teeth.

The coloration of its back varies from brownish-purple to faded black, and it has several small irregularly shaped spots distributed throughout the body, which can be golden yellow or golden orange, the amount of which can vary among individuals. Its legs have a more grayish coloration than the rest of the body. The main sexual dimorphism is the size of the males, which is usually smaller than the females, and the tail, which is usually higher. During the reproductive period, the cloaca of males is usually more protuberant, the opposite of what happens with females, in which the organ is less prominent. During reproduction, in turn, the female's body tends to become more swollen.

It can be differentiated from all Taiwanese congeneric species, such as H. formosanus and H. glacialis by its coloration and large size, as they never exceed 69 millimeters. It can be differentiated from all the lytic species of its genus by the fact that its egg sac is sturdier and has more folds, and has a violet-fluorescent coloration. H. katoi, a sympatric species, can be differentiated by being smaller (60 millimeters) and having fewer teeth, a total of 39. Of the species of its specific complex, it can be differentiated from H. boulengeri by having a completely uniform bluish-black coloration on its back, and from H. kimurae, the phylogenetically closest species, by being larger than the latter, which has 74 millimeters, a longer tail, and by its coloration.

== Reproduction ==
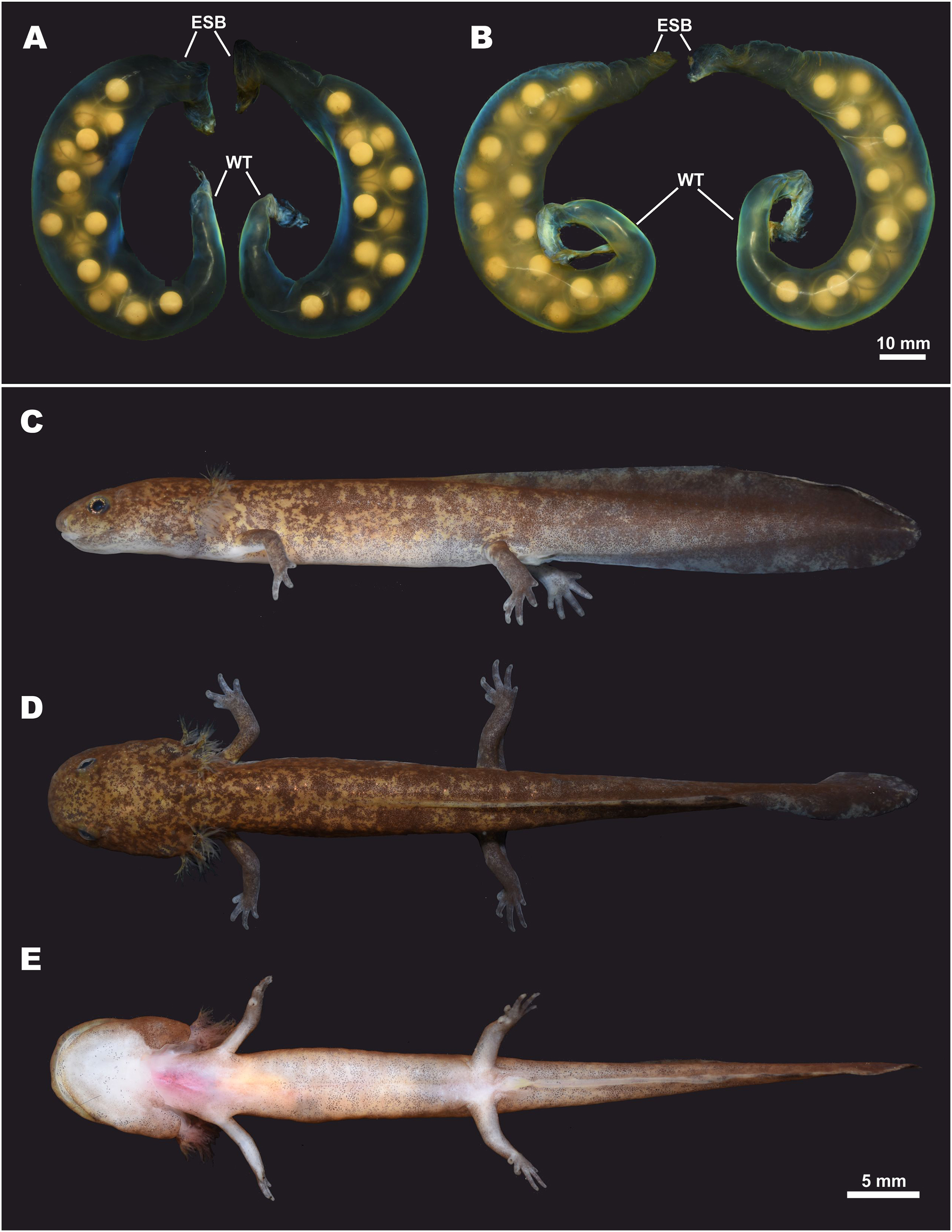
A pair of egg sacs and a tadpole seen from both sides.

The species usually breeds in the spring of small mountain streams, with temperatures never exceeding 20 °C. The preferred places are those less than one and a half meters wide and twenty to thirty centimeters deep, located in evergreen Cryptomeria japonica or mixed forests. Adults begin searching for such sites in November, with the reproductive period lasting from December to April. Mating occurs out of the water, in burrows under rocks and stones. After that, the females lay their eggs in thick, resistant, transparent envelopes, which are attached to the rocks in the stream or waterfalls, where the water is usually between 5.5 and 6.5 °C. Soon after, the female leaves the site, and the male usually stays for a while in the surrounding region where oviposition occurred.

The eggs usually develop for sixty days, and after that time they hatch and the tadpoles come out of the envelope. Outside, they usually feed on amphipods and larvae of tricoptera and ephemeroptera. There are reports of cannibalism, in which the older ones feed on the younger ones. They are easily found under rocks and fallen leaves or in the deepest part of streams. The metamorphosis lasts about a year, and when it is over, the imagos start feeding on spiders, insects, and worms. Males take a minimum of five years to become adults, while females take a little longer, with a minimum of seven years.
