= Hynobius shinichisatoi =

Conservation status
- Endangered (IUCN 3.1)

Scientific classification
- Kingdom: Animalia
- Phylum: Chordata
- Class: Amphibia
- Order: Urodela
- Family: Hynobiidae
- Genus: Hynobius
- Species: H. shinichisatoi

Binomial name
- Hynobius shinichisatoi Nishikawa & Matsui, 2014

Species of amphibian

Hynobius shinichisatoi, the Sobo salamander, has only been found in streams in the Sobo, Katamuki and Okue Biosphere Reserve, Japan. It is black in colour.

It had previously been described as:

- Pachypalaminus boulengeri Satō, 1954
- Hynobius (Pachypalaminus) boulengeri partim Nakamura & Ueno, 1963
- Hynobius boulengeri partim Nishikawa et al., 2001

Thus see also Hynobius boulengeri.
