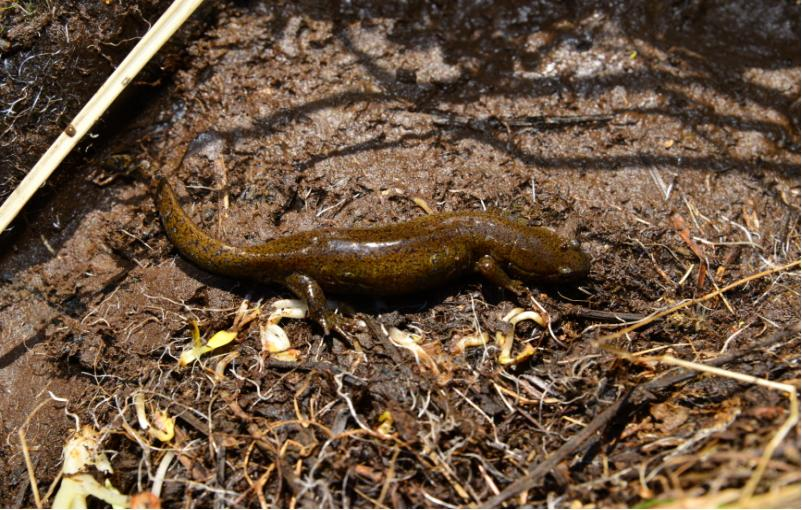

Conservation status
- Vulnerable (IUCN 3.1)

Scientific classification
- Kingdom: Animalia
- Phylum: Chordata
- Class: Amphibia
- Order: Urodela
- Family: Hynobiidae
- Genus: Hynobius
- Species: H. quelpaertensis

Binomial name
- Hynobius quelpaertensis Mori, 1928

= Hynobius quelpaertensis =

Species of amphibian

Hynobius quelpaertensis, the Jeju salamander, also spelled Cheju salamander, is a species of salamander belonging to the family Hynobiidae, the Asiatic salamanders. This salamander is found in South Korea.

== Taxonomy ==
Hynobius quelpaertensis was first formally described in 1928 by the Japanese naturalist Tamezo Mori with its type locality given as Quelpart Island. The Jeju salamander was previously considered a subspecies of the Korean salamander, and was classified as Hynobius leechii quelpaertensis. This salamander is classified in the genus Hynobius, which is the type genus of the subfamily Hyboniinae of the Asiatic salamander family Hynobiidae. This is one of a number closely related species of salamanders in this genus found in Korea which were previously regarded as part of H. leechii.

== Description ==
Hynobius quelpaertensis differs from H. leechii in the length of inner branch of the vomerine tooth-rows are V-shaped and are longer than they are broad); the tail has a dorsal and ventral keel; there is a single costal groove, as opposed to two costal grooves between the flattened toes; and the dorsal and ventral colour is darker. The area of buff on the back is reduced by a fine, blackish speckling, and the ventral surface is greyish.

== Distribution and habitat ==
Hynobius quelpaertensis is endemicto the Republic of Korea where it occurs from the southern tip of the Peninsula and Chindo and Cheju Islands. This salamander is found in hill forests and spawns in stream pools, fallow rice paddies and nearby still-water pools, the larvae developing in the same habitats.

== See also ==
- List of amphibians of Korea
- Korean salamander
