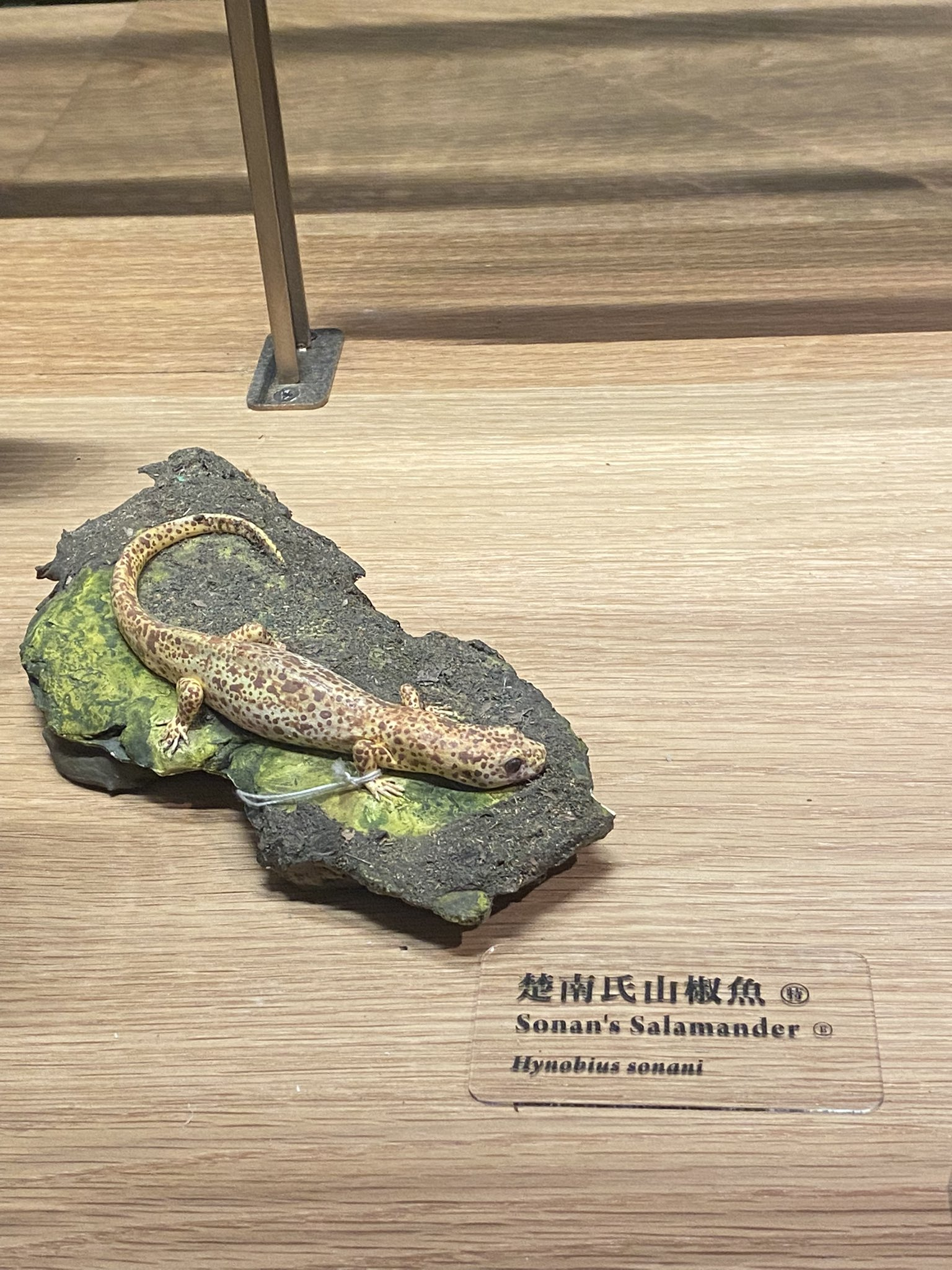
- Model in National Taiwan Museum

Conservation status
- Endangered (IUCN 3.1)

Scientific classification
- Kingdom: Animalia
- Phylum: Chordata
- Class: Amphibia
- Order: Urodela
- Family: Hynobiidae
- Genus: Hynobius
- Species: H. sonani

Binomial name
- Hynobius sonani (Maki, 1922)

Synonyms
- Salamandrella sonani Maki, 1922

= Hynobius sonani =

Species of amphibian

Hynobius sonani, the Taichū salamander, is a species of salamander in the family Hynobiidae, endemic to Taiwan, where it occurs in the Central Mountain Range above 2,750 m (9,020 ft). Its natural habitats are from open alpine habitats to shaded moist evergreen forests; it breeds in streams.

Adult males are 98–129 mm (3.9–5.1 in) and females are 90–105 mm (3.5–4.1 in) in length.

The original specimens used to describe H. sonani (along with H. arisanensis and H. formosanus) were lost in the 1923 Great Kantō earthquake.

Hynobius sonani has very fragmented distribution and is threatened by habitat loss, mainly caused by the development of infrastructure for tourism. It is present in Taroko National Park.

== See also ==
- List of protected species in Taiwan
- List of endemic species of Taiwan
