= Hynobius guabangshanensis =

Conservation status
- Critically Endangered (IUCN 3.1)

Scientific classification
- Kingdom: Animalia
- Phylum: Chordata
- Class: Amphibia
- Order: Urodela
- Family: Hynobiidae
- Genus: Hynobius
- Species: H. guabangshanensis

Binomial name
- Hynobius guabangshanensis Shen, Deng & Wang, 2004

Species of amphibian

Hynobius guabangshanensis is a species of salamander in the family Hynobiidae, endemic to China, as it is only known from the locality from where it was described as a new species to science in 2004, at Guabang Shan Tree Farm in Qiyang County of Hunan Province. Its natural habitats are temperate shrubland, swamps, freshwater marshes, and seasonally flooded agricultural land.

Hynobius guabangshanensis resembles H. amjiensis but is smaller, up to 151 mm in total length and 88 mm in snout-vent length for an adult male.

Hynobius guabangshanensis is potentially threatened by habitat loss, and the IUCN classifies it as critically endangered.
