= Hynobius akiensis =

Conservation status
- Endangered (IUCN 3.1)

Scientific classification
- Kingdom: Animalia
- Phylum: Chordata
- Class: Amphibia
- Order: Urodela
- Family: Hynobiidae
- Genus: Hynobius
- Species: H. akiensis

Binomial name
- Hynobius akiensis Matsui, Okawa, Nishikawa & Tominaga, 2019

Species of asiatic salamander

Hynobius akiensis, the Aki salamander, is a species in the genus Hynobius, which consists of most Asiatic salamanders. It is mainly found in the regions Chugoku, Honshu, and Shikoku in Japan. It is considered an endangered species. Its name comes from the location where it was first found: Akitakata-shi in the Hiroshima Prefecture.

== Description ==
Hynobius akiensis is a small salamander, about 4 to 6 centimeters from the tip of the snout to the cloaca. This species also has longer and wider vomerine teeth compared to its close cousin, Hynobius abuensis. H. akiensis has a tail that is slightly shorter than the rest of its body. Its back is a chocolate-brown, and the underbelly is grayish-brown with silvery-white dots.

Larvae have external gills, a caudal fin, a dorsal fin, a ventral fin, and a tail fin. Their head is broad and round, with slightly protruding eyes. They lack claws on their fingers and toes. Their back is yellow-brown with dark brown markings, and their underbelly is off-white and semi-transparent. They have large black spots on their tail, and golden dots on their tail fin.

== Habitat ==
Hynobius akiensis lives in slow moving or stagnant bodies of water. Its geographic range includes southern central Chugoku, southwestern Honshu, and northwestern Shikoku.

== Breeding ==
Different populations of H. akiensis breed at different times of the year, but most breeding periods fall between December and January. Egg sacs are string-like and wrinkly, in a coiling shape. Depending on the location of the population, estimates of the average clutch size range from 50 to 124, but in some cases, a single clutch can have over 200 eggs.
