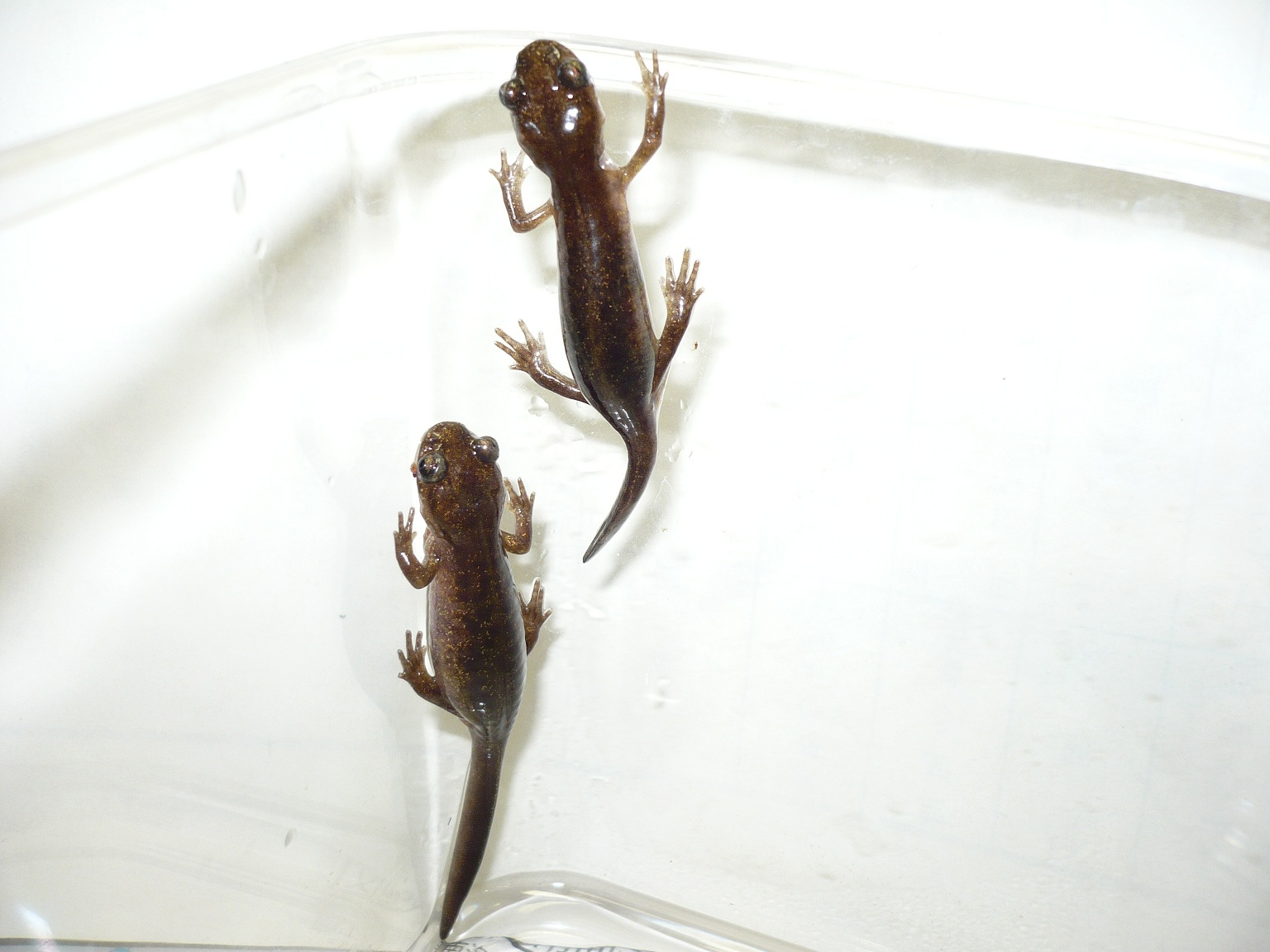

Conservation status
- Least Concern (IUCN 3.1)

Scientific classification
- Kingdom: Animalia
- Phylum: Chordata
- Class: Amphibia
- Order: Urodela
- Family: Hynobiidae
- Genus: Hynobius
- Species: H. retardatus

Binomial name
- Hynobius retardatus (Dunn, 1923)

Synonyms(Dunn, 1923)
- Satobius retardatus

= Ezo salamander =

Species of amphibian

The Ezo salamander (Hynobius retardatus), also known as the Hokkaido salamander, Noboribetsu salamander, or Ezo Sanshouo in Japanese is a species of salamander in the family Hynobiidae. Prior to 1923, the species was also classified by the binomial scientific name Satobius retardatus. H. retardatus is endemic to Japan's northernmost prefecture, the island of Hokkaido. The species is a pond-type salamander, and its natural habitats are temperate forests, temperate shrubland, swamps, freshwater marshes, intermittent freshwater marshes, freshwater springs, irrigated land, canals, and ditches.

In 1923, the species was discovered by American herpetologist Emmett Reid Dunn, the same year the Hida and Amber salamander species were discovered. H. retardatus was first observed on the eastern edge of the Noboribetsu region within Lake Kuttara (Kuttara-ko), although this specific population is now extinct. The name Ezo comes from Yezo, the old name of Hokkaido.

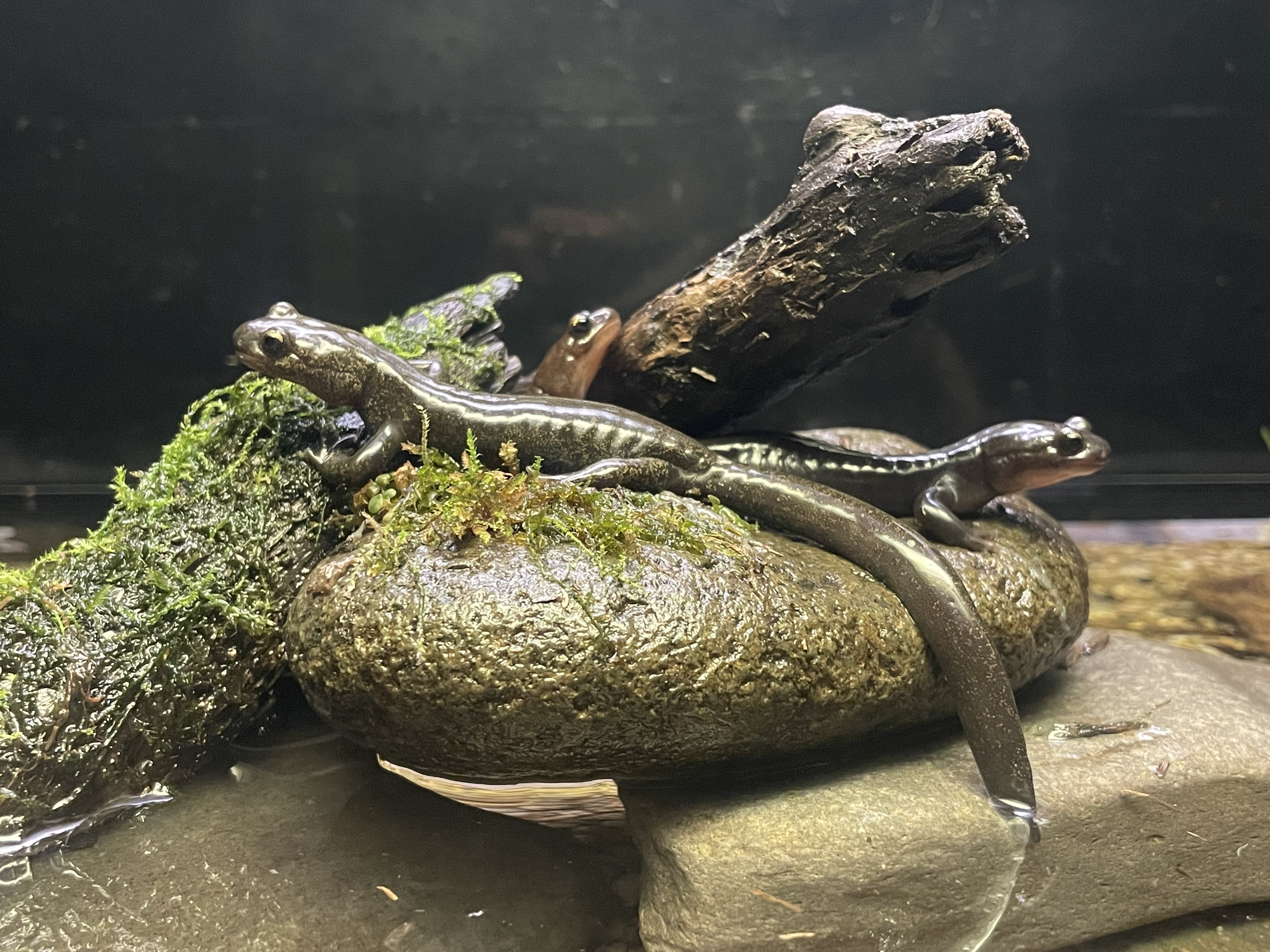
Three Ezo salamanders

== Description ==
Adult Ezo salamanders can reach 115–200 mm (4.52-7.87 inch) in length. Hindlimbs of the terrestrial adults have five digits. Adults are dark brown in coloration and aquatic juveniles are a similar dark brown sprinkled with golden flecks across the body.

The Ezo salamander is distantly related to others of its genus. A unique characteristic of this species is that individuals have only 20 chromosome pairs, a significantly smaller amount than the 28-29 pairs found in other salamanders of the Hynobius genus.

== Habitat and distribution ==
The Ezo salamander lives in alpine forests and grasslands only on the island of Hokkaido, and is not found on any of the surrounding islands.

The Ezo salamander likely migrated to the island of Hokkaido from continental Eurasia via land bridges. These bridges connected the two regions until the end of the last glacial period, approximately 10,000 years ago. The divergence of H. retardatus vastly predates this migration, occurring between 14 and 18 million years ago. This time frame encompasses parts of the Miocene, Pliocene, and Pleistocene epochs, where the Japanese archipelago first rose from the Pacific Ocean.

== Population structure, speciation, and phylogeny ==
Geographically separated populations of H. retardatus show significant differences in morphology, with some individuals of the Obihiro-shi population in eastern Hokkaido displaying larger adult body size as well as larger egg sac size and diameter. These differences in size have compelled some researchers to tentatively separate the species into "large" and "common" morphs. Despite the visual morphological difference between large and common types, they are not genetically distinct enough to be separated by taxonomic rank. Morphological differences between H. retardatus individuals may be attributable to inducible defenses of their prey and the prevalence of cannibalism between larvae of the species.

== Home range and territoriality ==
H. retardatus is an abundant endemic species on the island of Hokkaido, with a wide range across the island. They are the northernmost species of the Hynobius genus in Japan. Within Japan, populations have been found in the Iburi subprefecture, Kayabe district, the cities of Obihiro, Chitose, Hakodate, and Kitami, as well as the towns of Erimo, Teshio, and the Nopporo Shinrin Kōen Prefectural Natural Park.

Ezo salamanders can only live within lentic freshwater habitats, so their mobility is restricted, and separate populations show very low levels of gene flow. However, relatively high levels of gene flow have been recorded between the Nopporo and Kitami populations despite the mountain range separating them.

== Diet ==
Adults of the species feed on invertebrates like snails and worms. H. retardatus larvae are known to consume the tadpoles of multiple frog species such as the Japanese brown frog (Rana pirica) and the Hokkaido frog, as well as sewage worms (Tubifex), gammaridean amphipods, caddisfly larvae, and possibly larvae of Siberian salamanders. Cannibalism by the larvae is not uncommon when prey items are scarce. H. retardatus, like other salamander species, is a gape-limited predator that swallows its prey whole.

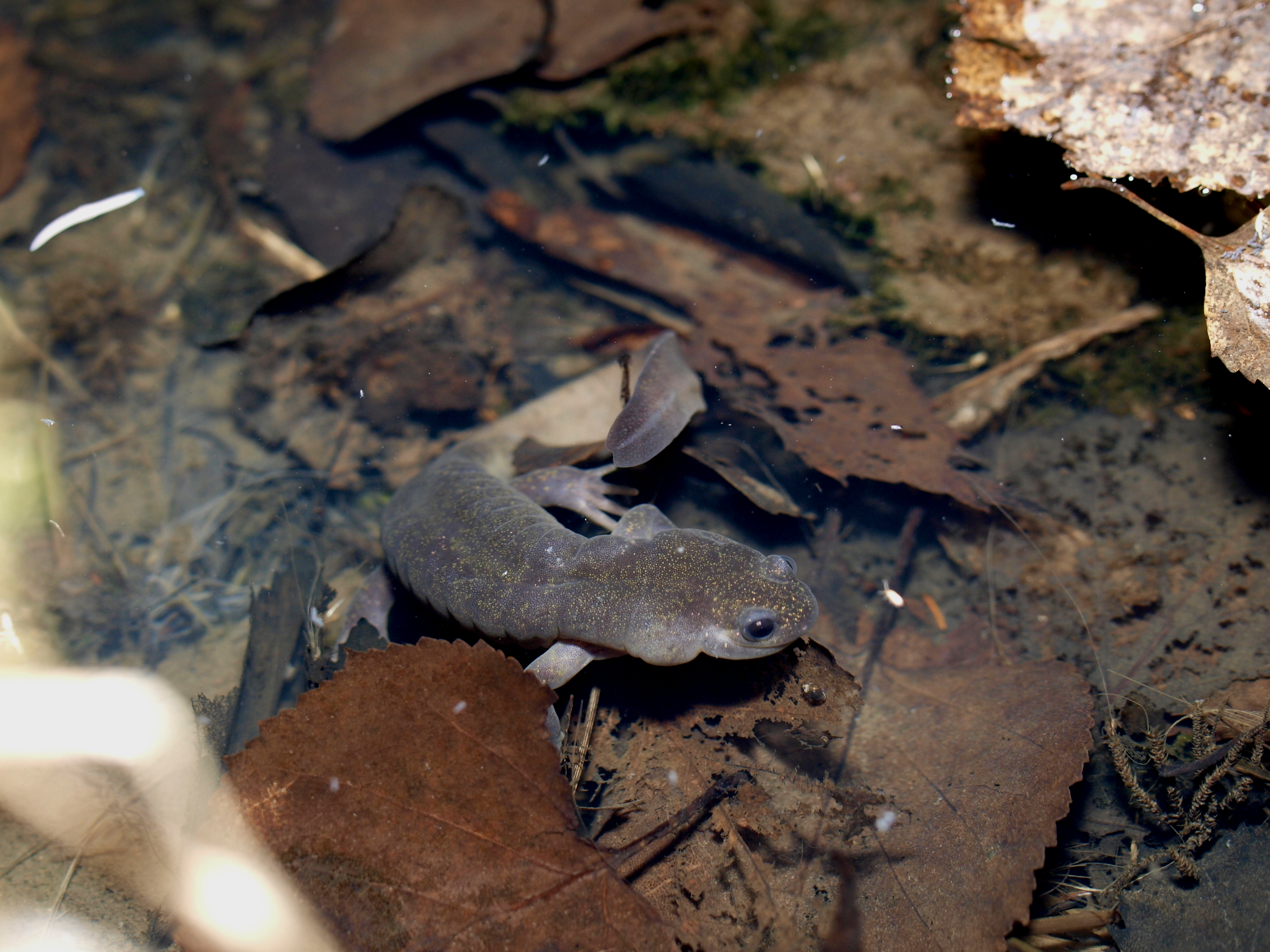
Ezo salamander in shallow water

=== Cannibalism ===
Aquatic larvae of H. retardatus are known to utilize cannibalism under specific circumstances influenced by availability and inducible defenses of prey as well as asymmetry of size between conspecific larvae. Some Japanese brown frog tadpoles (R. pirica) have adapted thicker bodies to reduce predation by H. retardatus larvae (as they are gape-limited). In response, Ezo salamander larvae are capable of developing into larger morphs with longer bodies, wider heads, and a relatively greater gape, allowing them to consume larger prey. However, as the difference between smaller and larger H. retardatus larvae increases, the propensity towards cannibalism increases as well. Ezo salamanders seem to be capable of distinguishing between conspecific and heterospecific prey, with a preference for heterospecific prey, but higher frequencies of the thicker R. pirica tadpoles and larger asymmetries between H. retardatus larvae forces the larger morph larvae into cannibalism.

H. retardatus larvae artificially fed exclusively conspecific prey were found to more likely develop into the cannibalistic morph when subjected to high-density conditions. These larvae developed larger bodies and larger relative head widths. For larvae fed sewage worms (Tubifex)--a heterospecific prey—under the high-density conditions, head width increased, but body size remained unchanged. Development into the cannibalistic morph is thus influenced by both chemical and visual cues of density and diet. Observations of wild populations revealed that cannibalistic dimorphism within ponds was limited to early periods of development and disappeared as development progressed.

== Reproduction and life cycle ==
The breeding season of the Ezo salamander runs from April to May, with eggs hatching between early- and mid-May. The species has a biphasic life cycle, with the first stage of life spent as aquatic larvae and the second, after metamorphosis, spent on land as a terrestrial adult.

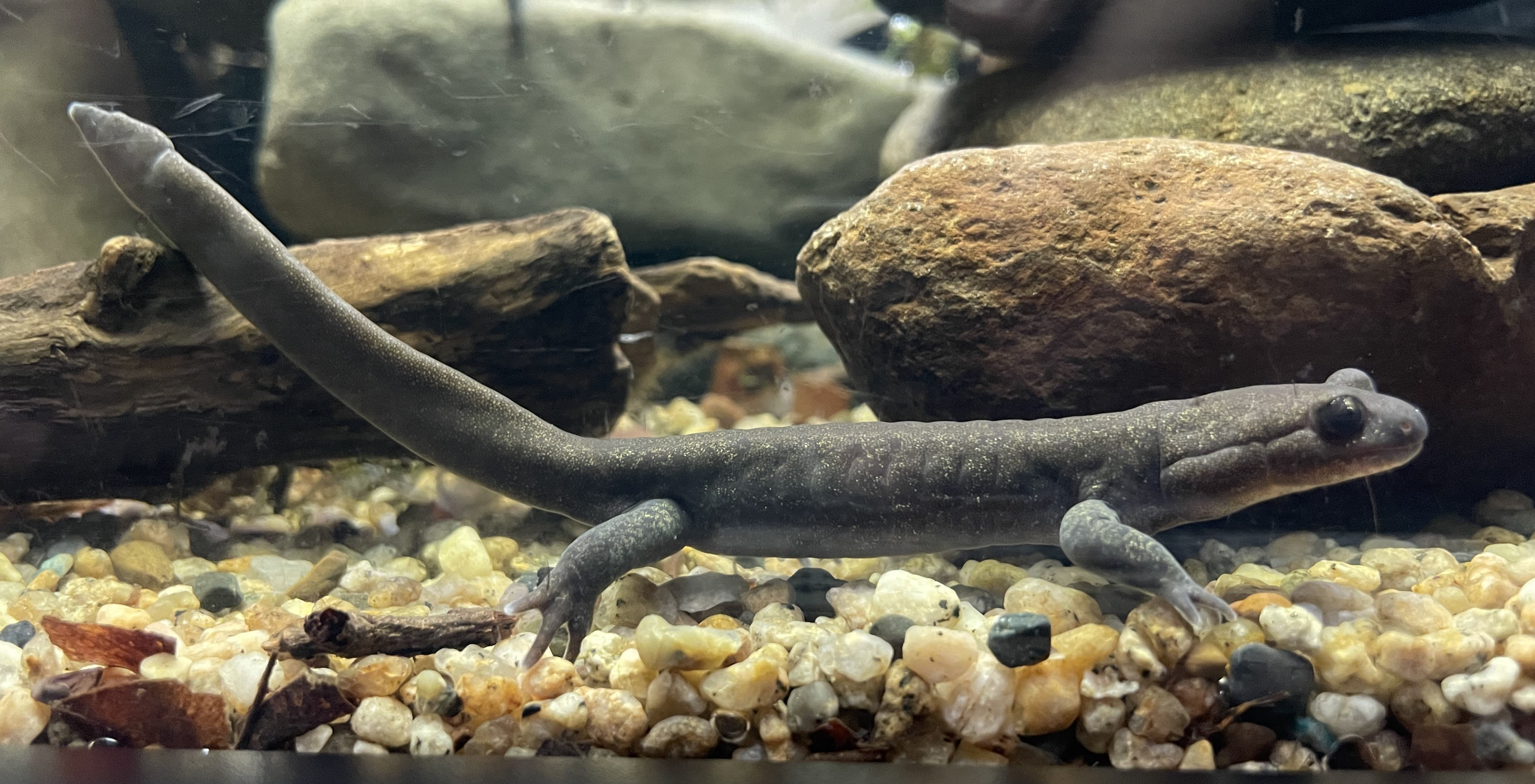
Ezo salamander in aquarium

=== Development ===
During their juvenile stages, Ezo salamanders develop interdigital membranes on their fore- and hindlimbs. The forelimbs develop first, as is the same of other salamander species that spawn aquatic larvae. The earliest stages of forelimb development showcase morphology similar to a spear, with symmetrical digits developing on either side of the pointed interdigital membrane until the limb adopts three digits and the membrane disappears. This trait is commonly seen in other aquatic larvae that live within ponds but is absent in larvae that develop in quickly flowing streams.

=== Paedomorphosis ===
The population of H. retardatus found within Lake Kuttara exhibited paedomorphosis, a mechanism where adults maintain larval features even after metamorphosing and reaching sexual maturity. While this mechanism is common in many salamander species—found in nine of the ten salamander families—it is rare in the Hynobiidae family, recorded only in H. retardatus and the Longdong stream salamander (Batrachuperus londongensis). Paedomorphosis of the Ezo salamander was first recorded in 1924 within the Lake Kuttara population and was last encountered in 1932. These H. retardatus individuals were sexually mature but morphologically similar to the larvae of the species, with features such as external gills and caudal fins. The exact year of extinction for this population is unknown, but can likely be attributed to the introduction of salmon into the lake habitat.

After the loss of the Lake Kuttara population, paedomorphy in H. retardatus was not documented for almost 100 years and the trait was presumed to have gone extinct. However, on December 1, 2020, and April 5, 2021, three male paedomorph-like individuals were documented in the Iburi subprefecture within 40 km of Lake Kuttara. The three individuals were 14% smaller than metamorphosed males when comparing snout-vent lengths and 2.26 times larger than the aquatic larvae of the species. Measurements of head size and tail shape for the paedomorph-like males produced results intermediate between adult males and larvae. Two of the three males also exhibited three small external gill ramus pairs and vomerine teeth arranged in an inverted "V" as seen on H. retardatus larvae. The same two males also had mobile spermatozoa, confirming that they had already reached sexual maturity and were, thus, paedomorphic.

== Physiology ==
H. retardatus possess a rare trait among amphibians where the transition from larval hemoglobin to the adult type occurs independently of thyroid activity and can occur for up to two years, well past the actual metamorphosis period. During early stages of development, the liver of H. retardatus is the main erythropoietic organ, producing red blood cells. The spleen then takes over further into development but before the hemoglobin transition. After the transition the spleen resumes its function as the main source of erythropoiesis, and it continues to do so throughout the life of an H. retardatus individual. The transition from juvenile to adult hemoglobin also occurs entirely within a single population of red blood cells, in contrast to the complete replacement of red blood cells from larval to adult type found in many other amphibian species. A similar method of hemoglobin switching has been seen in mice.

== Conservation ==
Ezo salamanders are commonly sold through the internet as part of the pet trade. They are also endangered by the introduction of invasive species, as seen in the extinction of the Lake Kuttara population, which was likely due to the introduction of salmon into the lake. Raccoons, a non-native species introduced to Japan by humans, are known to prey upon H. retardatus. Urbanization and modification of wetlands and similar habitats have caused population decline for Ezo salamanders living in habitats in close proximity to humans.
