= Hakuba salamander =

Conservation status
- Endangered (IUCN 3.1)

Scientific classification
- Kingdom: Animalia
- Phylum: Chordata
- Class: Amphibia
- Order: Urodela
- Family: Hynobiidae
- Genus: Hynobius
- Species: H. hidamontanus

Binomial name
- Hynobius hidamontanus Matsui, 1987

Synonyms
- Hynobius tenuis Nambu, 1991

Species of amphibian

The Hakuba salamander or Japanese mountain salamander (Hynobius hidamontanus) is a species of salamander in the family Hynobiidae. This salamander is also synonymous with the mountain salamander (Hynobius tenuis). It is endemic to Japan. Its natural habitats are temperate forests, rivers, swamps, freshwater springs, and plantations. It is threatened by habitat loss.
