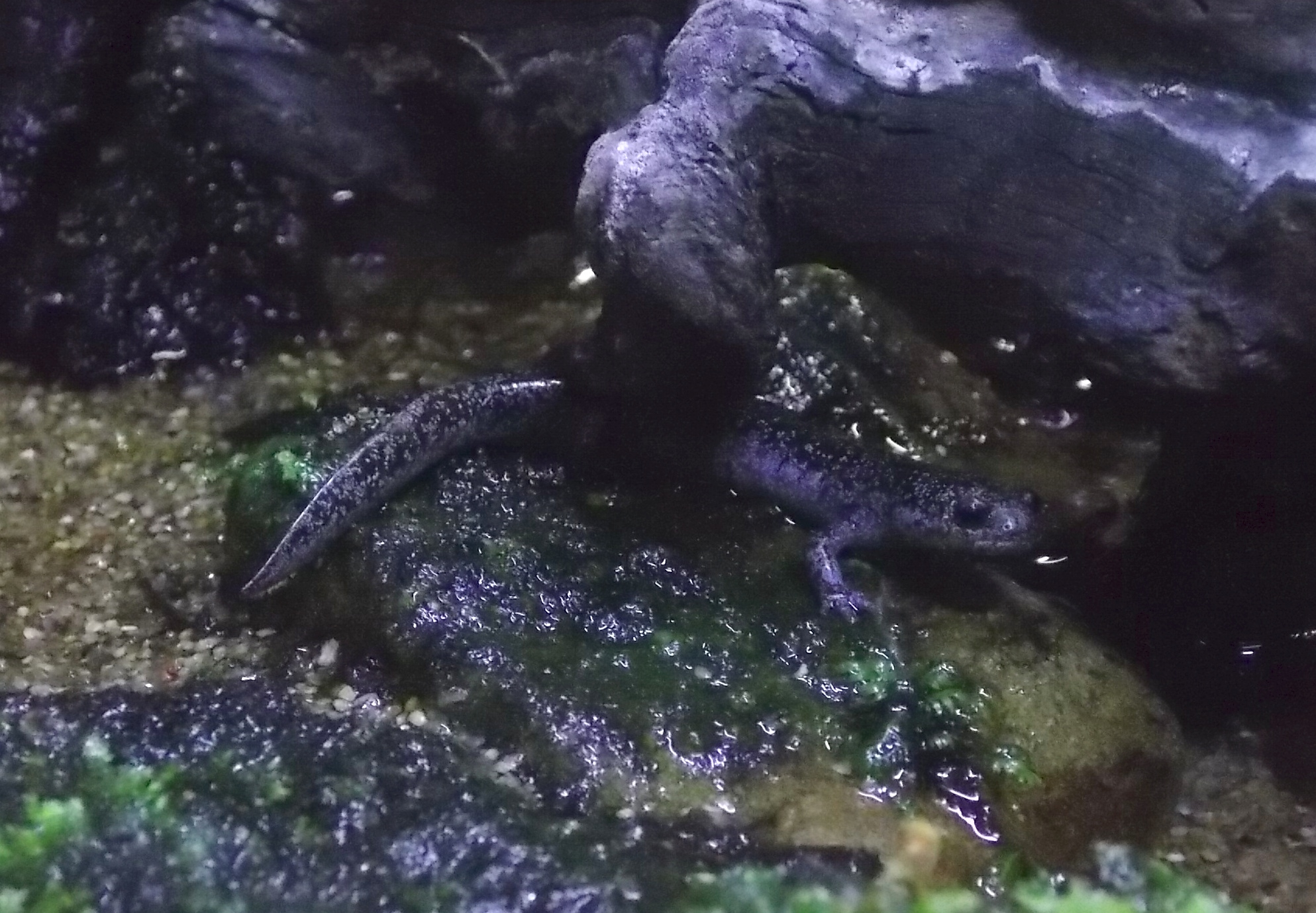

Conservation status
- Vulnerable (IUCN 3.1)

Scientific classification
- Kingdom: Animalia
- Phylum: Chordata
- Class: Amphibia
- Order: Urodela
- Family: Hynobiidae
- Genus: Hynobius
- Species: H. tokyoensis

Binomial name
- Hynobius tokyoensis Tago, 1931

= Tokyo salamander =

Species of amphibian

The Tokyo salamander (Hynobius tokyoensis) is a species of salamander in the family Hynobiidae, endemic to Japan. Its natural habitats are temperate forests, freshwater springs, arable land, irrigated land, and canals and ditches. It is threatened by habitat loss and raccoon (araiguma) predation. Many different species of amphibian have unbalanced sex ratios. This trend is no different in Hynobius Tokyoensis; the sex ratio between males and females is about 1.5:1. Although this does not play as large of a role as habitat destruction when it comes to the decline of this species, it is still significant. Considering their environmental preferences, they are usually found in paddy fields. Mid-Summer drainage from these fields hinders the population's ability to thrive as this would occur before these populations could complete metamorphosis.
