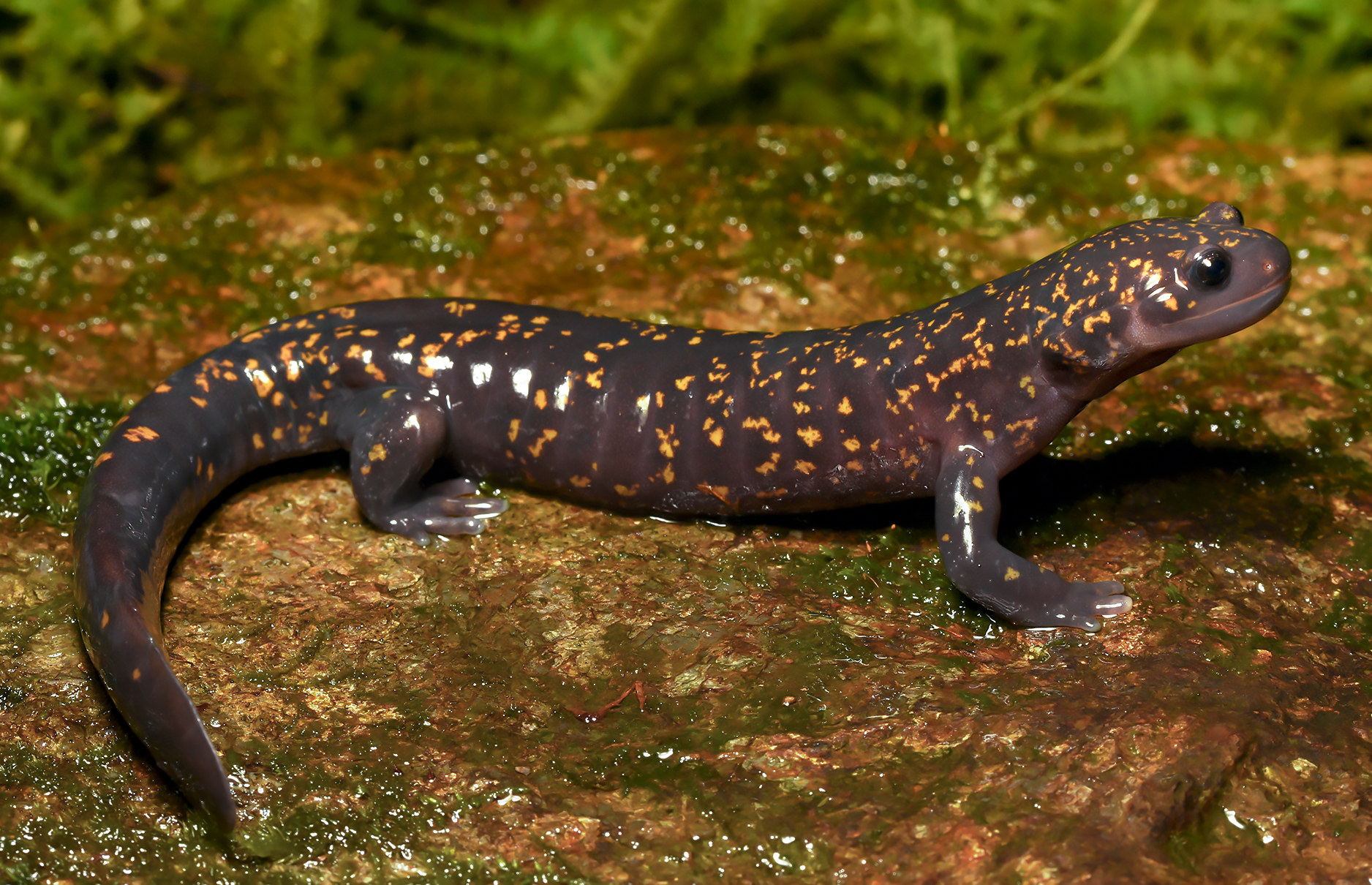
- Hynobius fossigenus

Scientific classification
- Kingdom: Animalia
- Phylum: Chordata
- Class: Amphibia
- Order: Urodela
- Suborder: Cryptobranchoidea
- Family: Hynobiidae; Cope, 1859

Genera
- Hynobius; Batrachuperus; Liua; Onychodactylus †Changchunerpeton; Pachyhynobius; Paradactylodon; Pseudohynobius; Ranodon; Salamandrella

= Asiatic salamander =

Asiatic salamanders Temporal range: Campanian–Recent

Family of amphibians

The Asiatic salamanders (family Hynobiidae) are primitive salamanders found all over Asia, and in European Russia. They are closely related to the giant salamanders (family Cryptobranchidae), with which they form the suborder Cryptobranchoidea. About half of hynobiids currently described are endemic to Japan, but their range also covers parts of China, Russia, Afghanistan and Iran.

Hynobiid salamanders practice external fertilization, or spawning. And, unlike other salamander families which reproduce internally, male hynobiids focus on egg sacs rather than females during breeding. The female lays two egg sacs at a time, each containing up to 70 eggs. Parental care is common.

A few species have very reduced lungs, or no lungs at all. Larvae can sometimes have reduced external gills if they live in cold and very oxygen-rich water.

Fossils of hynobiids are known from the Campanian to the present in Asia and Eastern Europe, though fossils of cryptobranchoids more closely related to hynobiids than to giant salamanders extend back to the Middle Jurassic.

== Phylogeny ==
Cladograms based on the work of Pyron and Wiens (2011) and modified using Mikko Haaramo

- - ?†Iridotriton hechti
  - ?†Liaoxitriton
  - ?Protohynobius puxiongensis
  - Onychodactylus
  - - - Pachyhynobius shangchengensis
      - Salamandrella
    - Hynobiinae
      - Hynobius
      - - - Ranodon sibiricus
          - Paradactylodon
        - - Batrachuperus
          - - Liua
            - Pseudohynobius

== Classification ==
Currently, 100 species are known. These genera make up the Hynobiidae:

- Genus †Changchunerpeton
  - †Changchunerpeton nonganensis Jia, 2026

Subfamily Hynobiinae

- Genus Afghanodon
  - Afghanodon mustersi (Smith, 1940)
- Genus Batrachuperus (Chinese stream salamanders)
  - Batrachuperus karlschmidti Liu, 1950
  - Batrachuperus londongensis Liu and Tian, 1978
  - Batrachuperus pinchonii (David, 1872)
  - Batrachuperus tibetanus Schmidt, 1925
  - Batrachuperus yenyuanensis Liu, 1950
- Genus Hynobius - (Asian salamanders)
  - Hynobius abei Sato, 1934
  - Hynobius abuensis Matsui, Okawa, Nishikawa, and Tominaga, 2019
  - Hynobius akiensis Matsui, Okawa, and Nishikawa, 2019
  - Hynobius amabensis Sugawara and Nagano, 2023
  - Hynobius amakusaensis Nishikawa and Matsui, 2014
  - Hynobius amjiensis Gu, 1992
  - Hynobius arisanensis Maki, 1922
  - Hynobius bakan Matsui, Okawa, and Nishikawa, 2019
  - Hynobius bambusicolus Wang, Othman, Qiu and Borzée, 2023
  - Hynobius boulengeri (Thompson, 1912)
  - Hynobius chinensis Günther, 1889
  - Hynobius dunni Tago, 1931
  - Hynobius formosanus Maki, 1922
  - Hynobius fossigenus Okamiya, Sugawara, Nagano, and Poyarkov, 2018
  - Hynobius fucus Lai and Lue, 2008
  - Hynobius geiyoensis Sugawara, Naito, Iwata, and Nagano, 2022
  - Hynobius geojeensis Min and Borzée, 2021
  - Hynobius glacialis Lai and Lue, 2008
  - Hynobius guabangshanensis Shen, 2004
  - Hynobius guttatus Tominaga, Matsui, Tanabe, and Nishikawa, 2019
  - Hynobius hidamontanus Matsui, 1987
  - Hynobius hirosei Lantz, 1931
  - Hynobius ikioi Matsui, Nishikawa, and Tominaga, 2017
  - Hynobius iwami Matsui, Okawa, Nishikawa, and Tominaga, 2019
  - Hynobius katoi Matsui, Kokuryo, Misawa, and Nishikawa, 2004
  - Hynobius kimurae Dunn, 1923
  - Hynobius kuishiensis Tominaga, Matsui, Tanabe, and Nishikawa, 2019
  - Hynobius kunibiki Sugawara, Iwata, Yamashita, and Nagano, 2021
  - Hynobius leechii Boulenger, 1887
  - Hynobius lichenatus Boulenger, 1883
  - Hynobius maoershanensis Zhou, Jiang, and Jiang, 2006
  - Hynobius mikawaensis Matsui, Misawa, Nishikawa, and Shimada, 2017
  - Hynobius miyazakiensis Sugawara, Nagano, and Sueyoshi, 2023
  - Hynobius naevius (Temminck and Schlegel, 1838)
  - Hynobius nagatoensis Sugawara, Tahara, Matsukoji, and Nagano, 2022
  - Hynobius nebulosus (Temminck and Schlegel, 1838)
  - Hynobius nigrescens Stejneger, 1907
  - Hynobius nihoensis Sugawara, Nagano, and Nakazono, 2022
  - Hynobius notialis Min and Borzée, 2021
  - Hynobius okiensis Sato, 1940
  - Hynobius oni Kanamori, Nishikawa, Matsui, and Tanabe, 2022
  - Hynobius osumiensis Nishikawa and Matsui, 2014
  - Hynobius oyamai Tominaga, Matsui, and Nishikawa, 2019
  - Hynobius owariensis Sugawara, Fujitani, Seguchi, Sawahata, and Nagano, 2022
  - Hynobius perplicatus Min and Borzée, 2021
  - Hynobius quelpaertensis Mori, 1928
  - Hynobius retardatus Dunn, 1923
  - Hynobius sematonotos Tominaga, Matsui, and Nishikawa, 2019
  - Hynobius sengokui Matsui, Misawa, Yoshikawa, and Nishikawa, 2022
  - Hynobius setoi Matsui, Tanabe, and Misawa, 2019
  - Hynobius setouchi Matsui, Okawa, Tanabe, and Misawa, 2019
  - Hynobius shinichisatoi Nishikawa and Matsui, 2014
  - Hynobius sonani (Maki, 1922)
  - Hynobius stejnegeri Dunn, 1923
  - Hynobius sumidai Sugawara, Naito, Iwata, and Nagano, 2022
  - Hynobius takedai Matsui and Miyazaki, 1984
  - Hynobius tokyoensis Tago, 1931
  - Hynobius tosashimizuensis Sugawara, Watabe, Yoshikawa, and Nagano, 2018
  - Hynobius tsuensis Abé, 1922
  - Hynobius tsurugiensis Tominaga, Matsui, Tanabe, and Nishikawa, 2019
  - "Hynobius" turkestanicus Nikolskii, 1910
  - Hynobius unisacculus Min, Baek, Song, Chang, and Poyarkov, 2016
  - Hynobius utsunomiyaorum Matsui and Okawa, 2019
  - Hynobius vandenburghi Dunn, 1923
  - Hynobius yangi Kim, Min, and Matsui, 2003
  - Hynobius yiwuensis Cai, 1985
- Genus Liua (Wushan salamanders)
  - Liua shihi (Liu, 1950)
  - Liua tsinpaensis (Liu and Hu, 1966)
- Genus Pachyhynobius (stout salamanders)
  - Pachyhynobius shangchengensis Fei, Qu, and Wu, 1983
- Genus Paradactylodon (Middle Eastern stream salamanders)
  - Paradactylodon persicus (Eiselt and Steiner, 1970)
- Genus Pseudohynobius
  - Pseudohynobius flavomaculatus (Hu and Fei, 1978)
  - Pseudohynobius guizhouensis Li, Tian, and Gu, 2010
  - Pseudohynobius jinfo Wei, Xiong, and Zeng, 2009
  - Pseudohynobius kuankuoshuiensis Xu and Zeng, 2007
  - Pseudohynobius puxiongensis (Fei and Ye, 2000)
  - Pseudohynobius shuichengensis Tian, Gu, Li, Sun, and Li, 1998
- Genus Ranodon (Semirichensk salamanders)
  - Ranodon sibiricus Kessler, 1866
- Genus Salamandrella (Siberian salamanders)
  - Salamandrella keyserlingii Dybowski, 1870
  - Salamandrella tridactyla Nikolskii, 1905

Subfamily Onychodactylinae

- Genus Onychodactylus (clawed salamanders)
  - Onychodactylus fischeri (Boulenger, 1886)
  - Onychodactylus fuscus Yoshikawa and Matsui, 2014
  - Onychodactylus intermedius Nishikawa and Matsui, 2014
  - Onychodactylus japonicus (Houttuyn, 1782)
  - Onychodactylus kinneburi Yoshikawa, Matsui, Tanabe, and Okayama, 2013
  - Onychodactylus koreanus Min, Poyarkov, and Vieites, 2012
  - Onychodactylus nipponoborealis Kuro-o, Poyarkov, and Vieites, 2012
  - Onychodactylus tsukubaensis Yoshikawa and Matsui, 2013
  - Onychodactylus zhangyapingi Che, Poyarkov, and Yan, 2012
  - Onychodactylus zhaoermii Che, Poyarkov, and Yan, 2012
  - Onychodactylus sillanus Min, Borzée, and Poyarkov, 2022
  - Onychodactylus pyrrhonotus Yoshikawa et Matsui, 2022
