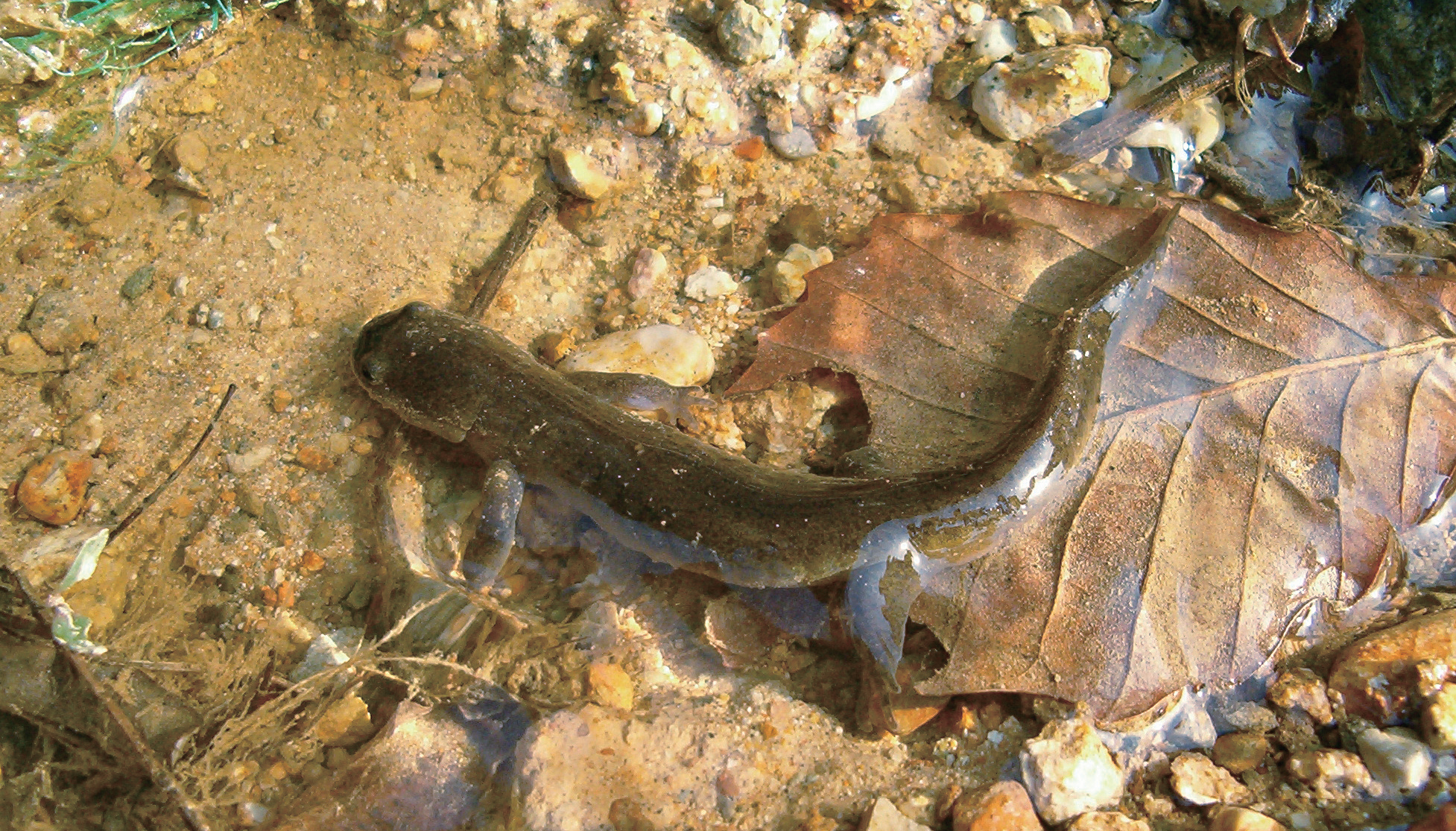

Conservation status
- Endangered (IUCN 3.1)

Scientific classification
- Kingdom: Animalia
- Phylum: Chordata
- Class: Amphibia
- Order: Urodela
- Family: Hynobiidae
- Genus: Hynobius
- Species: H. yangi

Binomial name
- Hynobius yangi Kim, Min & Matsui, 2003

= Hynobius yangi =

Species of amphibian

Hynobius yangi, the Kori salamander, is a species of salamander endemic to southeastern South Korea. It is a lentic-breeding species similar to the Korean salamander (H. leechi) but is distinguished by factors including tail shape and dorsal coloration. The species is known from the vicinity of the type locality in Gijang County in northeastern Busan and from the nearby Ulju County in western Ulsan.

== Etymology ==
The Kori salamander takes its common name from its type locality, Kori in Jangan-eup, Gijang County, in rural northern Busan. Its scientific name honours Suh-Yung Yang, a Korean herpetologist.

== Description ==
Hynobius yangi males measure 42–63 mm (1.7–2.5 in) (n=18 individuals) and females 57–61 mm (2.2–2.4 in) in snout–vent length (n=3). Tail length is about 70–90% of snout–vent length. Males have relatively longer and higher tails than females. Dorsum is olive without dark speckles, or in some individuals, dark brownish dotted very finely with yellow speckles. The underside is lighter.

Breeding occurs from late February to late March. Egg sacs are coil-shaped. Clutch size in one female was 86 eggs of about 2.8 mm (0.11 in) in diameter.

== Habitat and conservation ==
Hynobius yangi inhabits hilly forest areas. Breeding takes place in still water in ditches. Egg sacs are attached to water plants or fallen branches.

IUCN has assessed Hynobius yangi as "Endangered" because of its small distribution area and continuing habitat loss.

== See also ==
- List of amphibians of Korea
- Korean crevice salamander
