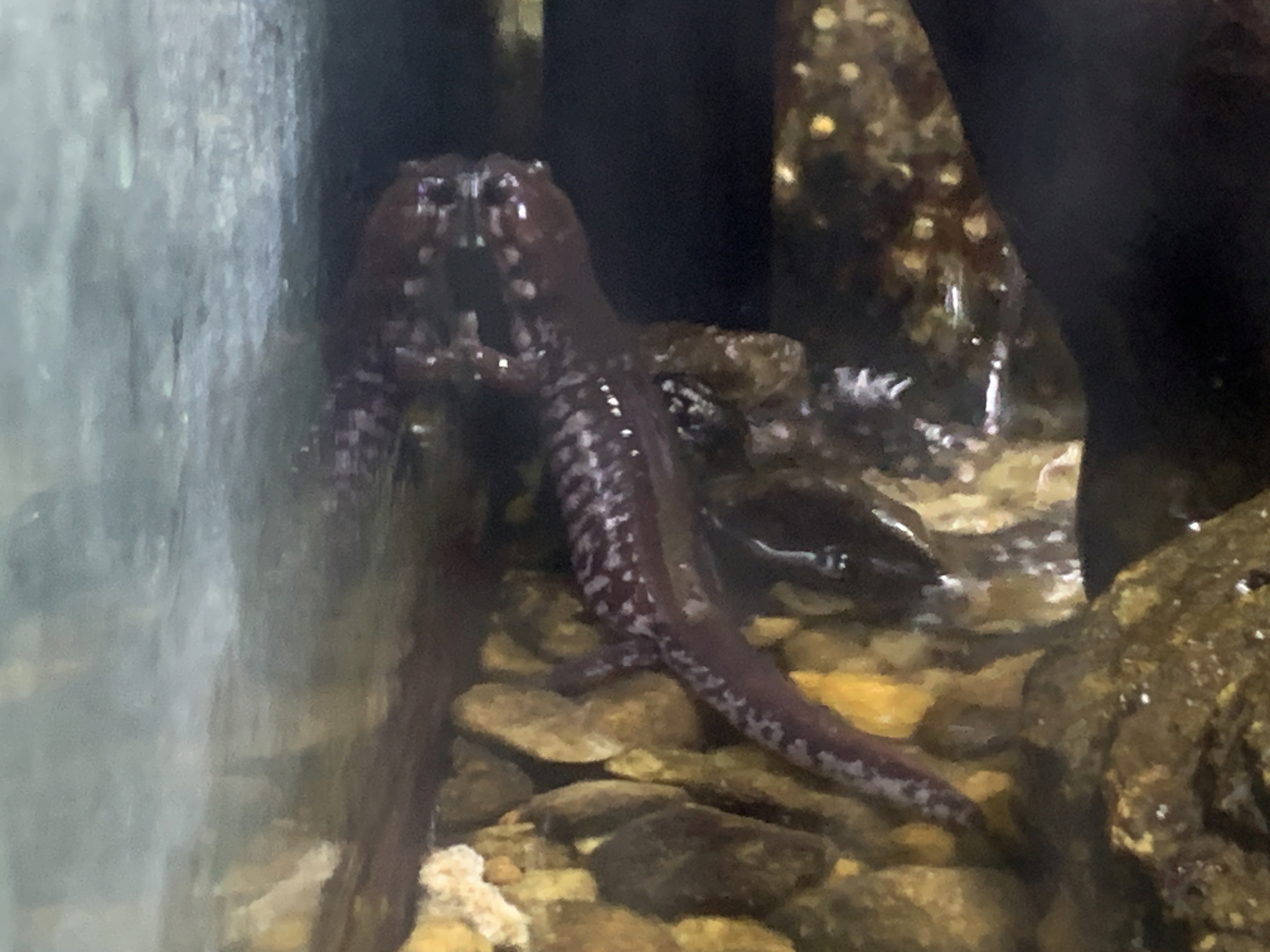

Conservation status
- Endangered (IUCN 3.1)

Scientific classification
- Kingdom: Animalia
- Phylum: Chordata
- Class: Amphibia
- Order: Urodela
- Family: Hynobiidae
- Genus: Hynobius
- Species: H. naevius

Binomial name
- Hynobius naevius (Temminck and Schlegel, 1838)

Synonyms
- Salamandra naevia Temminck and Schlegel, 1838; Molge naevia (Temminck and Schlegel, 1838); Ellipsoglossa naevia (Temminck and Schlegel, 1838)

= Hynobius naevius =

Species of amphibian

Hynobius naevius, also known as the spotted salamander, Sagami salamander, Japanese salamander, and blotched salamander, is a species of salamander in the family Hynobiidae. It is endemic to northwestern Kyushu, Japan. Earlier records from Honshu represent other species.

Hynobius naevius, as understood broadly, occurs in broad-leaved evergreen forests and mixed forests at elevations between 300 and 1,000 m (980 and 3,280 ft) above sea level. Breeding takes place in streams where also the larvae develop. Hynobius naevius is common within its range and is not facing known significant threats. It probably can be found in several protected areas.
