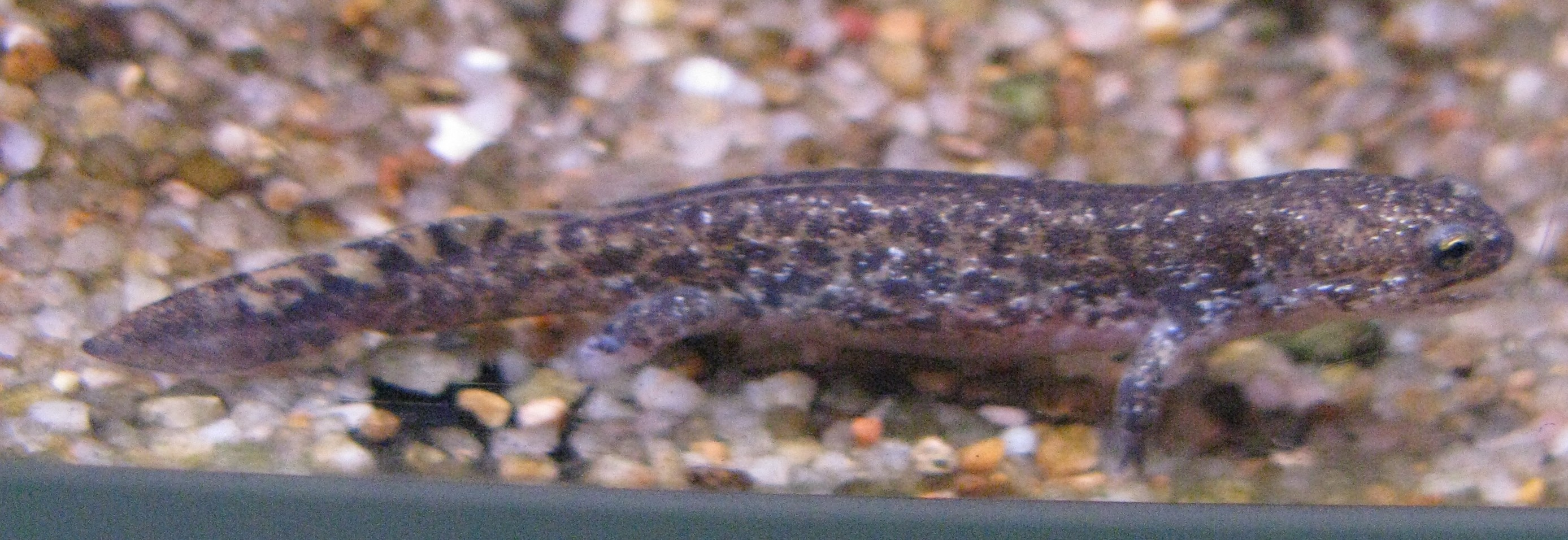

Conservation status
- Least Concern (IUCN 3.1)

Scientific classification
- Kingdom: Animalia
- Phylum: Chordata
- Class: Amphibia
- Order: Urodela
- Family: Hynobiidae
- Genus: Hynobius
- Species: H. nebulosus

Binomial name
- Hynobius nebulosus (Temminck & Schlegel, 1838)

= Hynobius nebulosus =

Species of amphibian

Hynobius nebulosus, the Mitsyama salamander, is a species of salamander in the family Hynobiidae endemic to Japan. Its natural habitats are temperate forests, rivers, swamps, freshwater springs, and irrigated land. It is threatened by habitat loss.
