= Tsushima salamander =

Conservation status
- Near Threatened (IUCN 3.1)

Scientific classification
- Kingdom: Animalia
- Phylum: Chordata
- Class: Amphibia
- Order: Urodela
- Family: Hynobiidae
- Genus: Hynobius
- Species: H. tsuensi

Binomial name
- Hynobius tsuensi Abé, 1922

Species of amphibian

The Tsushima salamander (Hynobius tsuensis) is a species of salamander in the family Hynobiidae, endemic to Japan. Its natural habitats are temperate forests and rivers.
