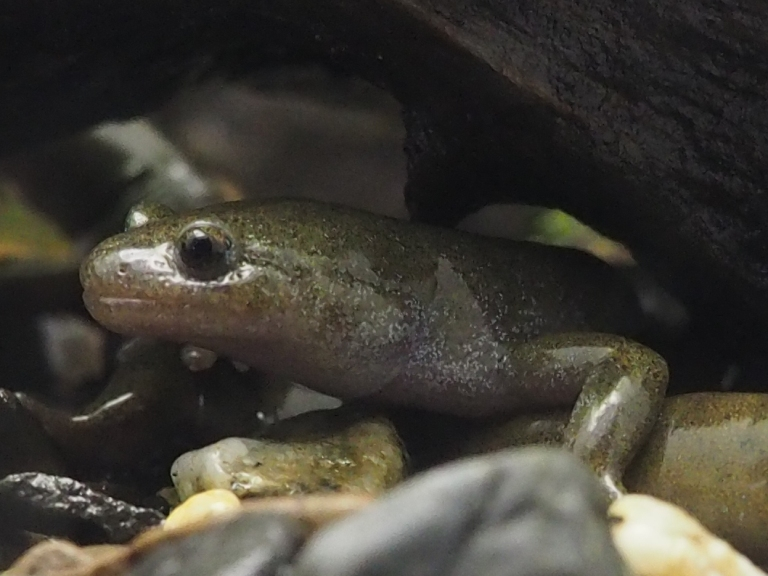

Conservation status
- Vulnerable (IUCN 3.1)

Scientific classification
- Kingdom: Animalia
- Phylum: Chordata
- Class: Amphibia
- Order: Urodela
- Family: Hynobiidae
- Genus: Hynobius
- Species: H. dunni

Binomial name
- Hynobius dunni Tago, 1931

= Oita salamander =

Species of amphibian

The Oita salamander (Hynobius dunni) is a species of salamander in the family Hynobiidae endemic to Japan. Named after Ōita Prefecture, its natural habitats are temperate forests, rivers, intermittent rivers, freshwater marshes, intermittent freshwater marshes, and irrigated land in western Japan. It is threatened by habitat loss, due to the increasing construction of homes within its habitat. The Oita salamander is considered to be vulnerable by the (IUCN) Red List of Threatened Species with a declining population.

Across Japan, the Oita salamander genetically differs based on their location. The DNA diversity was most apparent when comparing both the Northern and Southern species across Japan.

== Description ==
The Oita salamander tends to be greenish-grey in color, some even being brown. On their dorsal, they typically have black dots with a lot of the salamanders lacking dots. Those with dots will fade as they enter adulthood. Unlike the dorsal surface, the ventricle surface tends to be a blueish-grey that becomes lighter at the salamander's throat. Young Oita salamanders have a blue iridescent highlight to them, until they eventually fade with adulthood. In wetter environments the blue iridescent color is more pronounced than those in dryer locations. This salamander unlike most animals have only 11 coastal grooves, compared to the normal 12. Those with 11 grooves are documented. Their (SVL) snout to vent length 6–8 cm with a maximum of 10–16 cm, their bodies tend to be around this range also.

== Habitat ==
Like prefaced before, its natural habitats are temperate forests, rivers, intermittent rivers, freshwater marshes, intermittent freshwater marshes, and irrigated land in western Japan. This species can be found exclusively in the Japanese Island groups of Shikoku and Kyushu. The live in secondary forests and bamboo woods. Outside of the mating season, they can be found under stones and leaves.

== Feeding ==
The Oita salamander enjoys eating insects, i.e., earthworms, miniature mealworms, fly maggots, spiders, mosquito larvae, woodlice, millipedes, etc. However, this salamander does not eat slugs, compared to the other types of salamanders. They eat quite a lot during the winter, and don't use much energy. They end up looking chubbier.

== Breeding ==
There is no distinct appearance separating male and female Oita salamanders except for during the mating season (December – May). Male Oita salamanders heads grow much broader, their throats become lighter in color, and their tail fin grows taller. The female salamanders tails become yellow, and their weight increases due to ovulation and their egg sacs absorbing water. Very little happens to their appearance in the mating season. During this period males will be the first to enter the water, a trend shown with many salamanders, they will stay in the water until either April or May (this is called the aquatic phase). The preferable breeding habitat is strewn about with twigs and branches. The salamanders tend to be more attracted to thicker branches since it can hold more of them. Males will go out and find grounds for breeding, females who approach those breeding grounds are followed by males. When the females start to swim, males will bite and poke at each other. The females need to deliver their eggs and will gesture when they need to deliver them. A notable gesture could be restlessness, which will make males go closer to her. In every egg sac, there is 80 to 140 eggs (in slow moving water). Females lay in pairs, when the egg pair is delivered a male typically the first male to engage the female will get onto the sac, and to compete, more males will hope onto the sac, trying to fertilize it, inevitably creating a mating ball. This behavior is usually called the scramble competition.

The breeding can be broken down into 4 phases.

=== Male breeding phases ===
==== Phase 1 ====
The "wandering phase", the males walk at the bottom of the river/pond/tank (if in captivity) searching for branches that can hold the weight of at least several Oita salamanders.

==== Phase 2 ====
The "climbing phase", after they have found an adequate branch, the males board (climb) them. Sometimes, the salamander—while grasping the twig—will stiffen their body which is associated with sexual excitement. This can be seen even after the salamander has deposited their sperm.

==== Phase 3 ====
The "attraction/attention phase", tail fanning/swinging begins and their throats enlarge. This phase attracts females, which in turn attracts males. Tail swinging isn't found in any other species besides the Oita salamanders.

==== Phase 4 ====
The "marking phase", the male marks their territory but rubbing their cloaca in the area they are tail fanning.

== Sources ==
- Kaneko, Y.; Matsui, M. (2004). "Hynobius dunni". IUCN Red List of Threatened Species. 2004 e.T10614A3205218. doi:10.2305/IUCN.UK.2004.RLTS.T10614A3205218.en.
- Sugawara, Hirotaka; Nagano, Masahiro; Sueyoshi, Toyofumi; Hayashi, Fumio (February 2015). "Local Genetic Differentiation and Diversity of the Oita Salamander (Hynobius dunni) in Kyushu Revealed by Mitochondrial and Microsatellite DNA Analyses". Current Herpetology. 34 (1): 1–11. doi:10.5358/hsj.34.1. S2CID 86415754.
