= Xingan salamander =

Conservation status
- Critically Endangered (IUCN 3.1)

Scientific classification
- Kingdom: Animalia
- Phylum: Chordata
- Class: Amphibia
- Order: Urodela
- Family: Hynobiidae
- Genus: Hynobius
- Species: H. maoershanensis

Binomial name
- Hynobius maoershanensis Zhou, Jiang & Jiang, 2006

Species of amphibian

The Xingan salamander (Hynobius maoershanensis) is a species of salamander in the family Hynobiidae, endemic to China: it is only known from its type locality, Mao'ershan (Mount Mao'er) in the Xing'an County, Guangxi. Its natural habitats are marshes and the surrounding forests. It is threatened by habitat loss and, living close to the summit of Mao'ershan at around 2,000 m (6,600 ft) asl, by climate change. It occurs within the Mao'ershan National Nature Reserve.
