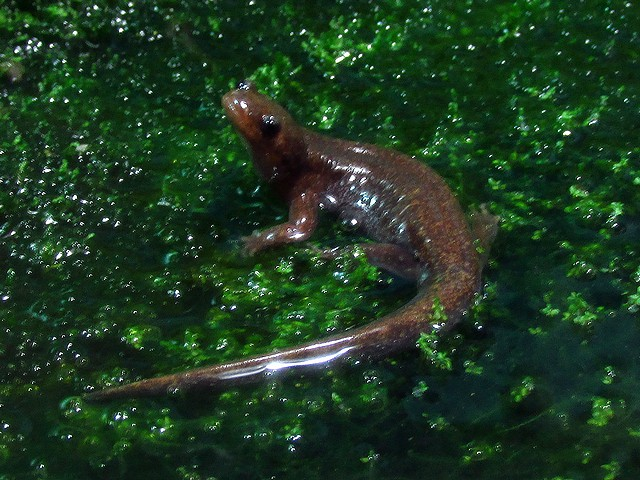

Conservation status
- Least Concern (IUCN 3.1)

Scientific classification
- Kingdom: Animalia
- Phylum: Chordata
- Class: Amphibia
- Order: Urodela
- Family: Hynobiidae
- Genus: Hynobius
- Species: H. lichenatus

Binomial name
- Hynobius lichenatus Boulenger, 1883

= Tōhoku salamander =

Tohoku salamander

Species of amphibian

The Tohoku salamander (Hynobius lichenatus) is a species of salamander in the family Hynobiidae, endemic to Japan. Its natural habitats are temperate forests and rivers.
