= Hynobius katoi =

Conservation status
- Endangered (IUCN 3.1)

Scientific classification
- Kingdom: Animalia
- Phylum: Chordata
- Class: Amphibia
- Order: Urodela
- Family: Hynobiidae
- Genus: Hynobius
- Species: H. katoi

Binomial name
- Hynobius katoi Matsui, Kokuryo, Misawa & Nishikawa, 2004

Species of amphibian

Hynobius katoi is a species of salamander in the family Hynobiidae, endemic to Japan. Its natural habitats are temperate forests and rivers.
