= Hynobius glacialis =

Conservation status
- Critically Endangered (IUCN 3.1)

Scientific classification
- Kingdom: Animalia
- Phylum: Chordata
- Class: Amphibia
- Order: Urodela
- Family: Hynobiidae
- Genus: Hynobius
- Species: H. glacialis

Binomial name
- Hynobius glacialis Lai & Lue, 2008

Species of amphibian

Hynobius glacialis, the Nanhu salamander, is a species of salamander in the family Hynobiidae, endemic to Taiwan. Its common name refers to the type locality, Nanhu Mountain. The mountain contains glacial relic formations, the reason for the species epithet glacialis.

Nanhu salamanders are known from the northern Central Mountain Range and the Syueshan Mountain Range from above 3,000 m (9,800 ft). They are parapatric with H. formosanus that occurs at lower altitudes. They live near alpine tundra, usually beside creeks, cold springs, and seepages, usually hiding during the day. Their reproductive biology remains unknown.

The Nanhu salamander is medium-sized; adults are about 4.8–6.7 cm (1.9–2.6 in) in snout–vent length; it is the largest Taiwanese hynobiid.
