= Oki salamander =

Conservation status
- Endangered (IUCN 3.1)

Scientific classification
- Kingdom: Animalia
- Phylum: Chordata
- Class: Amphibia
- Order: Urodela
- Family: Hynobiidae
- Genus: Hynobius
- Species: H. okiensis

Binomial name
- Hynobius okiensis Sato, 1940

Species of amphibian

The Oki salamander (Hynobius okiensis) is a species of salamander in the family Hynobiidae, endemic to Japan. Its natural habitats are temperate forests, rivers, and plantations. It is threatened by habitat loss.
