= Hokuriku salamander =

Conservation status
- Endangered (IUCN 3.1)

Scientific classification
- Kingdom: Animalia
- Phylum: Chordata
- Class: Amphibia
- Order: Urodela
- Family: Hynobiidae
- Genus: Hynobius
- Species: H. takedai

Binomial name
- Hynobius takedai Matsui & Miyazaki, 1984

Species of amphibian

The Hokuriku salamander (Hynobius takedai) is a species of salamander in the family Hynobiidae, endemic to Japan. Its natural habitats are temperate forests, rivers, freshwater marshes, freshwater springs, and irrigated land. It is threatened by habitat loss.
