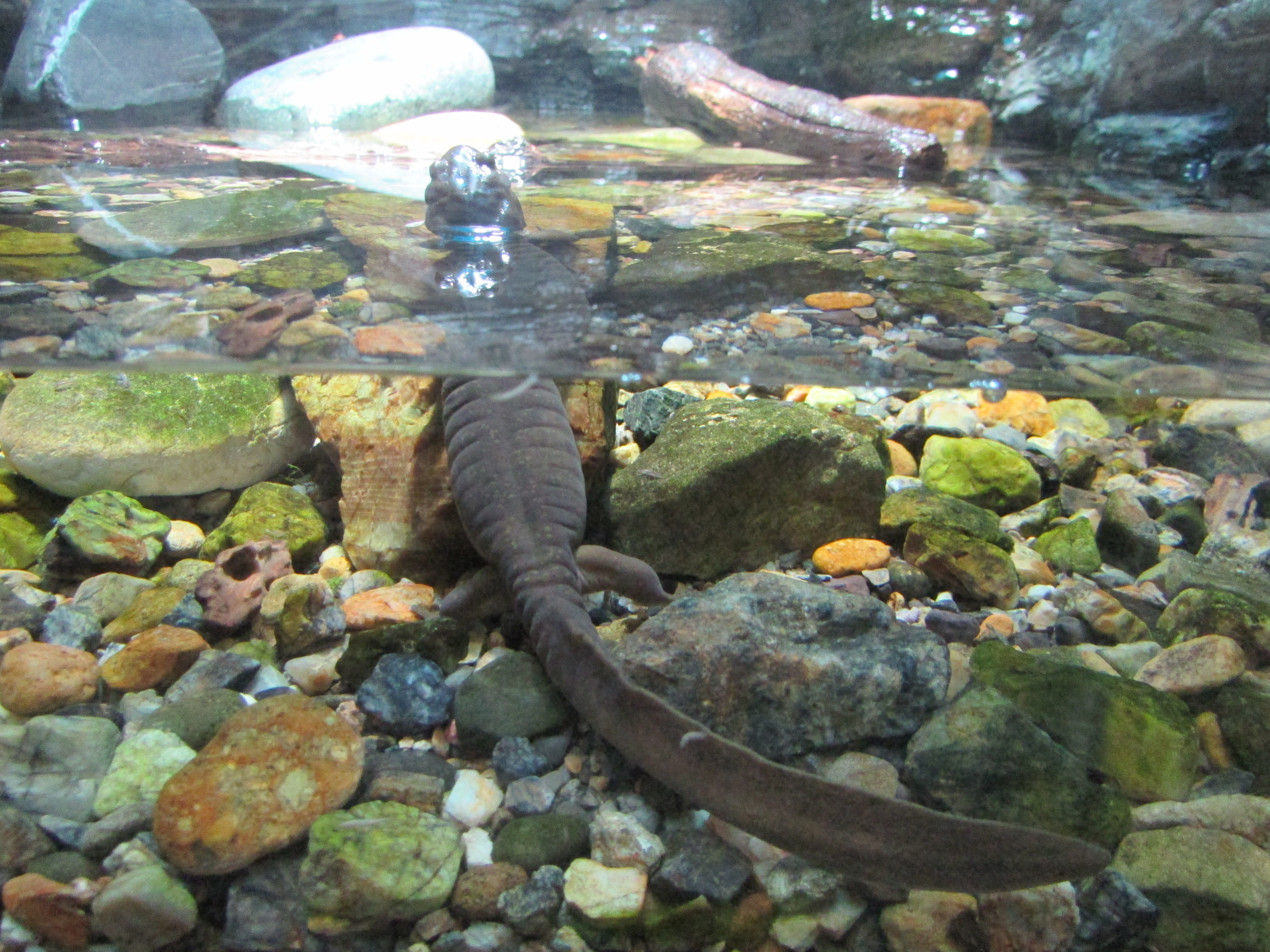

Conservation status
- Least Concern (IUCN 3.1)

Scientific classification
- Kingdom: Animalia
- Phylum: Chordata
- Class: Amphibia
- Order: Urodela
- Family: Hynobiidae
- Genus: Hynobius
- Species: H. nigrescens

Binomial name
- Hynobius nigrescens Stejneger, 1907

= Japanese black salamander =

Species of amphibian

The Japanese black salamander (Hynobius nigrescens) is a species of salamander in the family Hynobiidae, endemic to Japan.

Its natural habitats are temperate forests, temperate grassland, swamps, freshwater marshes, intermittent freshwater marshes, irrigated land, canals and ditches.

When the larva goes through metamorphosis its gills and fins are replaced with lungs and legs. As the salamander grows, many of its muscles are shifted or are created in order to account for its size and weight.
