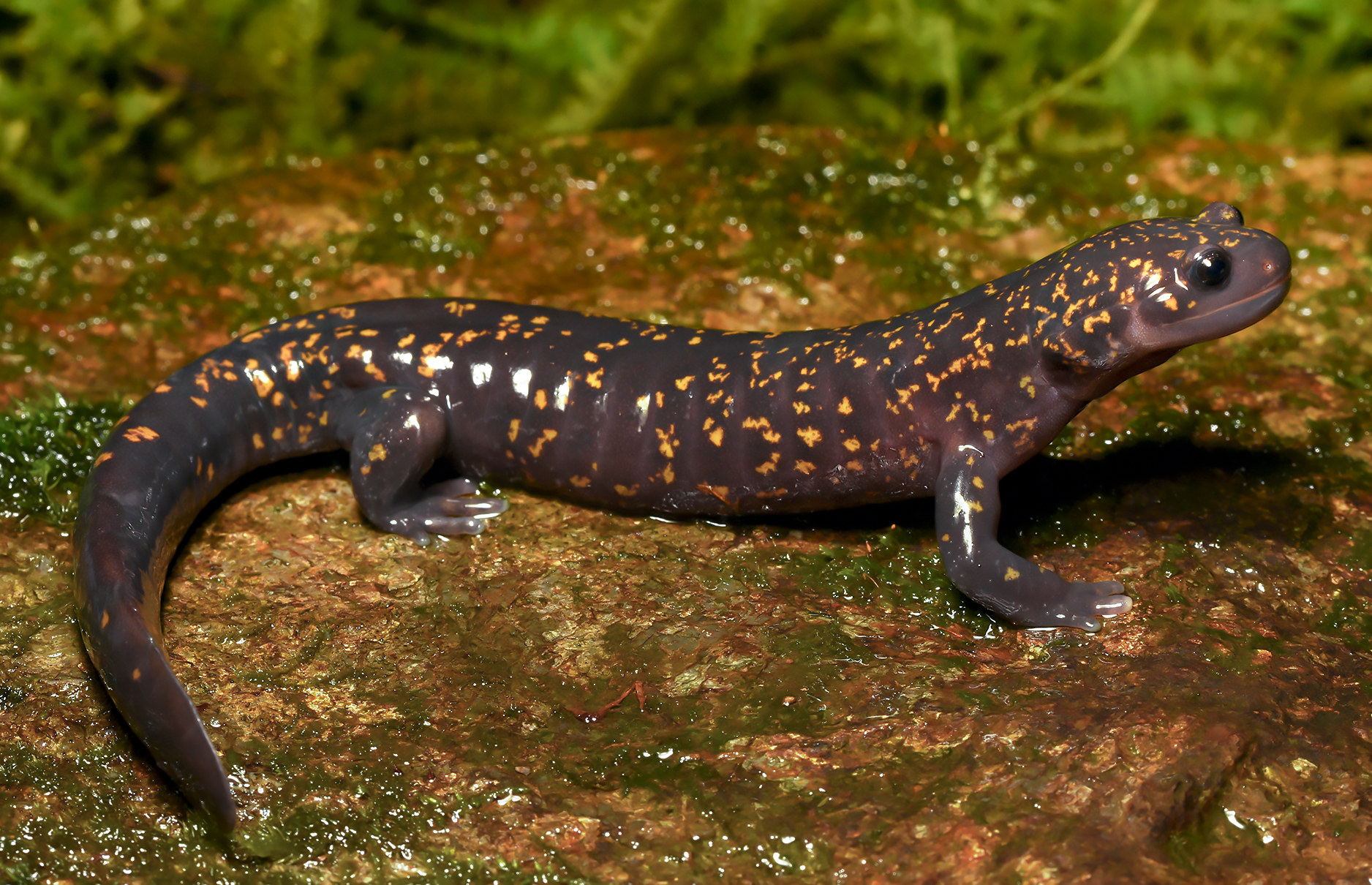
- Hynobius fossigenus

Scientific classification
- Kingdom: Animalia
- Phylum: Chordata
- Class: Amphibia
- Order: Urodela
- Suborder: Cryptobranchoidea
- Family: Hynobiidae
- Subfamily: Hynobiinae
- Genus: Hynobius; Tschudi, 1838

Type species
- Hynobius nebulosus Temminck & Schlegel, 1838

= Hynobius =

Genus of salamanders

Hynobius is a genus of salamander (Asian salamanders) in the family Hynobiidae, occurring in Japan, Korea, China, Taiwan and Far East Russia. It is a large genus containing over 40 species. The Japanese archipelago is the primary diversity hotspot for the genus, with nearly 67.3% of Hynobius species being endemic to it.

== Species ==
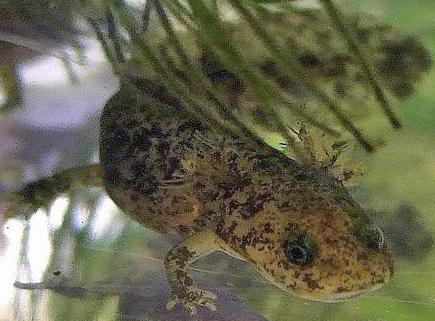
A larval Hynobius kimurae

Species included (as of June 2025):

- Hynobius abei Sato, 1934
- Hynobius abuensis Matsui, Okawa, Nishikawa, and Tominaga, 2019
- Hynobius akiensis Matsui, Okawa, and Nishikawa, 2019
- Hynobius amabensis Sugawara and Nagano, 2023
- Hynobius amakusaensis Nishikawa and Matsui, 2014
- Hynobius amjiensis Gu, 1992
- Hynobius arisanensis Maki, 1922
- Hynobius bakan Matsui, Okawa, and Nishikawa, 2019
- Hynobius bambusicolus Wang, Othman, Qiu and Borzée, 2023
- Hynobius boulengeri (Thompson, 1912)
- Hynobius chinensis Günther, 1889
- Hynobius dunni Tago, 1931
- Hynobius formosanus Maki, 1922
- Hynobius fossigenus Okamiya, Sugawara, Nagano, and Poyarkov, 2018
- Hynobius fucus Lai and Lue, 2008
- Hynobius geiyoensis Sugawara, Naito, Iwata, and Nagano, 2022
- Hynobius geojeensis Min and Borzée, 2021
- Hynobius glacialis Lai and Lue, 2008
- Hynobius guabangshanensis Shen, 2004
- Hynobius guttatus Tominaga, Matsui, Tanabe, and Nishikawa, 2019
- Hynobius hidamontanus Matsui, 1987
- Hynobius hirosei Lantz, 1931
- Hynobius ikioi Matsui, Nishikawa, and Tominaga, 2017
- Hynobius iwami Matsui, Okawa, Nishikawa, and Tominaga, 2019
- Hynobius katoi Matsui, Kokuryo, Misawa, and Nishikawa, 2004
- Hynobius kimurae Dunn, 1923
- Hynobius kuishiensis Tominaga, Matsui, Tanabe, and Nishikawa, 2019
- Hynobius kunibiki Sugawara, Iwata, Yamashita, and Nagano, 2021
- Hynobius leechii Boulenger, 1887
- Hynobius lichenatus Boulenger, 1883
- Hynobius maoershanensis Zhou, Jiang, and Jiang, 2006
- Hynobius mikawaensis Matsui, Misawa, Nishikawa, and Shimada, 2017
- Hynobius miyazakiensis Sugawara, Nagano, and Sueyoshi, 2023
- Hynobius naevius (Temminck and Schlegel, 1838)
- Hynobius nagatoensis Sugawara, Tahara, Matsukoji, and Nagano, 2022
- Hynobius nebulosus (Temminck and Schlegel, 1838)
- Hynobius nigrescens Stejneger, 1907
- Hynobius nihoensis Sugawara, Nagano, and Nakazono, 2022
- Hynobius notialis Min and Borzée, 2021
- Hynobius okiensis Sato, 1940
- Hynobius oni Kanamori, Nishikawa, Matsui, and Tanabe, 2022
- Hynobius osumiensis Nishikawa and Matsui, 2014
- Hynobius oyamai Tominaga, Matsui, and Nishikawa, 2019
- Hynobius owariensis Sugawara, Fujitani, Seguchi, Sawahata, and Nagano, 2022
- Hynobius perplicatus Min and Borzée, 2021
- Hynobius quelpaertensis Mori, 1928
- Hynobius retardatus Dunn, 1923
- Hynobius sematonotos Tominaga, Matsui, and Nishikawa, 2019
- Hynobius sengokui Matsui, Misawa, Yoshikawa, and Nishikawa, 2022
- Hynobius setoi Matsui, Tanabe, and Misawa, 2019
- Hynobius setouchi Matsui, Okawa, Tanabe, and Misawa, 2019
- Hynobius shinichisatoi Nishikawa and Matsui, 2014
- Hynobius sonani (Maki, 1922)
- Hynobius stejnegeri Dunn, 1923
- Hynobius sumidai Sugawara, Naito, Iwata, and Nagano, 2022
- Hynobius takedai Matsui and Miyazaki, 1984
- Hynobius tokyoensis Tago, 1931
- Hynobius tosashimizuensis Sugawara, Watabe, Yoshikawa, and Nagano, 2018
- Hynobius tsuensis Abé, 1922
- Hynobius tsurugiensis Tominaga, Matsui, Tanabe, and Nishikawa, 2019
- Hynobius turkestanicus Nikolskii, 1910
- Hynobius unisacculus Min, Baek, Song, Chang, and Poyarkov, 2016
- Hynobius utsunomiyaorum Matsui and Okawa, 2019
- Hynobius vandenburghi Dunn, 1923
- Hynobius yangi Kim, Min, and Matsui, 2003
- Hynobius yiwuensis Cai, 1985

== Internal Phylogeny ==
- - Hynobius retardatus
  - - - - Hynobius boulengeri
        - Hynobius kimurae
      - - Hynobius fuca
        - - Hynobius glacialis
          - - Hynobius formosanus
            - - Hynobius arisanensis
              - Hynobius sonani
    - - - Hynobius naevius
        - Hynobius amjiensis
      - - Hynobius katoi
        - - - Hynobius hidamontanus
            - - Hynobius yiwuensis
              - - Hynobius guabangshanensis
                - - Hynobius chinensis
                  - Hynobius maoershanensis
          - - - - Hynobius leechii
                - Hynobius yangi
              - - Hynobius quelpaertensis
                - - Hynobius dunni
                  - - Hynobius okiensis
                    - Hynobius tsuensis
            - - Hynobius nebulosus
              - - Hynobius stejnegeri
                - - Hynobius lichenatus
                  - - - Hynobius abei
                      - Hynobius tokyoensis
                    - - Hynobius nigrescens
                      - Hynobius takedai

Internal phylogeny tree of genus Hynobius.
