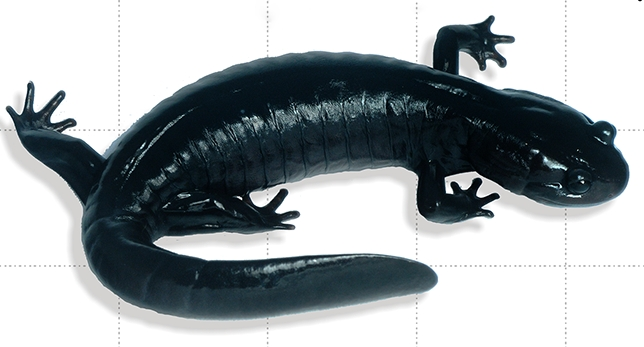

Conservation status
- Endangered (IUCN 3.1)

Scientific classification
- Kingdom: Animalia
- Phylum: Chordata
- Class: Amphibia
- Order: Urodela
- Family: Hynobiidae
- Genus: Hynobius
- Species: H. boulengeri

Binomial name
- Hynobius boulengeri (Thompson, 1912)

= Odaigahara salamander =

Species of amphibian

The Odaigahara salamander (Hynobius boulengeri) is a species of salamander in the family Hynobiidae. It is endemic to Japan. Its natural habitats are temperate forests, rivers, and freshwater springs. This species is threatened by habitat loss.
