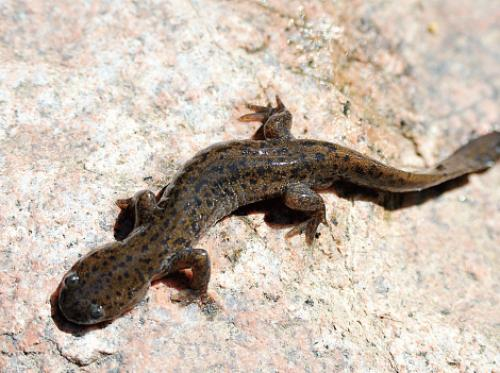
- In Danyang

Conservation status
- Least Concern (IUCN 3.1)

Scientific classification
- Kingdom: Animalia
- Phylum: Chordata
- Class: Amphibia
- Order: Urodela
- Family: Hynobiidae
- Genus: Hynobius
- Species: H. leechii

Binomial name
- Hynobius leechii Boulenger, 1887

Synonyms
- Hynobius mantchuricus Mori, 1927

= Korean salamander =

Species of amphibian

The Korean salamander (Hynobius leechii), also known as the Gensan salamander or the Northeastern China hynobiid salamander, is a species of salamander belonging to the family Hynobiidae, the Asiatic salamanders. This salamander is found in northeastern Asia in the Korean Peninsula and adjacent parts of China and, possibly, the Russian Far East.

== Taxonomy ==
The Korean salamander was first formally described in 1887 by the Belgian-born British ichthyologist and herpetologist George Albert Boulenger with its type locality given as Gensan, Korea. This salamander is classified in the genus Hynobius, which is the type genus of the subfamily Hyboniinae of the Asiatic salamander family Hynobiidae. This is one of a number closely related species of salamanders in this genus found in Korea which were previously regarded as a single species.

== Etymology ==
The Korean salamander has the specific name leechii, this is in honour of John Henry Leech, the English entomologist who collected the type specimen.

== Description ==
The Korean salamander is black in colour with pale brown mottling on its back. The adults show no sign of a fin on the tail. The juveniles have a wide cream line down the back, which is sometimes broken.

== Distribution and habitat ==
The Korean salamander is found in northeastern Asia in South Korea, North Korea and Liaoning, Jilin and Heilongjiang provinces in northeastern China. It may also occur in the Russian Far East but there are no records from there. This salamander is found in hill forests and spawns in stream pools, fallow rice paddies and nearby still-water pools, the larvae developing in the same habitats.

== See also ==
- List of amphibians of Korea
- Korean crevice salamander
- Kori salamander
- Jiyul - Buddhist nun who fasted to stop destruction of Korean salamander lands
- Some Reptiles and Amphibians from Korea by (1962) Robert G. Webb, J. Knox Jones, Jr., and George W. Byers in University of Kansas Publications Museum of Natural History, Vol. 15, No. 2, pp. 149–173, January 31, 1962.
