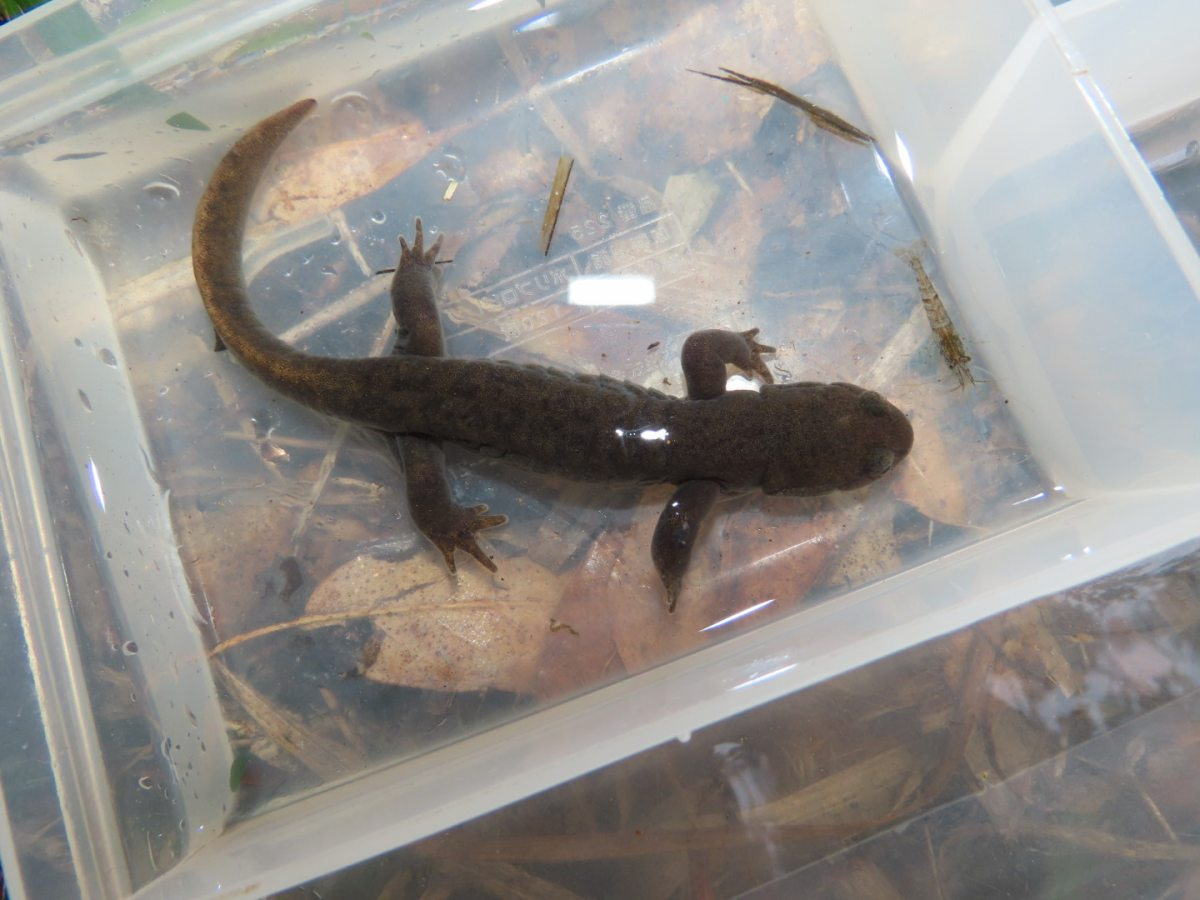

Conservation status
- Endangered (IUCN 3.1)

Scientific classification
- Kingdom: Animalia
- Phylum: Chordata
- Class: Amphibia
- Order: Urodela
- Family: Hynobiidae
- Genus: Hynobius
- Species: H. abuensis

Binomial name
- Hynobius abuensis Matsui, Okawa, Nishikawa & Tominaga, 2019

= Hynobius abuensis =

Abu salamander

Species of asiatic salamander

Hynobius abuensis, also known as the Abu salamander, is a species of salamander in the family Hynobiidae. It is found in the Shimane and Yamaguchi prefectures of the Chūgoku region in Honshu, Japan. The name "Abu" refers to the region of the Yamaguchi Prefecture in which the species is found.

== Description ==
It has an olive-colored posterior, and a lighter underbelly. The underbelly is dotted with silvery-white spots. Like all species in the genus Hynobius, Hynobius abuensis has vomerine teeth, long legs, clawless fingers, and a tail a little shorter than its head and body combined. It is usually around 10 to 12 centimeters from head to tail. It also has lungs, in contrast to its lungless cousins of the genus Onychodactylus.

== Habitat ==
Hynobius abuensis is found in temperate forests, near still water bodies such as puddles and marshes. It is mainly found in a small area in southern Japan.

== Breeding ==
Hynobius abuensis breeds in still water bodies. Breeding usually occurs from February to March. H. abuensis larvae normally metamorphosize within the year of their birth. However, the larvae sometimes overwinter, and go through metamorphosis the next spring.
