= Chinese salamander =

Conservation status
- Data Deficient (IUCN 3.1)

Scientific classification
- Kingdom: Animalia
- Phylum: Chordata
- Class: Amphibia
- Order: Urodela
- Family: Hynobiidae
- Genus: Hynobius
- Species: H. chinensis

Binomial name
- Hynobius chinensis Günther, 1889

Species of amphibian

The Chinese salamander (Hynobius chinensis) is a species of salamander in the family Hynobiidae endemic to China. Its natural habitats are subtropical or tropical moist lowland forests, rivers, freshwater marshes, freshwater springs, and arable land. It is threatened by habitat loss.

The Chinese salamander is a terrestrial animal and only lives in water during its breeding period.
