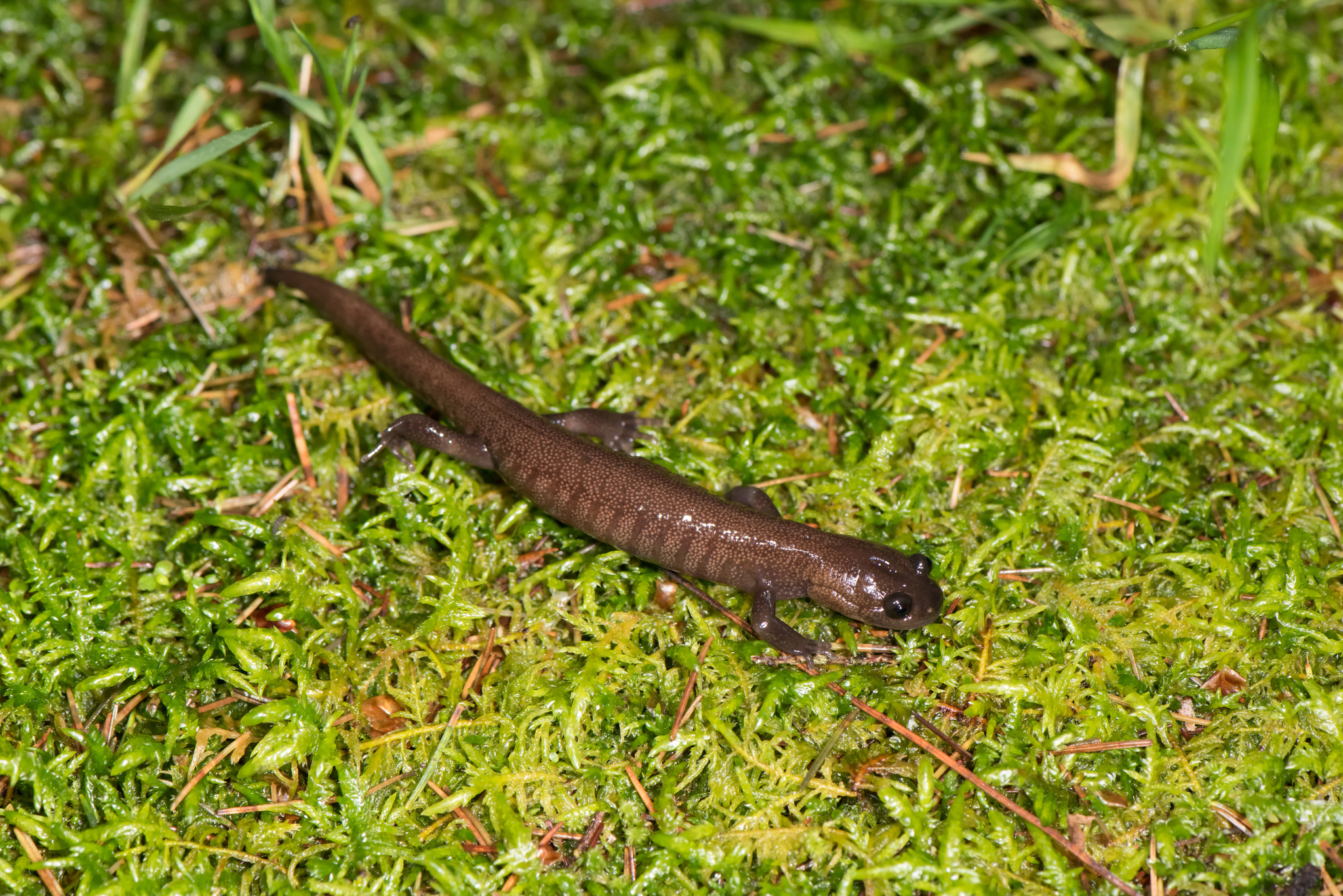

Conservation status
- Endangered (IUCN 3.1)

Scientific classification
- Kingdom: Animalia
- Phylum: Chordata
- Class: Amphibia
- Order: Urodela
- Family: Hynobiidae
- Genus: Hynobius
- Species: H. arisanensis

Binomial name
- Hynobius arisanensis Maki, 1922

= Hynobius arisanensis =

Species of amphibian

Hynobius arisanensis, the Alishan salamander, is a species of salamander in the family Hynobiidae endemic to Taiwan. It occurs in the Alishan Range, the Yushan Range, and southern Central Mountain Range, where it lives at altitudes of 1,800–3,600 m (5,900–11,800 ft) above sea level. Its natural habitats are temperate forests, rivers, and freshwater springs. It is usually hiding during day time.

Adult H. arisanensis measure 5.0–6.5 cm (2.0–2.6 in) in snout–vent length. It is blackish-brown to reddish-brown dorsally and somewhat lighter brown or grey-brown ventrally.

== Distribution and habitat ==
A study of H. arisanensis in the Alishan Range found the adults had home ranges of up to 500 m^{2} (mean 65 m^{2}). Adult and juvenile survival was high, 0.996 and 0.977, respectively. With the estimated population growth ratio of 1.077, the population appeared stable or slightly increasing. It is found in coniferous and broadleaf woodland near streams where it occurs at altitudes greater than 1,800 m (5,900 ft) and is considered rare. It probably breeds in the streams with the larvae developing in the water.

== Status ==
In its Red List of Threatened Species, the IUCN lists Hynobius arisanensis as being "endangered". This is because it is restricted to the Alishan, Yushan and Pei Ta Wu Shan mountain ranges in Taiwan where its range is fragmented. Its total area of occupancy is less than 2,000 square kilometres (770 sq mi) and its habitat is being degraded, particularly from the infrastructure development being undertaken in an attempt to increase tourism in the region. It is present in the Yushan National Park and the Tawushan Nature Preserve which should provide some measure of protection.
