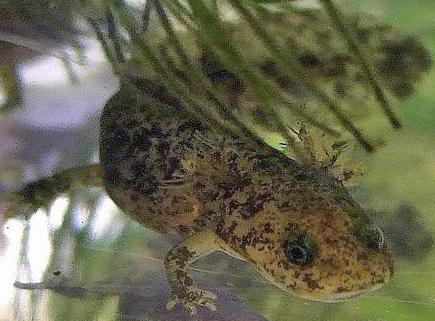

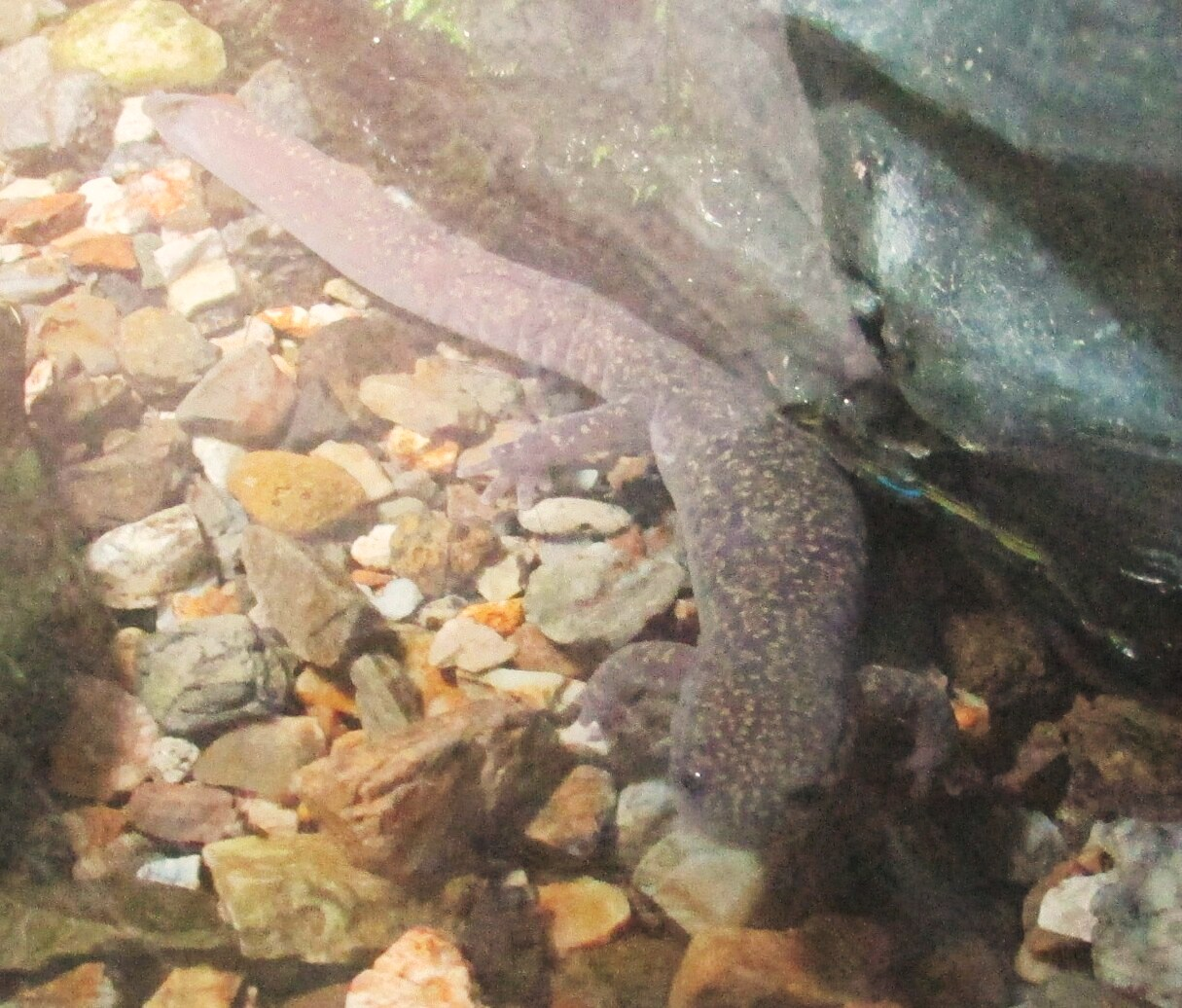

Conservation status
- Least Concern (IUCN 3.1)

Scientific classification
- Kingdom: Animalia
- Phylum: Chordata
- Class: Amphibia
- Order: Urodela
- Family: Hynobiidae
- Genus: Hynobius
- Species: H. kimurae

Binomial name
- Hynobius kimurae Dunn, 1923

Synonyms
- Hynobius luteopunctatus Hatta, 1914 — nomen nudum; Pseudosalamandra hida Tago, 1929 — nomen nudum

= Hida salamander =

Species of amphibian

The Hida salamander or Hondo salamander (Hynobius kimurae) is a species of salamander in the family Hynobiidae, the Asiatic salamanders. It is endemic to central and western Honshu, Japan. It lives in deciduous, coniferous, and mixed forests, where it breeds in streams. The egg sacs of this species were reported to display blue-to-yellow iridescent glow due to a quasi-periodic diffraction grating structure embedded within the enveloppes of the egg sacs. These salamanders typically spawn from February to April, leading some to metamorphose in late September while others wait for the following year to do so after winter is over.
