= Amji's salamander =

Conservation status
- Endangered (IUCN 3.1)

Scientific classification
- Kingdom: Animalia
- Phylum: Chordata
- Class: Amphibia
- Order: Urodela
- Family: Hynobiidae
- Genus: Hynobius
- Species: H. amjiensis

Binomial name
- Hynobius amjiensis Gu, 1992

Species of amphibian

Amji's salamander (Hynobius amjiensis) is a species of salamander in the family Hynobiidae. This species is endemic to China, or more specifically to Zhejiang Province; its breeding habitat consists of five small pools at the top of Mount Longwangshan, in Anji County, north-western Zhejiang, at about 1,300 m (4,300 ft) above sea level. Adult males have a total length of 153–166 mm (6.0–6.5 in) and females of about 166 mm (6.5 in).

Although the known breeding habitat is all contained within the small Longwangshan Nature Reserve, habitat alteration is increasingly becoming a problem due to the growing threat of human disturbance at the site, especially from tourist activities. This, in combination with the very small breeding population size, has made IUCN consider H. amjiensis as Endangered.
