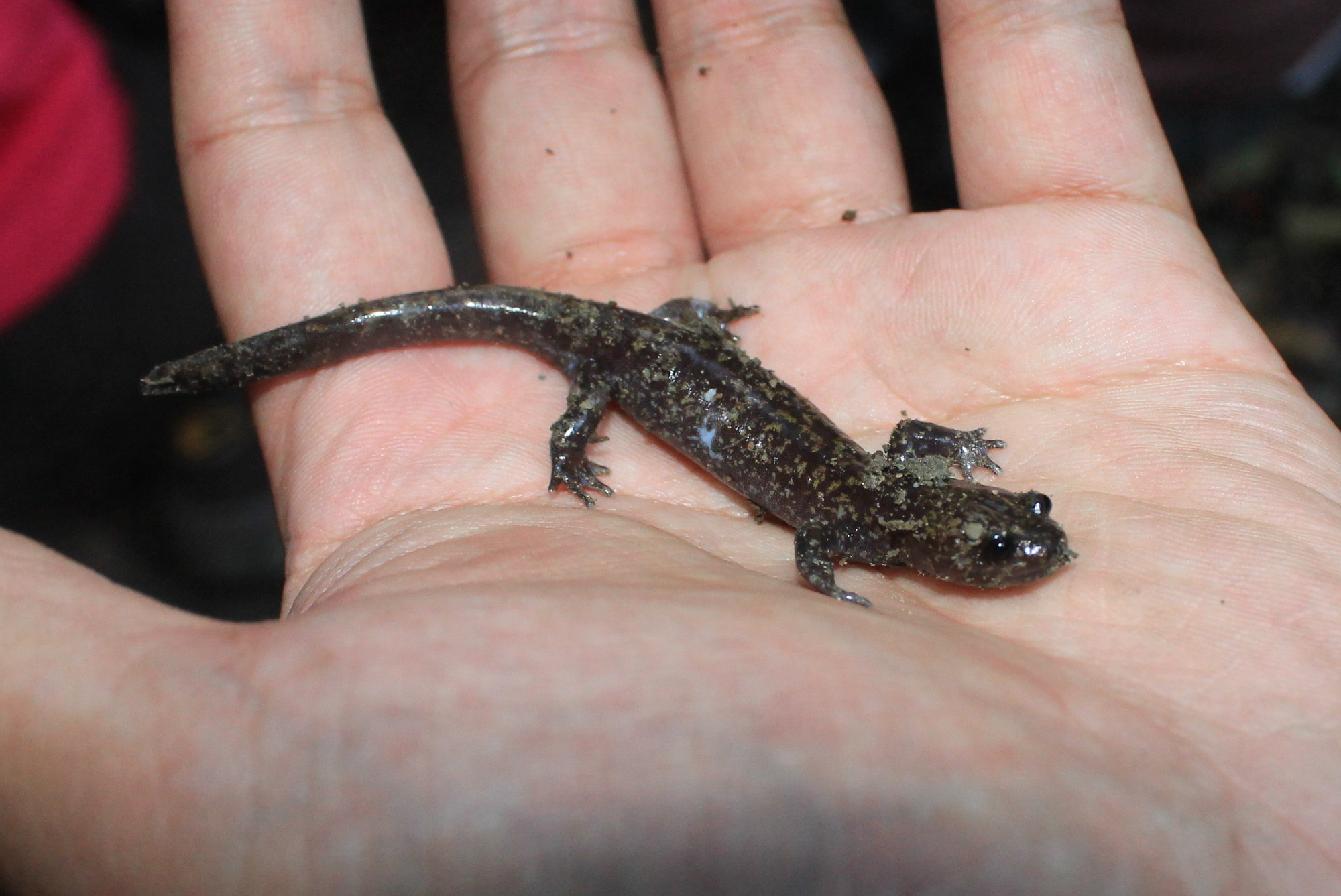
- H. formosanus in Taiwan

Conservation status
- Endangered (IUCN 3.1)

Scientific classification
- Kingdom: Animalia
- Phylum: Chordata
- Class: Amphibia
- Order: Urodela
- Family: Hynobiidae
- Genus: Hynobius
- Species: H. formosanus

Binomial name
- Hynobius formosanus Maki, 1922

= Hynobius formosanus =

Species of salamander

Hynobius formosanus, the Taiwan salamander, is a species of salamander in the family Hynobiidae, endemic to Taiwan, where it occurs in the high mountains at around 2,100 m (6,900 ft). Its natural habitats are from open alpine habitats to shaded moist evergreen forests. Adults have a total length of 58–98 mm (2.3–3.9 in).

== See also ==
- List of protected species in Taiwan
- List of endemic species of Taiwan
