= List of amphibians of Taiwan =

At least 37 species of amphibians are native to Taiwan. Of these, 17 species are endemic to Taiwan. Salamander Echinotriton andersoni is considered extinct in Taiwan (but survives on the Ryukyu Islands of Japan). In addition, there are three introduced species: cane toad Rhinella marina, bullfrog Lithobates catesbeianus, and Chinese giant salamander Andrias davidianus. Thus, in total 40 amphibians have been recorded in Taiwan.

== Anura (frogs and toads) ==
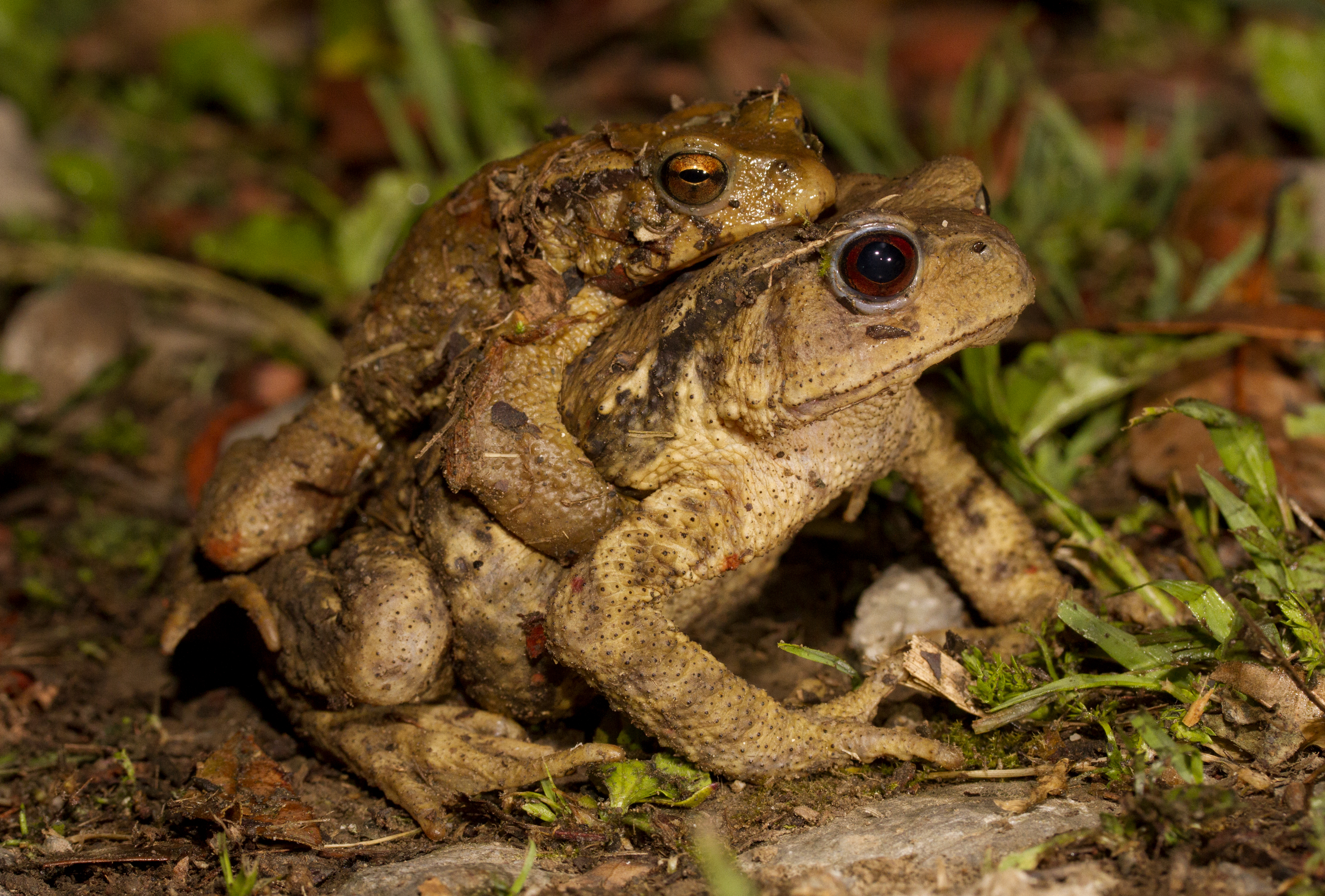
Bufo bankorensis, an endemic toad

Family Bufonidae — true toads

- Bufo bankorensis (Barbour, 1908) — endemic
- Duttaphrynus melanostictus (Schneider, 1799)
- Rhinella marina (Linnaeus, 1758) — introduced

Family Dicroglossidae — fork-tongued frogs

- Fejervarya cancrivora (Gravenhorst, 1829)
- Fejervarya limnocharis (Gravenhorst, 1829)
- Hoplobatrachus rugulosus (Wiegmann, 1834)
- Limnonectes fujianensis (Ye and Fei, 1994)

Family Hylidae — (Ameroaustralian) treefrogs

- Hyla chinensis (Günther, 1858)

Family Microhylidae — narrow-mouthed frogs/toads

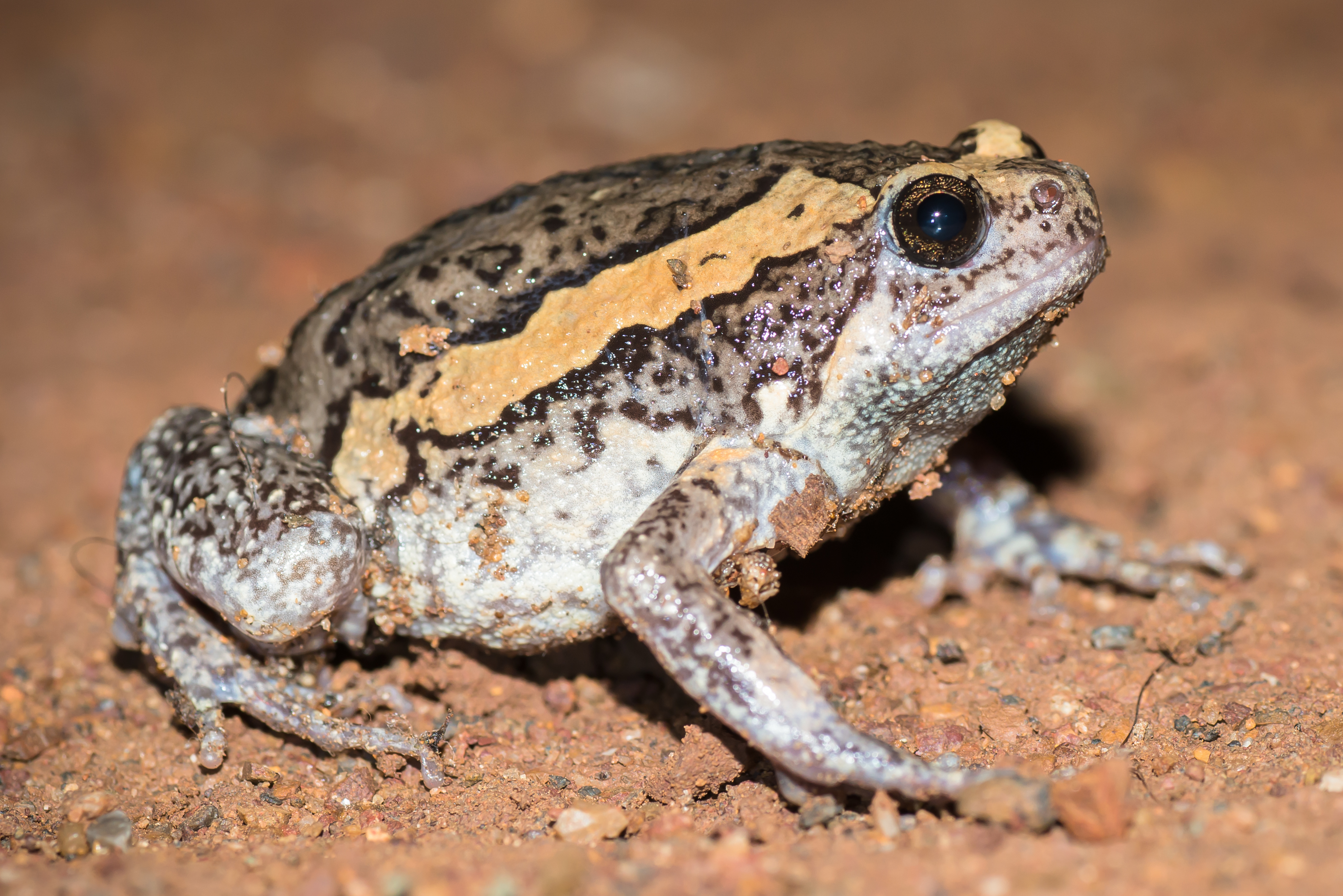
The banded bullfrog is widespread throughout Asia and also found in Taiwan.

- Kaloula pulchra (Gray, 1831)
- Microhyla butleri (Boulenger, 1900)
- Microhyla fissipes (Boulenger, 1884)
- Microhyla heymonsi (Vogt, 1911)
- Micryletta steinegeri (Boulenger, 1909) — endemic

Family Ranidae — true frogs

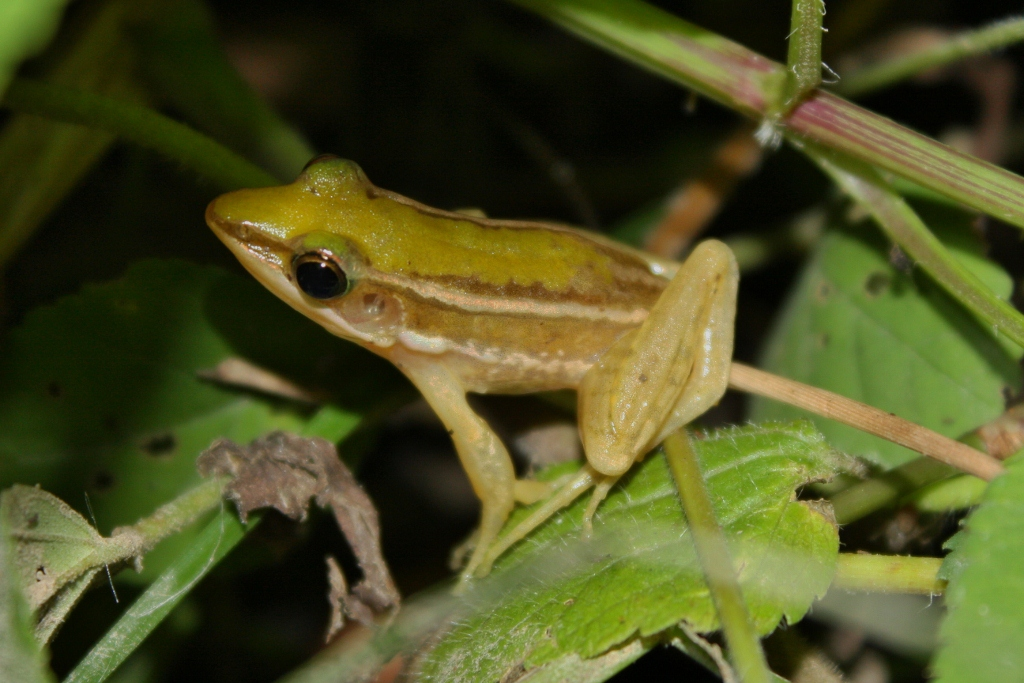
Hylarana taipehensis was first described from Taiwan but is widely distributed in Southeast and East Asia

- Nidirana adenopleura (Boulenger, 1909)
- Nidirana shyhhuangi (Lin, Chang, Matsui, Shen, Tominaga & Lin, 2025)
- Hylarana latouchii (Boulenger, 1899)
- Hylarana taipehensis (Van Denburgh, 1909)
- Lithobates catesbeianus (Shaw, 1802) — introduced
- Odorrana swinhoana (Boulenger, 1903) — endemic
- Pelophylax fukienensis (Pope, 1929)
- Rana longicrus (Stejneger, 1898)
- Rana sauteri (Boulenger, 1909) — endemic
- Sylvirana guentheri (Boulenger, 1882)

Family Rhacophoridae — flying frogs or Afro-Asian treefrogs

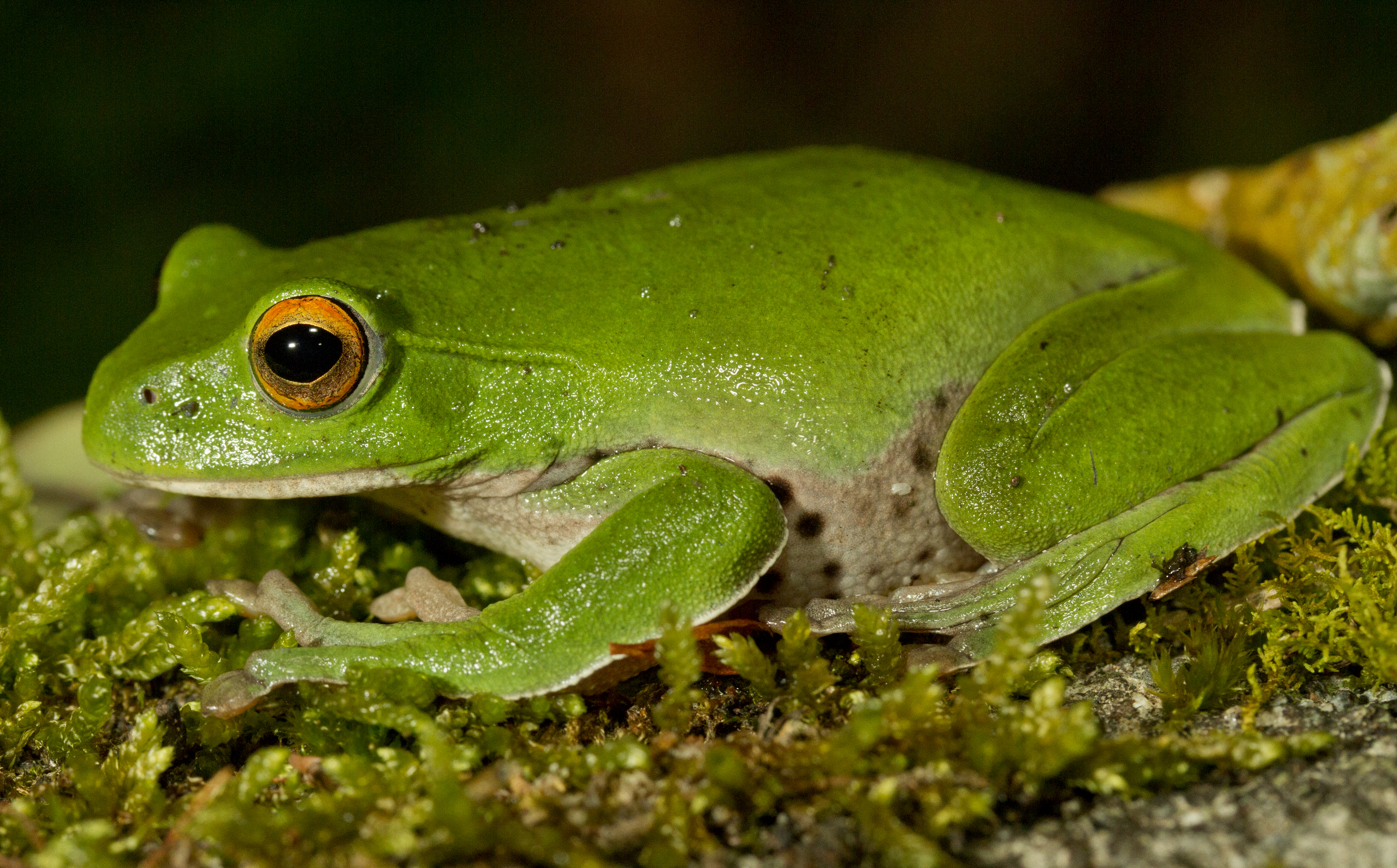
Zhangixalus moltrechti is endemic to Taiwan, inhabiting hilly forests.

Subfamily Buergeriinae

- Buergeria choui (Matsui [fr] and Tominaga, 2020)
- Buergeria otai (Wang, Hsiao, Lee, Tseng, Lin, Komaki, and Lin, 2017) — endemic
- Buergeria robusta (Boulenger, 1909) — endemic

Subfamily Rhacophorinae

- Kurixalus berylliniris (Wu, Huang, Tsai, Li, Jhang, and Wu, 2016) — endemic
- Kurixalus eiffingeri (Boettger, 1895)
- Kurixalus idiootocus (Kuramoto and Wang, 1987) — endemic
- Kurixalus wangi (Wu, Huang, Tsai, Li, Jhang, and Wu, 2016) — endemic
- Polypedates braueri (Vogt, 1911)
- Polypedates megacephalus (Hallowell, 1861) — introduced
- Zhangixalus arvalis (Lue, Lai, and Chen, 1995) — endemic
- Zhangixalus aurantiventris (Lue, Lai, and Chen, 1994) — endemic
- Zhangixalus moltrechti (Boulenger, 1908) — endemic
- Zhangixalus prasinatus (Mou, Risch, and Lue, 1983) — endemic
- Zhangixalus taipeianus (Liang and Wang, 1978) — endemic

Family Eleutherodactylidae

Subfamily Eleutherodactylinae

- Eleutherodactylus planirostris (Cope, 1862) — introduced

== Caudata (salamanders) ==
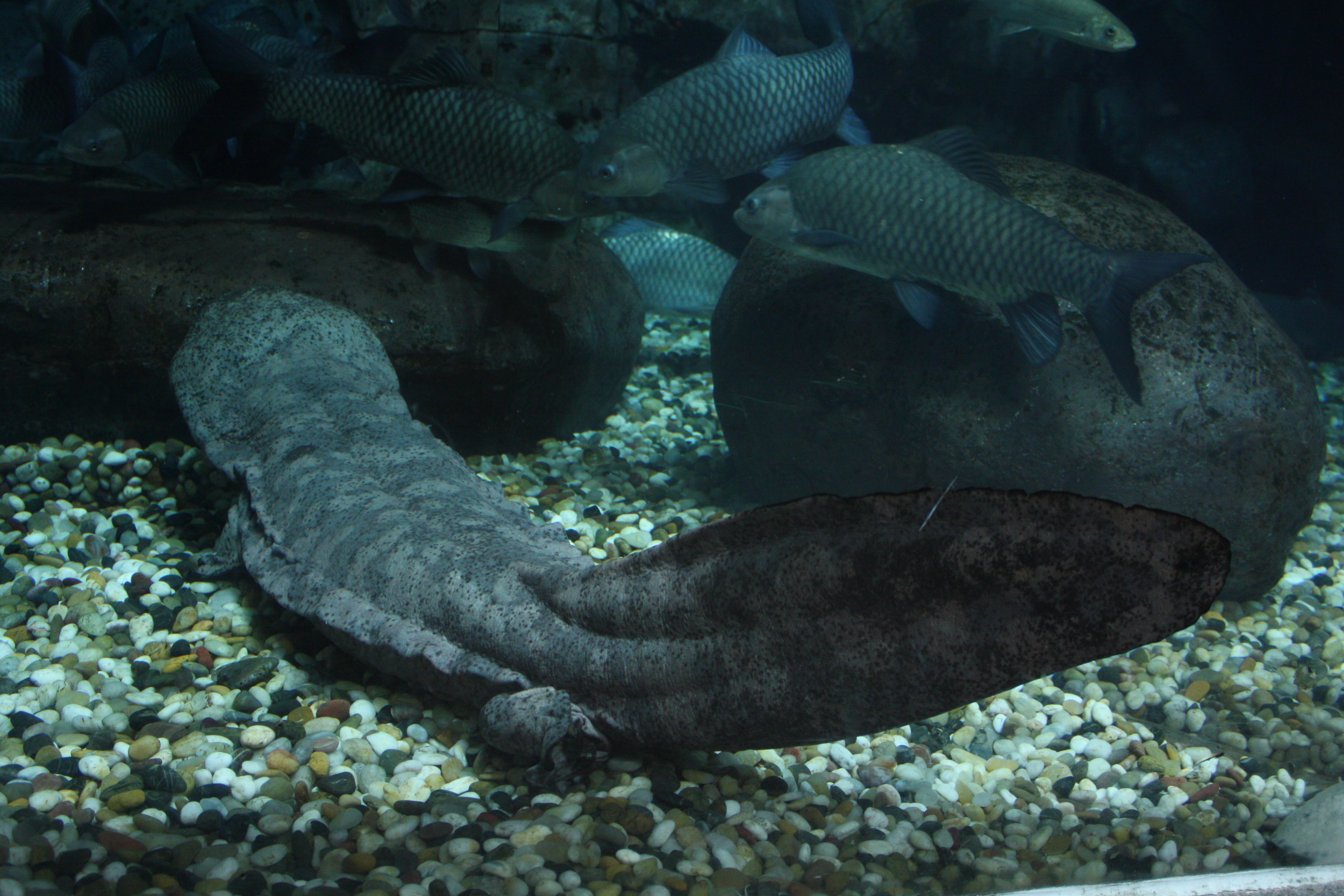
Andrias davidianus, believed to be an introduced species

Family Cryptobranchidae — giant salamanders

- Andrias davidianus (Blanchard, 1871) — introduced (likely)

Family Hynobiidae — Asian salamanders

- Hynobius arisanensis Maki, 1922 — endemic
- Hynobius formosanus Maki, 1922 — endemic
- Hynobius fucus Lai and Lue, 2008 — endemic
- Hynobius glacialis Lai and Lue, 2008 — endemic
- Hynobius sonani (Maki, 1922) — endemic

Family Salamandridae — newts

- Echinotriton andersoni (Boulenger, 1892) — extinct in Taiwan
