= Kurixalus motokawai =

Conservation status
- Vulnerable (IUCN 3.1)

Scientific classification
- Kingdom: Animalia
- Phylum: Chordata
- Class: Amphibia
- Order: Anura
- Family: Rhacophoridae
- Genus: Kurixalus
- Species: K. motokawai

Binomial name
- Kurixalus motokawai Nguyen, Matsui & Eto, 2014

Species of frog endemic to Vietnam

Kurixalus motokawai, the Kon Tum frilled tree frog, is a species of frog in the family Rhacophoridae. It is endemic to Vietnam's Annamite Mountains. It has been observed between 1050 and 1400 meters above sea level.

The skin of the dorsum is brown in color with darker brown marks. Mitochondrial DNA analysis indicates this frog is most similar to Kurixalus banaensis and Kurixalus viridescens

This frog is found in evergreen forests and scrublands on the slopes of tall hills. It perches .5 to 1 meters above the ground. It has shown some tolerance to habitat disturbance. Scientists believe it may lay eggs in holes in trees that have water in them, like other frogs in Kurixalus.

Scientists classify this as vulnerable to extinction. Its range includes two protected parks: Ngoc Linh Nature Reserve and Kon Ka Kinh National Park. Both these areas are subject to deforestation associated with farming. The construction of hydroelectric dams cause floods and earthquakes in its habitat.
