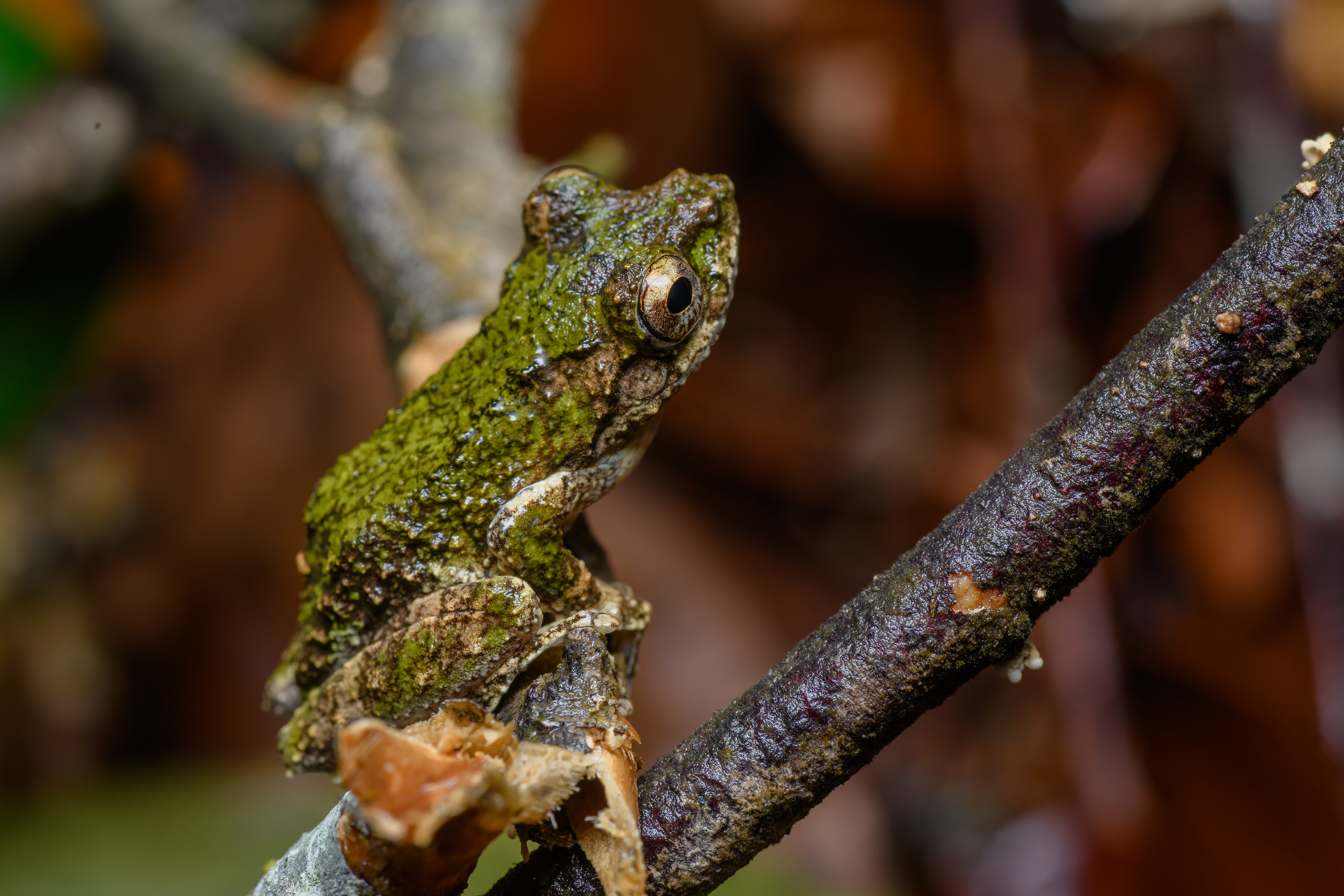
- Kurixalus bisacculus from Phu Kradueng National Park

Conservation status
- Least Concern (IUCN 3.1)

Scientific classification
- Kingdom: Animalia
- Phylum: Chordata
- Class: Amphibia
- Order: Anura
- Family: Rhacophoridae
- Genus: Kurixalus
- Species: K. bisacculus

Binomial name
- Kurixalus bisacculus (Taylor, 1962)

Synonyms
- Rhacophorus bisacculus Taylor, 1962; Rhacophorus hainanus Zhao, Wang, and Shi, 2005; Kurixalus hainanus (Zhao, Wang, and Shi, 2005)

= Kurixalus bisacculus =

Species of amphibian

Kurixalus bisacculus (common name: Taylor's tree frog and many others) is a species of frog in the family Rhacophoridae. It is found in Southeast Asia and southern China. Because of confusion with other species (Kurixalus odontotarsus, Kurixalus verrucosus), the distribution is not well mapped but includes Thailand, Cambodia, Laos, Vietnam, and China. Populations from Hainan were formerly treated as a separate species, Rhacophorus hainanus (Hainan small treefrog), but molecular data suggest they are conspecific with Kurixalus bisacculus.

== Description ==
Males from Thailand measure 29–36 mm (1.1–1.4 in) in snout–vent length; males from the Cardamon Mountains (Cambodia) measure 27–31 mm (1.1–1.2 in) in snout–vent length. The female paratype measures 29 mm (1.1 in) in snout–vent length. The dorsum is brown with some darker markings; the venter is whitish to yellowish white. The tympanum is large. The snout is pointed at tip and extends into a dermal projection, especially in females. All fingers have rudiments of webbing. The toes are up to three-fourths webbed. The chin, venter, and undersides of femurs are granulate. The undersides of the arms and tarsi have a row of tubercles, continuing onto the outer digits.

Specimens from Hainan possess an internal vocal sac, whereas specimens from Thailand have an external one. In light of molecular evidence, this difference is considered to represent intraspecific variation.

== Habitat and conservation ==
Kurixalus bisacculus has been observed between 103 and 2000 meters above sea level. It is found in vegetation or arboreally in scrubby areas, evergreen forest, mixed bamboo forest, and forest borders. It has also been seen on rubber and banana plantations, but the degree to which it can tolerate habitat disturbance is unknown as of its 2023 IUCN assessment. It is classified as least concern of extinction because, although it has only been seen in a few places, scientists believe it has a large range. That range is threatened, however, by deforestation and wildfires. This frog is also collected in China for human consumption and use in traditional Chinese medicine.

== Photos ==
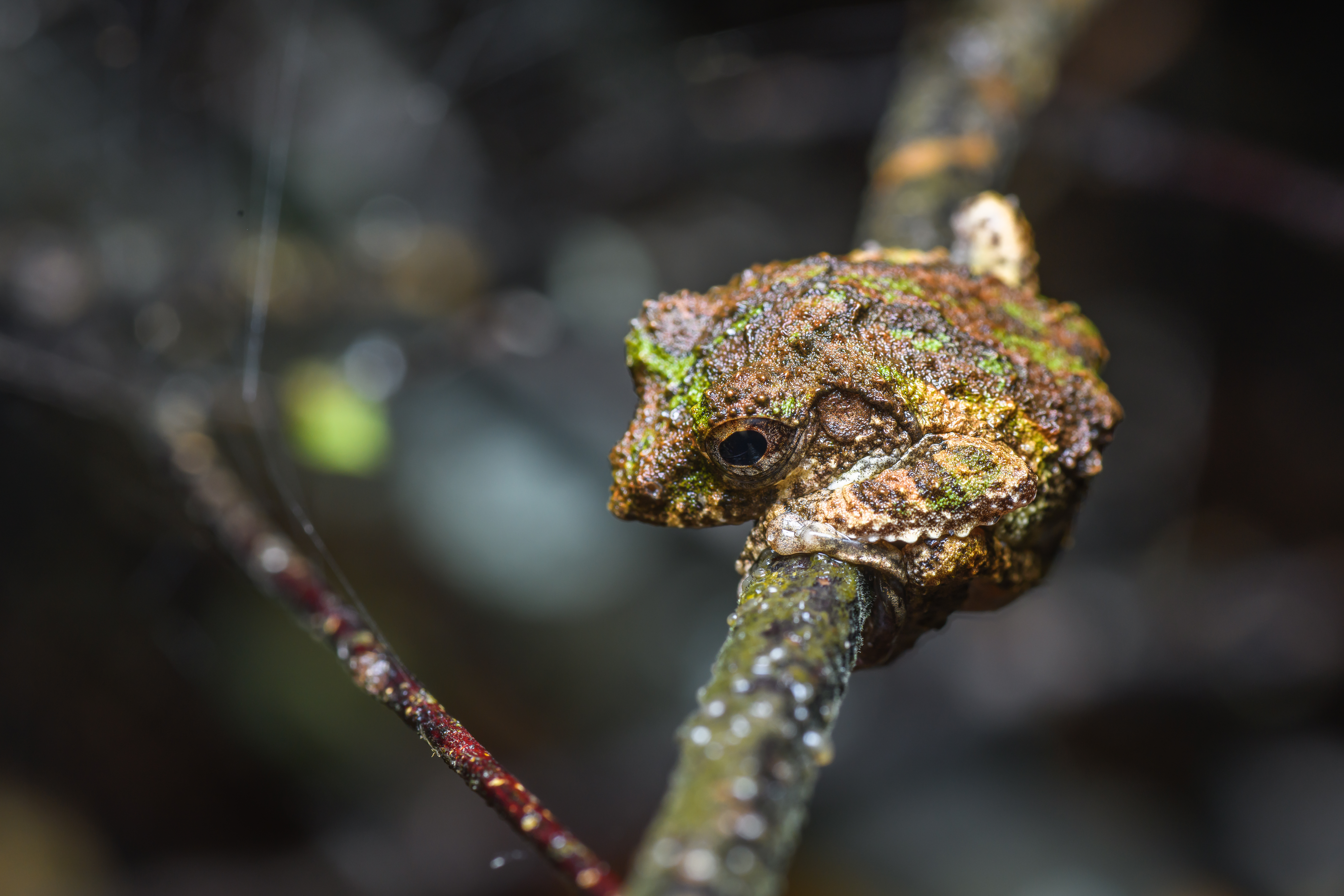
Kurixalus bisacculus (camouflage as moss) — Phu Kradueng National Park

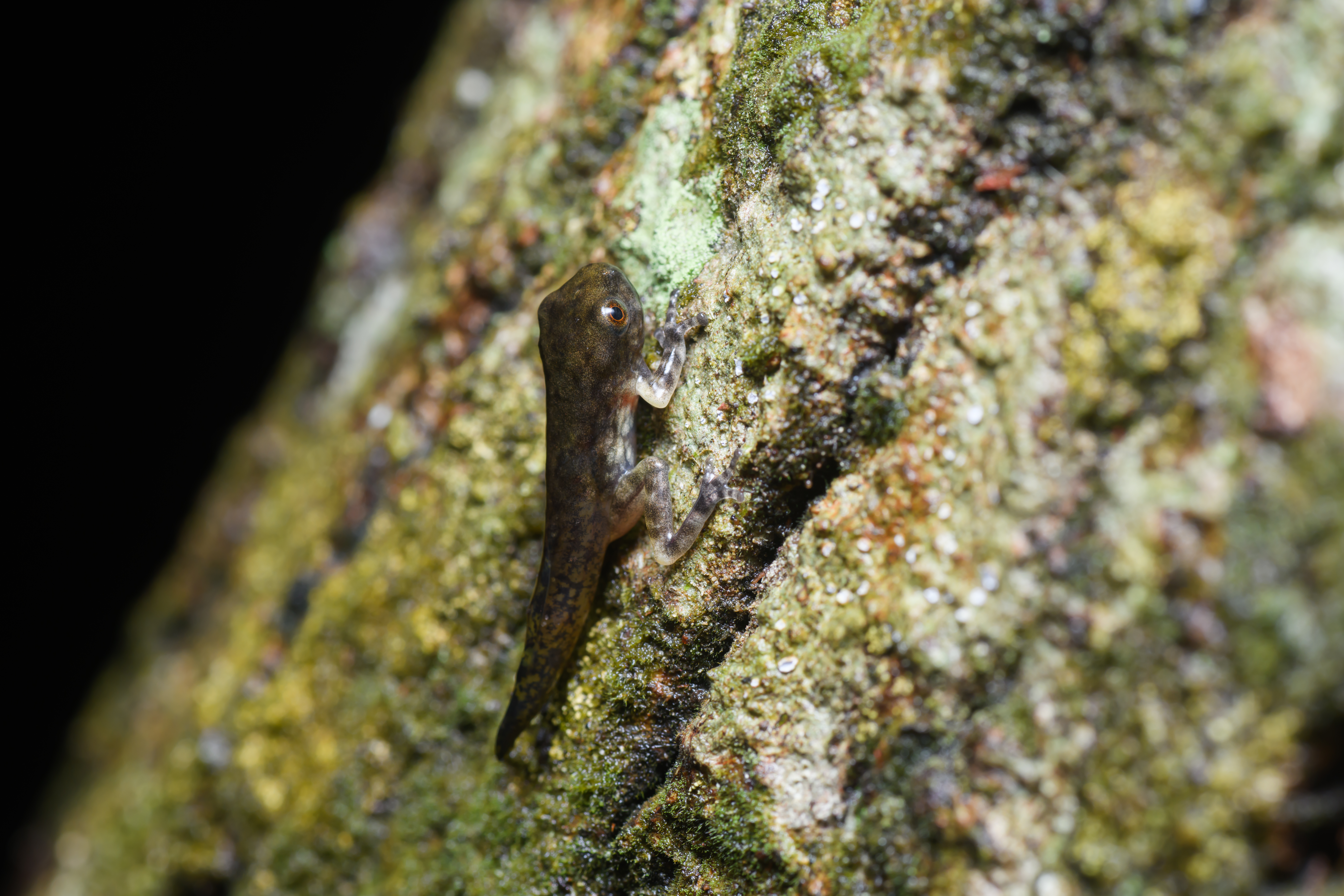
Kurixalus bisacculus (froglet) — Phu Kradueng National Park
