= Shuanglianpi Wetland =

Taiwan wetland biodiversity threats management

Coordinates: 24°44′57″N 121°38′17″E

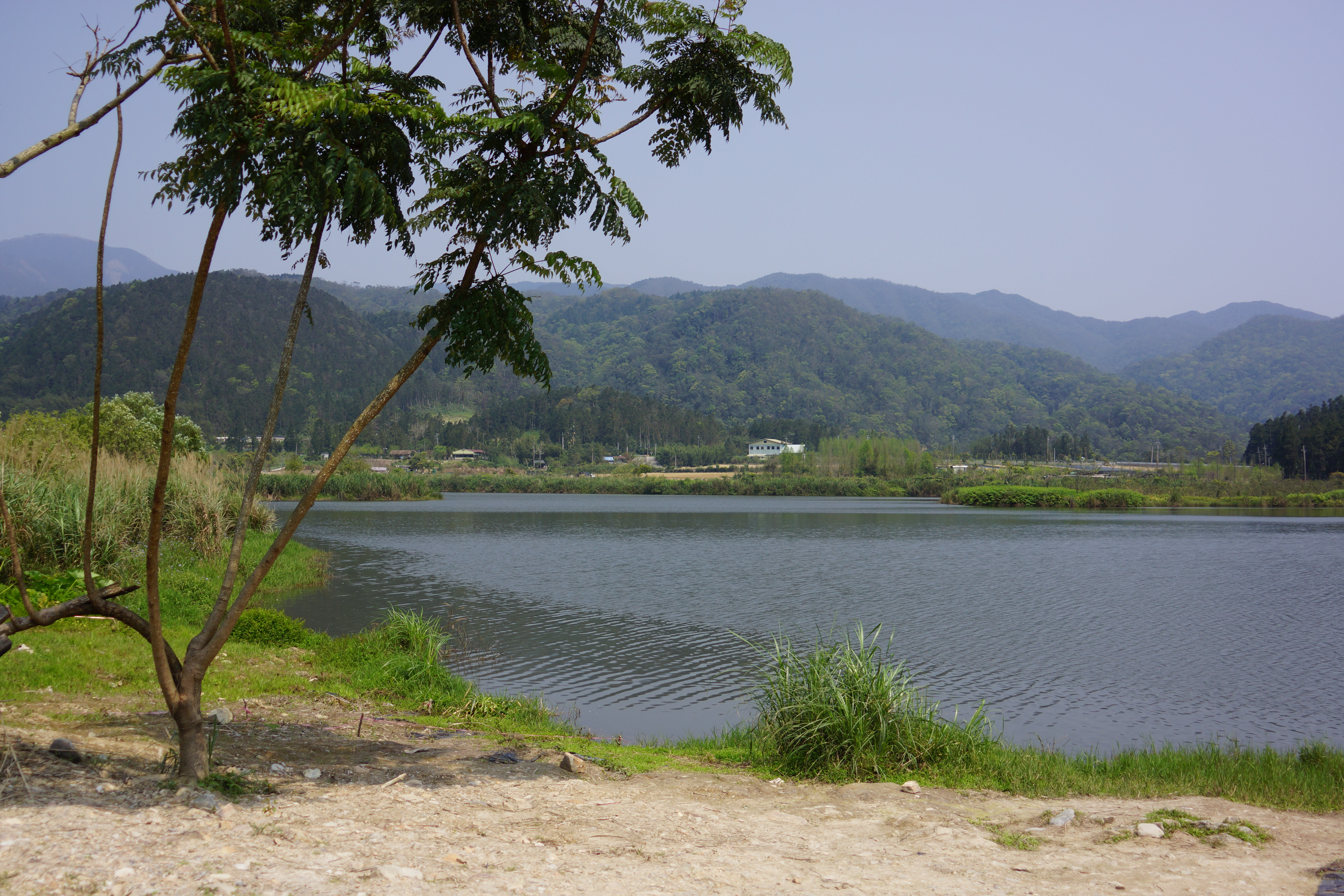
Shuanglianpi Wetland

Shuanglianpi Wetland (Chinese: 雙連埤) is a partially protected natural area located in Yilan County, northern Taiwan. Situated at an elevation of 470 meters above sea level, it features a botanically rich, shallow lake. Due to its high plant species density, the Forestry Bureau of Taiwan considers it a wetland of global significance.

The wetland encompasses 17.16 hectares of water surface and shorezone fringe, which are designated as a Wildlife Refuge by Taiwan.

== Biodiversity ==
=== Flora ===
Shuanglianpi hosts 112 species, representing over one-third of Taiwan's native aquatic plant diversity. In total, the wetland area contains 321 vascular plant taxa from 105 families.

Threatened species according to the Taiwan Red List of Vascular Plants include Salix kusanoi (endangered), Pogostemon stellatus (endangered), Limnophila trichophylla (endangered), Eleocharis ochrostachys (endangered), Utricularia aurea (endangered), Brasenia schreberi (vulnerable), and Cyperus platystylis (vulnerable). Of these, Salix kusanoi is particularly noteworthy as it is endemic to Taiwan and known from only two locations. Additionally, Shuanglianpi is the only known location in Taiwan where Trapa bispinosa can be found.

Floating floral mats formed by emergent vegetation and humus that drift with the wind are another feature of Shuanglianpi. These "floating islands" are unique in Taiwan, mediating light entering the water and contributing to both species richness and improved water quality.

=== Fauna ===
Shuanglianpi is home to 58 species of dragonfly and 32 other kinds of aquatic insect, some of which are endemic to Taiwan or the wider region. Additionally, 206 insect taxa are found in the surrounding terrestrial habitats.

Sources vary on the diversity of birdlife, with the number of species ranging from 39 to over 70. Some species are unique to Taiwan, including the Taiwan blue magpie (Urocissa caerulea), Taiwan scimitar babbler (Pomatorhinus musicus), black-necklaced scimitar babbler (Pomatorhinus erythrocnemis), Taiwan yuhina (Yuhina brunneiceps), Taiwan whistling thrush (Myophonus insularis), and Taiwan barbet (Psilopogon nuchalis). The long-tailed shrike (Lanius schach), Mandarin duck (Aix galericulata), and common teal (Anas crecca), which are threatened on the Taiwan Red List of Birds, are also reported.

Shuanglianpi's herpetofauna includes approximately 18 reptile and 19 amphibian species. Notable amphibians endemic to Taiwan include the central Formosa toad (Bufo bankorensis), temple tree frog (Kurixalus idiootocus), Nantou flying frog (Zhangixalus moltrechti), tributary flying frog (Zhangixalus prasinatus), bangkimtsing frog (Odorrana swinhoana), long-legged brown frog (Rana longicrus), and Taipei flying frog (Zhangixalus taipeianus). This limited geographic range also applies to at least two reptiles: the Formosa grass lizard (Takydromus formosanus) and the Formosa slug snake (Pareas formosensis).

Among the herpetofauna, various taxa are threatened with extinction according to IUCN evaluations: the Taipei flying frog (vulnerable at the national level), long-legged brown frog (vulnerable globally), and Chinese softshell turtle (Pelodiscus sinensis, vulnerable globally).

At least 16 fish species are represented at Shuanglianpi as well. These include the rosy bitterling (Rhodeus ocellatus), which is thought to have been originally endemic to Taiwan; the Taiwan Venus fish (Aphyocypris kikuchii), which is both endemic to Taiwan and endangered; the river loach (Formosania lacustre), another endemic species; and the Japanese rice fish (Oryzias latipes), which is vulnerable to extinction at the national level.

Other species categories such as mammals require further research.

== Threats ==
The ecosystem at Shuanglianpi faces threats from invasive species and agriculture in the surrounding area. However, rural depopulation might be reducing farming pressure. Additional threats include eutrophication and hydrological interventions, along with various human disturbances over the years. A nearby road may also obstruct water flow.

== Management ==
The goals of the Shuanglianpi Wildlife Refuge include the conservation of lowland Machilus-Castanopsis sub-montane evergreen broadleaved forest habitat, maintenance of unique genetic diversity in Taiwan, and the establishment of resources and trained personnel for public communication. Additionally, the refuge aims to revitalize habitats for the fish species Oryzias latipes and the tributary flying frog (Zhangixalus prasinatus), whose entire global range is confined to northern Taiwan, as well as other endangered taxa. Other goals include guaranteeing the ecological integrity of succession processes, conserving biological diversity, and promoting sustainable community development through green economic practices.

A Taiwanese non-governmental organization called the Society of Wilderness contributes to the day-to-day management of the Shuanglianpi Wildlife Refuge. Since 2010, it has collaborated with Wistron, a publicly listed electronics manufacturer, which supports conservation, habitat revitalization, and education through the Wistron Foundation. Additional financial support for the protected area is also provided by the local government.
