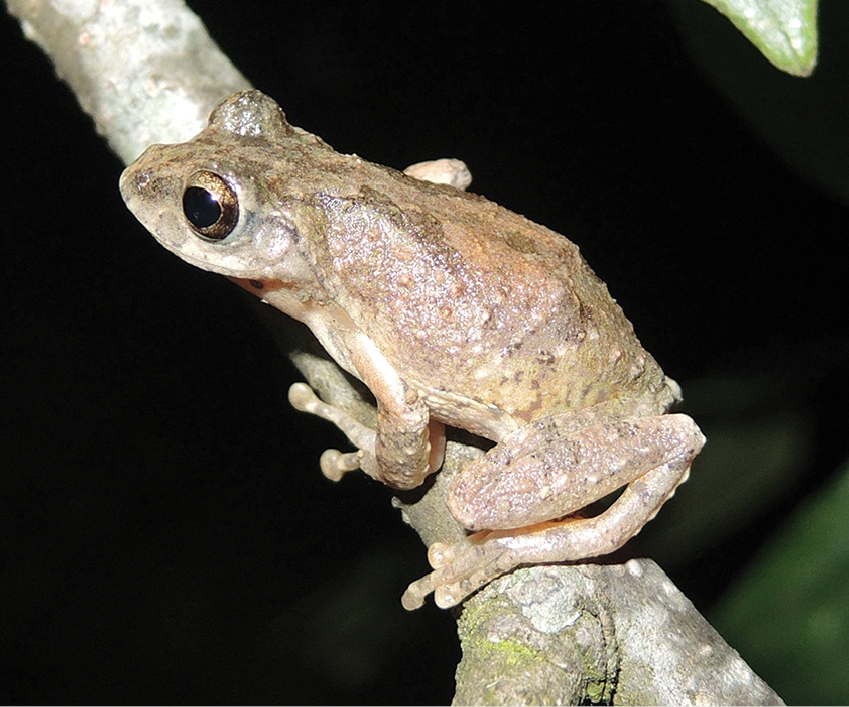

Conservation status
- Near Threatened (IUCN 3.1)

Scientific classification
- Kingdom: Animalia
- Phylum: Chordata
- Class: Amphibia
- Order: Anura
- Family: Rhacophoridae
- Genus: Kurixalus
- Species: K. lenquanensis

Binomial name
- Kurixalus lenquanensis Yu, Wang, Hou, Rao, and Yang, 2017

= Kurixalus lenquanensis =

Species of frog

Kurixalus lenquanensis is a species of frog in the family Rhacophoridae. It is endemic to southeastern Yunnan, China, and is only known from Mengzi and Gejiu, in the Honghe Hani and Yi Autonomous Prefecture. Its type locality is the eponymous Lenquan Village in Mengzi. Its closest known relative is Kurixalus idiootocus from Taiwan.

== Description ==
Adult males measure 25–29 mm (1.0–1.1 in) in snout–vent length. Females are unknown. The snout is obtusely pointed without prominence on its tip. The tympanum and sypratympanic fold are distinct. The finger and toe tips bear discs with circum-marginal and transverse ventral grooves. The fingers have basal webbing whereas the toes moderately webbed. The dorsal and lateral surfaces are coarse with small, and irregular tubercles. The dorsum is grayish brown with dark brown saddle-shaped mark; in some individuals, the mark can be X-shaped or even absent. There is a dark-brown inverted triangle-shaped mark between eyes. The head and the tympanic region are laterally brown with dark brown spot below the canthus. A broad dark brown bar runs along the canthus rostralis. The limbs are dorsally brown with clear dark brown barring and otherwise light to faint yellow with scattered brown spots. The chest and abdomen are white and nearly immaculate, or in some individuals, scattered with fine brown spots. The chin is clouded with black. The iris is golden brown.

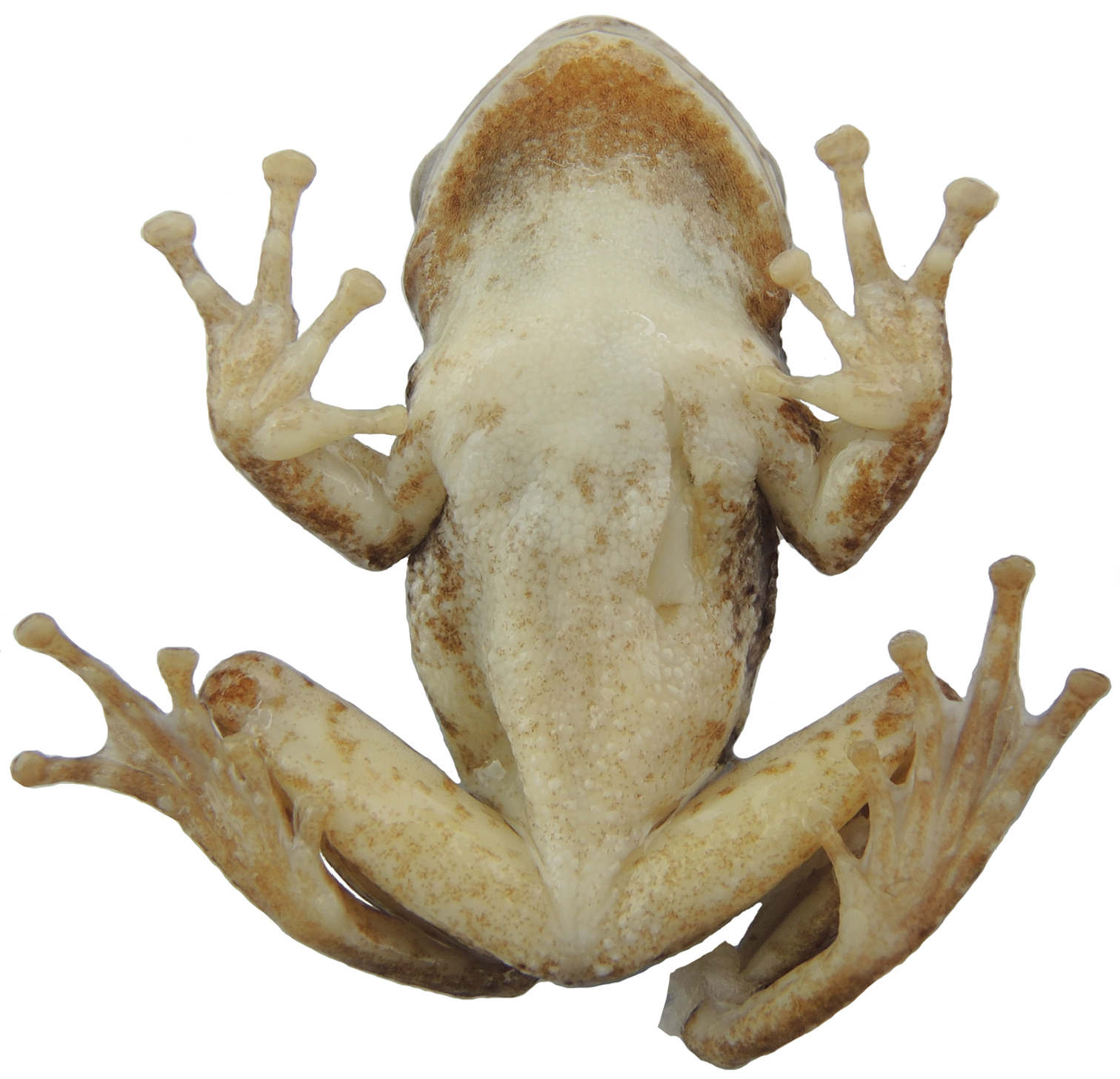
Ventral view

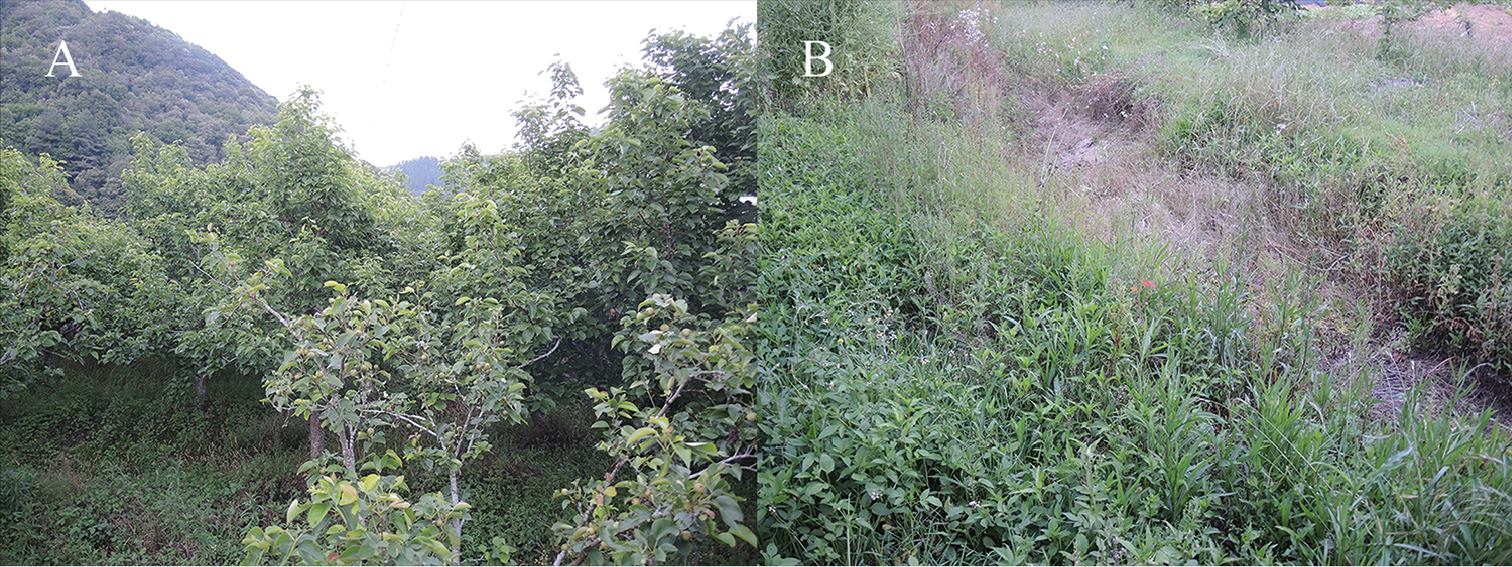
Habitat at the type locality: fruit garden (left) and dry puddle (right).

== Habitat and conservation ==
Kurixalus lenquanensis has been collected from vegetation near a dry puddle at its type locality and from vegetation near a reservoir at the other known locality. Males began to call at dusk. IUCN characterizes these areas as having montane scrub vegetation. It is known from about 1,622 m (5,322 ft) above sea level, although its true altitudinal range could be much wider, 1,000–2,000 m (3,300–6,600 ft).

Kurixalus lenquanensis is an uncommon species with a limited range. Its known range is within the Daweishan Nature Reserve where it is not facing any threats. Outside the reserve, it could suffer from habitat loss.
