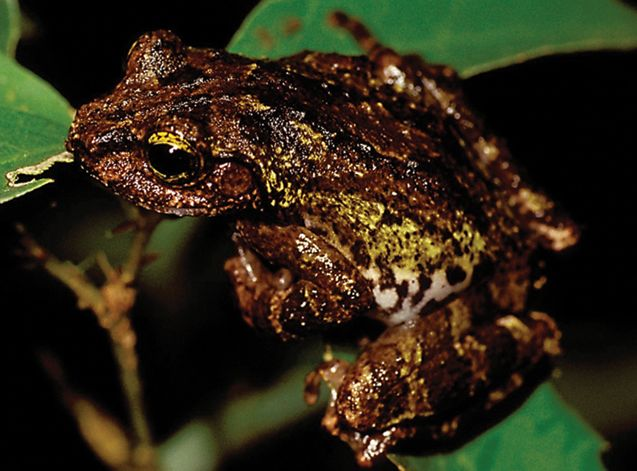
- Kurixalus berylliniris holotype, an adult male

Conservation status
- Data Deficient (IUCN 3.1)

Scientific classification
- Kingdom: Animalia
- Phylum: Chordata
- Class: Amphibia
- Order: Anura
- Family: Rhacophoridae
- Genus: Kurixalus
- Species: K. berylliniris

Binomial name
- Kurixalus berylliniris Wu, Huang, Tsai, Li, Jhang, and Wu, 2016

= Kurixalus berylliniris =

Species of amphibian

Kurixalus berylliniris is a species of tree frog in the family Rhacophoridae. It is endemic to Taiwan and occurs in the eastern part of the island at moderate elevations. Before its description in 2016, it was confused with Kurixalus eiffingeri. The specific name berylliniris combines the Latin words beryllin (meaning "green-colored") and iris, in reference to the green iris of this frog.

== Taxonomy and systematics ==
Kurixalus berylliniris was described in 2016. It resembles Kurixalus eiffingeri but displays some morphological differences and a different reproductive season. Furthermore, molecular data and male advertisement call differentiate it from Kurixalus eiffingeri and Kurixalus wangi, its sister species. Together these three species form a lineage that is clearly separate from Kurixalus idiootocus, the fourth Kurixalus species in Taiwan.

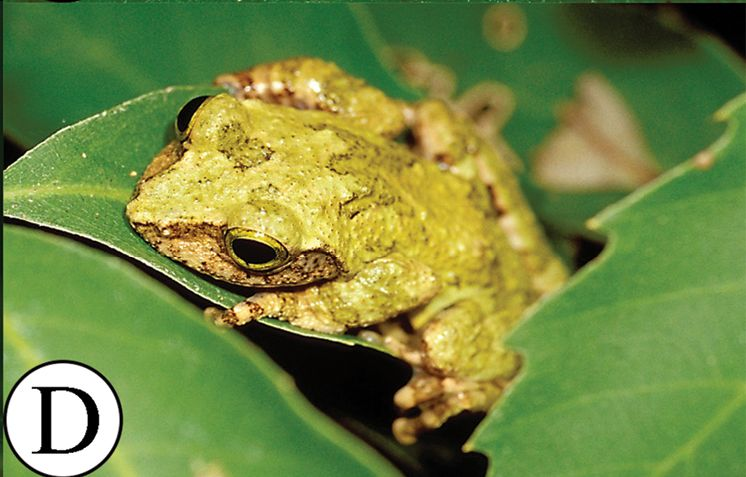
Kurixalus berylliniris — light form

== Description ==
Adult males measure 29–42 mm (1.1–1.7 in) and adult females 28–46 mm (1.1–1.8 in) in snout–vent length. The overall appearance is moderately slender and somewhat flattened. The head is wider than it is long. The tip of the snout is pointed; the snout is obtuse in lateral view. The canthus rostralis is curved and prominent. The tympanum is distinct, about half of the eye diameter; a supratympanic fold is present. The limbs are slender. The finger and toe tips are expanded into discs. The fingers are slightly webbed and the toes up to about half-webbed. Dorsal skin is granular with small tubercles. There are two color morphs, dark and light. The dark form is dark green to deep tan and has a black X-shaped blotch together with some irregular blotches; the tympanum is light yellowish-brown with small dark spots. The light form is light emerald green, with an obscured dorsal X-pattern. The venter is cream, sprinkled with minute black spots in the gular region. The iris is emerald to light green.

== Distribution ==
This species occurs in eastern Taiwan south of central Hualien, on the eastern slopes of the Central Mountain Range and in the Coastal Mountain Range.

== Habitat and conservation ==
Kurixalus berylliniris has been recorded in moist broad-leaf forests and forest edges at elevations of 225–1,250 m (738–4,101 ft) above sea level. It is arboreal. Eggs and tadpoles have been found in small pools of water in decaying trunks of tree ferns Cyathea spinulosa. The tadpoles are oophagous.

Threats to this species are unknown. Although deforestation has generally slowed down in Taiwan, loss of tree holes Kurixalus berylliniris uses for breeding is a potential threat. It is not known to occur in any protected area.
