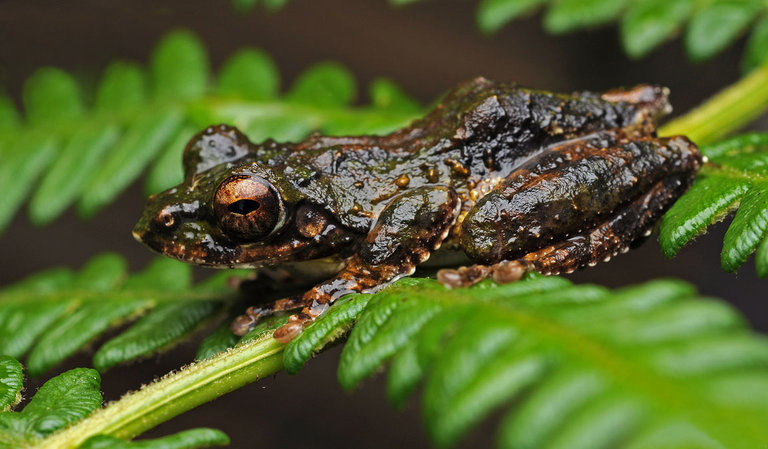

Conservation status
- Least Concern (IUCN 3.1)

Scientific classification
- Kingdom: Animalia
- Phylum: Chordata
- Class: Amphibia
- Order: Anura
- Family: Rhacophoridae
- Genus: Kurixalus
- Species: K. naso

Binomial name
- Kurixalus naso (Annandale, 1912)

Synonyms
- Rhacophorus naso Annandale, 1912; Polypedates naso (Annandale, 1912); Aquixalus (Aquixalus) naso (Annandale, 1912)

= Kurixalus naso =

Species of amphibian

Kurixalus naso, also known as uphill tree frog, long-snouted treefrog, and Annandale's high altitude frog, is a species of frog in the family Rhacophoridae. It is found in northeastern India, southern Tibet, and Bhutan. A related but unnamed species is found in Myanmar and Yunnan (China). Furthermore, it is possible that Kurixalus yangi (Yunnan, Myanmar, and NE India) is a junior synonym of Kurixalus naso.

== Description ==
Kurixalus naso is a small frog, growing to about 43 mm (1.7 in) in snout–vent length; Yu and colleagues report lengths up to 33 mm (1.3 in) for males. The snout is noticeably pointed. The limbs have serrated dermal fringes. The chin and breast are granular. Dorsal coloration is generally brownish, mixed with dark markings. The ventral surface is shaded posteriorly with dark spots. The iris is golden. Males have a single, internal vocal sac.

== Habitat and conservation ==
Kurixalus naso is an arboreal species occurring in tropical forest, shrubland and grasslands at elevations of 1,100–1,500 m (3,600–4,900 ft) above sea level. Breeding takes place in small, temporary water pools.

The overall population of Kurixalus naso is believed to be small. It is threatened by deforestation. It is present in two protected areas in northeastern India, Dihang-Dibang Biosphere Reserve and Mouling National Park.
