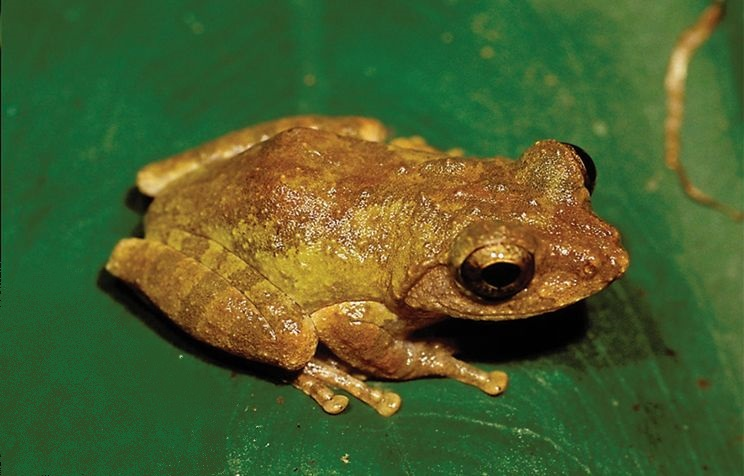
- Holotype, an adult male

Conservation status
- Data Deficient (IUCN 3.1)

Scientific classification
- Kingdom: Animalia
- Phylum: Chordata
- Class: Amphibia
- Order: Anura
- Family: Rhacophoridae
- Genus: Kurixalus
- Species: K. wangi

Binomial name
- Kurixalus wangi Wu, Huang, Tsai, Li, Jhang, and Wu, 2016

= Kurixalus wangi =

Species of amphibian

Kurixalus wangi is a species of tree frog in the family Rhacophoridae. It is endemic to Taiwan and occurs in the southernmost part of the island. Prior to its description in 2016, it was confused with Kurixalus eiffingeri. The specific name wangi honors Wang Ching-Shong, a pioneering herpetologist from Taiwan.

== Taxonomy and systematics ==
Kurixalus wangi was described in 2016. It resembles Kurixalus eiffingeri but displays some morphological differences and a different reproductive season. Furthermore, molecular data and male advertisement call differentiate it from Kurixalus eiffingeri and Kurixalus berylliniris, its sister species. Together these three species form a lineage that is clearly separate from Kurixalus idiootocus, the fourth Kurixalus species in Taiwan.

== Description ==
Adult males measure 29–32 mm (1.1–1.3 in) and adult females 31–37 mm (1.2–1.5 in) in snout–vent length. The overall appearance is slender with flat body. The head is wider than it is long. The snout is subovoid with pointed tip in dorsal view and acuminate and slightly protruding in profile. The canthus rostralis is distinct and rounded. The tympanum is distinct, less than half of the eye diameter, with its upper margin covered by the supratympanic fold. The limbs are moderately robust. The finger and toe tips are expanded into discs. The fingers have a trace of webbing and the toes are moderately webbed. Dorsal skin is shagreened, ventral skin is slightly granular. The dorsal coloration varies from light brown with distinctly dark markings (including a dark X-like marking) to almost uniformly light green. The iris is golden-yellow.

== Distribution ==
This species occurs in southernmost Taiwan in Pingtung County.

== Habitat and conservation ==
Kurixalus wangi occurs in the shrubs of secondary forests and lowland broad-leaved forests at elevations below 500 m (1,600 ft). Eggs have been found in small pools in tree hollows and man-made structures (discarded plastic cups and plastic pipes), either above the water or submerged. The tadpoles are oophagous.

Information on this species is limited, but it may be somewhat common. There are no known threats to it. Habitat loss and degradation, and any action reducing the number of tree holes, are potential threats. However, rates of deforestation have declined in Taiwan.
