= Kurixalus absconditus =

Conservation status
- Endangered (IUCN 3.1)

Scientific classification
- Kingdom: Animalia
- Phylum: Chordata
- Class: Amphibia
- Order: Anura
- Family: Rhacophoridae
- Genus: Kurixalus
- Species: K. absconditus

Binomial name
- Kurixalus absconditus Mediyansyah, Hamidy, Munir, and Matsui, 2019
- Kurixalus absconditus is only known from near Piasak, West Kalimantan, Borneo

Species of frog

Kurixalus absconditus is a species of frog in the family Rhacophoridae. It is endemic to West Kalimantan, in the Indonesian part of Borneo near the village of Piasak; it is likely to occur more widely. The specific name absconditus is Latin for "disguised", "concealed", or "hidden", and refers to this species remaining "undetected" within the Kurixalus appendiculatus group. Common name Piasak-frilled swamp treefrog, also spelled Piasak frilled swamp tree frog, has been coined for it.

== Description ==
The type series consists of one adult male measuring 27 mm (1.1 in) and two juveniles 17–20 mm (0.7–0.8 in) in snout–vent length. The head is longer than it is wide. The snout has pointed tip. The tympanum is distinct but small. The supratympanic fold is present. The limbs are slender. The finger and toe tips are expanded into round discs; those of fingers are larger than the toe ones. Finger webbing is poorly developed while toe webbing is moderately developed. The upper eyelids have a series of rounded small tubercles. The dorsum is brown with green speckles and a sparse and disjointed of dark brown saddle-shaped mark. The flanks are brown with few green speckles. The groin is whitish. The iris is bright gold and has distinct black reticulation and a black scleral ring.

Male advertisement call, females, and tadpoles of this species are not known. Scientists infer that this frog breeds by larval development and that the tadpoles swim in streams, but as of 2021, they have not confirmed this.

== Habitat and conservation ==
The type series was collected from a shrub swamp habitat close to secondary swamp forest at an elevation of 50 m (160 ft) above sea level. It shared this habitat with the frogs Amnirana nicobariensis, Chalcorana raniceps, Hylarana erythraea, Polypedates colletti, Pulchrana baramica, and Limnonectes paramacrodon. Individuals of Kurixalus absconditus were found clinging to a tree trunk and perched on leaves some 0.70–1.9 m (2–6 ft) above the ground.
