= Wistron =

Taiwanese manufacturing company

Wistron Corporation

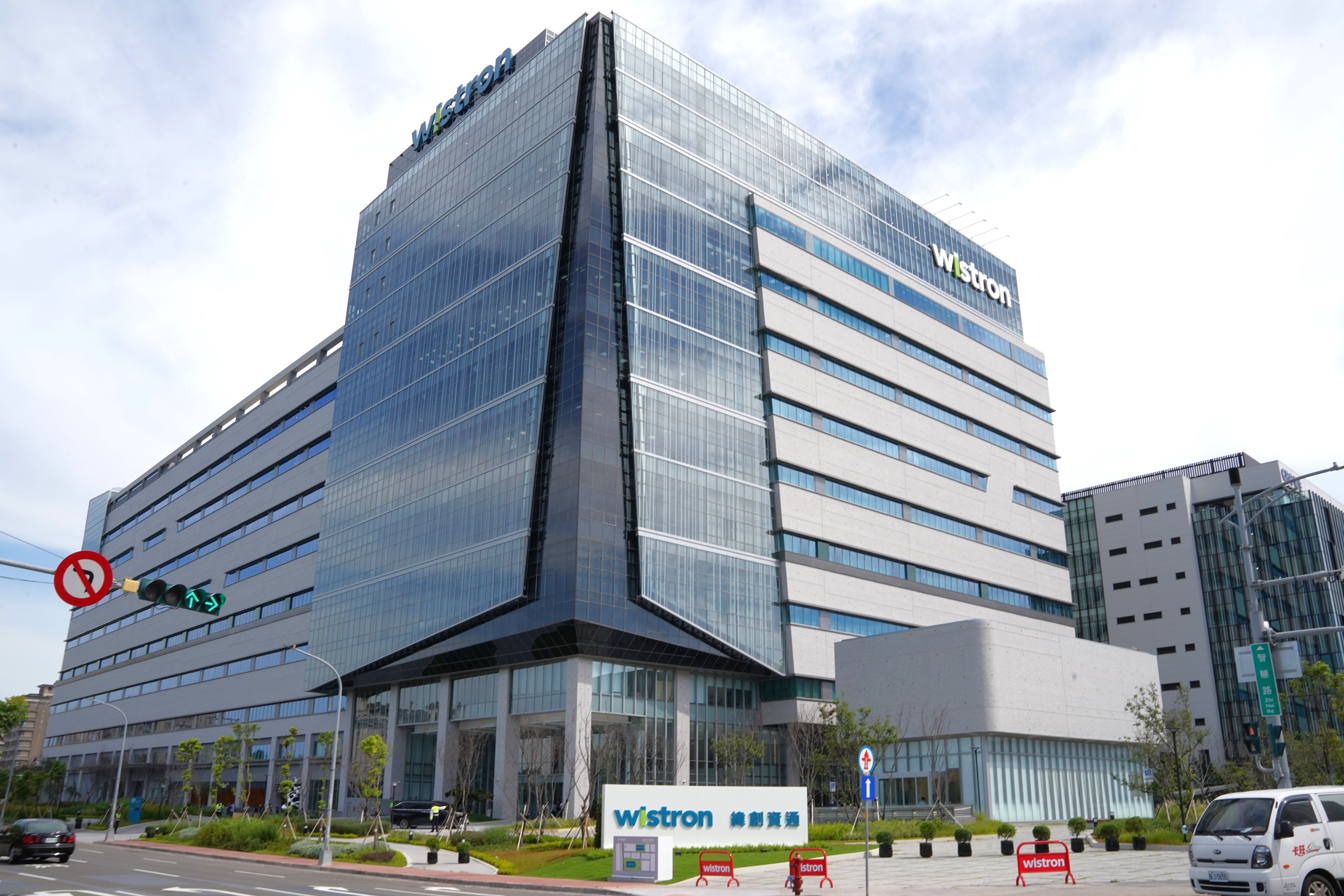
- Wistron Zhubei Headquarters
- Native name: 緯創資通股份有限公司
- Type: Public
- Traded as: TWSE: 3231
- Industry: Electronics
- Founded: 30 May 2001; 25 years ago
- Headquarters: Taipei, Taiwan
- Area served: Offices/operations in Asia, North America, Europe
- Key people: Simon Lin (Chairman and CSO); Jeff Lin (President and CEO)
- Products: Notebook PCs; desktop systems; server and storage systems; IA (information appliances); handheld devices; networking and communication products
- Revenue: ▲NT$2.19 trillion (2025) (US$70.17 billion)
- Operating income: ▲NT$78.56 billion (2025) (US$2.52 billion)
- Net income: ▲NT$27.4 billion (2025) (US$879.13 million)
- Total assets: ▲NT$608.45 billion (2025) (US$19.52 billion)
- Total equity: ▲NT$152.12 billion (2025) (US$4.88 billion)
- Number of employees: ▲68,910 (2025)
- Subsidiaries: AOpen; Wiwynn
- Website: www.wistron.com

Wistron Corporation (Chinese: 緯創資通股份有限公司; pinyin: Wěichuàng Zītōng Gǔfèn Yǒuxiàn Gōngsī) is an electronics manufacturer based in Taiwan. It was the manufacturing arm of Acer Inc. before being spun off in 2000. As an original design manufacturer, the company designs and manufactures products for other companies to sell under their brand name. Wistron products include notebook and desktop computers, servers, storage, LCD TVs, handheld devices, and devices and equipment for medical applications.

Wistron employs over 80,000 people worldwide and has 12 manufacturing bases, 10 research and development centers, and 14 customer service centers.

== History ==
Wistron emerged in 2000 from the Design and Manufacturing Services (DMS) division of Acer Inc., spun off from the Acer Group to create a clearer separation between brand-name business and OEM manufacturing. The Wistron Corporation was officially established on May 30, 2001, in Taipei as a standalone company.

On August 19, 2003, Wistron held its initial public offering (IPO) on the Taiwan Stock Exchange under the ticker symbol 3231.TW.

In 2009, joined the CDP Carbon Disclosure Project.

In July 2011, Wistron and Microsoft entered into an agreement that offered coverage under Microsoft's exclusive rights portfolio for Wistron products, including tablets, mobile phones, and other devices running the ChromeOS or Android platform.

In September 2011, Wistron signed a patent licensing agreement with Intellectual Ventures.

In 2020, the company set up a manufacturing plant in Vietnam. The 232,087.74 square meter lot is in the Dong Van III Industrial Zone in Ha Nam Province in northern Vietnam, Wistron said in a regulatory filing. The transaction would total 337.4 billion dong (US$14.6 million).

On 17 July 2020, Wistron planned to sell its Kunshan plant to mainland China's plant Luxshare for 3.3 billion renminbi yuan, and related operations are expected to be completed by the January of the following year.

== Products ==
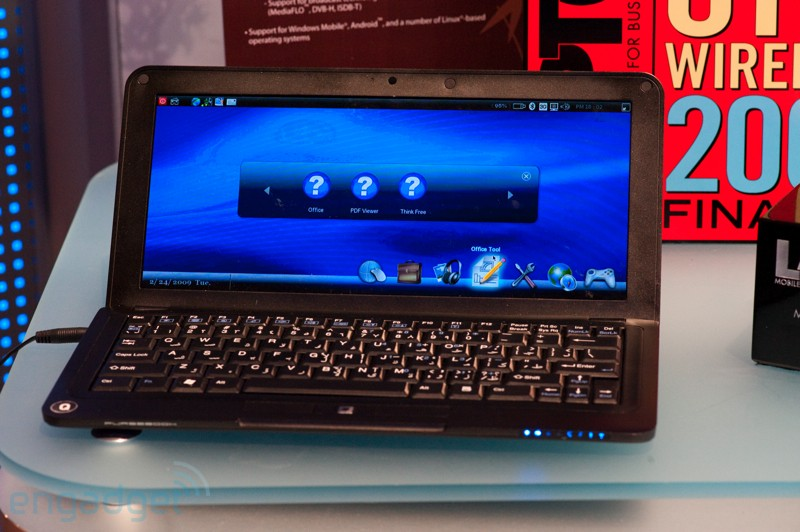
Smartbook by Wistron

Wistron is a manufacturer of information and communications technology. The company mainly produces notebooks and mobile devices such as smartphones and tablets on behalf of major electronics brands. Customers include Apple, Dell, Motorola, and Microsoft. In 2009, Wistron was the third-largest notebook manufacturer worldwide.

== Locations ==
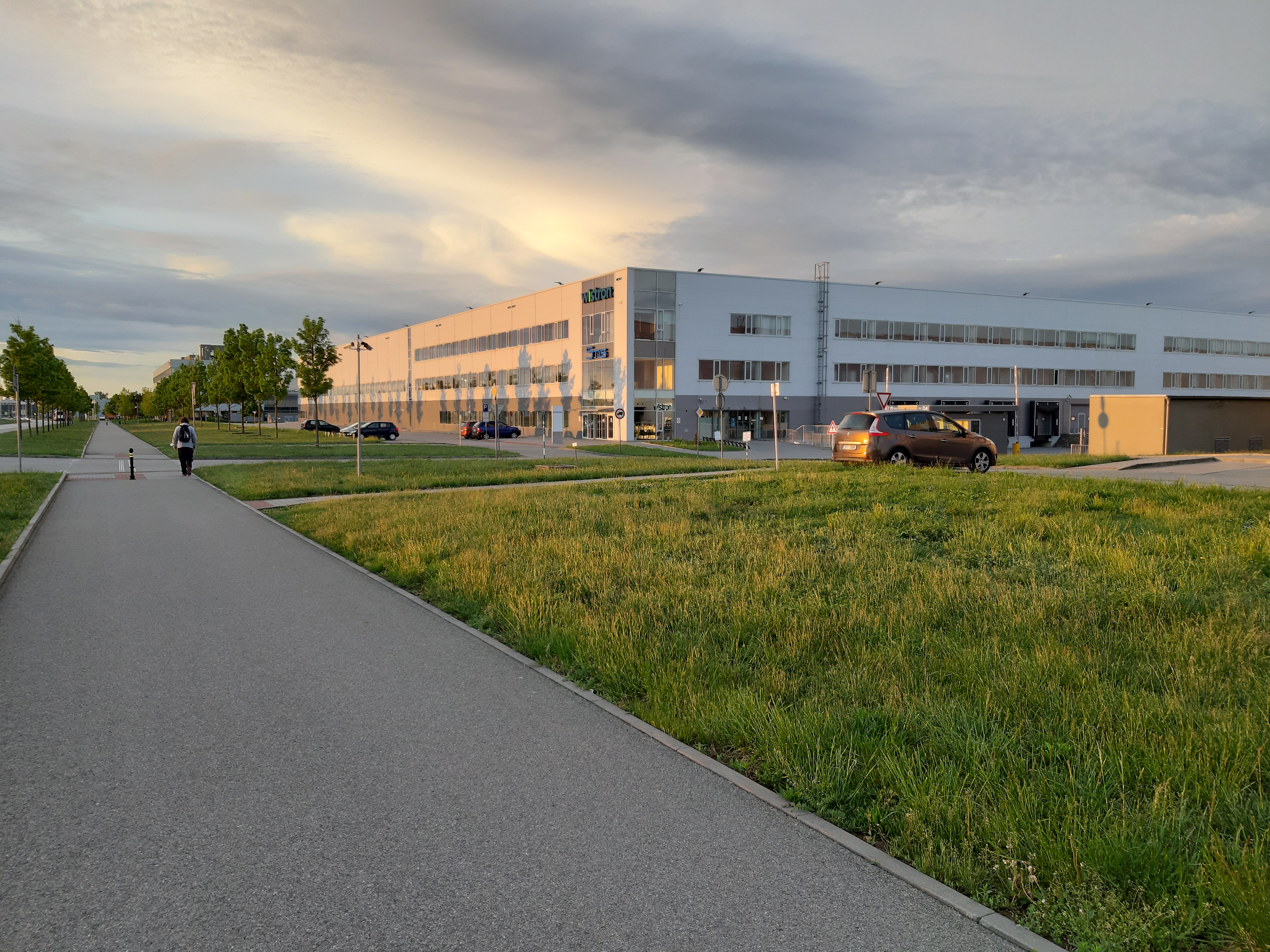
Wistron facility in Brno

Wistron has locations worldwide. Most production takes place in Asia, but there are also sites in Europe and North America. In Taipei, Taiwan, besides the headquarters, the company’s global research and development center is located.

Manufacturing facilities

- Hsinchu
- Kunshan
- Taizhou
- Chengdu
- Zhongshan
- Brno
- Ciudad Juárez
- Narsapura

== Controversy ==
=== India ===
In December 2020, 2000 workers coming off night shift rioted at a Wistron iPhone factory in Narasapura, India, causing damages estimated to $7 million. The workers claimed to have been underpaid in the previous months.

== Wetland protection ==
Via the Wistron Foundation and in cooperation with the Society of Wilderness NGO, Wistron contributes to conservation, revitalization and education for Shuanglianpi Wetland in Yilan County, Taiwan. The wetland is considered a "paradise" for aquatic plant life and holds several nationally threatened species of flora. Indeed, the ratio of its botanic diversity to surface area is considered globally significant by the Forestry Bureau of Taiwan.

== See also ==
- List of companies of Taiwan
