= Kurixalus hainanus =

Conservation status
- Least Concern (IUCN 3.1)

Scientific classification
- Kingdom: Animalia
- Phylum: Chordata
- Class: Amphibia
- Order: Anura
- Family: Rhacophoridae
- Genus: Kurixalus
- Species: K. hainanus

Binomial name
- Kurixalus hainanus (Zhao, Wang, and Shi, 2005)

Synonyms
- Rhacophorus hainanus Zhao, Wang, and Shi in Zhao, Wang, Shi, Wu, and Zhao, 2005; Aquixalus hainanus (Zhao, Wang, and Shi, 2005); Kurixalus (Aquixalus) hainanus (Zhao, Wang, and Shi, 2005)

Species of frog

Kurixalus hainanus, the Hainan frilled tree frog or Hainan small tree frog, is a species of frog in the family Rhacophoridae. It is endemic to northeastern Vietnam and to China's Guizhou, Guangxi, and Guangdong. It also lives in the mountains on Hainan Island. This frog has been observed between 630 and 710 meters above sea level.

This frog lives in evergreen forests, bamboo forests, mixed forests, and scrubby areas. This frog breeds through larval development in shallow pools.

Scientists classify this frog as at least concern of extinction because of its large range. However, it does face some threat from deforestation associated with small farms. This frog is occasionally harvested as food and as a component in traditional medicines.
