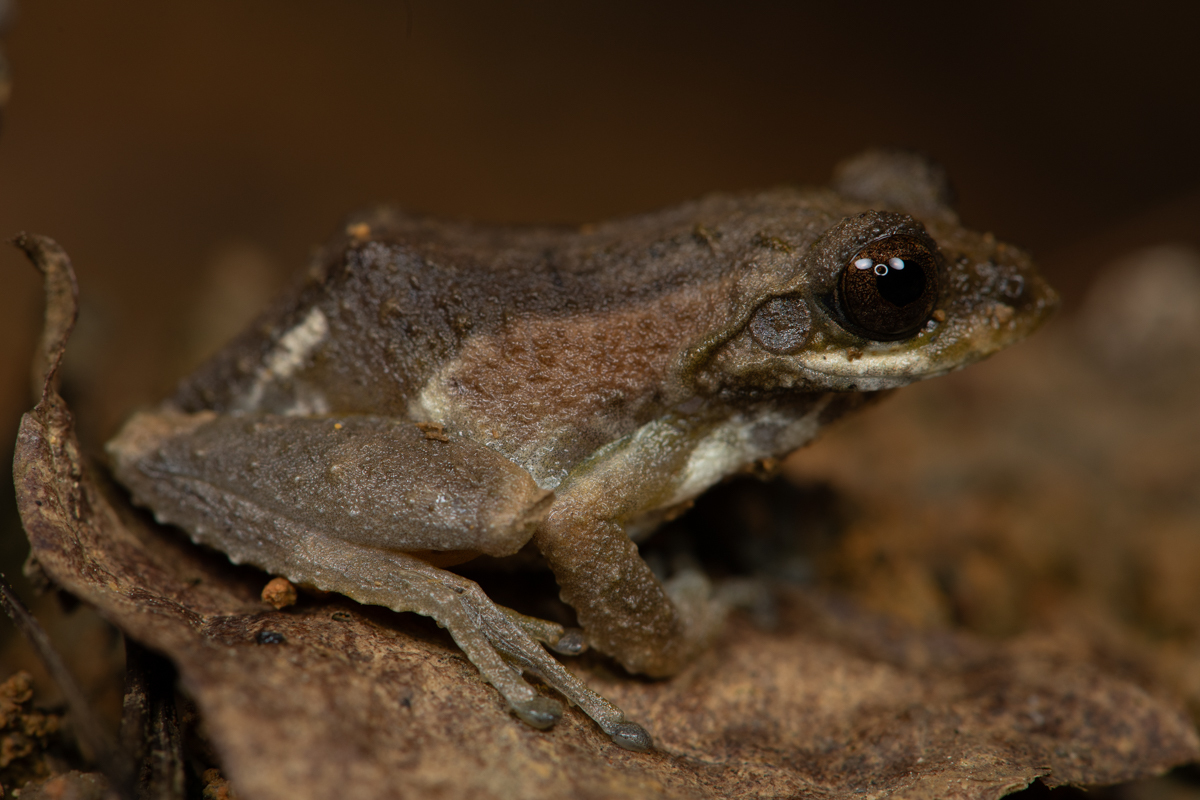

Conservation status
- Least Concern (IUCN 3.1)

Scientific classification
- Kingdom: Animalia
- Phylum: Chordata
- Class: Amphibia
- Order: Anura
- Family: Rhacophoridae
- Genus: Kurixalus
- Species: K. baliogaster

Binomial name
- Kurixalus baliogaster (Inger, Orlov, and Darevsky, 1999)

Synonyms
- Rhacophorus baliogaster Inger, Orlov, and Darevsky, 1999; Aquixalus baliogaster (Inger, Orlov, and Darevsky, 1999)

= Kurixalus baliogaster =

Species of amphibian

Kurixalus baliogaster, also known as the belly-spotted frog, is a species of frog in the family Rhacophoridae. It is found in the Central Highlands of Vietnam and the Annamite Mountains of adjacent Laos. Its range probably extends into eastern Cambodia where suitable habitat should be present. The specific name baliogaster is derived from the Greek words balios and gaster, meaning "spotted or dappled belly".

== Description ==
Adult males measure about 33 mm (1.3 in) and adult females 36–42 mm (1.4–1.7 in) in snout–vent length. The snout is obtusely pointed. The tympanum is distinct. The fingers have well-developed discs and basal webbing. The toe discs are smaller than those of fingers; the toes have extensive webbing. The dorsum is dark brown above, usually with some blackish spots running as a broken streak from the should to the groin. The flanks are lighter brown. The venter is white with conspicuous black spots.

== Habitat and conservation ==
Rhacophorus baliogaster occurs in wet evergreen forests at elevations of 600–1,780 m (1,970–5,840 ft) above sea level. Individuals have been observed perched on grassy vegetation on the banks of forest streams, while tadpoles have been recorded from a swampy forest pond.

This species is not uncommon in parts of its range. It is threatened by habitat loss and degradation caused by expanding agriculture. It has been recorded in the Xe Sap National Biodiversity Conservation Area in Laos and Bidoup Núi Bà National Park in Vietnam, and its range overlaps with some other protected areas.
