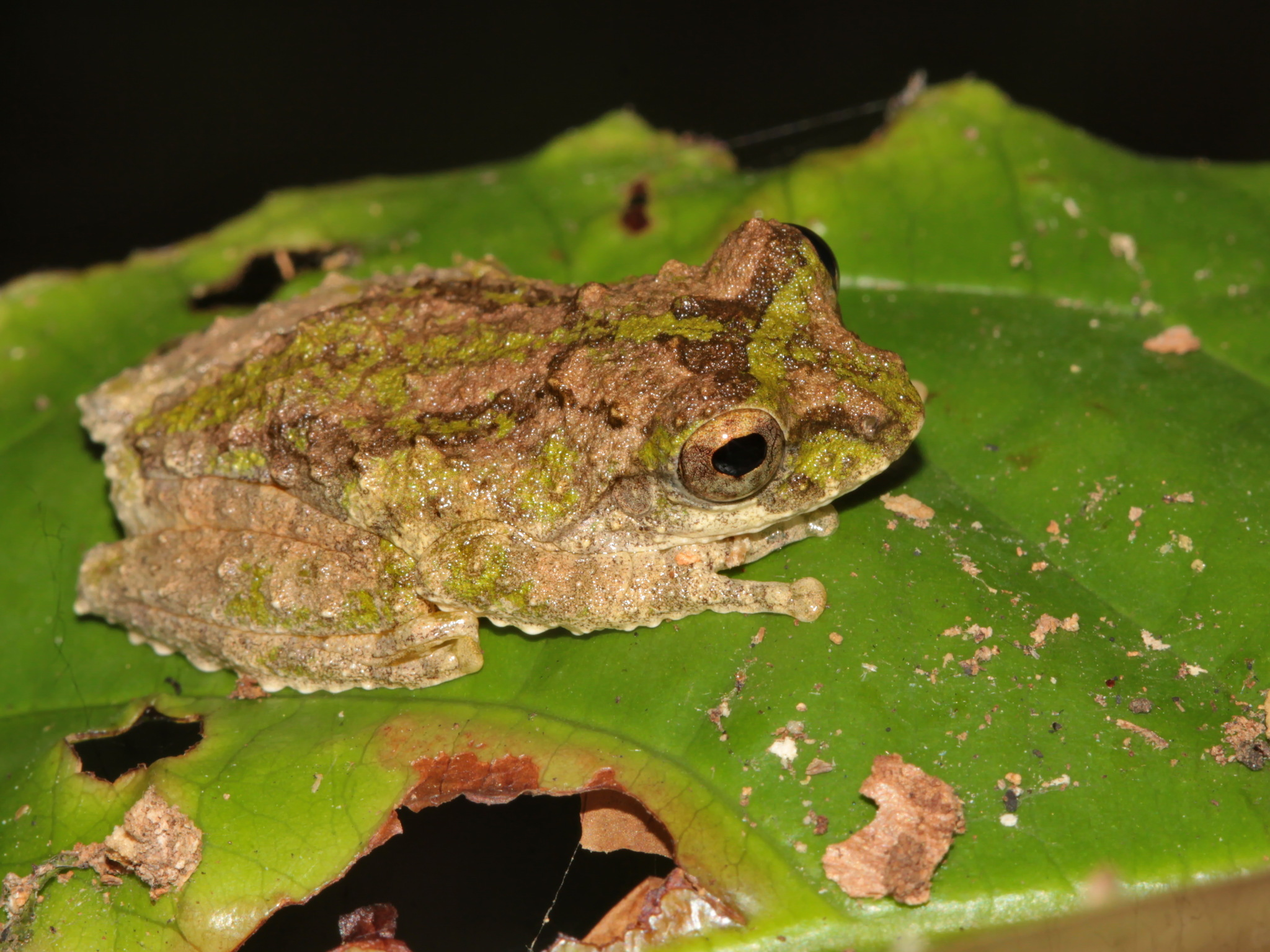

Conservation status
- Least Concern (IUCN 3.1)

Scientific classification
- Kingdom: Animalia
- Phylum: Chordata
- Class: Amphibia
- Order: Anura
- Family: Rhacophoridae
- Genus: Kurixalus
- Species: K. verrucosus

Binomial name
- Kurixalus verrucosus (Boulenger, 1893)

Synonyms
- Rhacophorus verrucosus (Boulenger, 1893)

= Kurixalus verrucosus =

Species of amphibian

Kurixalus verrucosus (Boulenger's bushfrog, small rough-armed tree frog) is a species of frog in the family Rhacophoridae found in Myanmar, Thailand, China, and Vietnam. In the past, it has been considered synonym of Rhacophorus appendiculatus (=Kurixalus appendiculatus), which, together with other confusion regarding the identity of this species, makes interpreting older literature difficult.

This frog has been observed between 200 and 2000 meters above sea level, perched on shrubs near or far from streams. Scientists are not certain whether this species is dependent on forests to survive and, despite deforestation, list it as at least concern of extinction because of its large range.
