= Kurixalus gracilloides =

Conservation status
- Data Deficient (IUCN 3.1)

Scientific classification
- Kingdom: Animalia
- Phylum: Chordata
- Class: Amphibia
- Order: Anura
- Family: Rhacophoridae
- Genus: Kurixalus
- Species: K. gracilloides

Binomial name
- Kurixalus gracilloides Nguyen, Duong, Luu, and Poyarkov, 2020

Synonyms
- Kurixalus (Kurixalus) gracilloides Nguyen, Duong, Luu, and Poyarkov, 2020

Species of frog

Kurixalus gracilloides, the gracile frilled treefrog, is a frog in the family Rhacophoridae. It is endemic to northern Vietnam's Nghệ An province, where it has been observed at elevations greater than 150 meters above sea level.

The adult male frog measures 27.9–31.2 mm long in snout-vent length. The skin of the dorsum is gold-brown in color with a saddle-shaped darker mark. There is some fringed skin on its legs. There is some webbed skin on the front feet and more on the back feet.
