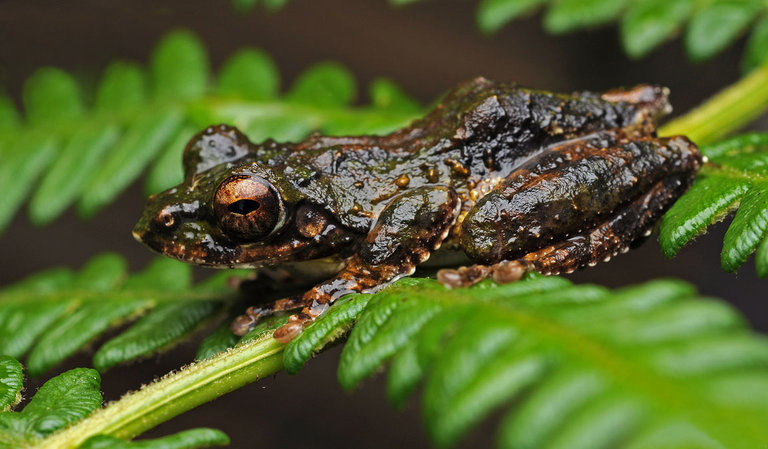
- Kurixalus naso

Scientific classification
- Kingdom: Animalia
- Phylum: Chordata
- Class: Amphibia
- Order: Anura
- Family: Rhacophoridae
- Subfamily: Rhacophorinae
- Genus: Kurixalus; Ye, Fei & Dubois in Fei, 1999

Species
- See text.

= Kurixalus =

Genus of amphibians

Kurixalus is a genus of frogs in the family Rhacophoridae. The taxonomy of small rhacophids is difficult and has been subject to many revisions, but molecular genetic data do support monophyly of Kurixalus. These frogs are distributed from Himalayan front ranges of eastern India southward and eastward to Cambodia, Vietnam, southern China, Taiwan, and the Ryukyu Islands.

== Species ==
As of 2020, the following 19 species are recognized:

- Kurixalus absconditus Mediyansyah, Hamidy, Munir, and Matsui, 2019 – Piasak-frilled swamp treefrog
- Kurixalus appendiculatus (Günther, 1858) – frilled tree frog, rough-armed tree frog, or Southeast Asian tree frog
- Kurixalus baliogaster (Inger, Orlov, and Darevsky, 1999) – belly-spotted frog
- Kurixalus banaensis (Bourret, 1939) – Bana bubble-nest frog
- Kurixalus berylliniris Wu, Huang, Tsai, Li, Jhang, and Wu, 2016
- Kurixalus bisacculus (Taylor, 1962) − Taylor's treefrog
- Kurixalus chaseni (Smith, 1924)
- Kurixalus eiffingeri (Boettger, 1895)
- Kurixalus gracilloides Nguyen, Duong, Luu, and Poyarkov, 2020
- Kurixalus hainanus (Zhao, Wang, and Shi, 2005)
- Kurixalus idiootocus (Kuramoto and Wang, 1987) – temple tree frog
- Kurixalus lenquanensis Yu, Wang, Hou, Rao, and Yang, 2017
- Kurixalus motokawai Nguyen, Matsui, and Eto, 2014
- Kurixalus naso (Annandale, 1912) – uphill tree frog, long-snouted treefrog, Annandale's high altitude frog
- Kurixalus odontotarsus (Ye and Fei, 1993) – serrate-legged small treefrog
- Kurixalus verrucosus (Boulenger, 1893) – small rough-armed tree frog
- Kurixalus viridescens Nguyen, Matsui, and Duc, 2014
- Kurixalus wangi Wu, Huang, Tsai, Li, Jhang, and Wu, 2016
- Kurixalus yangi Yu, Hui, Rao, and Yang, 2018
