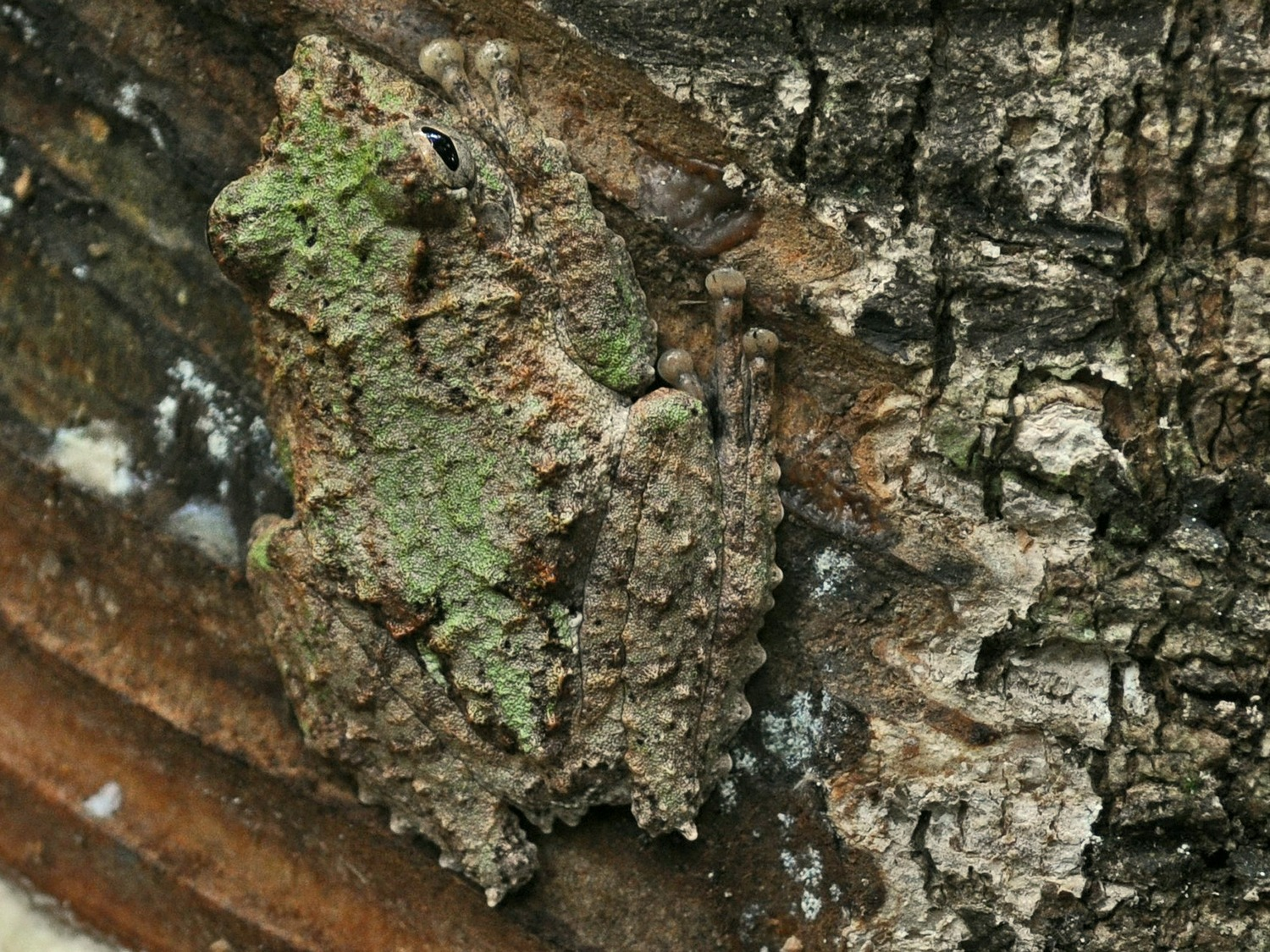

Conservation status
- Least Concern (IUCN 3.1)

Scientific classification
- Kingdom: Animalia
- Phylum: Chordata
- Class: Amphibia
- Order: Anura
- Family: Rhacophoridae
- Genus: Kurixalus
- Species: K. chaseni

Binomial name
- Kurixalus chaseni (Smith, 1924)

Synonyms
- Rhacophorus chaseni Smith, 1924; Rhacophorus appendiculatus chaseni Smith, 1924; Rhacophorus (Rhacophorus) chaseni Smith, 1924

= Kurixalus chaseni =

Species of frog

Kurixalus chaseni, the frilled tree frog or Malay frilled tree frog, is a species of frog in the family Rhacophoridae. It is endemic to Malaysia, Indonesia, and Thailand, where it has been observed between 0 and 500 meters above sea level.

This frog has been found in forests primary forest and long-growing secondary forest. This frog is known in swampy areas with water stagnant water. Scientists believe this frog can tolerate some level of habitat disturbance. It has been seen by roadsides.

Scientists classify this frog as at least concern of extinction because of its large range, which includes protected parks, and presumed large population. What threat it faces comes from habitat loss associated with deforestation associated with forest concession and palm oil cultivation

== Original description ==
- Matsui M; Kawahara Y; Eto K; Hamidy A; Ahmad N; Hossman MYB (2018). "Distinct species status of Kurixalus chaseni (Rhacophoridae, Anura) as revealed by mitochondrial phylogeny". Alytes. 36: 170–177.
