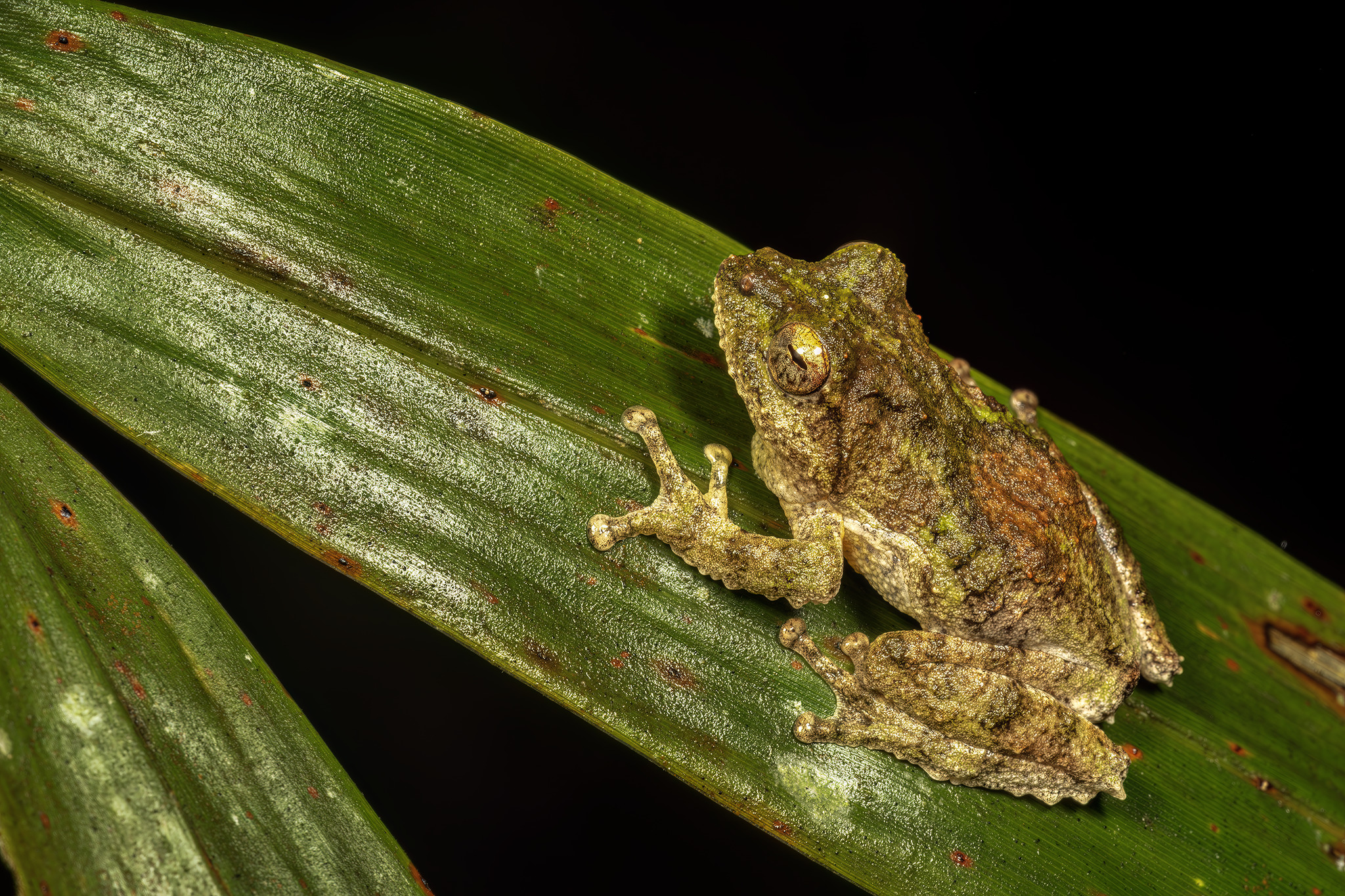

Conservation status
- Least Concern (IUCN 3.1)

Scientific classification
- Kingdom: Animalia
- Phylum: Chordata
- Class: Amphibia
- Order: Anura
- Family: Rhacophoridae
- Genus: Kurixalus
- Species: K. banaensis

Binomial name
- Kurixalus banaensis (Bourret, 1939)

Synonyms
- Philautus banaensis Bourret, 1939

= Kurixalus banaensis =

Species of amphibian

Kurixalus banaensis (Bana bubble-nest frog) is a species of frog in the family Rhacophoridae. It is endemic to Vietnam, where it has been observed between 109 and 1510 meters above sea level.

This frog is known from evergreen forests and has not been observed outside forest habitats. Scientists presume this frog breeds in stagnant water, like other frogs in Kurixalus.

Scientists classify this frog at least concern of its extinction because of its large range, which includes protected parks, such as Bach Ma National Park, Song Thanh Nature Reserve, and Bac Huong Hoa Nature Reserve. However, deforestation, particularly in favor of agriculture, does pose some threat.
