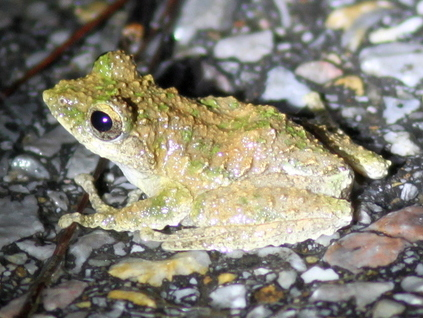

Conservation status
- Least Concern (IUCN 3.1)

Scientific classification
- Kingdom: Animalia
- Phylum: Chordata
- Class: Amphibia
- Order: Anura
- Family: Rhacophoridae
- Genus: Kurixalus
- Species: K. odontotarsus

Binomial name
- Kurixalus odontotarsus (Ye & Fei, 1993)

Synonyms
- Philautus odontotarsus Ye & Fei, 1993

= Kurixalus odontotarsus =

Species of amphibian

Kurixalus odontotarsus (serrate-legged small treefrog) is a species of frog in the family Rhacophoridae. It is found in southern China, Vietnam, Laos, and possibly Myanmar, where it has been observed between 250 and 1500 meters above sea level. Its natural habitats are subtropical or tropical moist lowland forests, subtropical or tropical moist montane forests, subtropical or tropical moist shrubland. The tadpoles swim in ditches and temporary pools. It is threatened by habitat loss through deforestation associated with small farms and logging.

Male Kurixalus odontotarsus grow to a snout–vent length of about 32 mm (1.3 in) and females about 43 mm (1.7 in).
