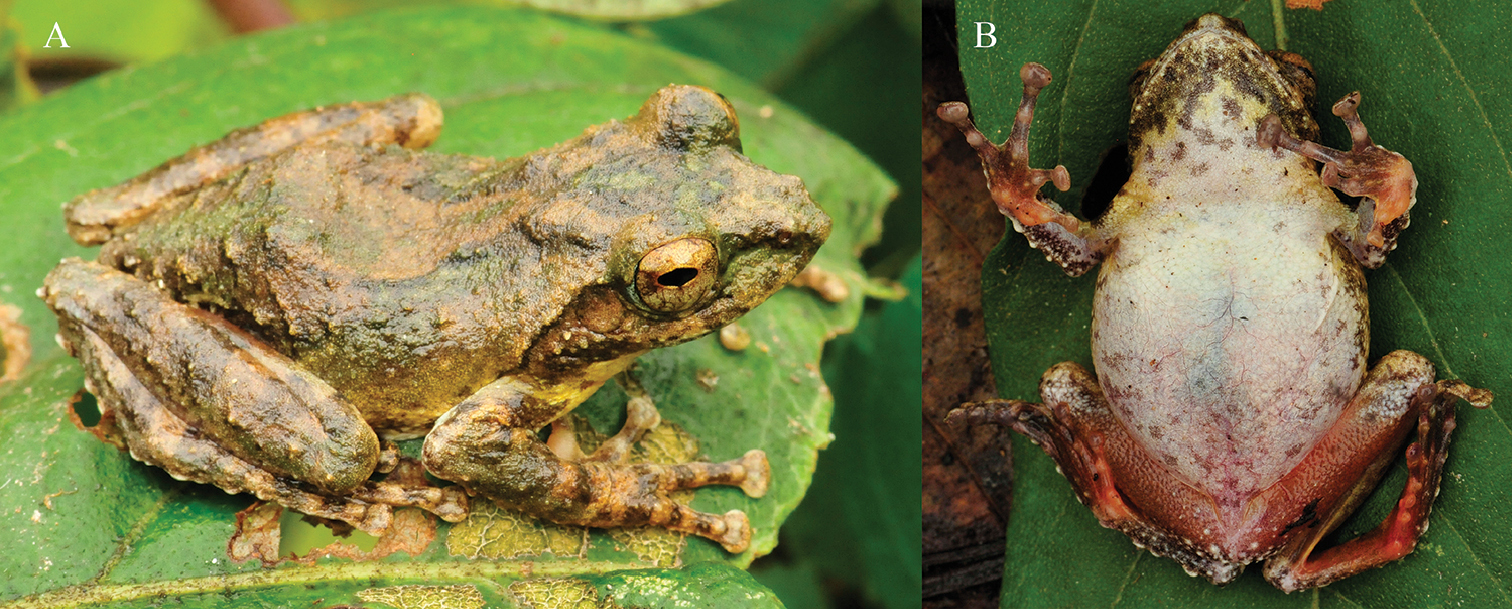

Conservation status
- Least Concern (IUCN 3.1)

Scientific classification
- Kingdom: Animalia
- Phylum: Chordata
- Class: Amphibia
- Order: Anura
- Family: Rhacophoridae
- Genus: Kurixalus
- Species: K. yangi

Binomial name
- Kurixalus yangi Yu, Hui, Rao, and Yang, 2018

= Kurixalus yangi =

Species of frog

Kurixalus yangi, or Yang's frill-limbed tree frog, is a species of frog in the family Rhacophoridae. It is endemic to India, Myanmar, and China's Yunnan Province.

The adult male frog measures 31.6–34.7 mm in snout-vent length. The skin of the dorsum is brown in color. There is yellow and green color on the flanks. There are spots on the upper abdomen. This frog has vomerine teeth, and the iris of the eye is gold in color.

This frog lives in evergreen forests between 354 and 1478 meters above sea level. The female frog lays eggs on leaves over water such that the tadpoles fall to the water below upon hatching.

Scientists classify this frog as at least concern of extinction because of its large range. However, it is under some threat from deforestation associated with farming and infrastructure.

Scientists named this frog for Professor Datong Yang of the Chinese Academy of Science for dedication to the country's herpetofauna.
