= Kurixalus viridescens =

Conservation status
- Endangered (IUCN 3.1)

Scientific classification
- Kingdom: Animalia
- Phylum: Chordata
- Class: Amphibia
- Order: Anura
- Family: Rhacophoridae
- Genus: Kurixalus
- Species: K. viridescens

Binomial name
- Kurixalus viridescens Nguyen, Matsui, and Duc, 2014

Species of frog

Kurixalus viridescens, the greenish frilled tree frog, is a species of frog in the family Rhacophoridae. It is endemic to Vietnam, where it has been observed in Hon Ba Nature Reserve and Bidoup Nui Ba National Park, about 1500 meters above sea level.

== Appearance ==
The adult female frog measures 28.7–36.6 mm in snout-vent length. The authors of the original description did not find any adult males. The skin of the dorsum is green in color without any of the brown or gray marks found on congeners. There is yellow coloration on the sides, legs, and feet, and the belly is lemon yellow in color. This frog has no vomerine teeth.

== Nomenclature ==
The frog's Latin name, viridescens, refers to its immaculate green color.

== Habitat and threats ==
This frog is found in evergreen forests close to the peaks of hills and mountains. Scientists have not observed eggs or tadpoles, but they presume it lays eggs in hollow trees containing water or in small pools.

Scientists classify this frog as endangered because of its small range, which is still subject to degradation from deforestation associated with agriculture. The government of Vietnam has taken some measures to preserve this animal.
