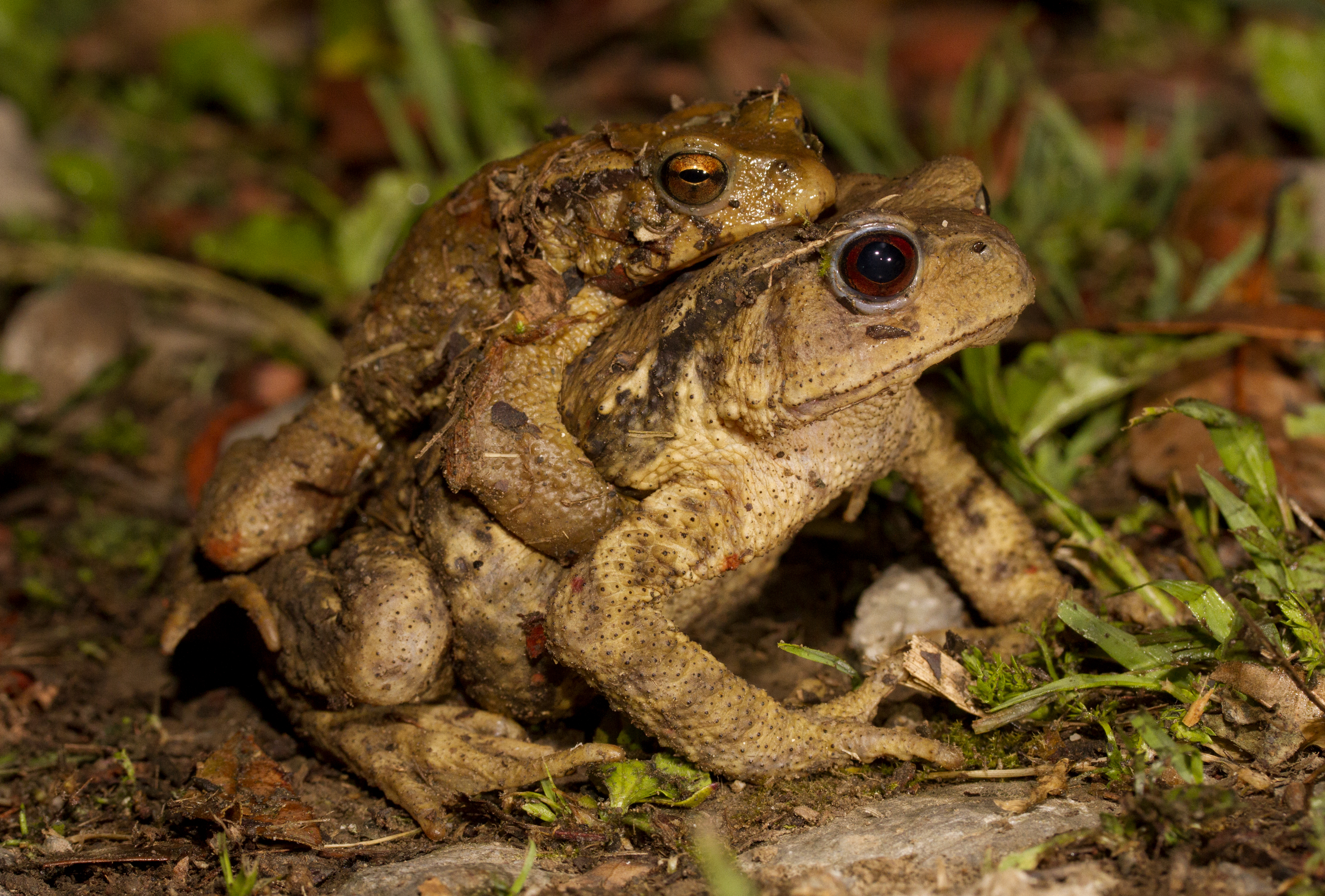

Conservation status
- Least Concern (IUCN 3.1)

Scientific classification
- Kingdom: Animalia
- Phylum: Chordata
- Class: Amphibia
- Order: Anura
- Family: Bufonidae
- Genus: Bufo
- Species: B. bankorensis

Binomial name
- Bufo bankorensis Barbour, 1908

= Bufo bankorensis =

Species of amphibian

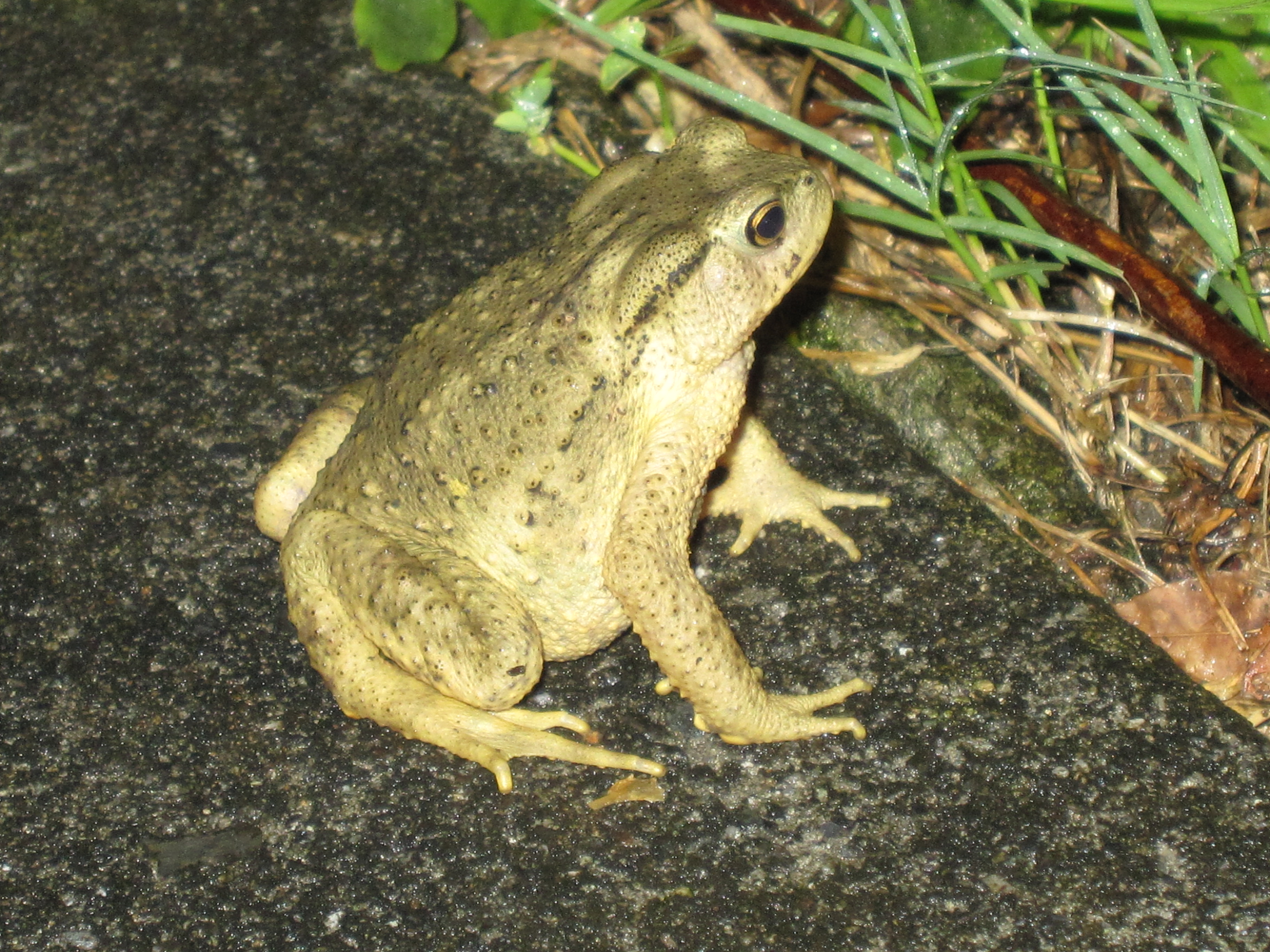

Bufo bankorensis (vernacular names: Central Formosa toad, Bankor toad) is a species of toad in the family Bufonidae. It is endemic to Taiwan and widely distributed at elevations up to 3,000 m (9,800 ft) above sea level. There have been doubts about its separatedness from Bufo gargarizans from China and even other species, but it is currently considered a valid species.

== Description ==
B. bankorensis is a large toad that can reach 15 cm (5.9 in), even 20 cm (7.9 in) in snout–vent length. Females are larger than males. The snout is short. Dorsolateral ridge is absent. The tympanum is not prominent. The parotoid glands are kidney-shaped. Skin is rough and covered with pointed tubercles of various size. Coloration is light brown color with orange, yellow, or black markings.

== Habitat and conservation ==
B. bankorensis are found in a range of habitats at elevations up to 3,000 m (9,800 ft): broadleaf forests, cultivated fields, mixed forests, and orchards. They can be seen foraging on insects during rainy nights. Breeding can take place in both streams and pools. One study found that a temperate population could breed throughout the year, while a subtropical population only bred during the cooler part of year, from September to March.

While B. bankorensis is a common species, habitat loss remains a threat to it. It is also collected for food and traditional medicine.
