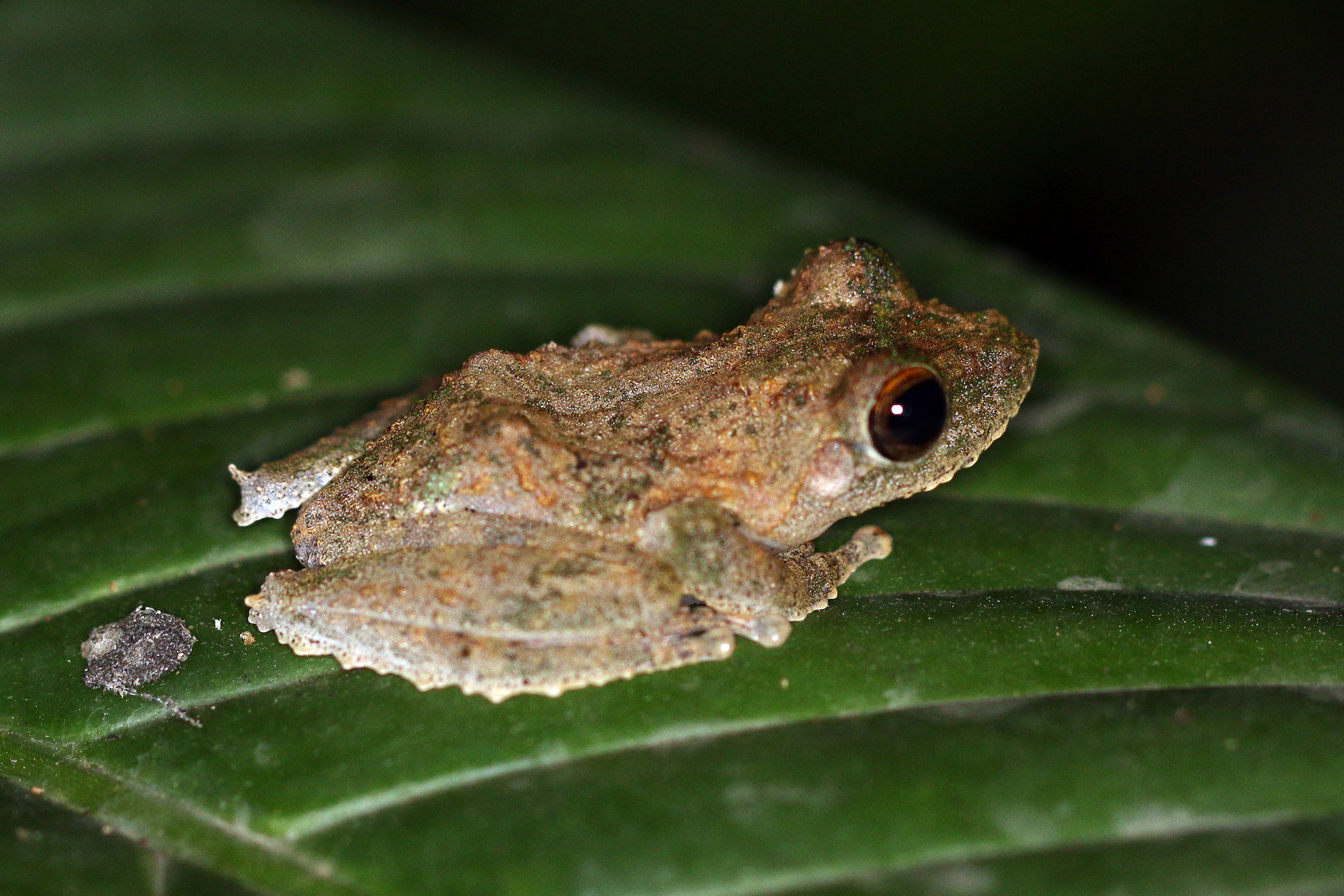
- In Danum Valley Conservation Area, Sabah, Borneo, Malaysia

Conservation status
- Least Concern (IUCN 3.1)

Scientific classification
- Kingdom: Animalia
- Phylum: Chordata
- Class: Amphibia
- Order: Anura
- Family: Rhacophoridae
- Genus: Kurixalus
- Species: K. appendiculatus

Binomial name
- Kurixalus appendiculatus (Günther, 1858)

Synonyms
- Polypedates appendiculatus Günther, 1858; Rhacophorus appendiculatus (Günther, 1858)

= Frilled tree frog =

Species of amphibian

The frilled tree frog, rough-armed tree frog, or Southeast Asian tree frog (Kurixalus appendiculatus) is a species of frog in the family Rhacophoridae found in Brunei, Cambodia, India, Indonesia, Malaysia, Myanmar, the Philippines, Thailand, and Vietnam between 0 and 500 meters above sea level.

The frog has been found in primary and secondary forest habitats in swamps and near slow-flowing streams. Observers have seen them perched on shrubs. The tadpoles swim in stagnant water. These frogs are territorial and feed mostly on invertebrates.

Scientists classify this frog as being at least concern of extinction because of its large range. However, that range is subject to deforestation associated with palm oil cultivation.

== Gallery ==
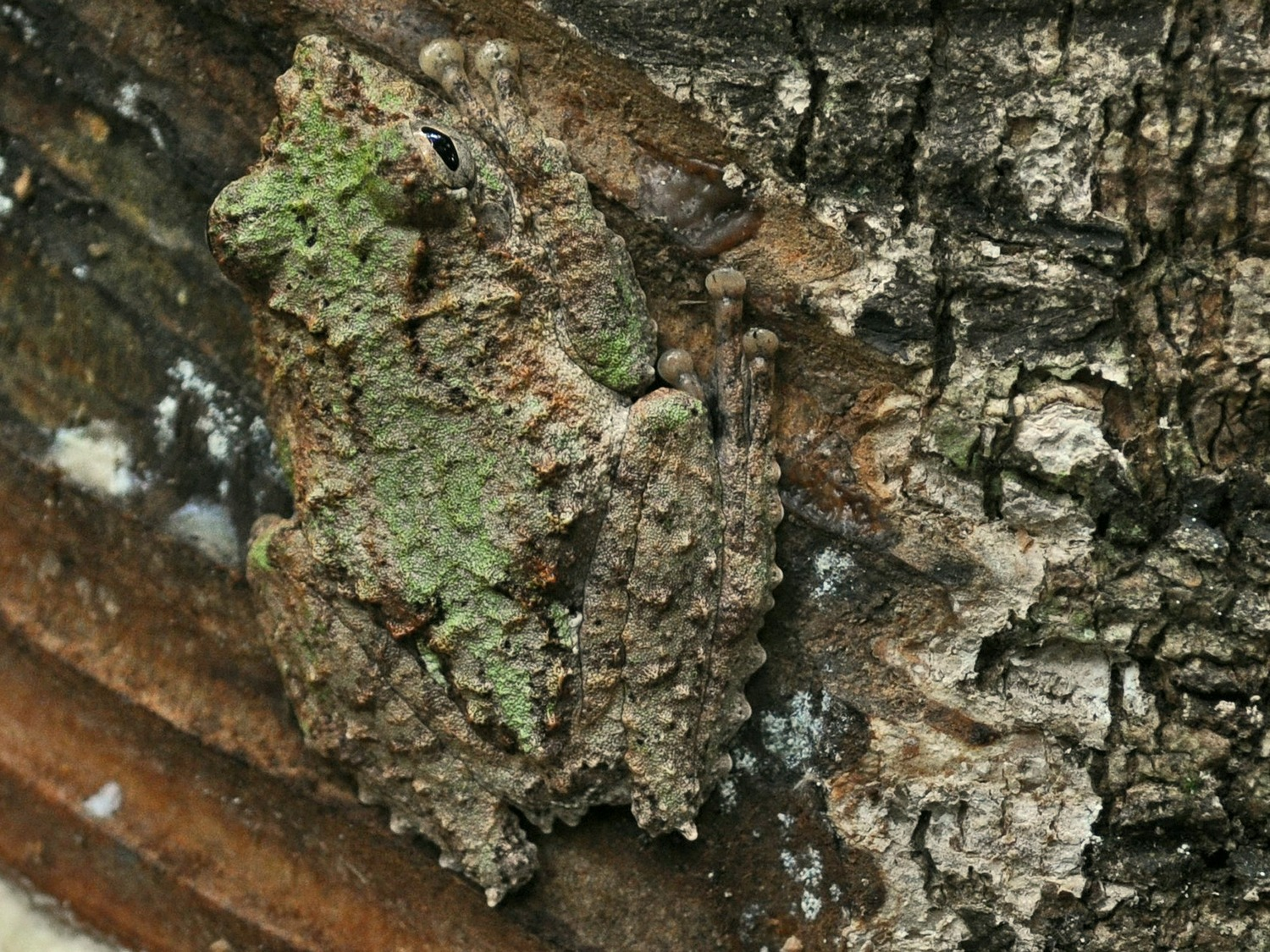
From Sambas, West Kalimantan

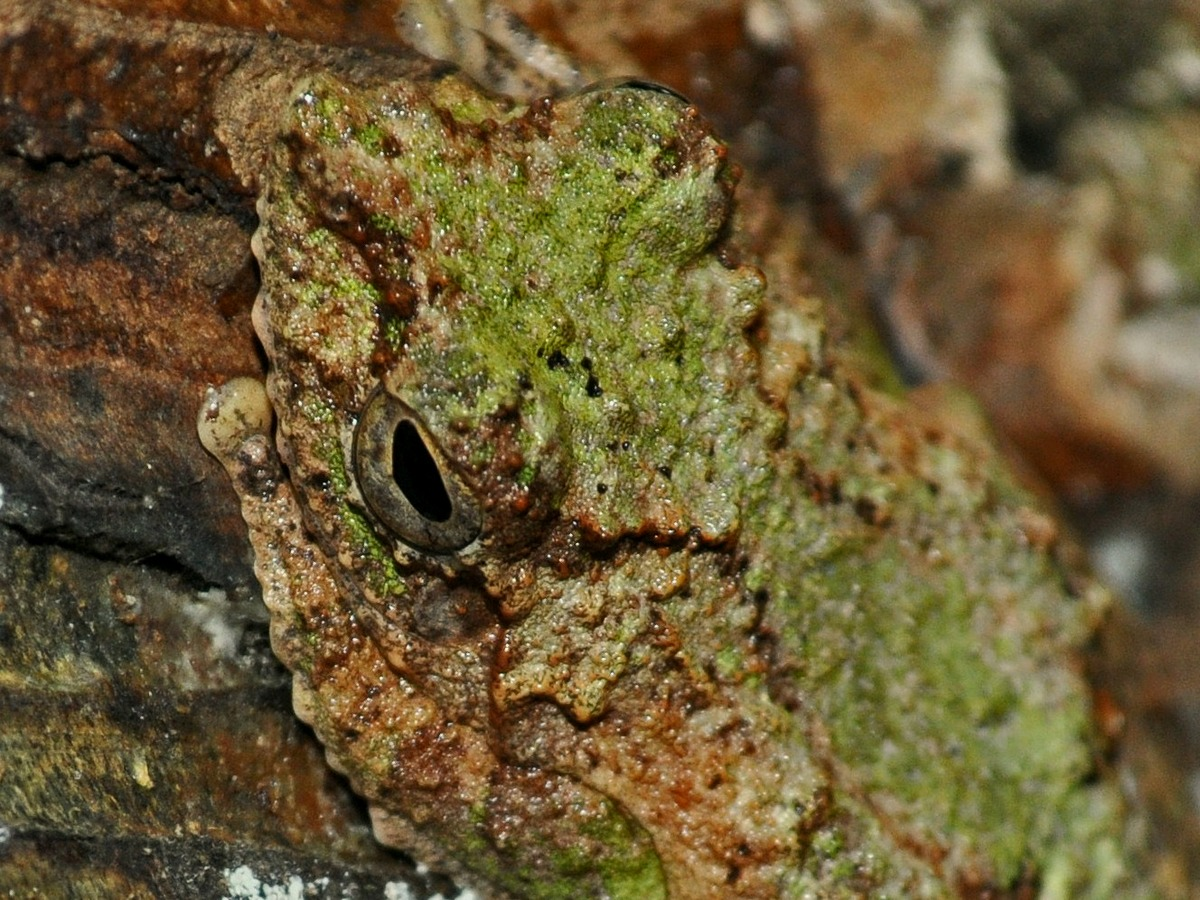
Head close up

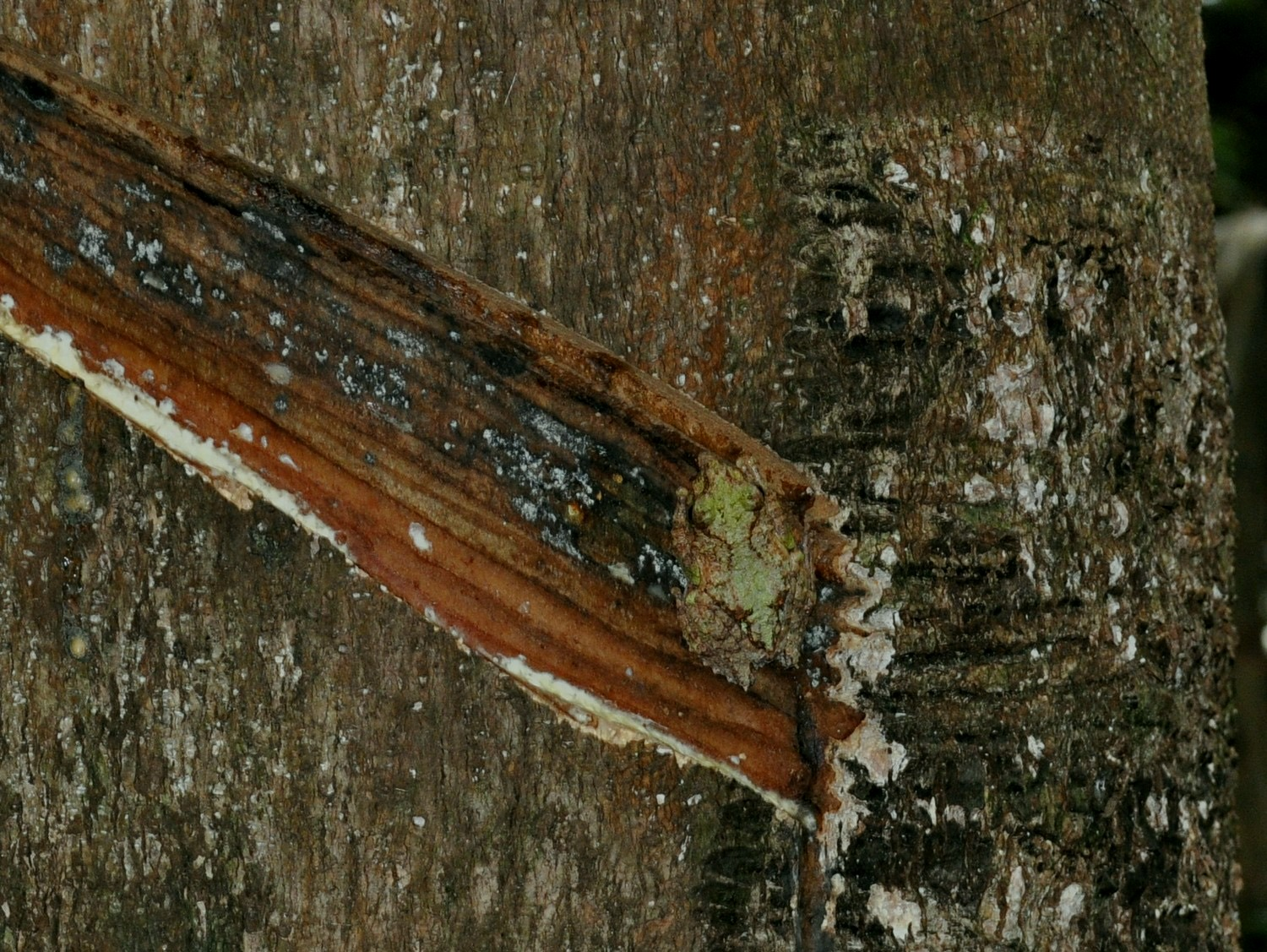
Mimicking Hevea tree bark
