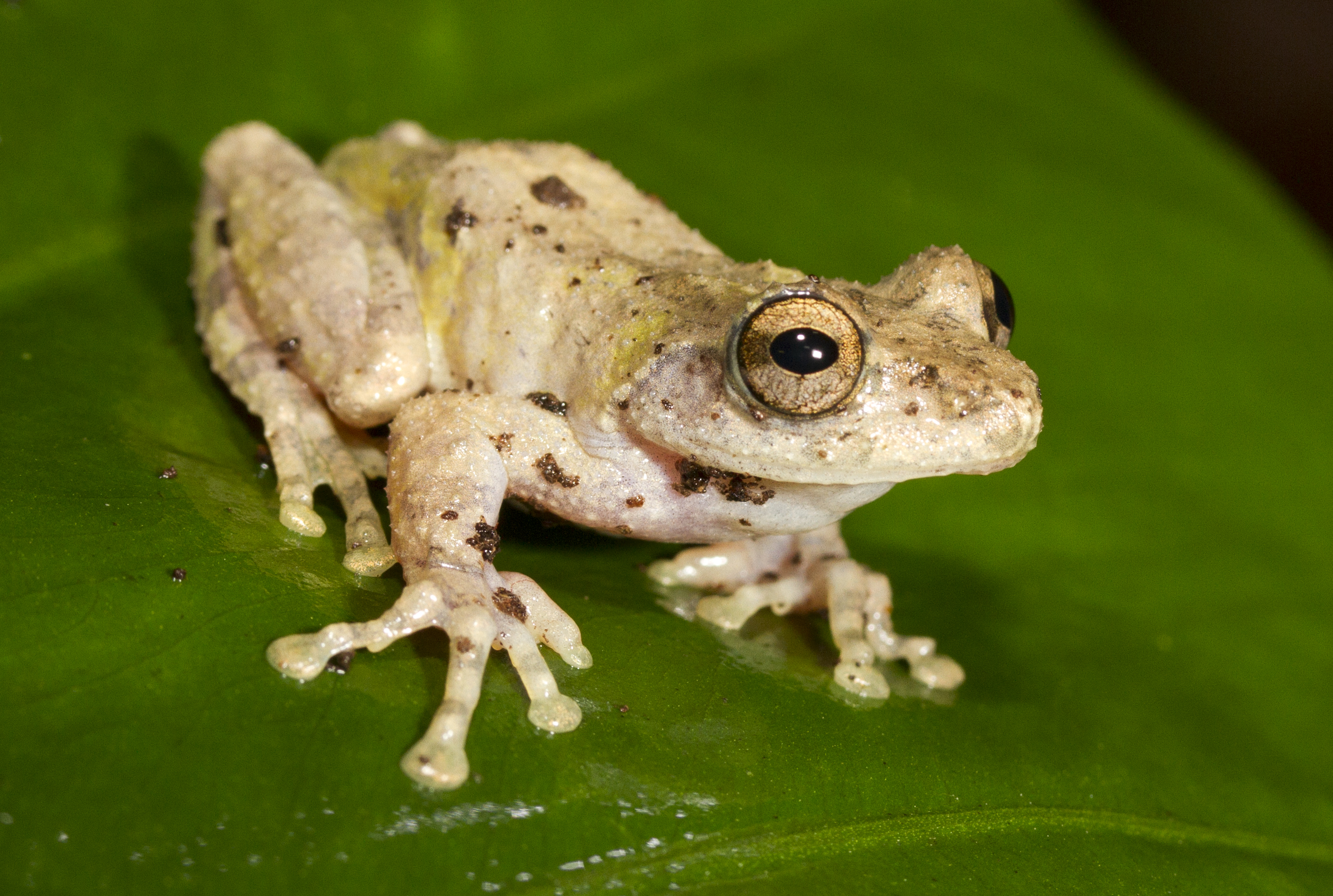

Conservation status
- Least Concern (IUCN 3.1)

Scientific classification
- Kingdom: Animalia
- Phylum: Chordata
- Class: Amphibia
- Order: Anura
- Family: Rhacophoridae
- Genus: Kurixalus
- Species: K. eiffingeri

Binomial name
- Kurixalus eiffingeri (Boettger, 1895)

Synonyms
- Buergeria pollicaris (Werner, 1914); Chirixalus eiffingeri

= Kurixalus eiffingeri =

Species of frog

Kurixalus eiffingeri, commonly known as Eiffinger's tree frog, is a species of frog in the family Rhacophoridae. It is found in Taiwan and on the Yaeyama Islands of Japan. Its natural habitats are broadleaf forests, bamboo forests, and mixed bamboo forests between 50 and 2000 meters above sea level. It is threatened by habitat loss.

Kurixalus eiffingeri is a small to medium-sized frog with rough skin and a robust body. The adult male frog measures 31–35 mm in snout-vent length and the adult female frog 36–40 mm They breed in tree holes and bamboo stumps. Some male frogs have been observed guarding the eggs before hatching. Tadpoles are oophagous, and female frogs lay trophic eggs to feed their young. Tadpoles of this species have been reported to avoid defecation until after metamorphosis.
