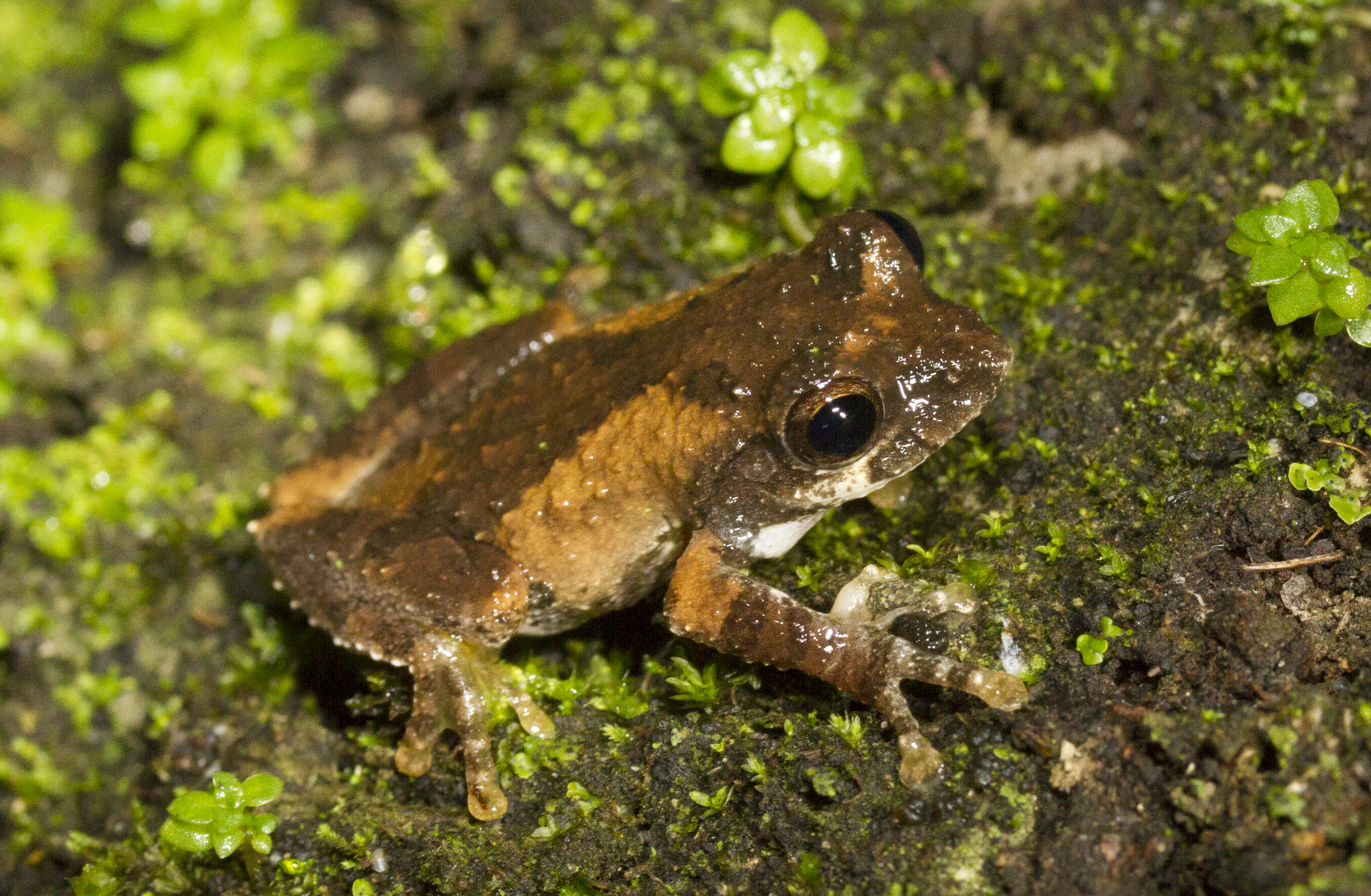

Conservation status
- Least Concern (IUCN 3.1)

Scientific classification
- Kingdom: Animalia
- Phylum: Chordata
- Class: Amphibia
- Order: Anura
- Family: Rhacophoridae
- Genus: Kurixalus
- Species: K. idiootocus

Binomial name
- Kurixalus idiootocus (Kuramoto & Wang, 1987)

Synonyms
- Chirixalus idiootocus; Philautus idiootocus

= Kurixalus idiootocus =

Species of amphibian

Kurixalus idiootocus is a small species of frog in the family Rhacophoridae. It is endemic to Taiwan and is commonly known as the temple tree frog. Its natural habitats are subtropical or tropical moist shrubland, seasonally wet or flooded lowland grassland, freshwater marshes, intermittent freshwater marshes and irrigated land. It is listed as being of "Least Concern" by the IUCN although there may be some destruction of its habitat.

== Description ==
Kurixalus idiootocus is a small tree frog measuring 24 to 43 millimetres (0.94 to 1.69 in) in length with the females usually being larger than the males. The head is broad with a triangular, pointed snout. This frog is some shade of pale or medium brown with a dark-coloured stripe running along the spine. The sides of the head and body are marbled with dark brown patches and spots and there is often a large, deep brown hourglass-shaped pattern on the central back. The upper side of the head bears tubercles and the skin is granulated. There are flattened discs on the fingers and toes, and some webbing, especially on the hind feet.

== Distribution and habitat ==
Kurixalus idiootocus is widespread in Taiwan at altitudes of up to 750 metres (2,460 ft) above sea level. It is typically found near still sheets of water, in paddy fields, damp grassland or shrubby areas.

== Life cycle ==
The breeding season of Kurixalus idiootocus lasts from March to June. Male frogs aggregate in suitable locations and call from the ground or low shrubs and are aggressive with one another. The advertisement call consists of a series of bird-like trills lasting several seconds, repeated periodically. Unusually, the egg masses containing about 180 eggs are deposited on land in close proximity to water; in reference to this, the specific epithet is derived from the Ancient Greek "idios," or "peculiar", and "ootocos," or "egg-laying", according to the describers Kuramoto and Wang. The eggs have two jelly-like coatings, the outer one being tough and non-sticky. They are laid in depressions in the ground, under stones, in crevices or holes and are sometimes covered with dead leaves. Hatching does not take place until heavy rainfall occurs and the depression fills up or the tadpoles get washed into the nearby ditch, pond or temporary pool. The tadpoles are dark brown, sometimes with black spots, and are herbivorous.

== Status ==
In its Red List of Threatened Species, the IUCN lists Kurixalus idiootocus as being of "Least Concern". This is because it is a common species with a relatively large range and its population seems to be stable. There is probably some destruction of its habitat by humans but it is present in a number of protected areas where it should be free from disturbance.
