= List of amphibians of Japan =

This list of amphibians recorded in Japan is primarily based on the IUCN Red List, which details the conservation status of some ninety-four species. Of these, four are assessed as critically endangered (the endemic Amakusa salamander, Mikawa salamander, Tosashimizu salamander, and Tsukuba clawed salamander), twenty-seven as endangered, fourteen as vulnerable, eleven as near threatened, and thirty-eight as of least concern.

According to statistics accompanying the 2020 Japanese Ministry of the Environment (MoE) Red List, ninety-one species and subspecies are to be found, but the conservation status of only sixty-seven is detailed. Of these, five taxa are critically endangered from a national perspective, twenty are endangered, twenty-two vulnerable, nineteen near threatened, and one data deficient.

As of January 2023, for their protection, forty-one species have been designated National Endangered Species by Cabinet Order in accordance with the 1992 Act on Conservation of Endangered Species of Wild Fauna and Flora.

== Order: Anura (frogs) ==
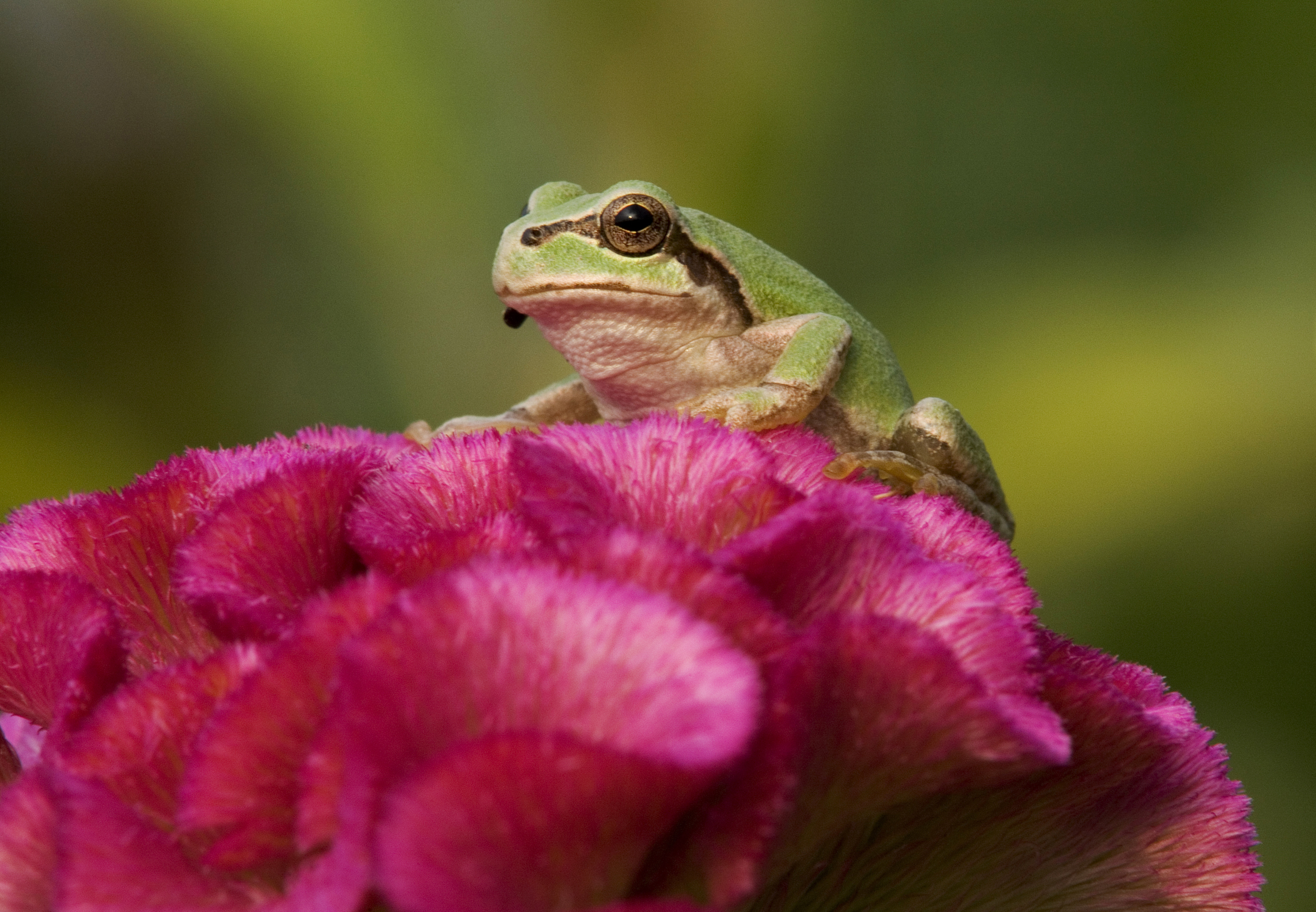
Japanese tree frog, Dryophytes japonicus

Holst's frog, Babina holsti

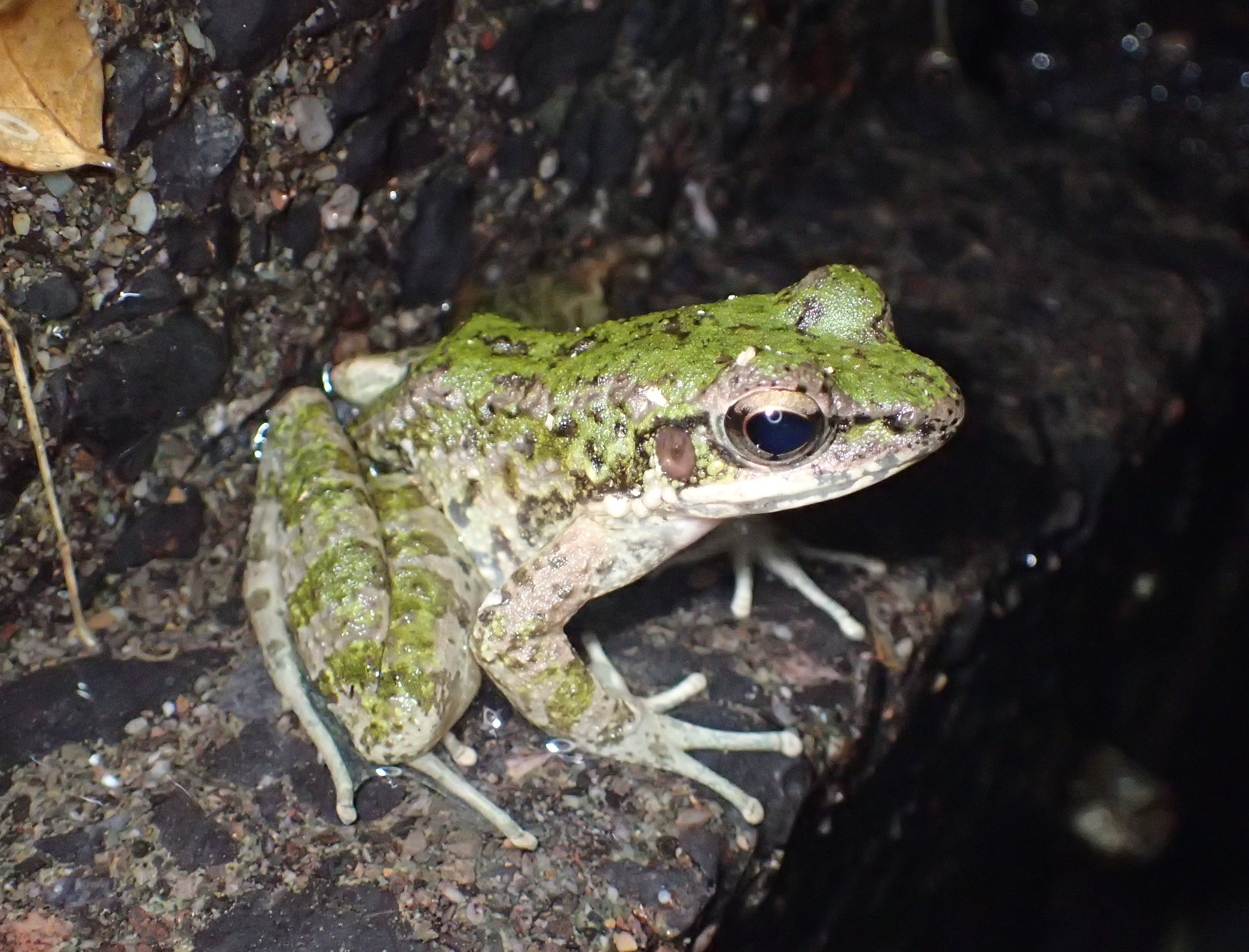
Amami tip-nosed frog, Odorrana amamiensis

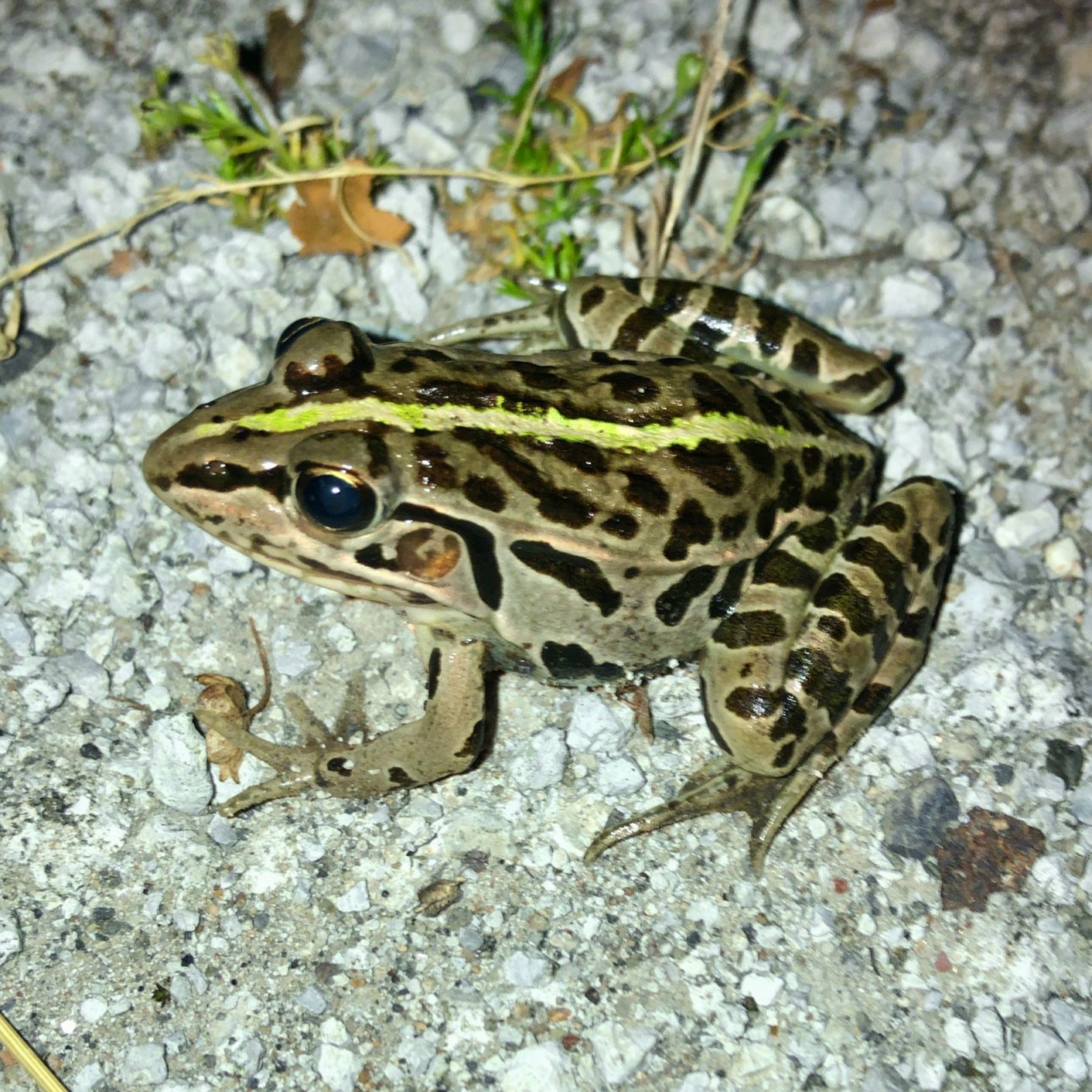
Daruma pond frog, Pelophylax porosus

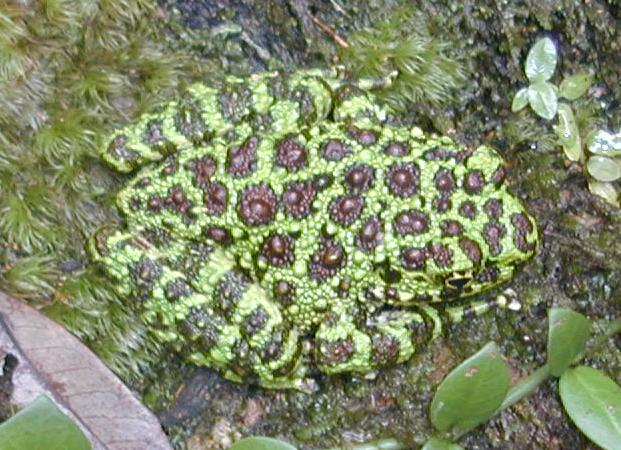
Ishikawa's frog, Rana ishikawae

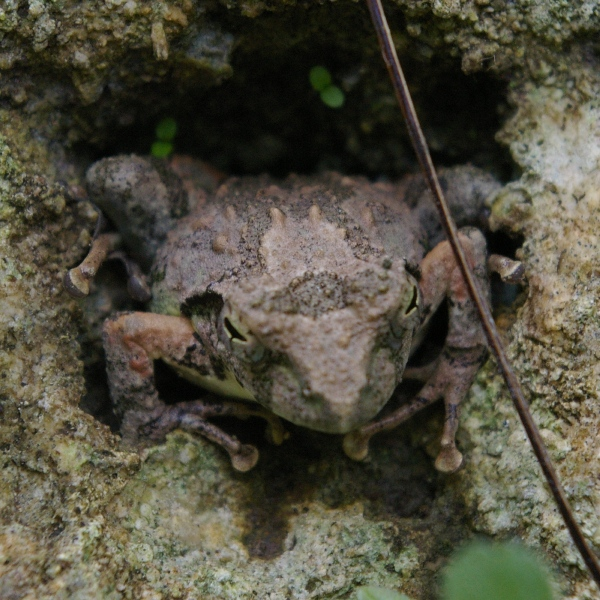
Ryukyu kajika frog, Buergeria japonica

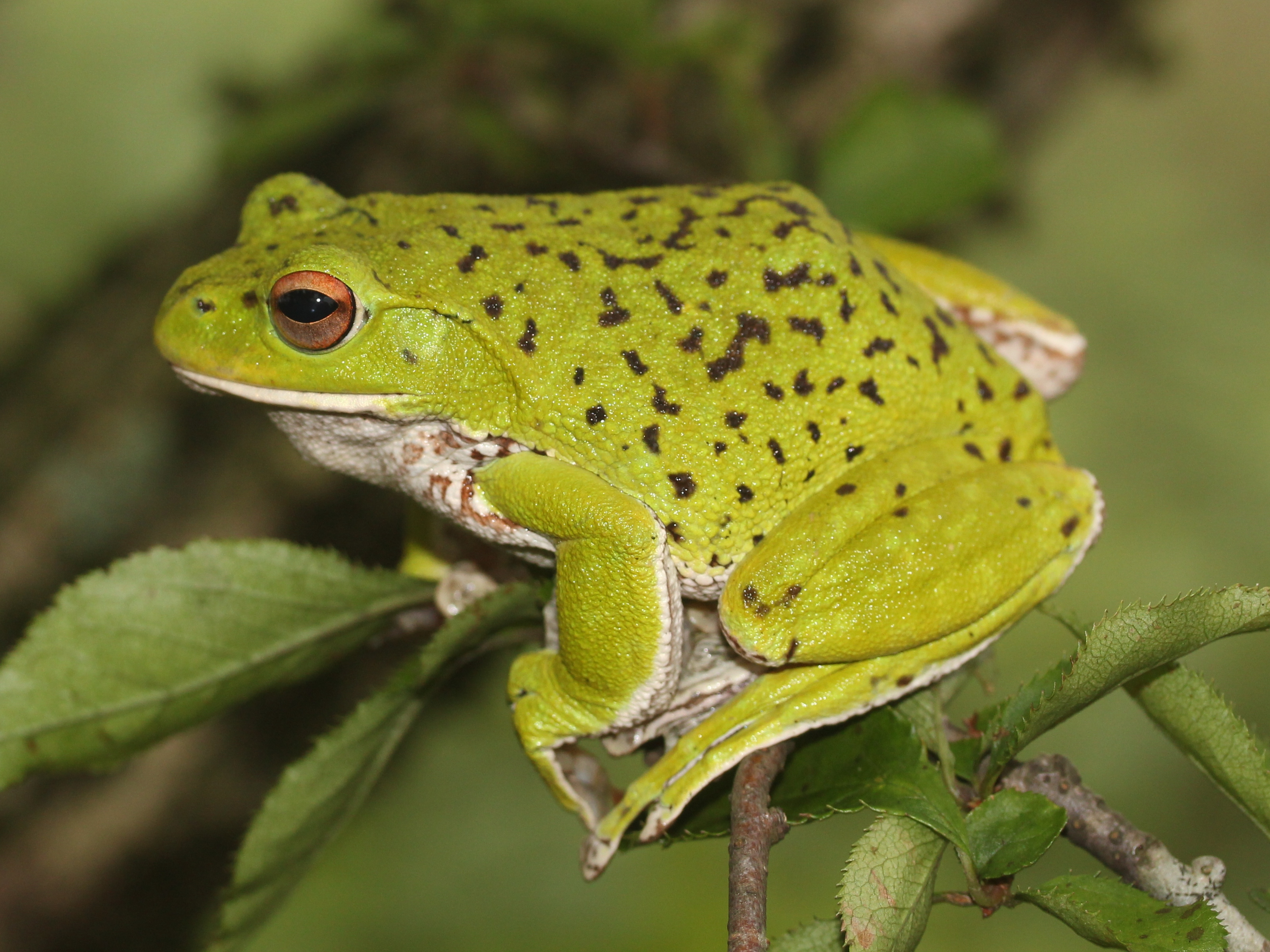
Forest green tree frog, Zhangixalus arboreus

- Family: Bufonidae
  - Genus: Bufo
    - Asiatic toad, Bufo gargarizans LC^{IUCN}
      - Miyako toad, B. g. miyakonis (endemic subspecies) (MoE: NT)
    - Japanese common toad, Bufo japonicus LC^{IUCN} (endemic)
      - B. j. japonicus
      - B. j. formosus
    - Japanese stream toad, Bufo torrenticola LC^{IUCN} (endemic)
  - Genus: Rhinella
    - Cane toad, Rhinella marina LC^{IUCN} (introduced)
- Family: Dicroglossidae
  - Genus: Fejervarya
    - Indian rice frog, Fejervarya limnocharis LC^{IUCN}
    - Marsh frog, Fejervarya kawamurai LC^{IUCN}
    - Sakishima rice frog, Fejervarya sakishimensis LC^{IUCN}
  - Genus: Limnonectes
    - Namie's frog, Limnonectes namiyei EN^{IUCN} (endemic)
- Family: Hylidae
  - Genus: Dryophytes
    - Japanese tree frog, Dryophytes japonicus LC^{IUCN}
  - Genus: Hyla
    - Hallowell's tree frog, Hyla hallowellii LC^{IUCN} (endemic)
- Family: Microhylidae
  - Genus: Microhyla
    - Okinawa narrow-mouthed toad, Microhyla okinavensis LC^{IUCN} (endemic)
    - Yaeyama narrow-mouthed toad, Microhyla kuramotoi LC^{IUCN} (endemic)
- Family: Pipidae
  - Genus: Xenopus
    - African clawed frog, Xenopus laevis LC^{IUCN} (introduced)
- Family: Ranidae
  - Genus: Babina
    - Holst's frog, Babina holsti EN^{IUCN} (endemic)
    - Otton frog, Babina subaspera EN^{IUCN} (endemic)
  - Genus: Glandirana
    - Japanese wrinkled frog, Glandirana rugosa LC^{IUCN} (endemic)
    - Proto wrinkled frog, Glandirana reliqua (endemic)
    - Sado wrinkled frog, Glandirana susurra EN^{IUCN} (endemic)
  - Genus: Lithobates
    - American bullfrog, Lithobates catesbeianus LC^{IUCN} (introduced)
  - Genus: Nidirana
    - Yaeyama harpist frog, Nidirana okinavana EN^{IUCN} |(endemic)
  - Genus: Odorrana
    - Amami Ōshima frog, Odorrana splendida EN^{IUCN} (endemic)
    - Amami tip-nosed frog, Odorrana amamiensis EN^{IUCN} (endemic)
    - Greater tip-nosed frog, Odorrana supranarina EN^{IUCN} (endemic)
    - Ishikawa's frog, Odorrana ishikawae EN^{IUCN} (endemic)
    - Ryukyu tip-nosed frog, Odorrana narina EN^{IUCN} (endemic)
    - Utsunomiya's tip-nosed frog, Odorrana utsunomiyaorum EN^{IUCN} (endemic)
  - Genus: Pelophylax
    - Black-spotted pond frog, Pelophylax nigromaculatus LC^{IUCN}
    - Daruma pond frog, Pelophylax porosus LC^{IUCN}
      - Nagoya Daruma pond frog, P. p. brevipodus (endemic subspecies) (MoE: EN)
      - Tokyo Daruma pond frog, P. p. porosus (endemic subspecies) (MoE: NT)
  - Genus: Rana
    - Dwarf Tago's brown frog, Rana kyoto (endemic)
    - Dybowski's frog, Rana dybowskii LC^{IUCN}
    - Goto Tago's brown frog, Rana matsuoi (endemic)
    - Ezo brown frog, Rana pirica LC^{IUCN}
    - Japanese brown frog, Rana japonica LC^{IUCN} (endemic)
    - Montane brown frog, Rana ornativentris LC^{IUCN} (endemic)
    - Neba Tago's brown frog, Rana neba LC^{IUCN} (endemic)
    - Oki Tago's brown frog, Rana okiensis (MoE: NT, as R. tagoi okiensis) (endemic)
    - Okinawa frog, Rana ulma VU^{IUCN} (endemic)
    - Ryukyu brown frog, Rana kobai NT^{IUCN} (endemic)
    - Stream brown frog, Rana sakuraii LC^{IUCN} (endemic)
    - Tago's brown frog, Rana tagoi LC^{IUCN} (endemic)
    - Tsushima brown frog, Rana tsushimensis NT^{IUCN} (endemic)
    - Yakushima brown frog, Rana yakushimensis (MoE: NT, as R. tagoi yakushimensis) (endemic)
- Family: Rhacophoridae
  - Genus: Buergeria
    - Kajika frog, Buergeria buergeri LC^{IUCN} (endemic)
    - Ryukyu kajika frog, Buergeria japonica LC^{IUCN} (endemic)
    - Yaeyama kajika frog, Buergeria choui LC^{IUCN}
  - Genus: Polypedates
    - Common tree frog, Polypedates leucomystax LC^{IUCN} (introduced)
  - Genus: Kurixalus
    - Eiffinger's tree frog, Kurixalus eiffingeri LC^{IUCN}
  - Genus: Zhangixalus
    - Amami green tree frog, Zhangixalus amamiensis LC^{IUCN} (endemic)
    - Forest green tree frog, Zhangixalus arboreus LC^{IUCN} (endemic)
    - Okinawa green tree frog, Zhangixalus viridis LC^{IUCN} (endemic)
    - Owston's green tree frog, Zhangixalus owstoni NT^{IUCN} (endemic)
    - Schlegel's green tree frog, Zhangixalus schlegelii LC^{IUCN} (endemic)

== Order: Caudata (salamanders) ==
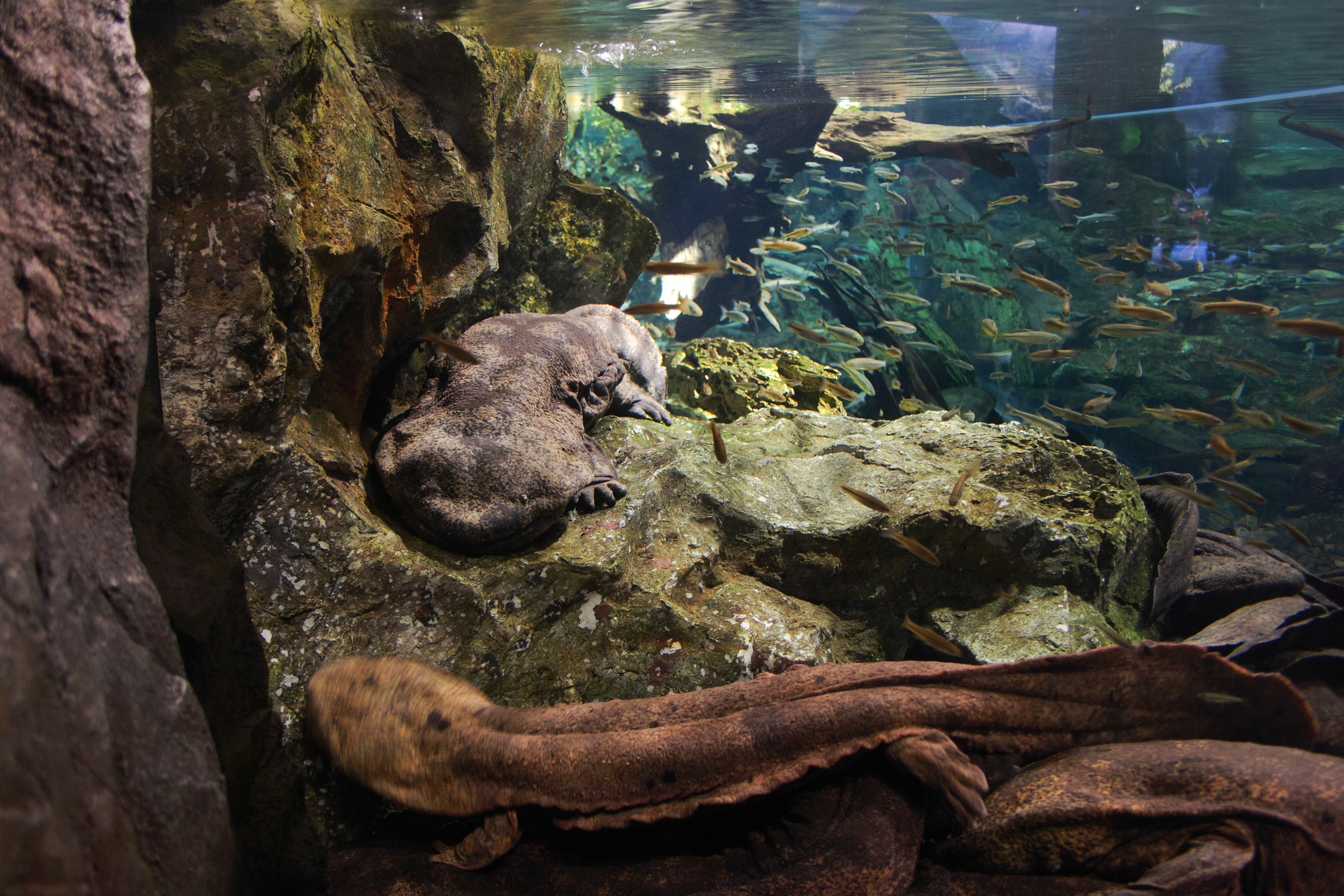
Japanese giant salamander, Andrias japonicus

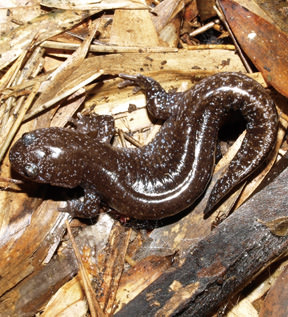
Abe's salamander, Hynobius abei

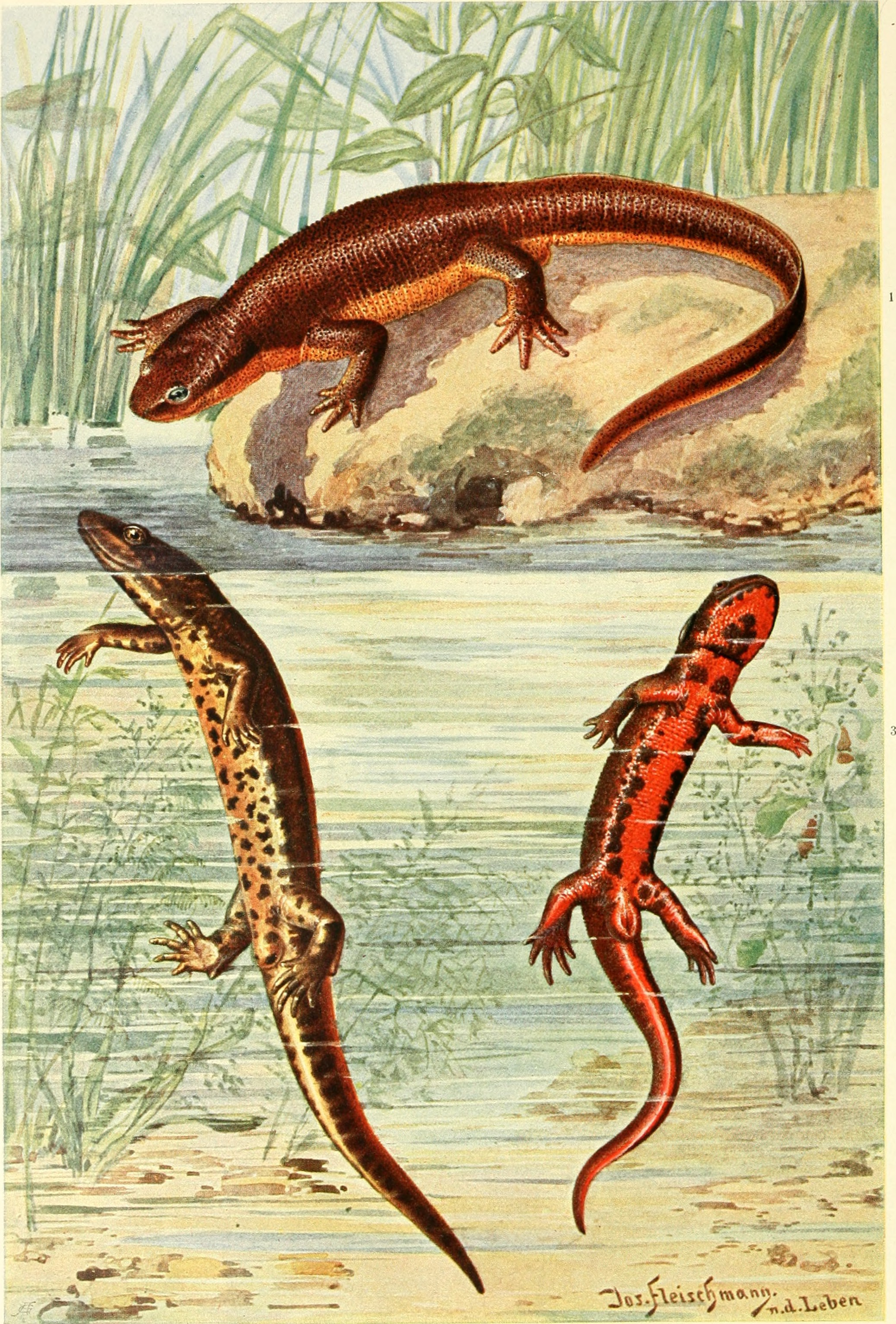
Japanese fire belly newt, Cynops pyrrhogaster

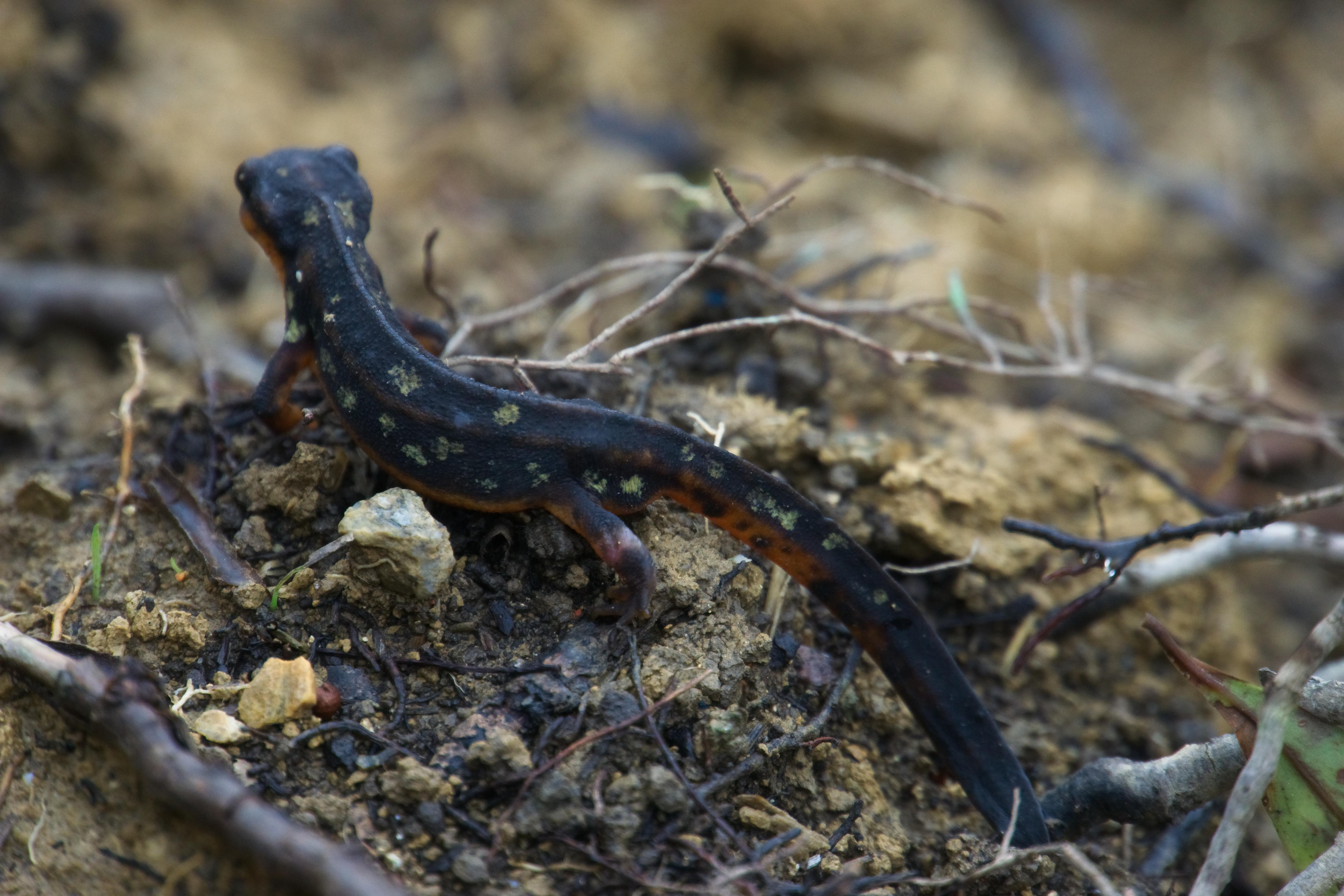
Sword-tail newt, Cynops ensicauda

- Family: Cryptobranchidae
  - Genus: Andrias
    - Chinese giant salamander Andrias davidianus CR^{IUCN} (introduced)
    - Japanese giant salamander, Andrias japonicus VU^{IUCN} (endemic)
- Family: Hynobiidae
  - Genus: Hynobius
    - Abe's salamander, Hynobius abei EN^{IUCN} (endemic) (MoE: CR)
    - Abu salamander, Hynobius abuensis EN^{IUCN} (endemic)
    - Aki salamander, Hynobius akiensis EN^{IUCN} (endemic)
    - Amakusa salamander, Hynobius amakusaensis CR^{IUCN} (endemic) (MoE: CR)
    - Chikushi-buchi salamander, Hynobius oyamai VU^{IUCN} (endemic)
    - Chūgoku-buchi salamander, Hynobius sematonotos VU^{IUCN} (endemic)
    - Ezo salamander, Hynobius retardatus LC^{IUCN} (endemic) (MoE: DD)
    - Geiyo salamander, Hynobius geiyoensis (endemic)
    - Blotched salamander, Hynobius naevius EN^{IUCN} (endemic)
    - Hakuba salamander, Hynobius hidamontanus EN^{IUCN} (endemic)
    - Hida salamander, Hynobius kimurae LC^{IUCN} (endemic)
    - Highland salamander, Hynobius utsunomiyaorum VU^{IUCN} (endemic)
    - Hokuriku salamander, Hynobius takedai EN^{IUCN} (endemic)
    - Hynobius oni (endemic)
    - Hynobius tagoi (endemic)
    - Ishizuchi salamander, Hynobius hirosei NT^{IUCN} (endemic)
    - Iwaki salamander, Hynobius sengokui (endemic)
    - Iwami salamander, Hynobius iwami EN^{IUCN} (endemic)
    - Iyoshima salamander, Hynobius kuishiensis VU^{IUCN} (endemic)
    - Izumo salamander, Hynobius kunibiki (endemic)
    - Japanese black salamander, Hynobius nigrescens LC^{IUCN} (endemic)
    - Japanese rift salamander, Hynobius fossigenus VU^{IUCN} (endemic)
    - Kato's salamander, Hynobius katoi EN^{IUCN} (endemic)
    - Mahoroba salamander, Hynobius guttatus NT^{IUCN} (endemic)
    - Mikawa salamander, Hynobius mikawaensis CR^{IUCN} (endemic) (MoE: CR)
    - Mitsjama salamander, Hynobius nebulosus LC^{IUCN} (endemic)
    - Ōdaigahara salamander, Hynobius boulengeri EN^{IUCN} (endemic)
    - Ōita salamander, Hynobius dunni VU^{IUCN} (endemic)
    - Oki salamander, Hynobius okiensis EN^{IUCN} (endemic)
    - Ōsumi salamander, Hynobius osumiensis EN^{IUCN} (endemic)
    - San'in salamander, Hynobius setoi EN^{IUCN} (endemic)
    - Setouchi salamander, Hynobius setouchi NT^{IUCN} (endemic)
    - Smaller blotched salamander, Hynobius stejnegeri NT^{IUCN} (endemic)
    - Sobo salamander, Hynobius shinichisatoi EN^{IUCN} (endemic)
    - Stejneger's oriental salamander, Hynobius ikioi VU^{IUCN} (endemic)
    - Sumida salamander, Hynobius sumidai (endemic)
    - Tōhoku salamander, Hynobius lichenatus LC^{IUCN} (endemic)
    - Tokyo salamander, Hynobius tokyoensis VU^{IUCN} (endemic)
    - Tosashimizu salamander, Hynobius tosashimizuensis CR^{IUCN} (endemic) (MoE: CR)
    - Tsurugi salamander, Hynobius tsurugiensis EN^{IUCN} (endemic)
    - Tsushima salamander, Hynobius tsuensis NT^{IUCN} (endemic)
    - Yamaguchi salamander, Hynobius bakan EN^{IUCN} (endemic)
    - Yamato salamander, Hynobius vandenburghi VU^{IUCN} (endemic)
  - Genus: Onychodactylus
    - Bandai clawed salamander, Onychodactylus intermedius NT^{IUCN} (endemic)
    - Fireback clawed salamander, Onychodactylus pyrrhonotus (endemic)
    - Japanese clawed salamander, Onychodactylus japonicus LC^{IUCN} (endemic)
    - Shikoku clawed salamander, Onychodactylus kinneburi VU^{IUCN} (endemic)
    - Tadami clawed salamander, Onychodactylus fuscus EN^{IUCN} (endemic)
    - Tōhoku clawed salamander, Onychodactylus nipponoborealis LC^{IUCN} (endemic)
    - Tsukuba clawed salamander, Onychodactylus tsukubaensis CR^{IUCN} (endemic) (MoE: CR)
  - Genus: Salamandrella
    - Siberian salamander, Salamandrella keyserlingii LC^{IUCN}
- Family: Salamandridae
  - Genus: Cynops
    - Japanese fire belly newt, Cynops pyrrhogaster NT^{IUCN} (endemic)
    - Sword-tail newt, Cynops ensicauda VU^{IUCN} (endemic)
      - C. e. ensicauda
      - C. e. popei
  - Genus: Echinotriton
    - Anderson's crocodile newt, Echinotriton andersoni VU^{IUCN} (endemic)
    - Raffaelli's spiny crocodile newt, Echinotriton raffaellii (endemic)

== Japanese names ==
The Japanese names for the taxa found in Japan have been collated and published by the Herpetological Society of Japan.

== See also ==
- List of animals in Japan
- Wildlife Protection Areas in Japan
