= Onychodactylus tsukubaensis =

Conservation status
- Critically Endangered (IUCN 3.1)

Scientific classification
- Kingdom: Animalia
- Phylum: Chordata
- Class: Amphibia
- Order: Urodela
- Family: Hynobiidae
- Genus: Onychodactylus
- Species: O. tsukubaensis

Binomial name
- Onychodactylus tsukubaensis Yoshikawa and Matsui, 2013

Species of salamander

Onychodactylus tsukubaensis, commonly known as Tsukuba clawed salamander, is a species of salamander endemic to Japan and belongs to the Hynobiidae family. This species of salamander is currently considered to be critically endangered.

== Description ==
The Tsukuba clawed salamander can be identified by its well-defined ochre dorsal stripe. It has a dense speckled pattern throughout its body; the rest of its body color ranges from a grayish-brown to a dark gray. They have an oval-shaped head with a rounded snout. This species shows little-to-no dimorphism between sexes. It is noted to have a shorter tail than Onychodactylus japonicus.

== Distribution ==
The Tsukuba clawed salamander has a very small range. It prefers colder climates and higher elevations, primarily being found only in the upper half of the Tsukuba and Kaba mountain ranges in eastern Japan. There are two known subpopulations, divided between the mountain ranges. It is found 350 m (1,150 ft) above sea level. It has been noted that this species of salamander may have the smallest distributional range of all salamanders endemic to Japan. The total extent of occurrence is about 63 km^{2} (24 sq mi).

== Endangered ==
The IUCN Red List has listed the Tsukuba clawed salamander as critically endangered. Its population is declining, still facing a number of threats. One major threat was the collection for use in the pet trade. This practice has become illegal in Japan since 2015, eliminating this threat to the population. Other major threats include: mining, logging, roads, and pollution of water and air. Although the Tsukuba clawed salamander is a protected species in Japan, it continues to suffer from habitat loss.
