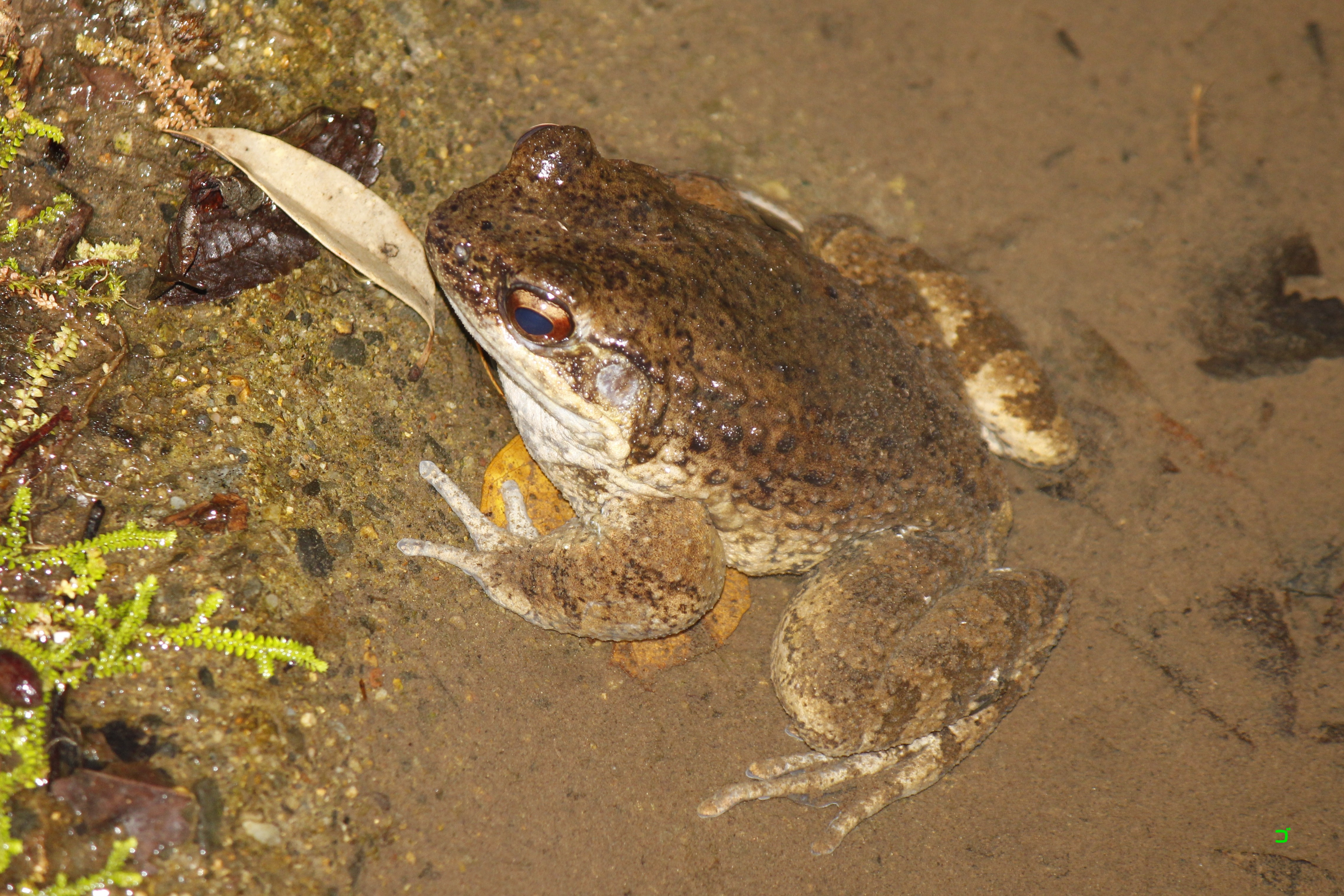

Conservation status
- Endangered (IUCN 3.1)

Scientific classification
- Kingdom: Animalia
- Phylum: Chordata
- Class: Amphibia
- Order: Anura
- Family: Ranidae
- Genus: Babina
- Species: B. subaspera

Binomial name
- Babina subaspera (Barbour, 1908)

Synonyms
- Rana subaspera Barbour, 1908

= Otton frog =

Species of amphibian

The Otton frog (Babina subaspera) is a species of frog in the family Ranidae. It is endemic to the islands of Amami Ōshima and Kakeromajima in the Ryukyu Islands, Japan. Its natural habitats are subtropical or tropical moist lowland forests, freshwater marshes, and intermittent freshwater marshes. Once considered a delicacy as a source of food, it is now threatened by habitat loss through deforestation, and predation by introduced mongooses. Otton Frogs have a lifespan of approximately 7 years which is significantly different to common frog species' life span of 10 -12 years. Due to the isolated island ecosystem, many factors play into the endangerment and the shorter lifespan of the species.

It is one of only two species (the other being Babina holsti) to possess a "pseudothumb" on the forelimbs.

== Physiology and morphology ==
The Otton frog has been denoted the 'wolverine frog' due to hidden retractable claws, which are sharp and shoot out from under their thumbs. Both male and female Otton frogs have these claws, with male claws being typically longer than those of the females.

Like the Hypsiboas rosenbergi frogs of Latin America, the Otton frog possess a thumb-like structure called the pseudothumb on its forelimbs, giving the impression of a total of five fingers. The pseudothumb helps the Otton frog defend themselves from predators.

== Behaviour ==
This rare frog uses its switch-blade claws to fight and in mating. Although both sexes have claws, apparently only the males use them, probably to anchor the female to the male during mating.

During fighting, two male Otton frogs wrestle each other until in an embrace. They then impale their opponent on their retractable spikes.
