= Onychodactylus fuscus =

Scientific classification
- Kingdom: Animalia
- Phylum: Chordata
- Class: Amphibia
- Order: Urodela
- Family: Hynobiidae
- Genus: Onychodactylus
- Species: O. fuscus

Binomial name
- Onychodactylus fuscus Yoshikawa & Matsui, 2014

Species of amphibian

Onychodactylus fuscus, the Tadami clawed salamander, is a species of clawed salamander from Japan. It is known to occur in four different localities in the Fukushima and Niigata Prefectures, including Tadami and Sanjō. The species grows 14 centimetres (5.5 in) to 16 centimetres (6.3 in) long, and differs from the Japanese clawed salamander (O. japonicus) by having a long tail and wide head, as well as lacking a dorsal stripe. O. fuscus lives in streams and breeds during the winter. The species is closely related to Onychodactylus intermedius. It shares much of its habitat with O. japonicus, but the two species are reproductively isolated.
