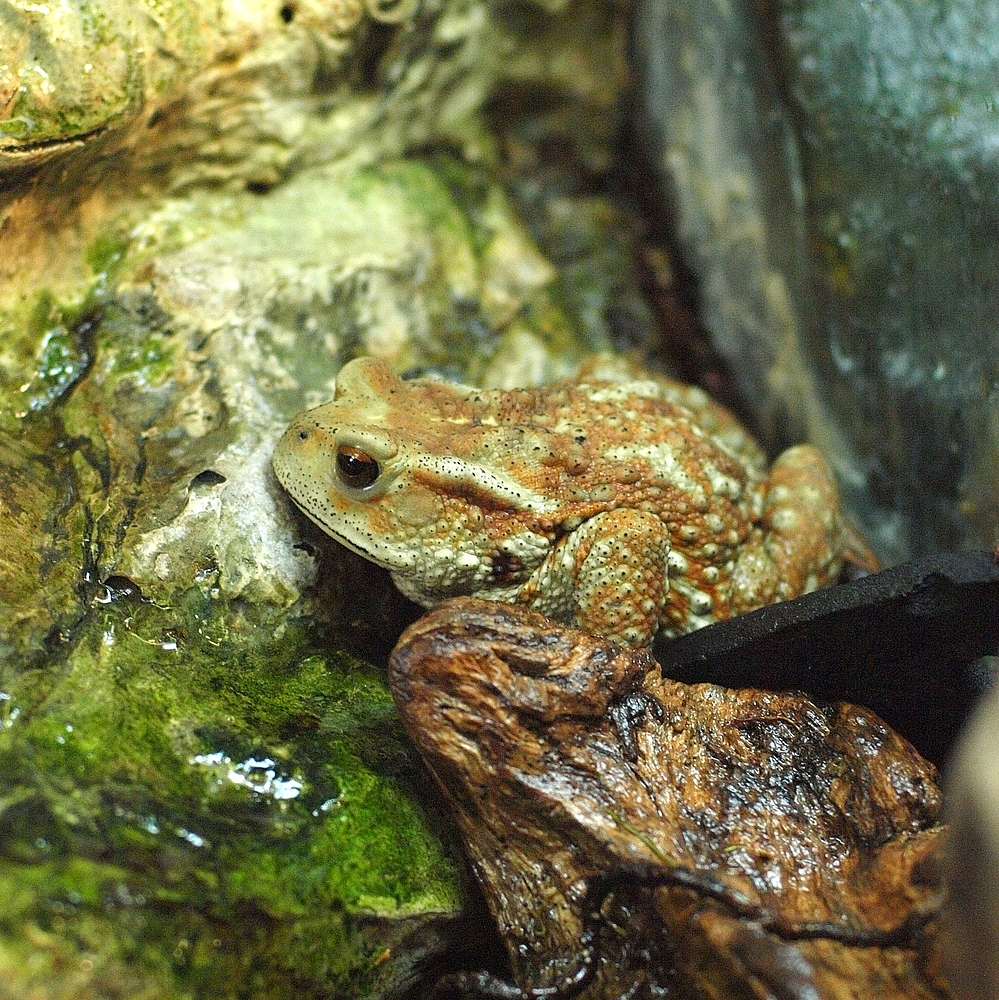

Scientific classification
- Domain: Eukaryota
- Kingdom: Animalia
- Phylum: Chordata
- Class: Amphibia
- Order: Anura
- Family: Bufonidae
- Genus: Bufo
- Species: B. gargarizans
- Subspecies: B. g. miyakonis

Trinomial name
- Bufo gargarizans miyakonis Okada, 1931

Synonyms
- Bufo bufo miyakonis (protonym); Bufo japonicus miyakonis Bufo gargarizans miyakonis

= Miyako toad =

Subspecies of toad

The Miyako toad (Bufo gargarizans miyakonis) is a subspecies of the Asiatic toad that is native to the Miyako Islands, in the Ryūkyū Islands of Japan.

== Taxonomy ==
In 1927, Japanese zoologist Okada Yaichirō included Bufo bufo miyakonis (Schlegel) in a study of the country's "tailless batrachians"; however, no further details were provided, making this a nomen nudum. The Miyako toad was first described, as Bufo bufo miyakonis, i.e., as a subspecies of the Common toad, by Okada in 1931, with Miyako-jima in the Ryūkyū Islands given as the type locality. In 1947, Inger, arguing that Okada did not sufficiently distinguish his new subspecies from the Asiatic toad of China, treated this name as a synonym of Bufo bufo gargarizans. In 1980, Kawamura Toshijirō et al., based on laboratory crosses, recommended the toad be treated as a subspecies of the Japanese common toad, as Bufo japonicus miyakonis. In 1984, Matsui Masafumi concluded the Miyako toad was a subspecies of the Asiatic toad, i.e., Bufo gargarizans miyakonis. In its native Japan, the toad's vernacular name is Miyako hiki-gaeru (ミヤコヒキガエル). Though sometimes thought to have been introduced, a Late Pleistocene fossil bufonid has been identified from Miyako-jima.

== Description ==
The Miyako toad is somewhat warty, but less so than the Japanese common toad. It has a grey-brown to reddish-brown back with some paler spots and stripes, and a whitish belly with some black spots. Males have a snout–vent length (SVL) of 61–113 millimetres (2.4–4.4 in), with a mean of 85 millimetres (3.3 in), while females are a little larger, at 77–119 millimetres (3.0–4.7 in), mean of 97 millimetres (3.8 in). Its width is around 36% of its SVL, its hand and arm length, 44%, the length of its tibia, 35% in males and 33% in females, and its relatively flat parotoid gland, c. 17%. Males have black nuptial pads. There is no vocal sac.

== Distribution and habitat ==
The Miyako toad is native to Miyako-jima and Irabu-jima in the Miyako Islands, where it lives among the grasses and fields of sugarcane, but has also been introduced to Okinawa Island as well as Kitadaitō-jima and Minamidaitō-jima in the Daitō Islands.

== Ecology ==
The Miyako toad's diet largely comprises small invertebrates such as ants, beetles, snails, and worms. The breeding season runs from September to March. Its mating call includes five distinct notes, lasting in total some 1.5 seconds. Females lay some twelve to fourteen thousand eggs, some 1.7–2.0 millimetres (0.067–0.079 in) in diameter. The small dark tadpoles reach a length of around 30 millimetres (1.2 in); the SVL on metamorphosis, which occurs after March, is 11 millimetres (0.43 in).

== Conservation ==
The Miyako toad is classed as Near Threatened on the Ministry of the Environment Red List.

== See also ==
- List of amphibians of Japan
- List of Natural Monuments of Japan (Okinawa)
- Irabu Prefectural Natural Park
- Pinza-Abu Cave Man
