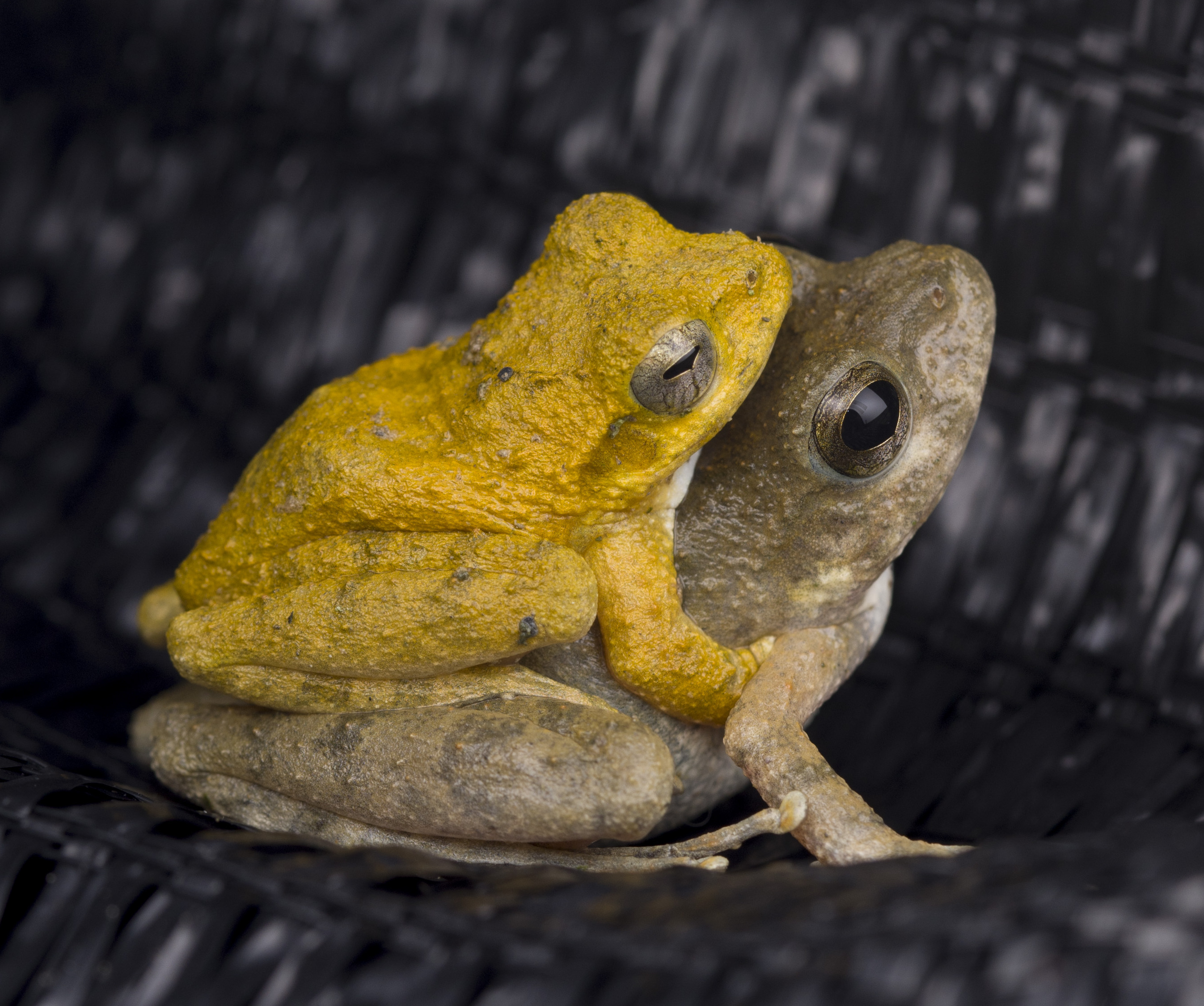
- Male and female in amplexus

Conservation status
- Least Concern (IUCN 3.1)

Scientific classification
- Kingdom: Animalia
- Phylum: Chordata
- Class: Amphibia
- Order: Anura
- Family: Rhacophoridae
- Genus: Buergeria
- Species: B. otai

Binomial name
- Buergeria otai Wang et al., 2020

= Buergeria otai =

Species of amphibian

Buergeria otai is a species of frog in the family Rhacophoridae. It is endemic to Taiwan and found in the eastern and southern parts of the island. Buergeria choui, (Note: At the time of the species description, these populations were still known as Buergeria japonica.) with whom Buergeria otai was confused before being described as a distinct species in 2017, occurs in northwestern Taiwan. The two species have only a narrow contact zone and can be distinguished based on genetic markers, calls, and morphology.

== Etymology ==
The specific name otai honours professor Hidetoshi Ota, in recognition of his "great contribution to herpetology and biogeography in East Asia". A common name Ota's stream tree frog has been suggested for this species.

== Description ==
Adult males measure 23–29 mm (0.91–1.14 in) and adult females 30–38 mm (1.2–1.5 in) in snout–vent length. The body is elongated and moderately slender. The tympanum is barely discernible, whereas the supratympanic fold is prominent. Males have comparatively large subgular vocal sac. The fingers are slender, without webbing, and bear medium-sized discs. The toes are long, partially webbed, and also bear medium-sized discs. Dorsal coloration is variable, depending on light conditions and the background. During the daytime, resting frogs are usually grayish. Calling males at night shows a range of colors, from gray, yellow, gold, light brown, to dark orange. There is a dark dorsal marking resembling the letter X or H that may almost fade away. Females usually turn brownish during amplexus. The chin and the belly are gray-white. The chin has small irregular mottling and there are tiny white spots on the ventral side of the thighs.

Buergeria otai can emit two types of calls, "short calls" consisting of regular, long and lasting consecutive pulses (usually about 16–17), and "long calls" that have a major peak at the beginning, a serial of vary rapid pulses, and usually an ending with another short peak. The former call is similar to the call of Buergeria japonica, whereas the latter is unique.

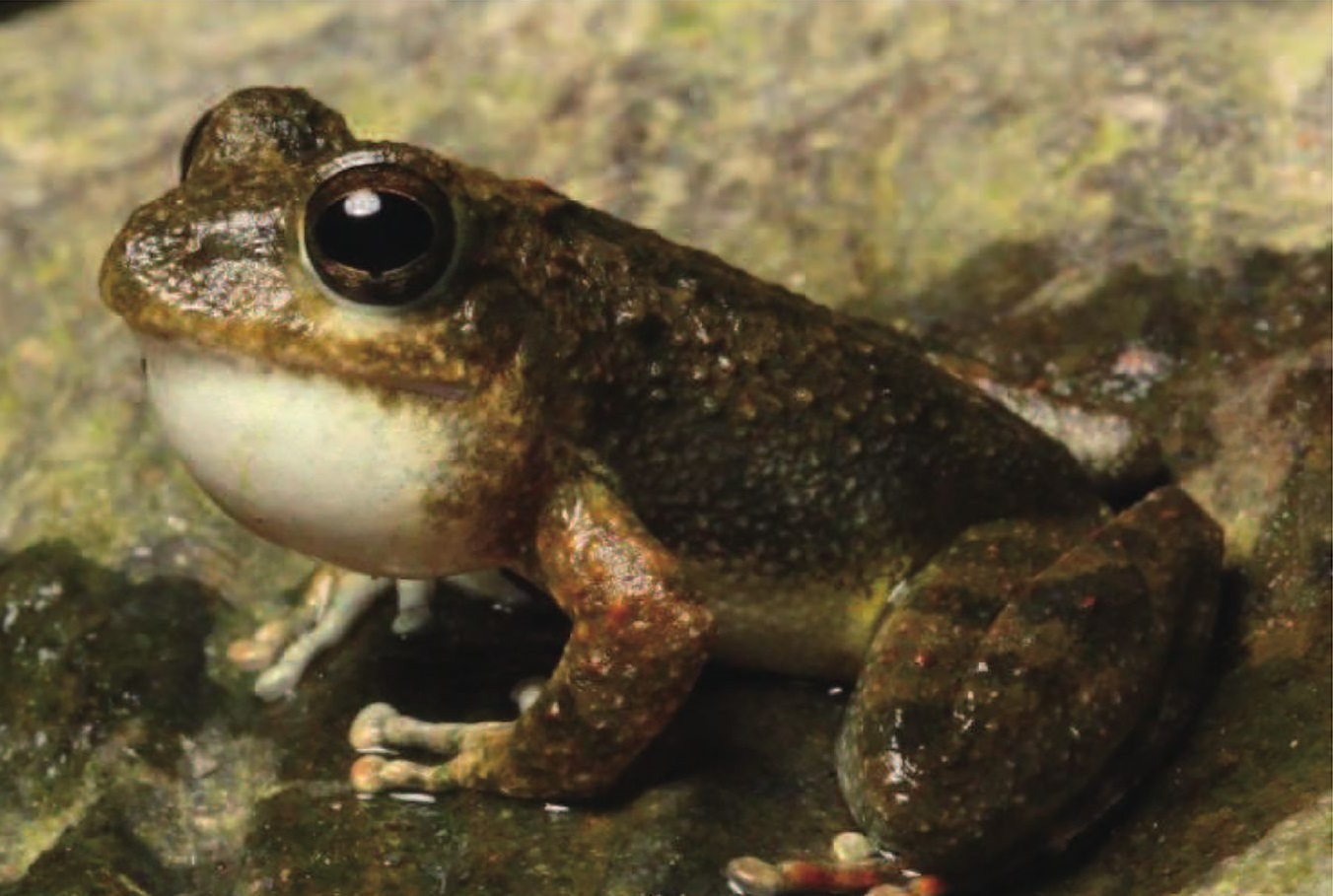
Calling male

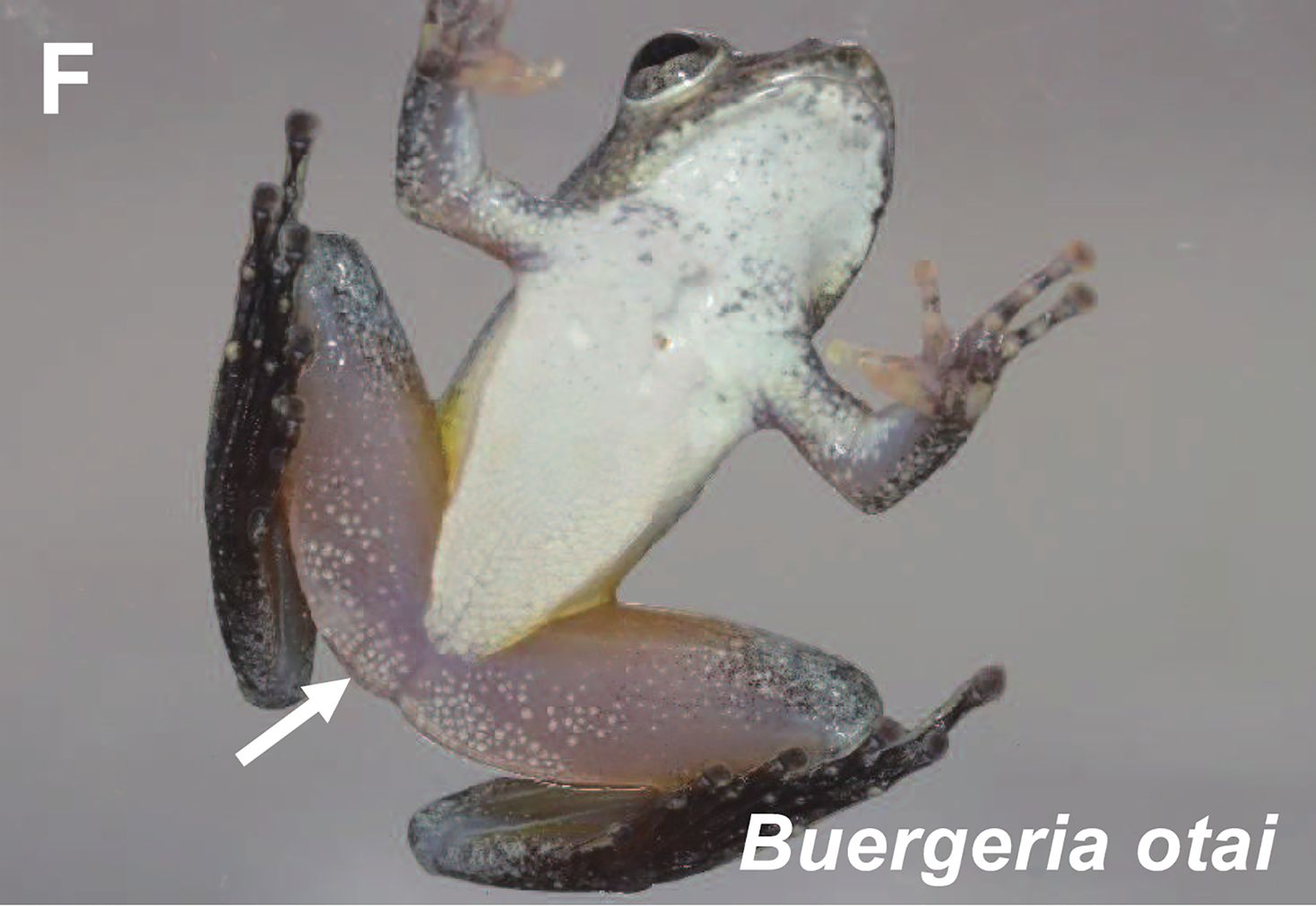
Ventral view

== Habitat and conservation ==
Buergeria otai is associated with streams at elevations below 1,500 m (4,900 ft). They are primarily found in small ditches or shallow waters near the streams, rather than in the major river course. Reproduction can take place year round, but peak breeding occurs in April to July. The tadpoles are benthic herbivores or detritivores and live in shallow waters. Similarly to Buergeria choui, this species has a tolerance to high temperatures found in hot springs. The tadpoles may even seek high temperatures. Whether this species also shares the salt tolerance of Buergeria choui is unknown.

Wang and colleagues suggest that Buergeria otai might be the most abundant rhacophorid in Taiwan; there are huge populations especially in the eastern part of Taiwan. It is considered a fairly adaptable species that is not facing major threats.
