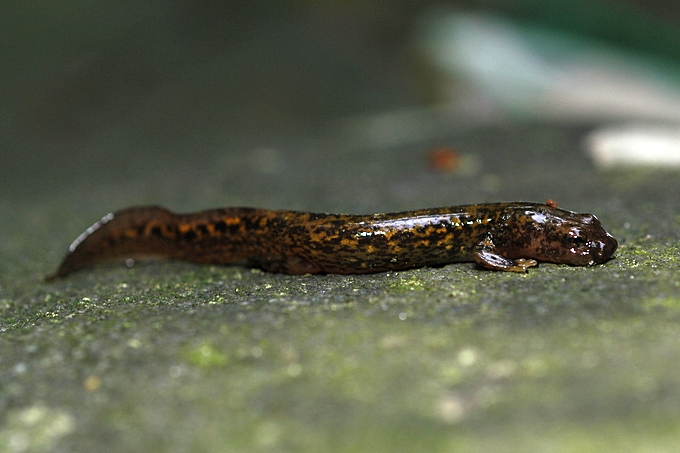

Conservation status
- Near Threatened (IUCN 3.1)

Scientific classification
- Kingdom: Animalia
- Phylum: Chordata
- Class: Amphibia
- Order: Urodela
- Family: Hynobiidae
- Genus: Onychodactylus
- Species: O. fischeri

Binomial name
- Onychodactylus fischeri (Boulenger, 1886)

Synonyms
- Onychodactylus rossicus Nikolsky, 1914

= Onychodactylus fischeri =

Species of amphibian

Onychodactylus fischeri, also known as Fischer's clawed salamander or Russian clawed salamander, is a lungless salamander found in the Russian Far East. It was thought to have ranged throughout Northeast Asia, but this was based on paraphyletic species assignment, and the Chinese and Korean populations are now considered as distinct species.

It has 78 chromosomes in total (27 pairs of microchromosomes, six pairs of medium-sized chromosomes, and six pairs of large chromosomes).

Onychodactylus fischeri is known to live at elevations up to 1000 m, and favors thickly-vegetated stretches of pebble-bottomed mountain streams, with little direct sunlight. It may also be found near underground springs. The mating season is from mid-March to mid-May. The eggs are laid in streams; the aquatic larvae emerge after approximately 5 weeks. It is threatened by habitat change, such as tree felling in stream headwaters.

The adult males of the species are 17–18 cm long; adult females are slightly longer, 18–19 cm. The dorsal aspect is yellowish brown, with bands of dark brown spots throughout. The ventral aspect is lighter in color, without spots. The head is small, flat and oval. The skin is smooth overall, but with one groove running along the center of the back. The tail is longer than the head and body combined, a fact from which the salamander takes its common name.
