= Buergeria oxycephala =

Conservation status
- Vulnerable (IUCN 3.1)

Scientific classification
- Kingdom: Animalia
- Phylum: Chordata
- Class: Amphibia
- Order: Anura
- Family: Rhacophoridae
- Genus: Buergeria
- Species: B. oxycephala

Binomial name
- Buergeria oxycephala (Boulenger, 1900)

Synonyms
- Rhacophorus oxycephalus Boulenger, 1900

Species of frog

Buergeria oxycephala (Hainan stream treefrog or red-headed flying frog) is a species of frog in the family Rhacophoridae. It is endemic to Hainan Island, China.

This frog lives in hilly habitats between 80 and 1000 meters above sea level on Hainan Island. It has been observed near larger streams, usually in forests. The adults are found perched on rocks. The female frog lays eggs in still water. The tadpoles develop in puddles.

The IUCN classifies this frog as vulnerable to extinction because it has a small range that is subject to ongoing habitat degradation, such as the conversion of land to agriculture for rubber and other crops.
