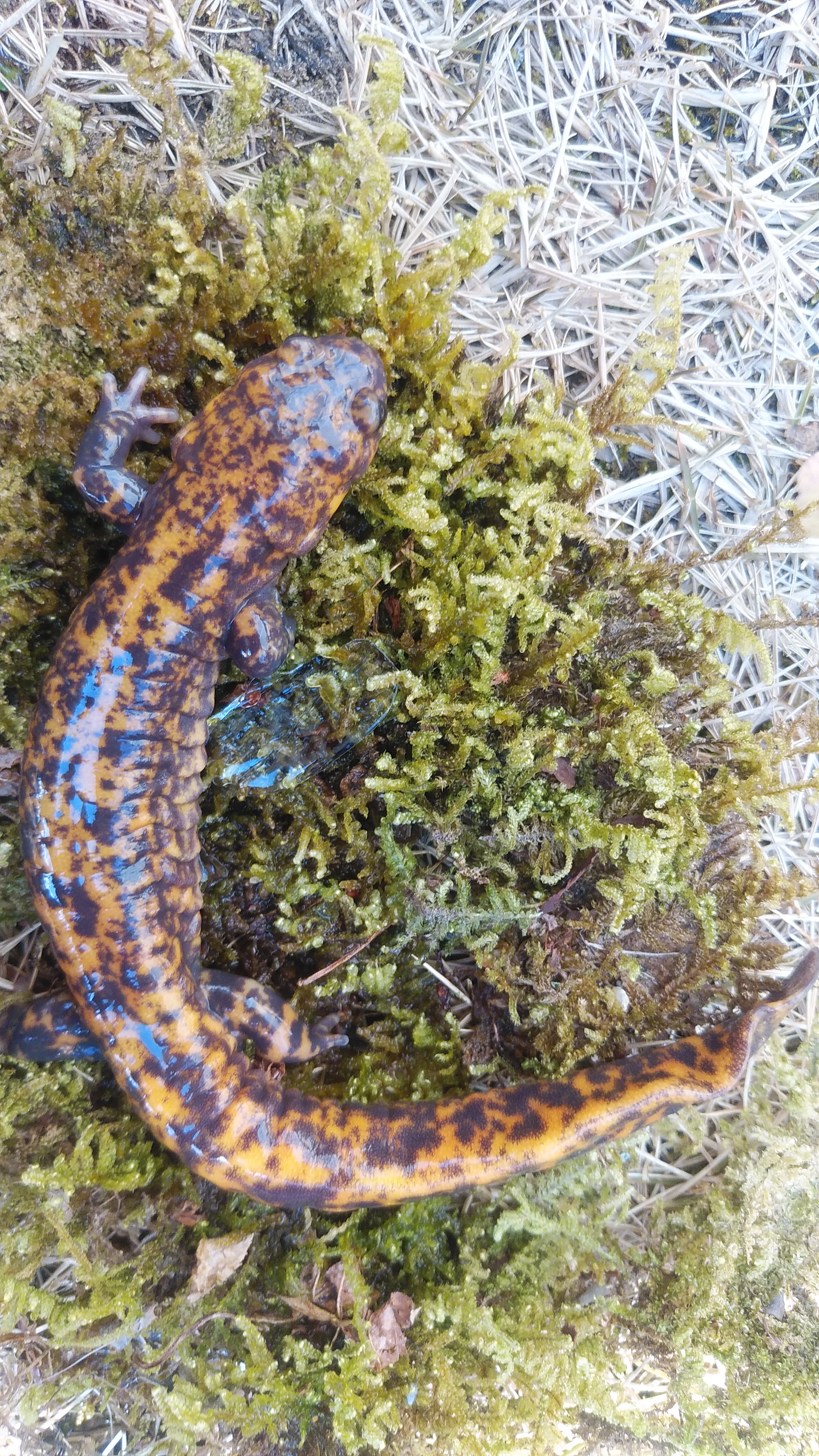

Scientific classification
- Kingdom: Animalia
- Phylum: Chordata
- Class: Amphibia
- Order: Urodela
- Family: Hynobiidae
- Genus: Hynobius
- Species: H. ikioi

Binomial name
- Hynobius ikioi Matsui, Nishikawa & Tominanga, 2017

= Hynobius ikioi =

Species of salamander

Hynobius ikioi is a species of salamander in the family Hynobiidae, endemic to Kyushu in Japan.

== Physical characteristics ==
Hynobius ikioi is very close to Hynobius amakusaensis and Hynobius osumiensis, both also from Kyushu, but is easily distinguished from them by its uniquely bi-colored dorsum.

== Taxonomy ==
This species was described in 2017 by Matsui, Nishikawa & Tominanga; it was previously thought to be a population of Hynobius stejnegeri.
