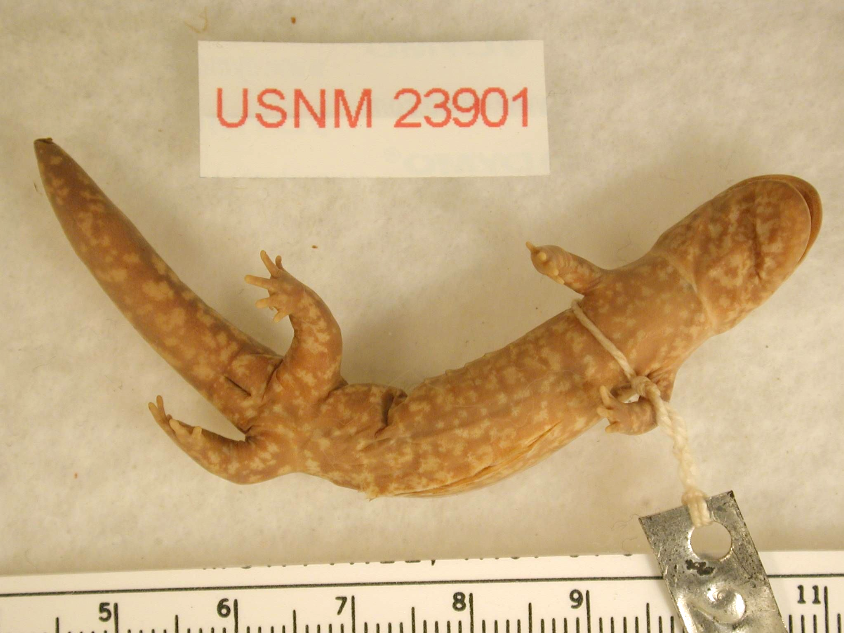

Conservation status
- Near Threatened (IUCN 3.1)

Scientific classification
- Kingdom: Animalia
- Phylum: Chordata
- Class: Amphibia
- Order: Urodela
- Family: Hynobiidae
- Genus: Hynobius
- Species: H. stejnegeri

Binomial name
- Hynobius stejnegeri Dunn, 1923

Synonyms
- Hynobius yatsui Oyama, 1947 (See text)

= Amber-colored salamander =

Amber salamander

Species of amphibian

The amber salamander, amber-colored salamander, tortoiseshell salamander, or Stejneger's oriental salamander (Hynobius stejnegeri) is a species of salamander in the family Hynobiidae, endemic to Japan. Its natural habitats are temperate forests and rivers. It is threatened by habitat loss.

== Physical characteristics ==
As its name suggests, the external appearance is that of semitransparent blackish brown ground color, blotched with bright amber. Its ventral surface is lighter and without blotches. The amber salamander has a snout-to-vent length of 76–85 mm and a total length of 137–155 mm. However, individuals have been reported to have been nearly 200 mm in length. The head appears to be oval when viewed from above and the eyes are prominent, and a gular fold is present. It has a robust and cylindrical body with 13 to 14 costal grooves. It is similar to Hynobius kimurae in color, but has only four toes, a longer series of vomerine teeth, and a longer body.

== Taxonomy ==
According to a recent study led by Matsui, Nishikawa and Tominaga, Hynobius stejnegeri and Hynobius yatsui are identical. The name H. yatsui is therefore relegated to a subjective junior synonym of H. stejnegeri. According to the same study, a population of Hynobius stejnegeri from Kyushu should be treated as a new species Hynobius ikioi.

== Habitat and ecology ==
This species of salamander is found only in Kyushu, Japan, and is distributed among the mountainous areas of the prefectures of Kumamoto, Miyazaki, and Northern Kagoshima. The various regional populations of the amber salamanders are separated by a number of geographic barriers, including the Gokase River and the Aso Volcano, the Kirishima Volcano, and the Yatsushiro Sea. It can be found in both terrestrial (land) and freshwater ecosystems. Its land habitat is located in temperate forests which consist of mountainous areas of broad-leaved, evergreen forests, as well as mixed forests. The freshwater habitat is located in wetlands of permanent rivers, streams, and creeks, including waterfalls. Habitats have been discovered in and around mountainous streams at altitudes ranging from 500 to 1500 m. They return to upstream areas to breed, and this is also where the larvae develop. Their diets are made up of insects, spiders, worms, aquatic insect larvae, and crustaceans, and they have been known to resort to cannibalism. The unique possible cryptic coloration is hypothesized to act as a camouflage among fallen leaves. If the color pattern is an effective deterrent from predators, then this characteristic is likely due to strong selection. A genetic variance of 4% was found to be due to phenological circumstances in the populations of amber salamander between two regions separated by geographic isolation.

== Behavior ==
The egg sacs produced by the males are quite long, ranging from 17 to 30 cm and differ from other species of the same genus, Hynobius boulengeri, by not having the prominent whip-like formation on the free end. Each clutch ranges from 21 to 57 eggs, and the female remains close to her clutch until the eggs have hatched. The hatched larvae are a yellowish color and the fingers and toes sport black claws. These larvae undergo a metamorphosis while living in the stream, and emerge in September and October of the same year they are laid, but many wintering larvae remain in the stream until spring or summer of the following year when they emerge.

== Threats ==
The amber salamander is harmed by hunting and trapping, logging, and wood harvesting. Major threats also include the construction of roads, deforestation, erosion, and pollution. The amber salamander is also used for medicine and food. H. stejnegeri is also used in the medical field of comparative hepatology. In an experiment, when the mother was removed, the eggs vanished, presumably eaten by freshwater crabs or some other predator. This suggests survival of the larvae is contingent on the mother's protection.

== Conservation ==
The extent of occurrence is less than 20,000 km^{2}, the species are fragmented in distribution, regionally only in Japan, with a continuing decline in the extent and quality of their habitat. The amber salamander was considered near threatened by the Environment Agency of Japan in 2000. It was determined near threatened by the International Union for Conservation of Nature (IUCN) in 2021. Now, the amber salamander is on the Earth's Endangered Creatures List. It is designated a natural monument by Kumamoto Prefecture. There is a need to ensure the capture of this species from the wild is managed in a sustainable way.
