= Hynobius amakusaensis =

Conservation status
- Critically Endangered (IUCN 3.1)

Scientific classification
- Kingdom: Animalia
- Phylum: Chordata
- Class: Amphibia
- Order: Urodela
- Family: Hynobiidae
- Genus: Hynobius
- Species: H. amakusaensis

Binomial name
- Hynobius amakusaensis Nishikawa and Matsui, 2014

Species of amphibian

Hynobius amakusaensis, commonly called the Amakusa salamander, is a species of salamander in the family Hynobiidae. It is endemic to Kamishima in the Amakusa Islands of Japan.
