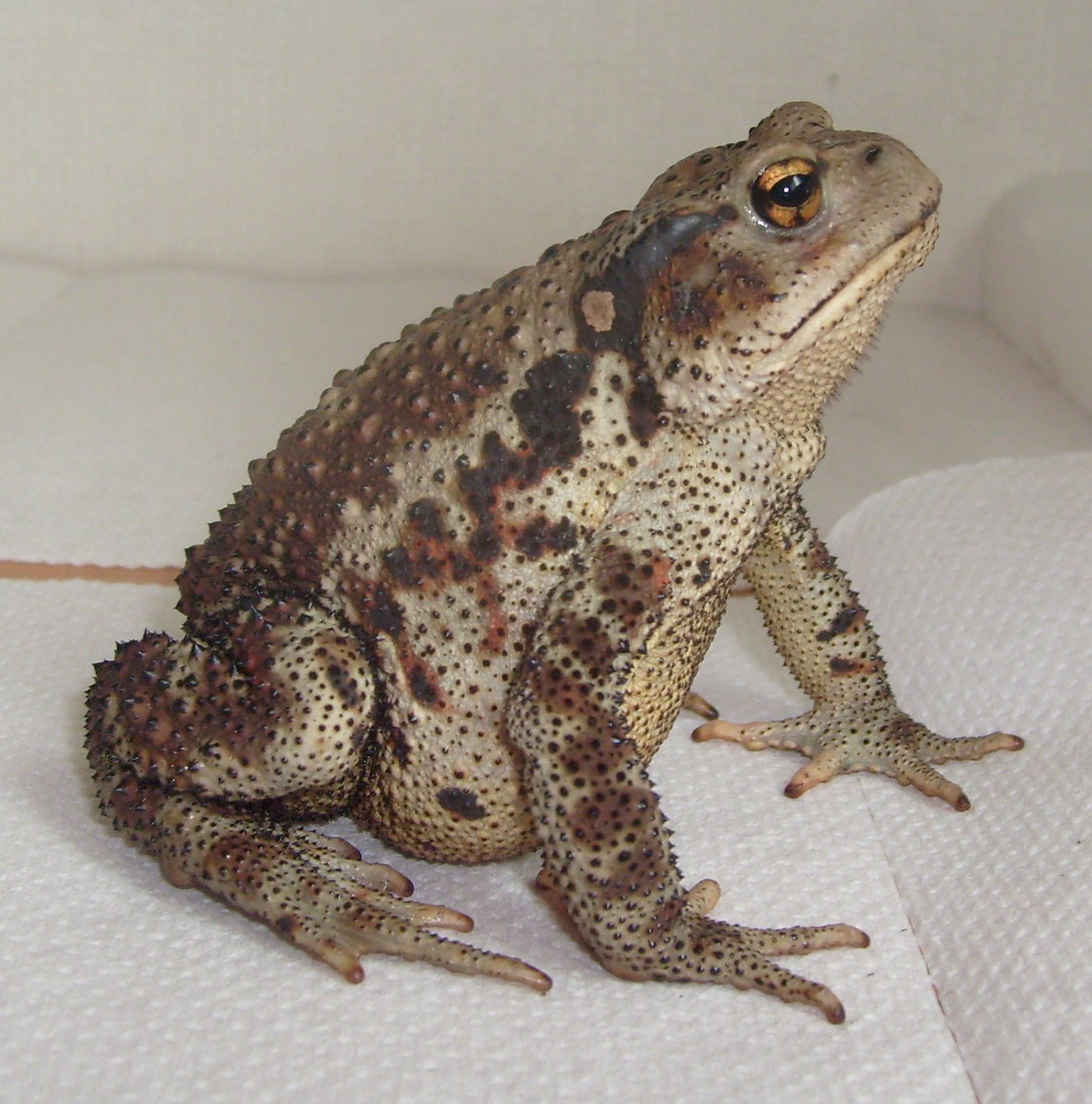
- Specimen collected on mountainside in Miryang, South Korea.

Conservation status
- Least Concern (IUCN 3.1)

Scientific classification
- Kingdom: Animalia
- Phylum: Chordata
- Class: Amphibia
- Order: Anura
- Family: Bufonidae
- Genus: Bufo
- Species: B. gargarizans

Binomial name
- Bufo gargarizans Cantor, 1842

= Asiatic toad =

Species of toad

The Asiatic toad or Chusan Island toad (Bufo gargarizans) is a species of toad endemic to East Asia. The species was previously classified as Bufo bufo gargarizans, a subspecies of the common toad.

== Distribution and habitat ==
It is common in China (specifically Anhui, Fujian, Gansu, Guizhou, Hebei, Heilongjiang, Henan, Hubei, Hunan, Inner Mongolia, Jiangsu, Jiangxi, Jilin, Qinghai, Shaanxi, Shandong, Shanxi, Sichuan, and Zhejiang) and portions of the Russian Far East (up north to the Amur River valley and on Sakhalin Island, and east to Transbaikalia in Siberia), but relatively rare on the Korean Peninsula. Asiatic toads are also found on the Miyako Islands of southern Japan, although they have been extirpated from some islands in recent years, possibly including Okinawa. The Miyako subspecies, Bufo gargarizans miyakonis, is also known as the Miyako toad.

The Asiatic toad avoids dense forests, but is found in most other habitats, including grasslands, open forests, meadows, and cultivated areas. It prefers humid areas, and is rarely found at altitudes of more than 800 meters.

== Relationship with humans ==
The Asiatic toad plays an important role in traditional Chinese medicine. An extract of the toxins secreted by the toad, known as toad venom or chan-su, has long been touted for its medicinal properties. In addition, dried toad skins have been prescribed as remedies for dropsy and other ailments. More recently, Western medical science has also taken an interest in the toad. In 1998, an antimicrobial peptide was extracted from the toad, and patented.

== Gallery ==
A full-grown male Asiatic toad housed with a captive mature female American bullfrog Rana catesbeiana

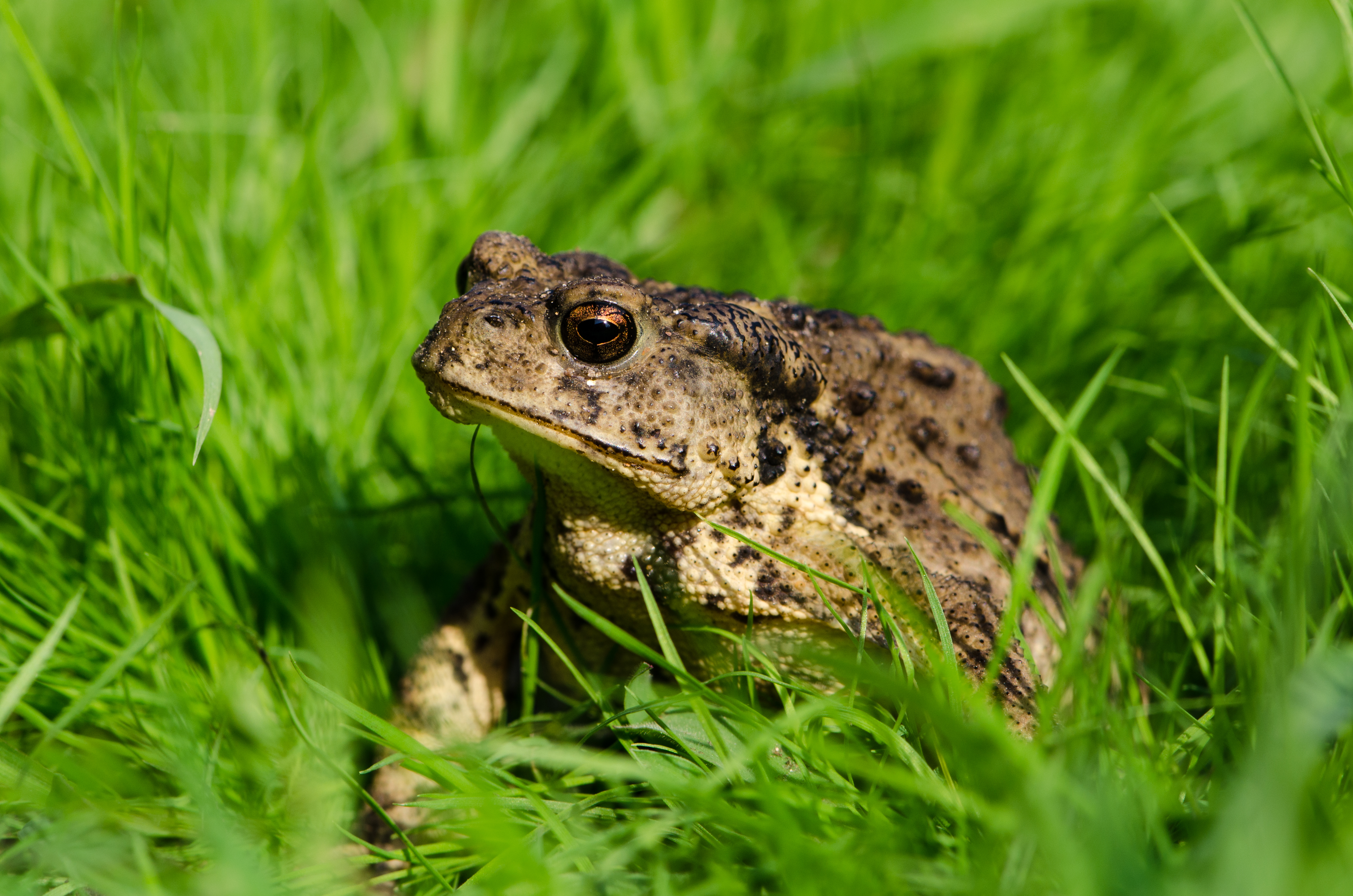
Bufo gargarizans in a garden in Liaoning Province, China

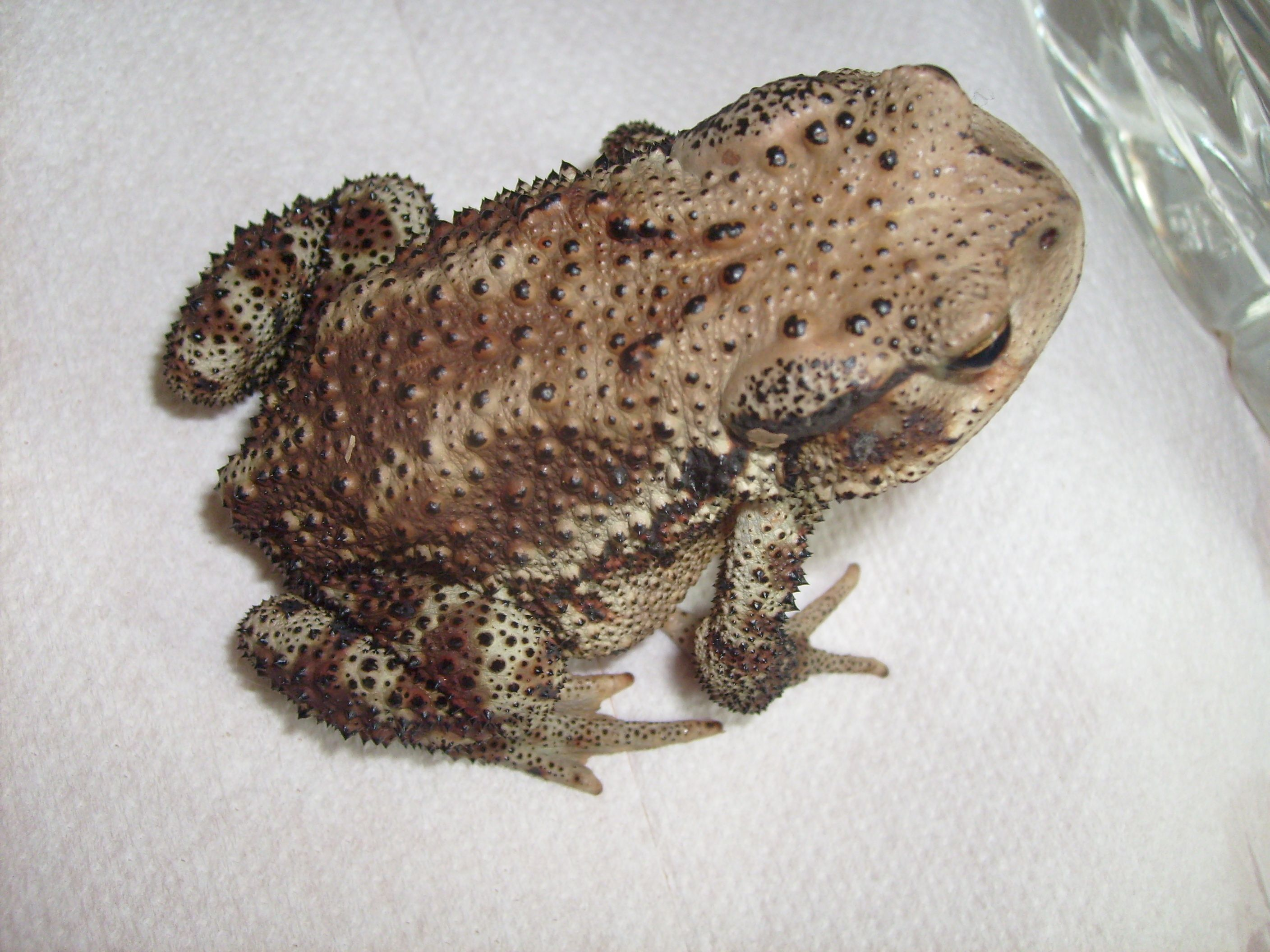

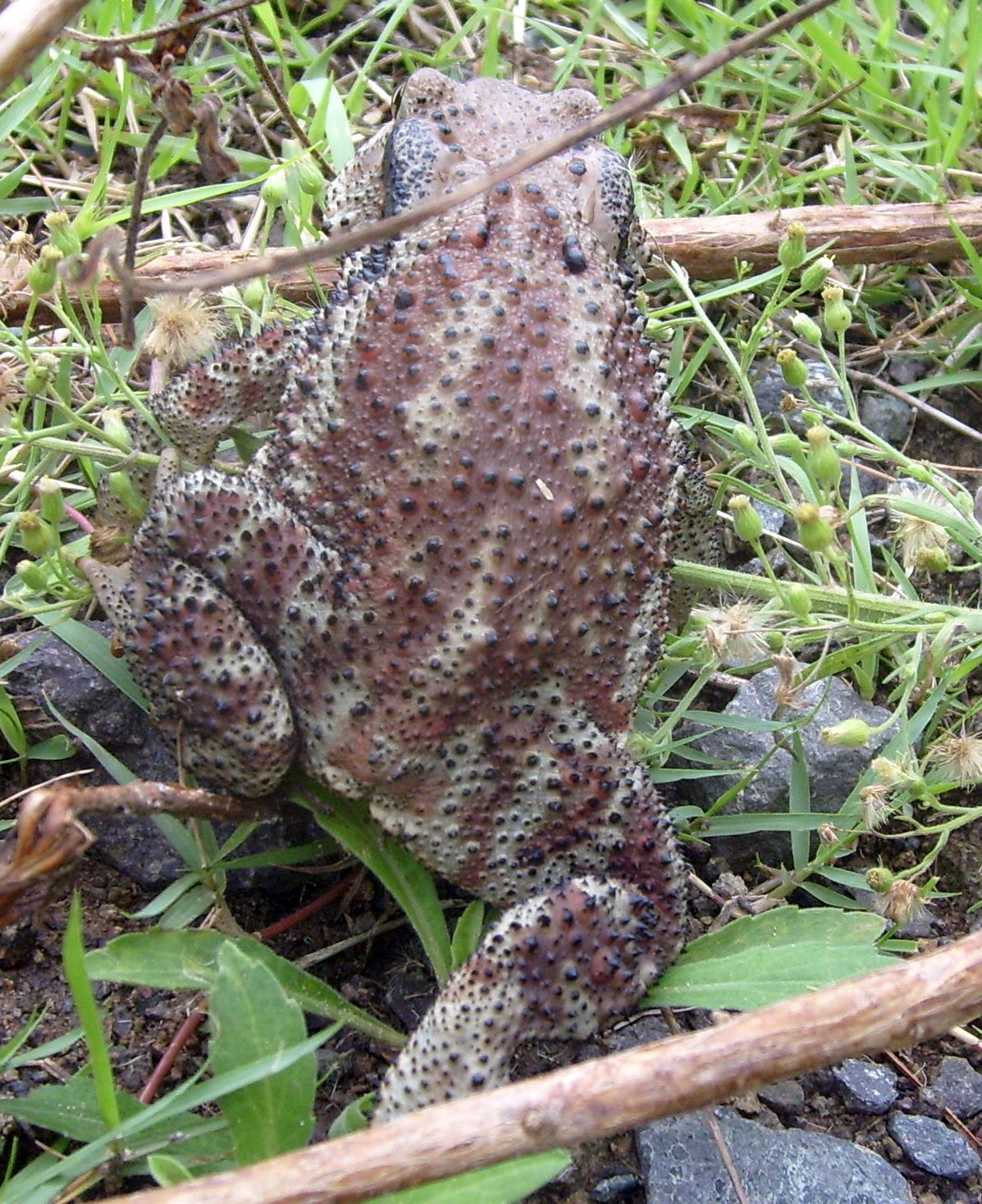

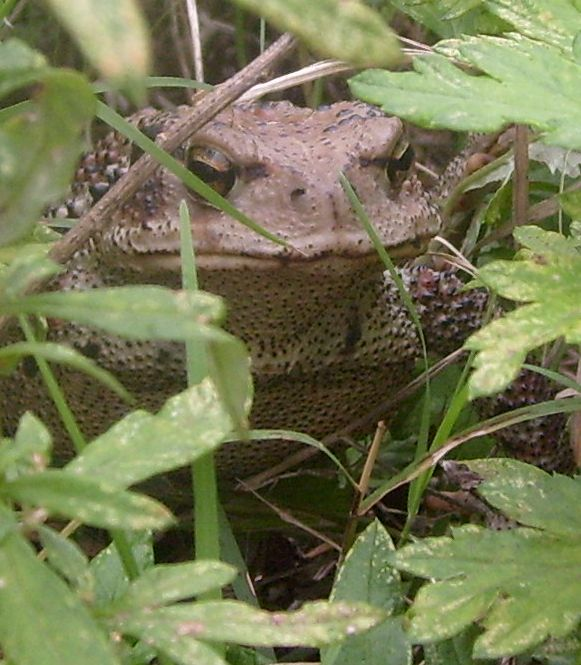

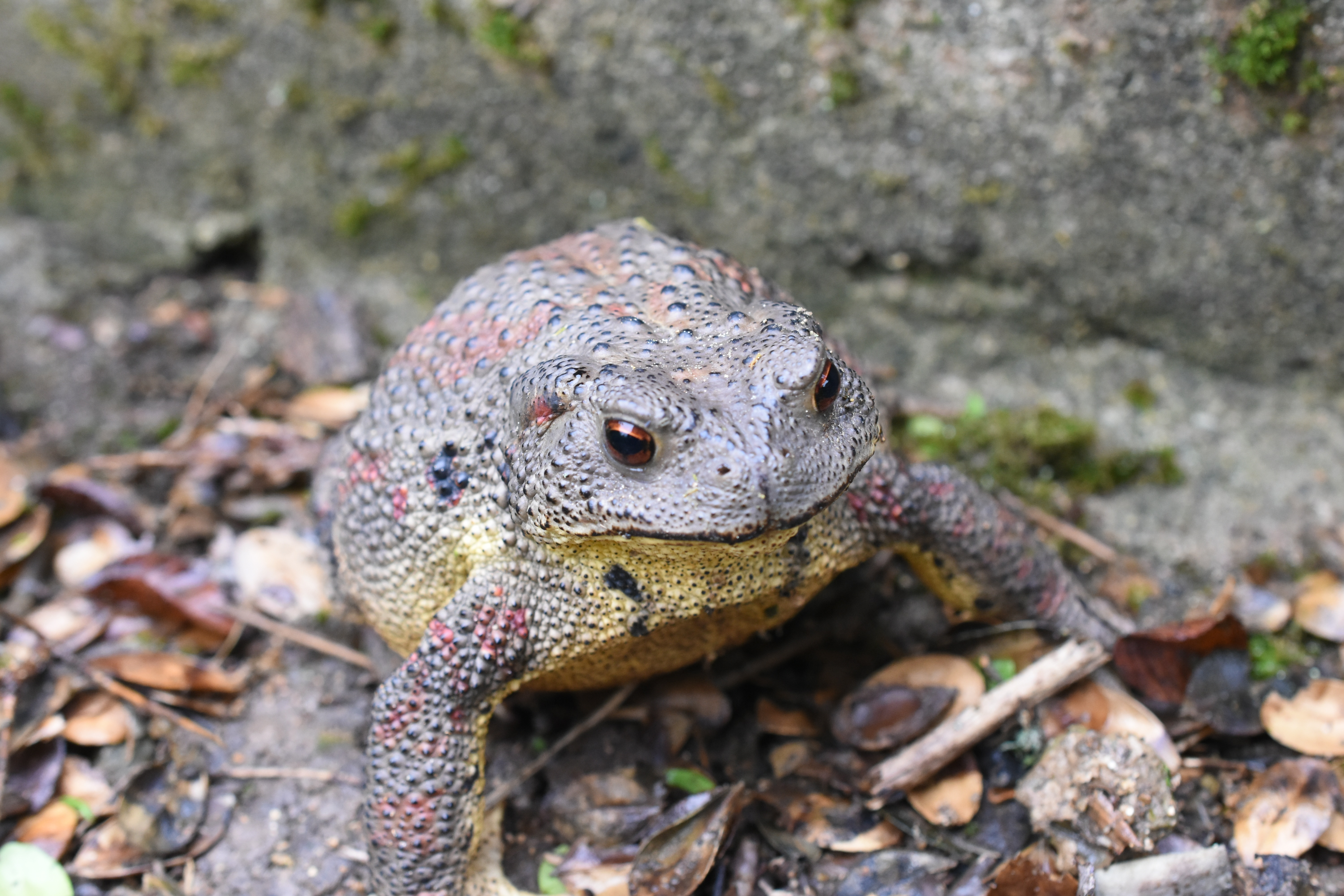

== See also ==
- Bufotoxins
- Dobrovirus bufonis
- Jin Chan
- List of amphibians of Korea
