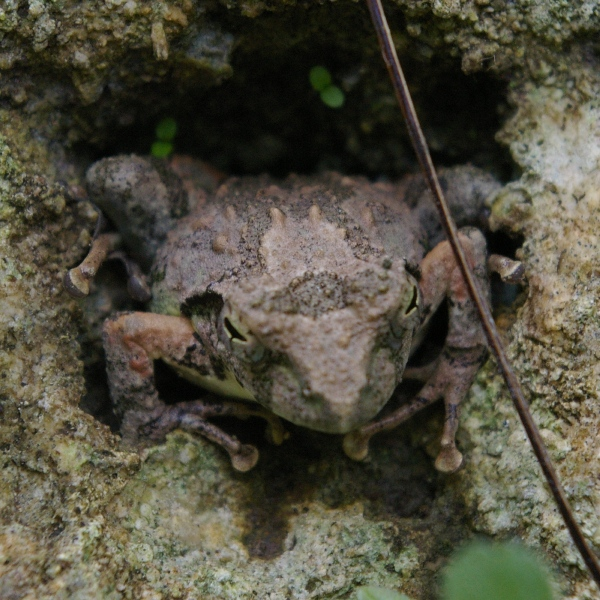
- Buergeria japonica

Scientific classification
- Kingdom: Animalia
- Phylum: Chordata
- Class: Amphibia
- Order: Anura
- Family: Rhacophoridae
- Subfamily: Buergeriinae; Channing, 1989
- Genus: Buergeria; Tschudi, 1838

Type species
- Hyla bürgeri Temminck & Schlegel, 1838

Diversity
- 6 species, see text.

= Buergeria =

Genus of amphibians

Buergeria is a genus of frogs in the family Rhacophoridae, and the sole genus of subfamily Buergeriinae. It is the sister taxon for all the other rhacophorids (subfamily Rhacophorinae). The available genetic data firmly supports this position.

Buergeria are sometimes known as Buerger's frogs. The six species are found only in the islands of East Asia, from Hainan (China) and Taiwan through the Ryukyu Islands to Honshu (Japan).

== Description ==
Buergeria are medium-sized to large frogs (snout-vent length 40–80 mm (1.6–3.1 in)) that resemble in their body form Rana (unlike other rhacophorids). Their skin is smooth and they have no dorsal ornamentations. Their feet are fully webbed whereas their fingers are only up to half-webbed. They produce many eggs that are deposited in water and develop through a tadpole stage.

== Species ==
There are six recognized species in the genus Buergeria:

- Buergeria buergeri (Temminck & Schlegel, 1838) — Kajika Frog. Japan endemic.
- Buergeria choui Matsui & Tominaga, 2020 — Taiwan (northwest and north) and southern Ryukyus (Yaeyama Islands). Species complex with B. otai.
- Buergeria japonica (Hallowell, 1861) — Ryukyu Kajika Frog. Central and northern Ryukyu Islands.
- Buergeria otai Wang, Hsiao, Lee, Tseng, Lin, Komaki & Lin, 2018 — Taiwan (east coast and southwest). Species complex with B. chuoi.
- Buergeria oxycephala (Boulenger, 1900) — Hainan endemic.
- Buergeria robusta (Boulenger, 1909) — Taiwan endemic (with large genetic differences between east coast and west coast populations).

== Conservation ==
The International Union for Conservation of Nature (IUCN) has assessed one of the four species as being vulnerable (Buergeria oxycephala), while the remaining ones are considered being of least concern.
