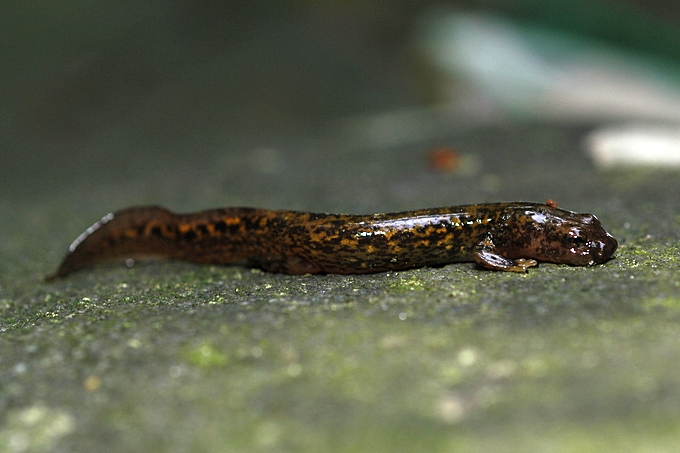
- Onychodactylus fischeri

Scientific classification
- Kingdom: Animalia
- Phylum: Chordata
- Class: Amphibia
- Order: Urodela
- Family: Hynobiidae
- Subfamily: Onychodactylinae; Dubois and Raffaëlli, 2012
- Genus: Onychodactylus; Tscudi, 1838

Species
- See table

= Clawed salamander =

Clawed salamanders

Genus of salamanders

The genus Onychodactylus, commonly known as clawed salamanders, is a genus of salamanders endemic to eastern Asia. Prior to 2012, it was thought to contain only two species: O. fischeri in the Korean Peninsula and Russian Far East, and O. japonicus in Japan, on the islands of Shikoku and Honshū. Later taxonomic revisions have led to many new, microendemic species to be described in the genus. All species are lungless with moderately developed parotoid glands. They inhabit moist, forested mountains near small rivers, streams, and lakes. Adults of each species can reach a length of 19 cm.

== Species ==
Species recognized as of October 2023:

- Onychodactylus fischeri (Boulenger, 1886)
- Onychodactylus fuscus Yoshikawa and Matsui, 2014
- Onychodactylus intermedius Nishikawa and Matsui, 2014
- Onychodactylus japonicus (Houttuyn, 1782)
- Onychodactylus kinneburi Yoshikawa, Matsui, Tanabe, and Okayama, 2013
- Onychodactylus koreanus Min, Poyarkov, and Vieites, 2012
- Onychodactylus nipponoborealis Kuro-o, Poyarkov, and Vieites, 2012
- Onychodactylus pyrrhonotus Yoshikawa and Matsui, 2022
- Onychodactylus sillanus Min, Borzée, and Poyarkov, 2022
- Onychodactylus tsukubaensis Yoshikawa and Matsui, 2013
- Onychodactylus zhangyapingi Che, Poyarkov, and Yan, 2012
- Onychodactylus zhaoermii Che, Poyarkov, and Yan, 2012
