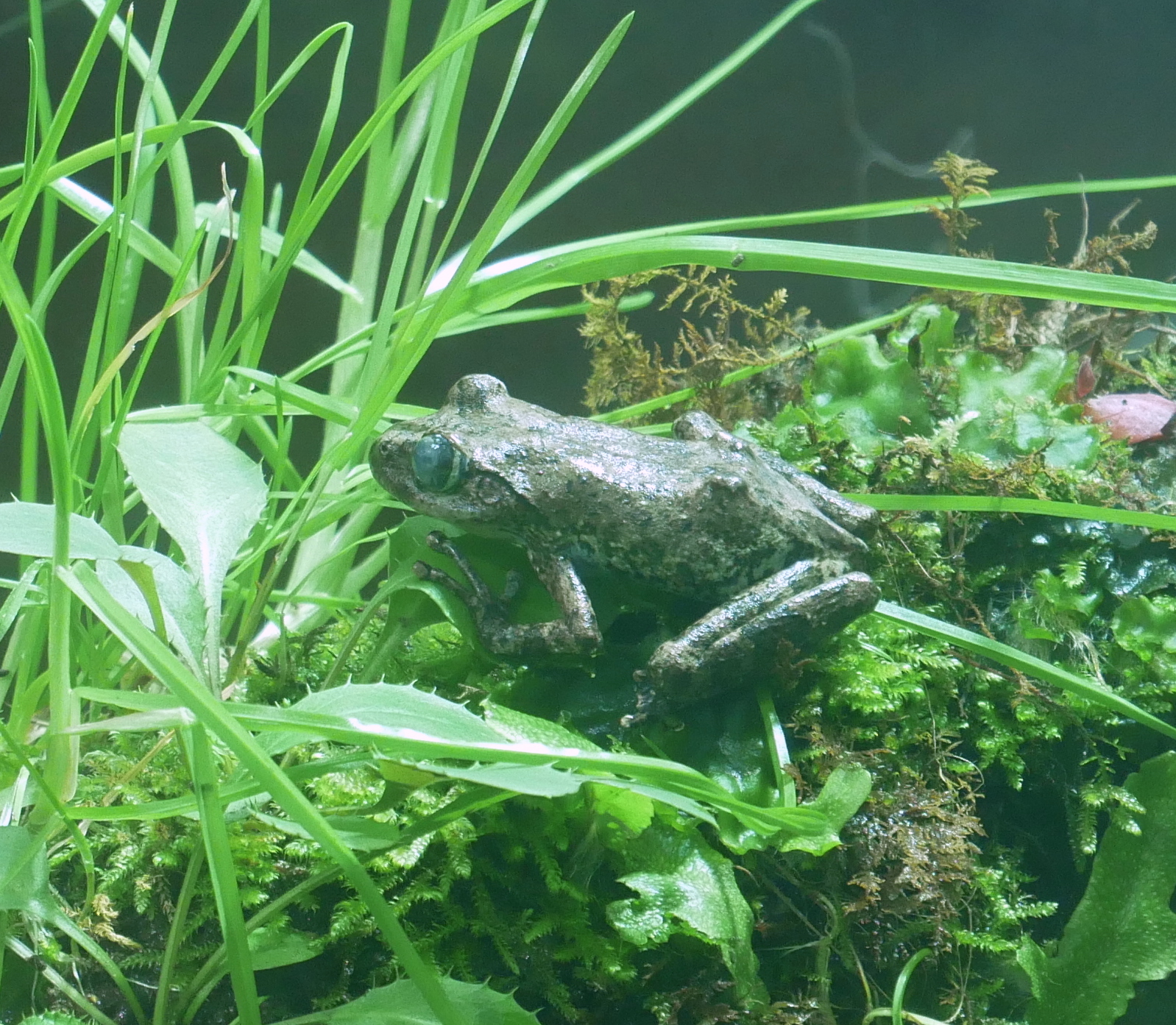

Conservation status
- Least Concern (IUCN 3.1)

Scientific classification
- Kingdom: Animalia
- Phylum: Chordata
- Class: Amphibia
- Order: Anura
- Family: Rhacophoridae
- Genus: Buergeria
- Species: B. buergeri

Binomial name
- Buergeria buergeri (Temminck & Schlegel, 1838)

Synonyms
- Hyla bürgeri Temminck and Schlegel, 1838

Audio

= Kajika frog =

Species of amphibian

The Kajika frog or Buerger's frog (Buergeria buergeri) is a species of frog in the family Rhacophoridae. It is endemic to Japan where it can be found on Honshu, Kyushu, and Shikoku islands. It is locally threatened by habitat loss caused by dam building and construction of concrete riverbanks.

== Description ==
As with other species in the family Rhacophoridae, the female is bigger than the male. Males are 3.5–4.4 cm and females are 4.9–8.5 cm. Their bodies are flat which allows them to easily hide between rocks. They are grayish-brown in color with speckles which makes for protective camouflage on rocks. There is a dark T-shaped pattern between their eyes. They are able to change their shade of color to a certain extent based on their surroundings. There isn't much individual variance in color. Suction pads grow on the tips of their fingers and toes. Their eggs are dark brown with a diameter of 0.2 cm. Their mouths are big and have suction pads that allow them to cling onto rocks in a strong current in order to not get carried away.

Kajika frog, 2018

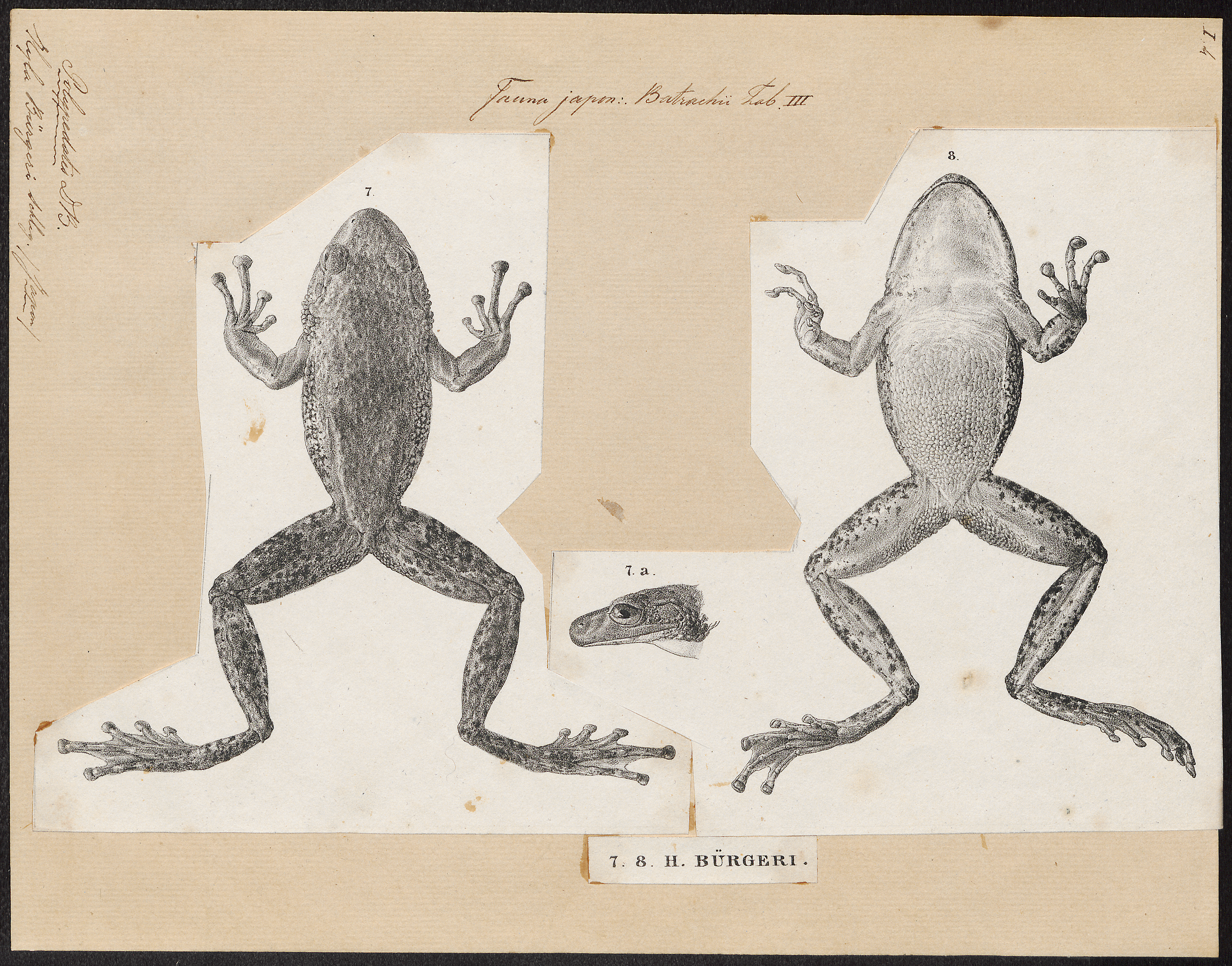
Scientific depiction

== Biology ==
They live in montane streams, lakes, and the surrounding forests. Their diet consists of insects and spiders. The tadpoles eat algae.

The male creates a territory on top of a rock on the riverside and does a mating call. The name "Kajika" (lit. "River Deer") comes from this cry that sounds like the cry of an "Ojika" (buck). Around 500 total eggs are laid across multiple sessions in the water, usually underneath a rock, between the months of April and August. The egg sacks are 5 cm in diameter. The eggs hatch after roughly 2 weeks.

== Relationship with humans ==
Because of their cry they have been the subject of Waka (summer kigo), and in Japanese a person with a beautiful singing voice is referred to as "Kajika".

They are sometimes raised as pets. In the Edo period there were specific "Kajika cages" that were used to raise them.
