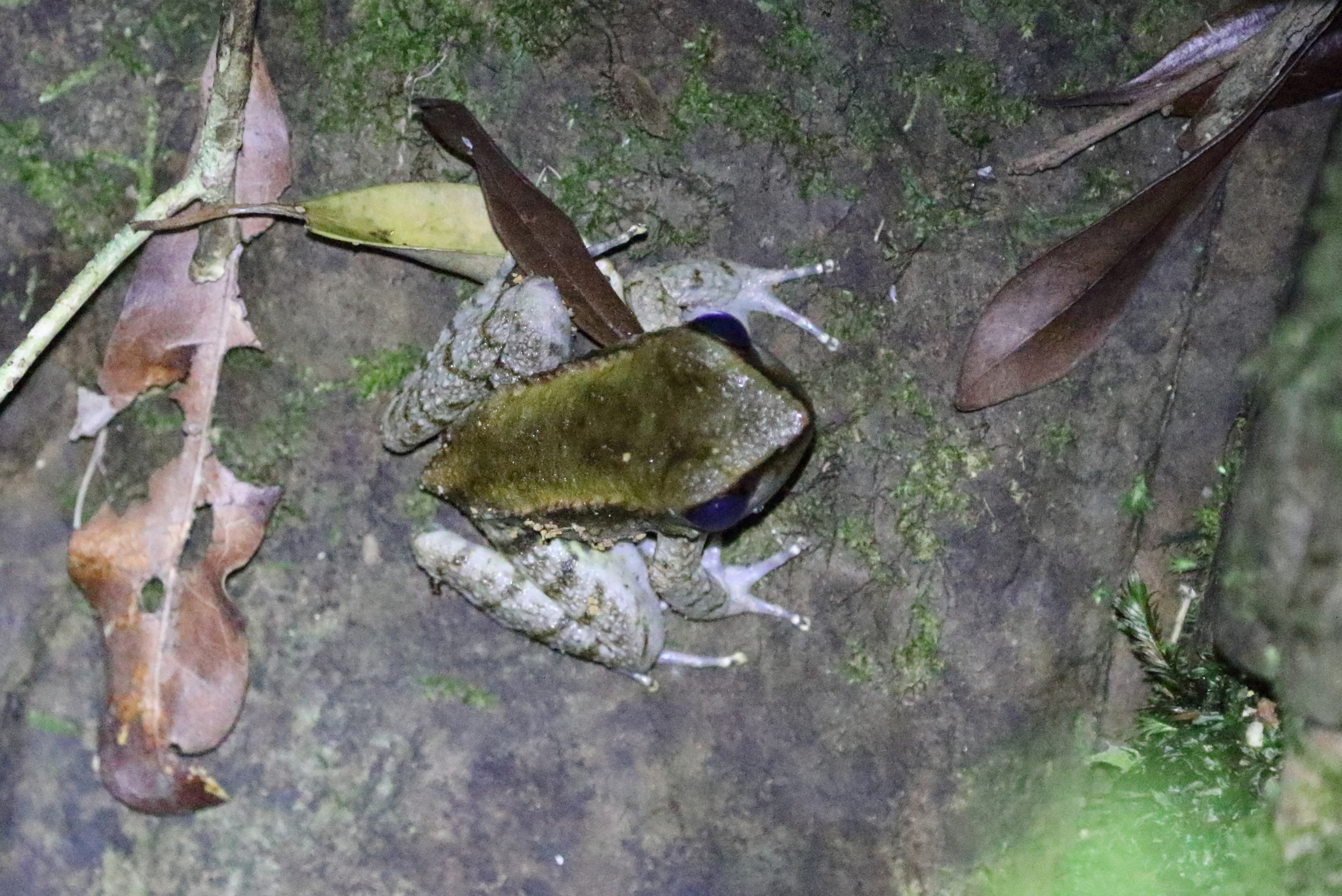
- Babina holsti

Scientific classification
- Domain: Eukaryota
- Kingdom: Animalia
- Phylum: Chordata
- Class: Amphibia
- Order: Anura
- Family: Ranidae
- Genus: Babina; Thompson, 1912

Type species
- Rana holsti Boulenger, 1892

Species
- 2, see text

Synonyms
- Nidirana Dubois, 1992; Dianrana Fei, Ye, and Jiang, 2010

= Babina (frog) =

Genus of amphibians

Babina is a genus of frogs in the family Ranidae from south-eastern and eastern Asia. Formerly, Babina was considered as a subgenus of Rana.

== Species ==
The following species are recognised in the genus Babina:

- Babina holsti (Boulenger, 1892) – Holst's frog
- Babina subaspera (Barbour, 1908) – Otton frog
