= Holst's frog =

Conservation status
- Endangered (IUCN 3.1)

Scientific classification
- Kingdom: Animalia
- Phylum: Chordata
- Class: Amphibia
- Order: Anura
- Family: Ranidae
- Genus: Babina
- Species: B. holsti

Binomial name
- Babina holsti (Boulenger, 1892)

Synonyms
- Rana holsti Boulenger, 1892

Species of amphibian

Holst's frog (Babina holsti) is a species of frog in the family Ranidae. It is endemic to the Ryukyu Islands of Japan. It occurs on mountains of the Okinawa and Tokashiki islands. It lives in primary or recovered secondary broad-leaved evergreen forests. It is threatened by habitat loss caused by road and dam construction.
