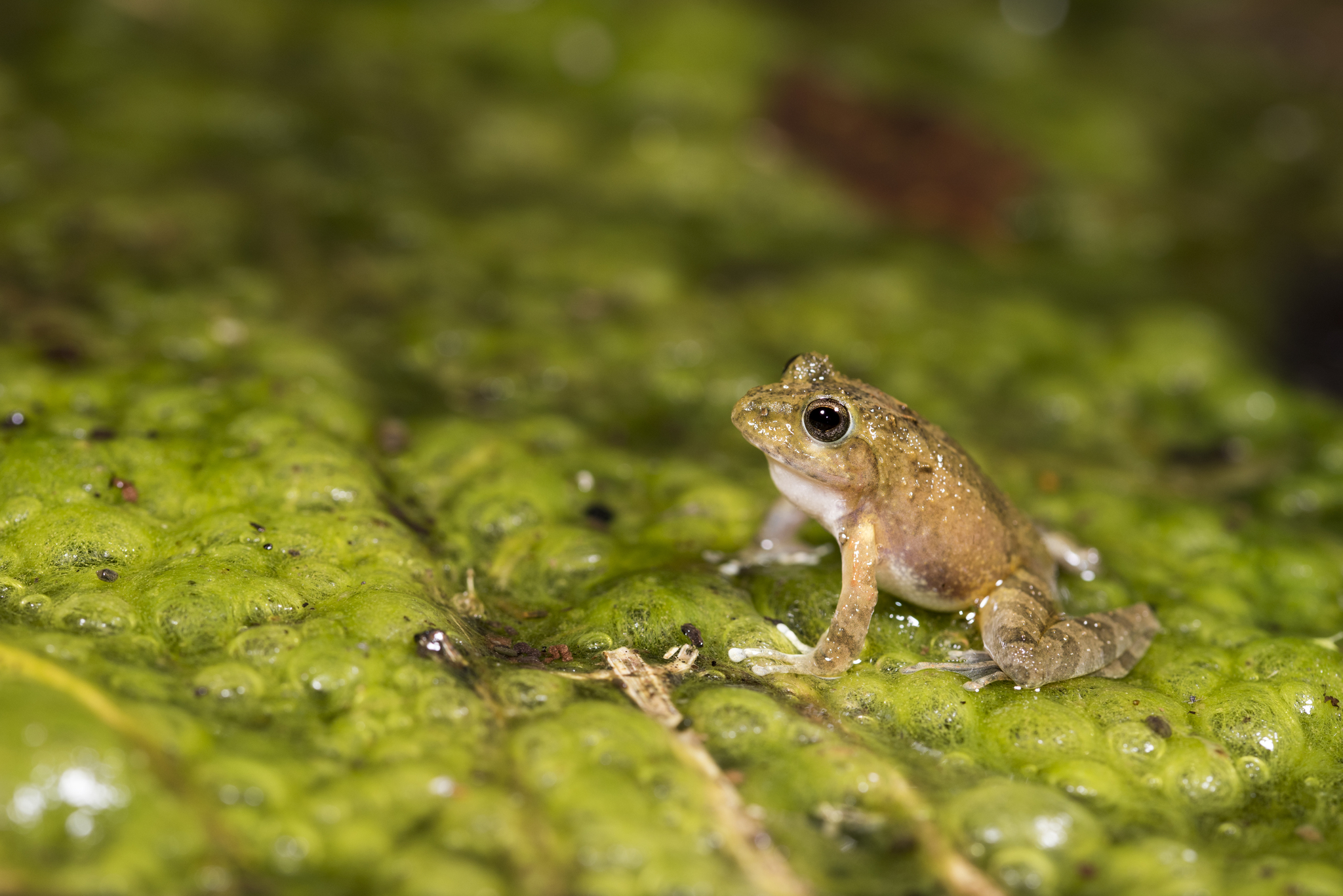

Conservation status
- Least Concern (IUCN 3.1)

Scientific classification
- Kingdom: Animalia
- Phylum: Chordata
- Class: Amphibia
- Order: Anura
- Family: Rhacophoridae
- Genus: Buergeria
- Species: B. choui

Binomial name
- Buergeria choui Matsui and Tominaga, 2020

= Buergeria choui =

Species of frog

Buergeria choui is a species of frog in the family Rhacophoridae. Prior to its description in 2020, it was confused with Buergeria japonica. It is found in northwestern Taiwan and in the southern part of the Ryukyu Archipelago, Japan, specifically on the Yaeyama Islands. Common name Yaeyama Kajika frog has been proposed for it. The specific name choui honors Wen-Hao Chou from the National Museum of Natural Science (Taiwan), the first person to pay attention to the variation within the former Buergeria japonica.

== Distribution ==
Buergeria choui is known from Iriomote and Ishigaki Islands in the Southern Ryukyus and from the northwestern parts of Taiwan. The true Buergeria japonica is now considered a Central and Northern Ryukyus endemic, while the former B. japonica elsewhere in Taiwan are now classified as Buergeria otai.

== Description ==
Adult males measure 25–29 mm (1.0–1.1 in) and adult females 30–36 mm (1.2–1.4 in) in snout–vent length. The snout is truncate. The tympanum is conspicuous; the supratympanic fold is evident. The forelimbs are moderate. The fingers have no webbing but have tips expanded into small discs. The hindlimbs are slender and very long. The toes have fleshy webbing. Skin is dorsally rough with scattered tubercles and ridges. Ground color of the body is highly variable, from yellowish brown and grayish brown to deep brown. There is a dark brown interorbital bar followed by dark cruciform pattern. The throat is creamy yellow. The chest and abdomen are cream. The limbs have dark crossbars. The iris is golden. Males have a single internal subgular vocal sac.

The male advertisement call are emitted in succession and consist of various combinations of notes with various intervals, ranging from a very short ones (including just one pulse) through short trills or whistles to long trills. The long trill lasts 1–2.3 seconds.

Tadpoles of Gosner stages 35–36 measure 26–31 mm (1.0–1.2 in) in total length, of which the lanceolate tail makes about two thirds.

== Habitat ==
Buergeria choui is widely distributed, ranging from coastal lowlands to mountain forests. Breeding takes place in March–November when males can be heard calling near shallow pools, slowly flowing streams, and ditches. The tadpoles are aquatic and tolerate high temperatures. These frogs have been observed between 0 and 1800 meters above sea level.

== Conservation ==
As of late 2020, this species had not yet been assessed for the IUCN Red List of Threatened Species. The former Buergeria japonica was assessed in 2004 as being of "least concern".
