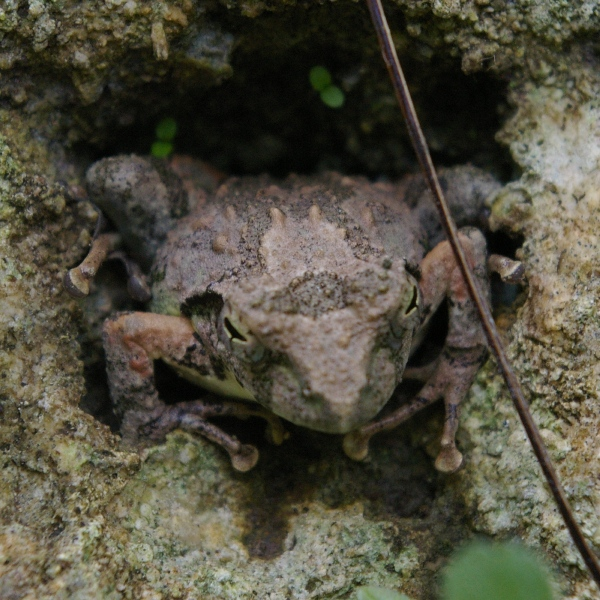

Conservation status
- Least Concern (IUCN 3.1)

Scientific classification
- Kingdom: Animalia
- Phylum: Chordata
- Class: Amphibia
- Order: Anura
- Family: Rhacophoridae
- Genus: Buergeria
- Species: B. japonica

Binomial name
- Buergeria japonica (Hallowell, 1861)

Synonyms
- Ixalus japonicus Hallowell, 1861

= Ryukyu Kajika Frog =

Species of amphibian

The Ryukyu Kajika frog, Japanese Buerger's frog, or Japanese stream treefrog (Buergeria japonica) is a species of frog in the family Rhacophoridae. It is found in the Ryukyu Islands (Japan). Populations from northern Taiwan and the Yaeyama Islands were isolated as a new species(Buergeria choui) in 2020.

== Habitat ==
Buergeria japonica is a common species that occurs in a wide variety of habitats (rivers, intermittent rivers, freshwater marshes, intermittent freshwater marshes, freshwater springs, geothermal wetlands, irrigated land, and canals and ditches). It is locally threatened by habitat loss.

== Description ==
Buergeria japonica is a small to medium-sized frog, about 3 cm (1.2 in) snout-vent length in males.

== Reproduction ==
Buergeria japonica normally breed in slow-moving water in ditches and small streams. However, some Taiwanese populations also breed in geothermal hot springs. In this habitat, frogs can breed throughout the year. Another advantage is that high temperature facilitates growth; furthermore, competition may be reduced in this unusual habitat. Tadpoles can tolerate water temperatures up to about 42 °C (108 °F), however, few tadpoles enter areas of pools where temperature exceeds 37 °C (99 °F).
