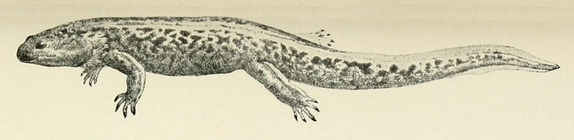

Conservation status
- Least Concern (IUCN 3.1)

Scientific classification
- Kingdom: Animalia
- Phylum: Chordata
- Class: Amphibia
- Order: Urodela
- Family: Hynobiidae
- Genus: Onychodactylus
- Species: O. japonicus

Binomial name
- Onychodactylus japonicus (Houttuyn, 1782)

= Japanese clawed salamander =

Species of salamander

The Japanese clawed salamander (Onychodactylus japonicus) is a species of salamander in the family Hynobiidae, endemic to Japan. Its natural habitats are temperate forests and rivers. The species, which is about 4 to 7 inches in length, is characterized by its thin brown skin with an orange patterned stripe along its back, as well as orange spots on their heads and on top of their legs. The diet of this species includes a variety of aquatic invertebrates such as clams, snails, and shrimp, while adult individuals also consume terrestrial invertebrates like worms, spiders, and flies.
