= Chiala mountain salamander =

Conservation status
- Vulnerable (IUCN 3.1)

Scientific classification
- Kingdom: Animalia
- Phylum: Chordata
- Class: Amphibia
- Order: Urodela
- Family: Hynobiidae
- Genus: Batrachuperus
- Species: B. karlschmidti

Binomial name
- Batrachuperus karlschmidti Liu, 1950

Species of amphibian

The Chiala mountain salamander (Batrachuperus karlschmidti) is a species of salamander in the family Hynobiidae endemic to China and known from northwestern Sichuan, northeastern Tibet, and southeastern Gansu. Its validity as a species distinct from Batrachuperus tibetanus has been controversial. It is named after Karl Patterson Schmidt, American herpetologist.

The species' natural habitat are slow-flowing streams in grassland areas. It is largely aquatic but can occasionally be found on the stream bank. It is threatened by habitat loss caused by overgrazing as well as by collecting for traditional medicine.
