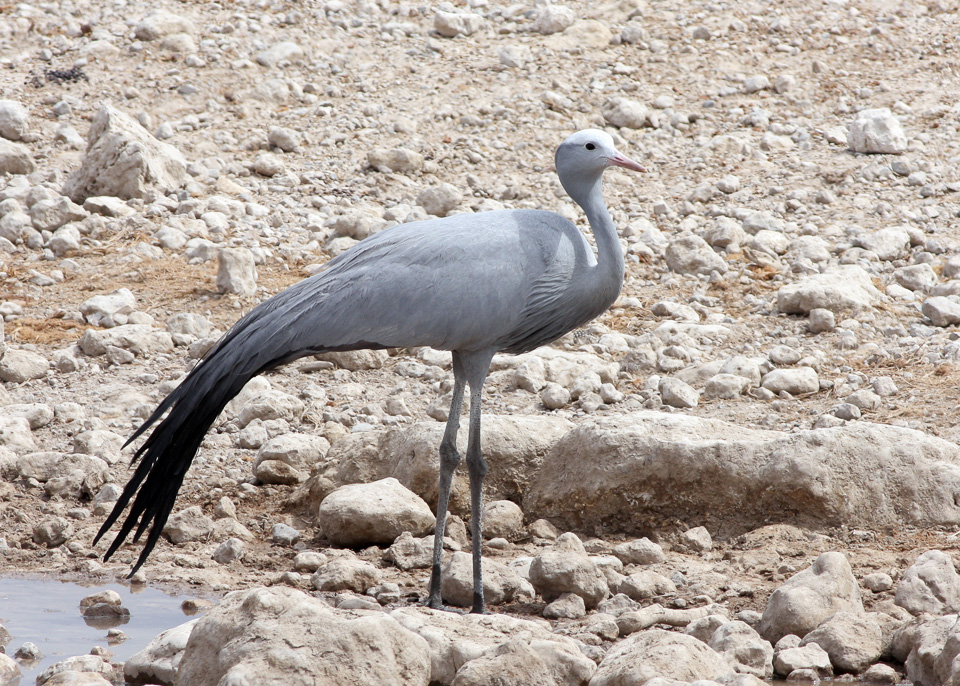
- At Etosha National Park, Namibia

Conservation status
- Vulnerable (IUCN 3.1)
- CITES Appendix II

Scientific classification
- Kingdom: Animalia
- Phylum: Chordata
- Class: Aves
- Order: Gruiformes
- Family: Gruidae
- Genus: Grus
- Species: G. paradisea

Binomial name
- Grus paradisea (Lichtenstein, AAH, 1793) [originally Ardea]
- Blue crane distribution range according to the IUCN. Extant (resident) Extant (seasonality uncertain)

Synonyms
- Anthropoides paradiseus (Lichtenstein, 1793); Ardea paradisea Lichtenstein, AAH, 1793; Tetrapteryx capensis Thunberg, 1818; Anthropoides stanleyanus Vigors, 1826; Scops paradisea Gray, GR, 1840; Geranus paradisea Bonaparte, 1854; Grus caffra Fritsch, 1868; Anthropoides paradisea Dowsett and Forbes-Watson, 1993

= Blue crane =

Species of bird from southern Africa

The blue crane (Grus paradisea), also known as the Stanley crane and the paradise crane, is the national bird of South Africa. The species is listed as Vulnerable by the IUCN.

== Description ==
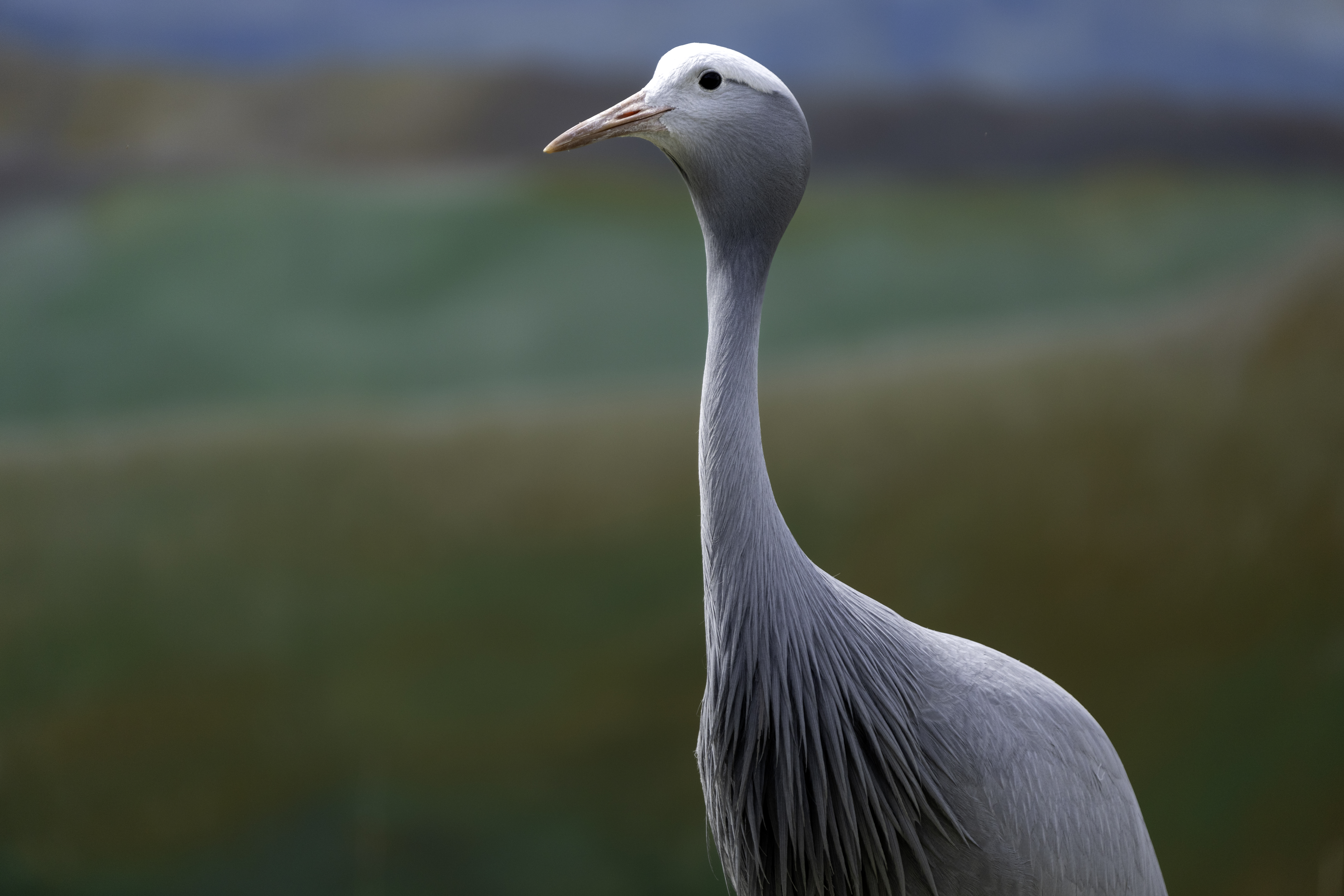
A blue crane at the International Crane Foundation

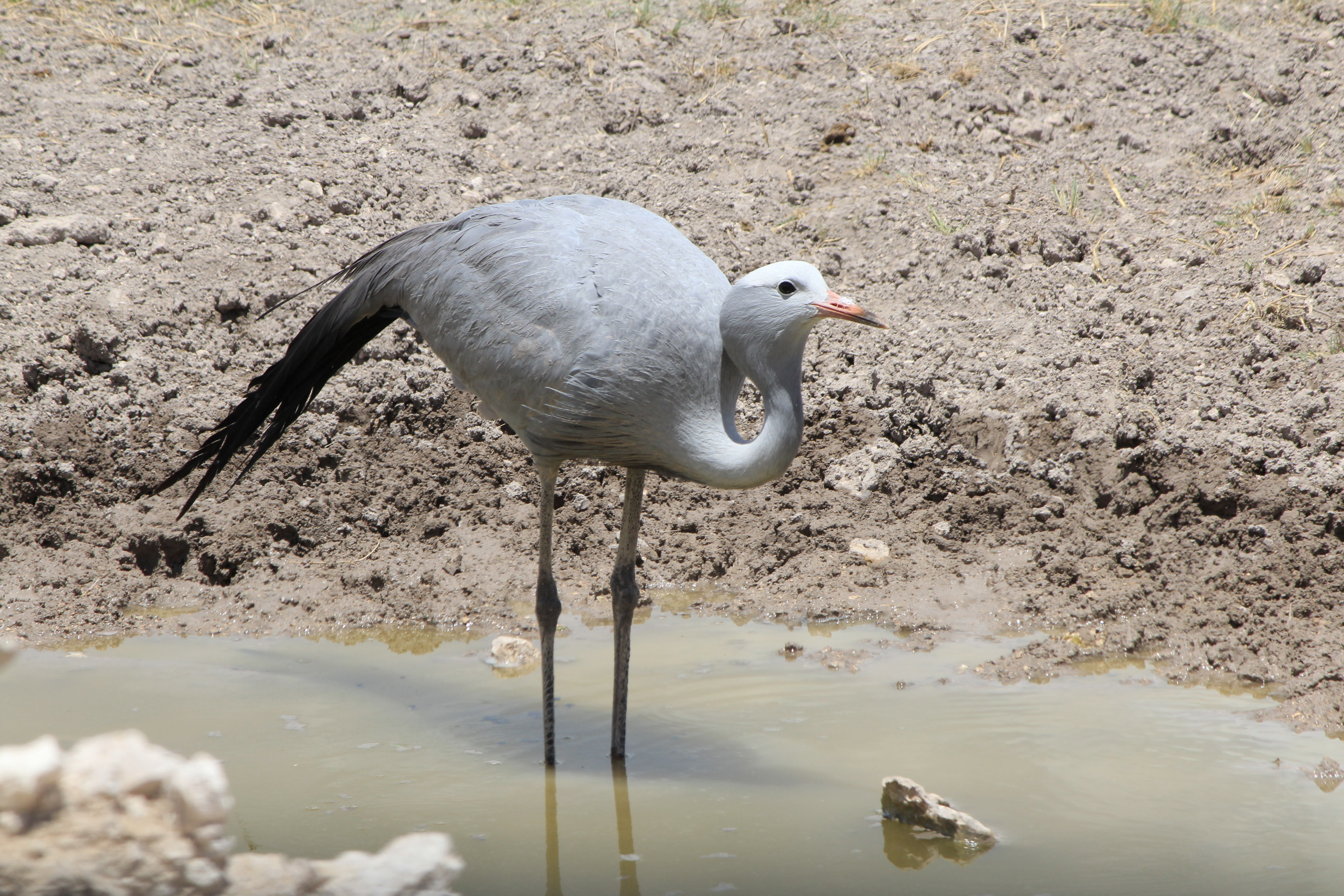
Blue crane seen in Etosha, Namibia

The blue crane is a tall, ground-dwelling bird, but is fairly small by the standards of the crane family. It is 100–120 cm (3 ft 3 in – 3 ft 11 in) tall, with a wingspan of 180–200 cm (5 ft 11 in – 6 ft 7 in) and weighs 3.6–6.2 kg (7.9–13.7 lb). Among standard measurements, the wing chord measures 51.4–59 cm (20.2–23.2 in), the exposed culmen measures 8–10 cm (3.1–3.9 in) and the tarsus measures 20.5–25.2 cm (8.1–9.9 in). This crane is pale blue-gray in color becoming darker on the upper head, neck and nape. From the crown to the lores, the plumage is distinctly lighter, sometimes whitish. The bill is ochre to greyish, with a pink tinge. The long wingtip feathers which trail to the ground. The primaries are black to slate grey, with dark coverts and blackish on the secondaries. Unlike most cranes, it has a relatively large head and a proportionately thin neck. Juveniles are similar but slightly lighter, with tawny coloration on the head, and no long wing plumes.

== Habitat ==
Blue cranes are birds of the dry grassy uplands, usually the pastured grasses of hills, valleys, and plains with a few scattered trees. They prefer areas in the nesting season that have access to both upland and wetland areas, though they feed almost entirely in dry areas. They are altitudinal migrants, generally nesting in the lower grasslands of an elevation of around 1,300 to 2,000 m and moving down to lower altitudes for winter.

== Movements and behaviour ==
Of the 15 species of crane, the blue crane has the most restricted distribution of all. Even species with lower population numbers now (such as Siberian or whooping cranes) are found over a considerable range in their migratory movements. The blue crane is migratory, primarily altitudinal, but details are little known.

The blue crane is partially social, less so during the breeding season. There is a strict hierarchy in groups, with the larger adult males being dominant. They overlap in range with three other crane species but interactions with these species and other "large wader" type birds are not known. They are aggressively protective of their nesting sites during the nesting season, even attacking innocent, non-predatory animals such as antelope, cattle, tortoises, plovers and the smallest of birds, such as sparrows. Humans are also attacked if they approach a nest too closely, with the aggressive male having torn clothes and drawn blood in such cases. Threats to their eggs and chicks include large savannah and white-throated monitor lizards, egg-eating snakes, foxes, jackals, birds-of-prey, meerkats, and mongoose.

== Feeding ==
Blue cranes feed from the ground and appear to rarely feed near wetland areas. Most of their diet is comprised by grasses and sedges, with many types fed on based on their proximity to the nests. They are also regularly insectivorous, feeding on numerous, sizeable insects such as grasshoppers. Small animals such as crabs, snails, frogs, small lizards and snakes may supplement the diet, with such protein-rich food often being broken down and fed to the young.

== Breeding ==
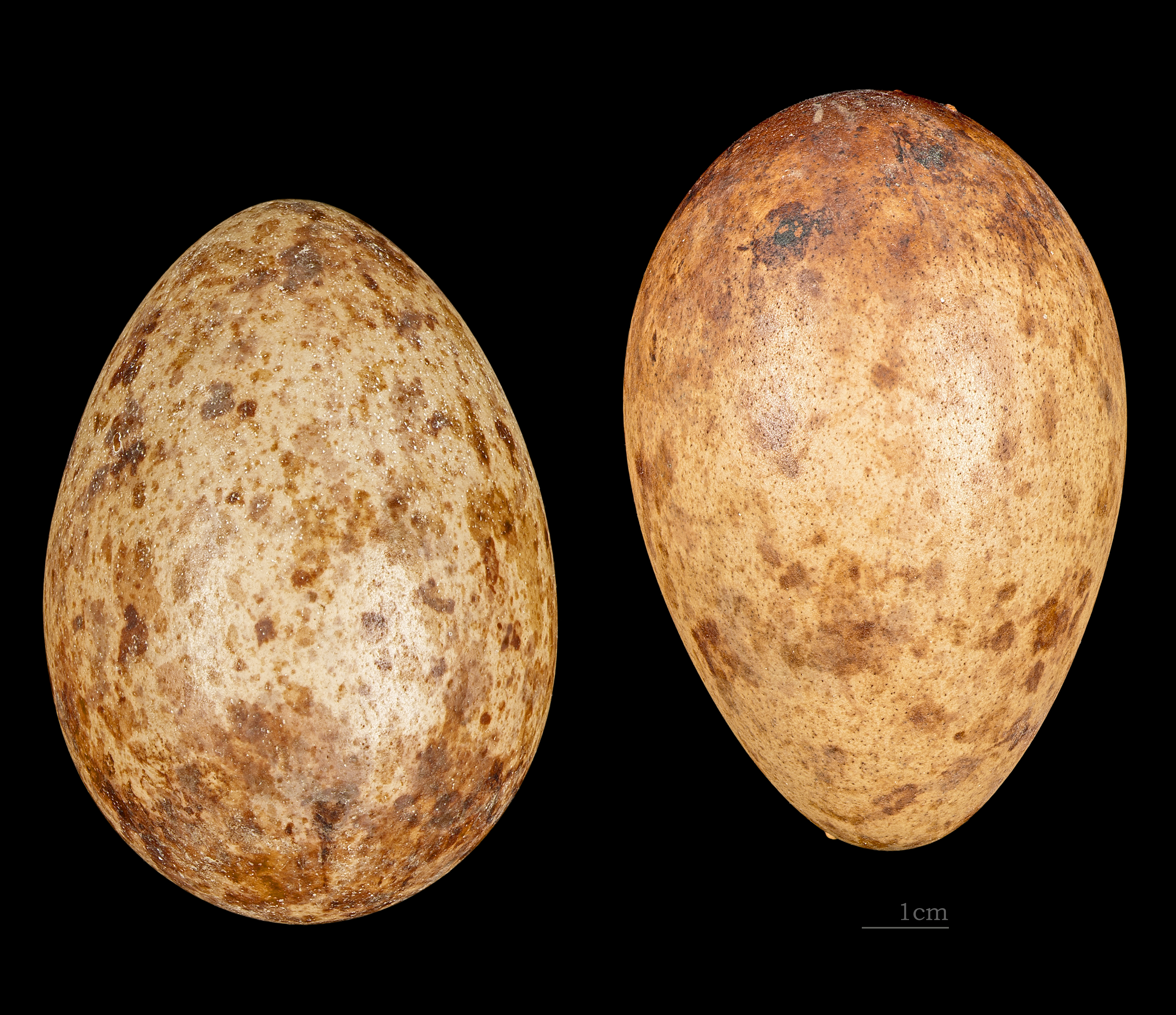
Eggs of Blue Crane MHNT

The breeding period is highly seasonal, with eggs being recorded between October and March. Pair-formation amongst groups often starts in October, beginning with both potential parents running in circles with each other. The male then engages in a "dance" flings various objects in the air and then jumps. Eventually, a female from the group and the male appear to "select" each other and both engage in the dance of throwing objects and jumping. After the dance, mating commences in around two weeks.

In a great majority of known nests, two eggs are laid (rarely one or three). Both males and females will incubate, with the male often incubating at night and, during the day, defending the nest territory while the female incubates. The incubation stage lasts around 30 days. The young are able to walk after two days and can swim well shortly thereafter. They are fed primarily by their mothers, who regurgitates food into the mouths. The chicks fledge in the age of 3–5 months. The young continue to be tended to until the next breeding season, at which time they are chased off by their parents.

== Decline ==
While it remains common in parts of its historic range, and approx. 26 000 individuals remain, it began a sudden population decline from around 1980 and is now classified as vulnerable.

In the last two decades, the blue crane has largely disappeared from the Eastern Cape, Lesotho, and Eswatini. The population in the northern Free State, Limpopo, Gauteng, Mpumalanga and North West Province has declined by up to 90%. The majority of the remaining population is in eastern and southern South Africa, with a small and separate population in the Etosha Pan of northern Namibia. Occasionally, isolated breeding pairs are found in five neighbouring countries.

The primary causes of the sudden decline of the blue crane are human population growth, the conversion of grasslands into commercial tree plantations, and poisoning: deliberate (to protect crops) or accidental (baits intended for other species, and as a side-effect of crop dusting).

The South African government has stepped up legal protection for the blue crane. Other conservation measures are focusing on research, habitat management, education, and recruiting the help of private landowners.

The blue crane is one of the species to which the Agreement on the Conservation of African-Eurasian Migratory Waterbirds (AEWA) applies.

Since October 2021, the Blue Crane has been classified as Moderately Depleted by the IUCN.

== Cultural references ==
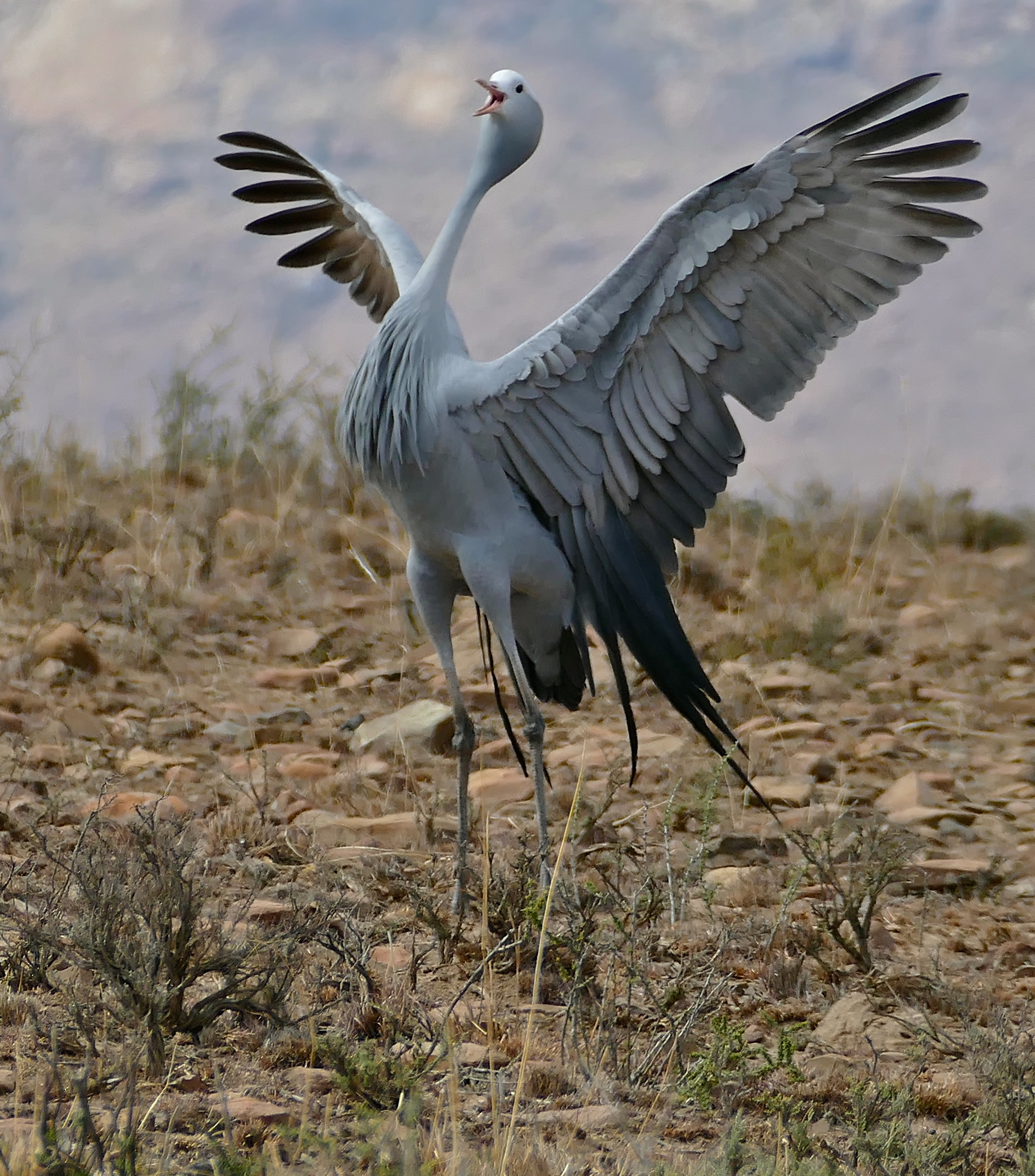

The blue crane is culturally significant to the Xhosa people, who call it indwe (flag). Traditionally, when a man distinguished himself in battle or otherwise, he was often decorated by a chief with blue crane feathers in a ceremony called ukundzabela. Men so honoured, who would wear the feathers sticking out of their hair, were known as men of ugaba (trouble)—the implication being that if trouble arose, they would reinstate peace and order.

It is also of significance to the Zulu people, whose kings and warriors wore a single or many feathers as a headdress.

Because of the association with warriors and heroism, the Isitwalandwe Medal was created to honour those who had "made an outstanding contribution and sacrifice to the liberation struggle", that is, those who resisted the apartheid regime in South Africa (1949–1991) in various ways. Isitwalandwe means "the one who wears the plumes of the rare bird", or blue crane.

The blue crane is also the national bird of South Africa.
