= Tetrapteryx =

Tetrapteryx may refer to:

- Tetrapteryx capensis, junior synonym of Anthropoides paradiseus, the blue crane
- The Tetrapteryx stage, a theoretical stage in the evolution of bird flight proposed by William Beebe
