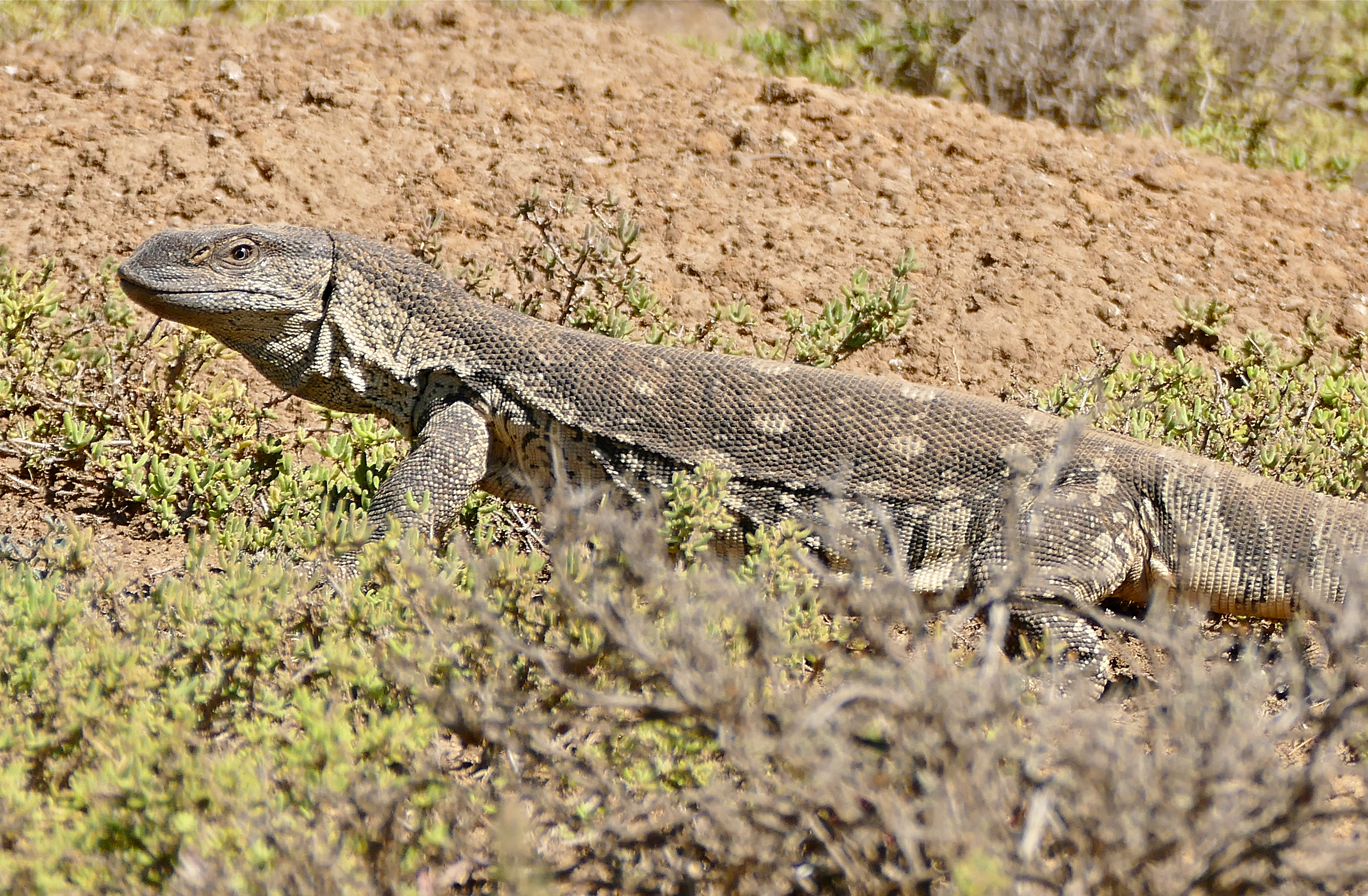
- White-throated monitor at Mountain Zebra National Park, South Africa

Conservation status
- Least Concern (IUCN 3.1)
- CITES Appendix II

Scientific classification
- Kingdom: Animalia
- Phylum: Chordata
- Class: Reptilia
- Order: Squamata
- Suborder: Anguimorpha
- Family: Varanidae
- Genus: Varanus
- Subgenus: Polydaedalus
- Species: V. albigularis

Binomial name
- Varanus albigularis (Daudin, 1802)

Synonyms
- List: Tupinambis albigularis Daudin, 1802; Tupinambis indicus Daudin, 1802; Monitor albigularis — Gray, 1831; Varanus albogularis — A.M.C. Duméril & Bibron, 1836; Regenia albogularis — Günther, 1861; Varanus albigularis — Boulenger, 1885; Varanus exanthematicus albigularis — Schmidt, 1919; Varanus exanthematicus ionidesii — Raymond Ferdinand Laurent, 1964; Varanus albigularis — Böhme, 1988

= Rock monitor =

Species of reptile

The rock monitor (Varanus albigularis) is a species of monitor lizard in the family Varanidae. The species is endemic to Sub-Saharan Africa, where, on average, it is the largest lizard found on the continent. It is called leguaan or likkewaan in some areas.

== Taxonomy ==
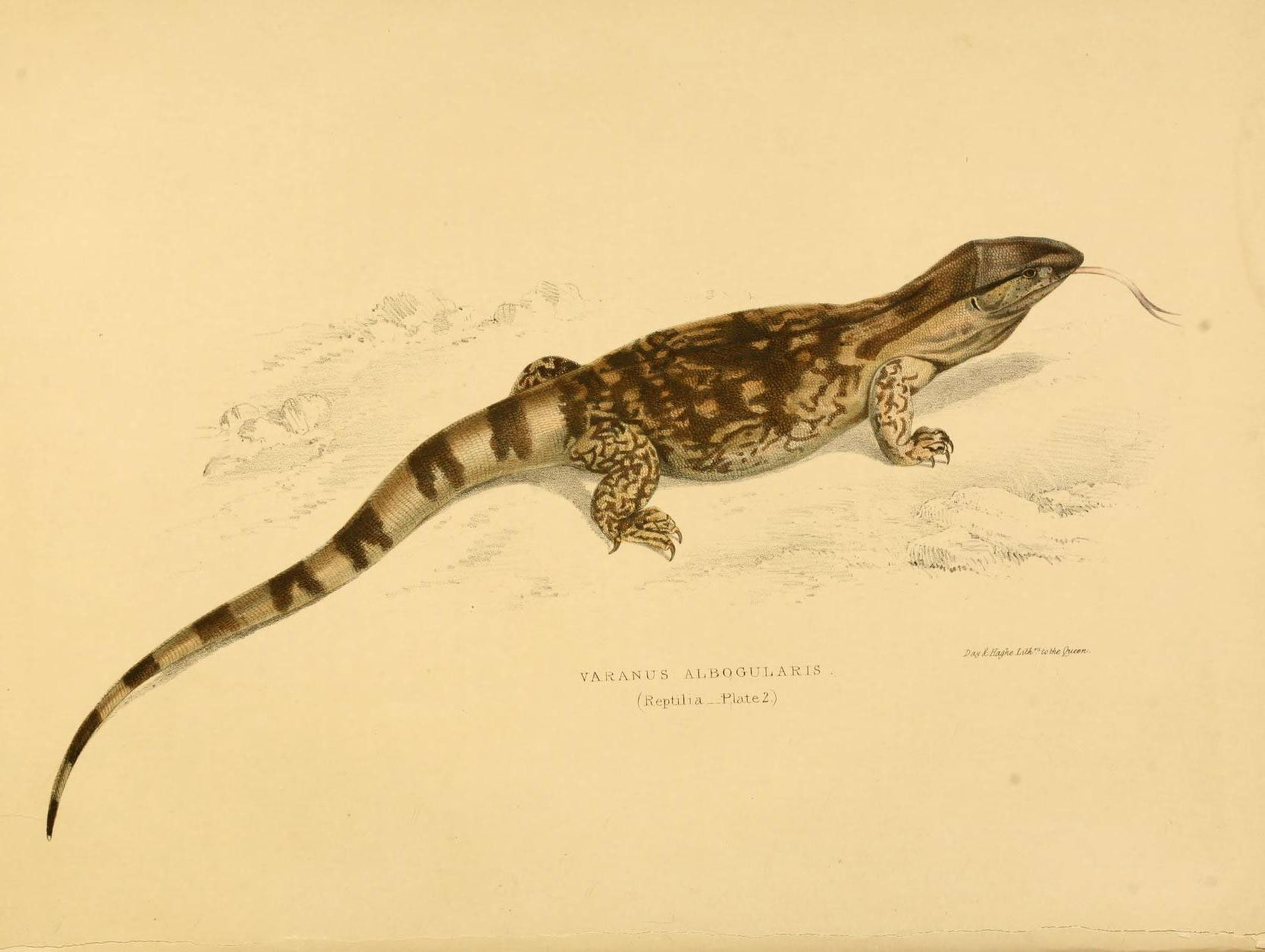
V. albigularis

First described by François Marie Daudin in 1802, V. albigularis had been classified as a subspecies of V. exanthematicus, but has since been declared a distinct species based on differences in hemipenal morphology. The generic name Varanus is derived from the Arabic word waral ورل (English: "monitor"). The specific name albigularis comes from a compound of two Latin words, albus (meaning "white") and gula ("throat").

Subspecies of V. albigularis are:

- White-throated monitor, V. a. albigularis
- Angolan white-throated monitor, V. a. angolensis
- Eastern white-throated monitor, V. a. microstictus
- Black-throated monitor, V. a. ionidesi (but may be synonymous with V. a. microstictus)

== Description ==
Varanus albigularis is on average the most massive lizard in Africa, as adult males average about 6 to 8 kg (13 to 18 lb) and females weigh from 3.2 to 5 kg (7.1 to 11.0 lb). Large mature males can attain weights of 15 to 17 kg (33 to 37 lb), which would make it slightly smaller than the Nile monitor by maximum size. It is the second longest African lizard after the Nile monitor. Mature specimens typically measure 0.85 to 1.5 meters (2 ft 9 in to 4 ft 11 in). The head and neck are the same length, and are distinct from each other. The bulbous, convex snout gives an angular, box-like appearance. The forked tongue is pink or bluish, and the body scales are usually a mottled gray-brown with yellowish or white markings. Exceptionally large specimens reach 2 meters (6 ft 7 in) in total length (including tail), with its tail and body being of equal size.

== Geographic range and habitat ==
V. albigularis is found in Central Africa (Democratic Republic of the Congo/Zaire), Southern Africa (Namibia, Botswana, Republic of South Africa, Eswatini, Zimbabwe, Mozambique, Zambia, Angola), East Africa and the African Great Lakes region (Burundi, Kenya, Uganda, Tanzania), and the Horn of Africa (Ethiopia, Somalia). V. albigularis is found in a variety of arid habitats, including steppes, grasslands and savanna, and may frequent rock kopje (inselbergs) formations that dot the landscape. They are generally absent from desert interiors, rainforests and thick scrub forests.

== Diet ==
V. albigularis are generalists, feeding opportunistically on a broad variety of prey in the wild, such as other lizards, amphibians, birds, snakes, tortoises, eggs and small mammals. Tortoises make up a significant part of their diet, and are swallowed whole due to the hard shell. Otherwise, this species consumes very little vertebrate prey, eating primarily invertebrates, especially millipedes, beetles, molluscs, orthopterans and scorpions. Millipedes for example form nearly a quarter of their diet; the monitors are apparently resistant to its poisonous secretions. They are not averse to occasionally scavenging the corpses of vertebrate prey, even those as large as vervet monkeys, which are sometimes torn to pieces by "death rolling" like a crocodilian prior to consumption. Live vertebrate prey other than tortoises are usually too fast to catch for these monitors, and therefore form very little of their diet. This contrasts with what is often a diet of mostly vertebrates in captivity, such as rodents, poultry or fish.

== Predators ==
Natural predators of adult rock monitors include martial eagles and leopards.

== Intelligence ==
An intelligent lizard, several specimens of V. albigularis have demonstrated the ability to count as high as six in an experiment conducted by Dr. John Philips at the San Diego Zoo in 1999. Philips offered varying numbers of snails, and the monitors were able to distinguish numbers whenever one was missing.

== Folklore ==
People living with the HIV/AIDS virus in Yumbe District of Uganda have been reported injecting themselves with the blood of rock monitors, which they believe to be a cure for the virus. Many are reportedly discontinuing anti-retroviral therapy to pursue this anecdotal treatment.

As a result, V. albigularis is reported to have become an expensive item in the Ugandan black market, selling for more than 175 US$ each.
