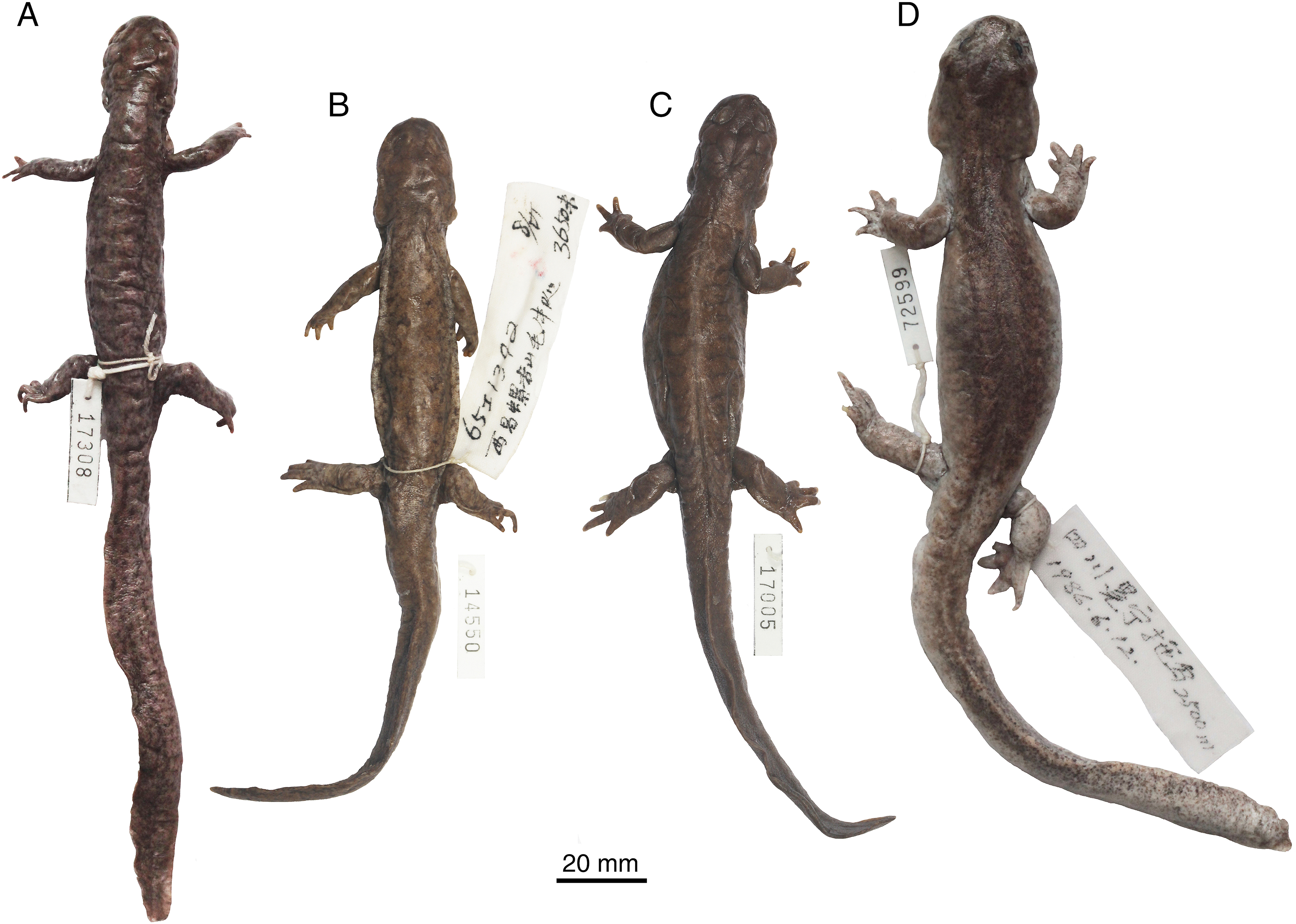
- Four preserved Batrachuperus yenyuanensis

Conservation status
- Endangered (IUCN 3.1)

Scientific classification
- Kingdom: Animalia
- Phylum: Chordata
- Class: Amphibia
- Order: Urodela
- Family: Hynobiidae
- Genus: Batrachuperus
- Species: B. yenyuanensis

Binomial name
- Batrachuperus yenyuanensis Liu, 1950

= Yenyuan stream salamander =

Species of amphibian

The Yenyuan stream salamander (Batrachuperus yenyuanensis) is a species of salamander in the family Hynobiidae endemic to Sichuan, China, where it occurs in Yanyuan, Xichang, Mianning, and Puxiong counties. Its natural habitats are rivers, freshwater lakes, and freshwater marshes. It is a high-altitude salamander, typically inhabiting the waterways along the eastern edge of the Qinghai-Tibetan Plateau at altitudes 2440 to 4025 meters above sea level. Adults eat a diet consisting mainly of insects and shrimp, and to a lesser degree, algae and seeds. It is threatened by habitat loss.
