= Karl Patterson Schmidt =

American herpetologist (1890–1957)

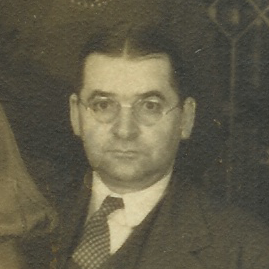
- c. 1950
- Born: June 19, 1890; Lake Forest, Illinois, U.S.
- Died: September 26, 1957 (aged 67); Chicago, Illinois, U.S.
- Cause of death: Snakebite
- Education: Lake Forest Academy, Cornell University
- Spouse: Margaret Wightman (m. 1919)
- Children: 2
- Awards: Guggenheim Fellowship (1932), elected to National Academy of Sciences (1956), Ecological Society of America Eminent Ecologist (1957)
- Scientific career
- Fields: Biology, Herpetology, Animal geographies
- Workplaces: American Museum of Natural History, Field Museum of Natural History
- Notable students: Robert F. Inger
- Author abbrev. (zoology): K. P. Schmidt

Karl Patterson Schmidt (June 19, 1890 – September 26, 1957) was an American herpetologist.

== Family ==
Schmidt was the son of George W. Schmidt and Margaret Patterson Schmidt. George W. Schmidt was a German professor who, at the time of Karl Schmidt's birth, was teaching in Lake Forest, Illinois. His family left the city in 1907 and settled in Wisconsin. They worked on a farm near Stanley, Wisconsin, where his mother and his younger brother died in a fire on August 7, 1935. The brother, Franklin J. W. Schmidt, had been prominent in the then-new field of wildlife management. Karl Schmidt married Margaret Wightman in 1919, and they had two sons, John and Robert.

== Education ==
In 1913, Schmidt entered Cornell University to study biology and geology. In 1915, he discovered his preference for herpetology during a four-month training course at the Perdee Oil Company in Louisiana. In 1916, he received the degree of Bachelor of Arts and made his first geological expedition to Santo Domingo. In 1952 he was awarded an honorary Doctor of Science degree by Earlham College.

== Career ==
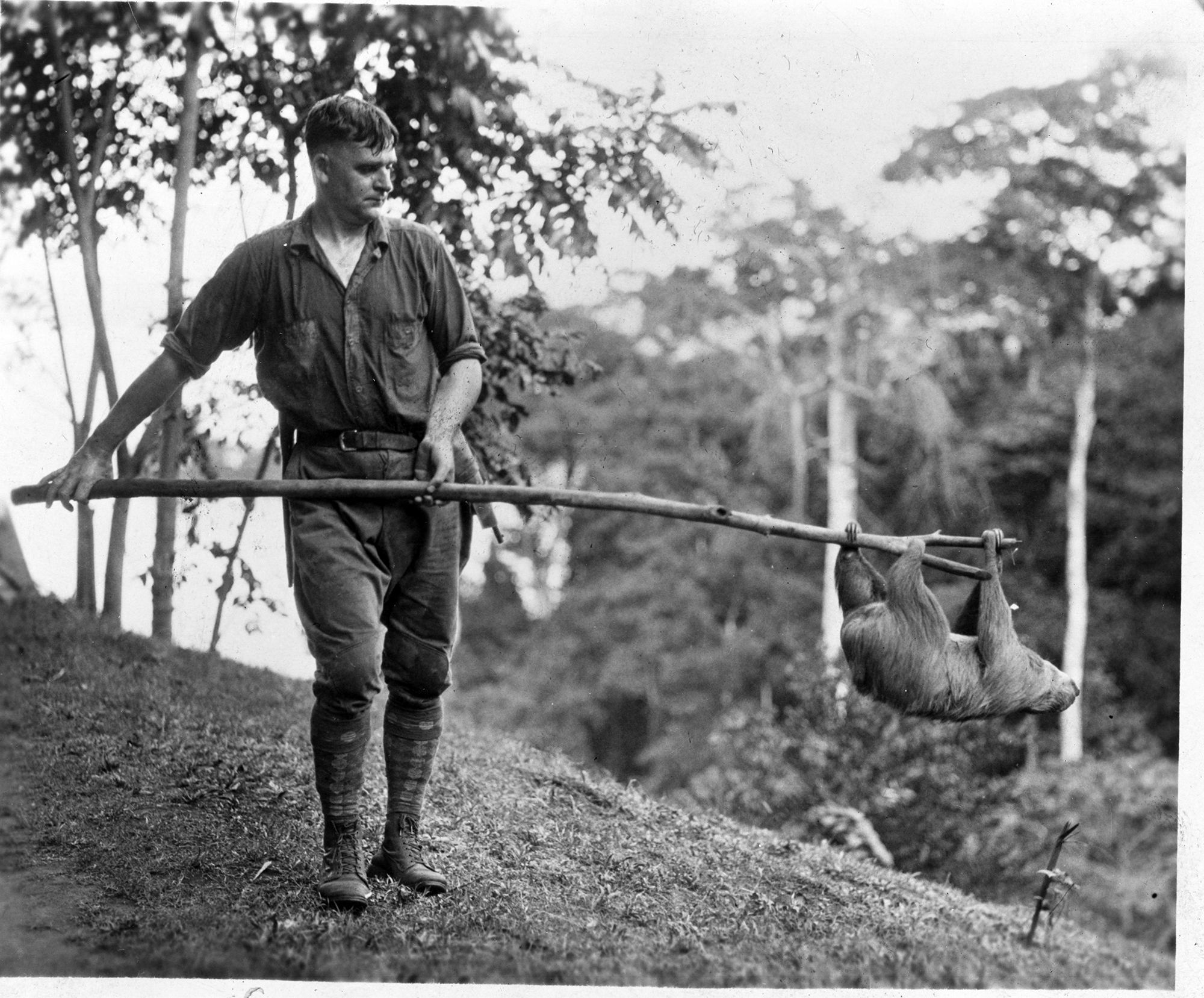
Schmidt in 1929 with a two-toed sloth

From 1916 to 1922, he worked as a scientific assistant in herpetology at the American Museum of Natural History in New York, under the well-known American herpetologists Mary Cynthia Dickerson and Gladwyn K. Noble. He made his first collecting expedition to Puerto Rico in 1919, then became the assistant curator of reptiles and amphibians at the Field Museum of Natural History in Chicago in 1922. From 1923 to 1934, he made several collecting expeditions for that museum to Central and South America, which took him to Honduras (1923), Brazil (1926) and Guatemala (1933–1934). In 1937, he became the editor of the herpetology and ichthyology journal Copeia, a post he occupied until 1949. In 1938, he served in the U.S. Army. He became the chief curator of zoology at the Field Museum in 1941, where he remained until his retirement in 1955. From 1942 to 1946, he was the president of the American Society of Ichthyologists and Herpetologists. In 1953, he made his last expedition, which was to Israel.

== Death ==
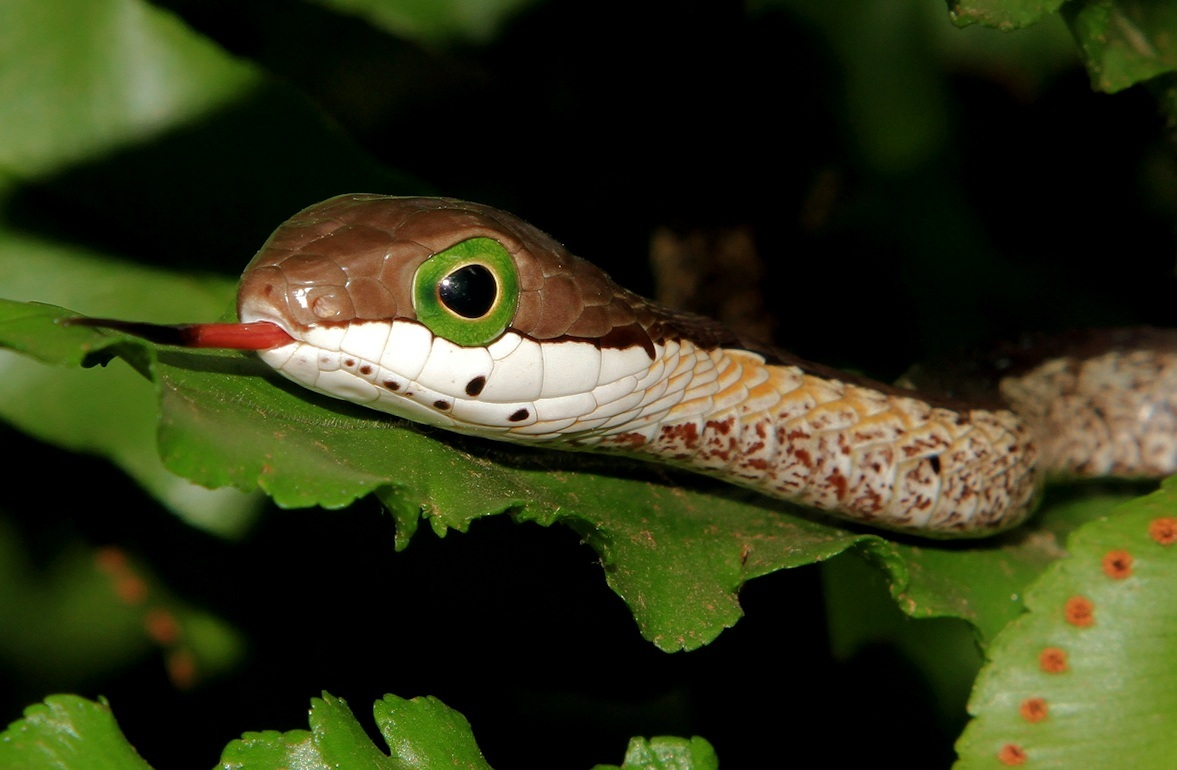
Schmidt died after being bitten by a juvenile boomslang snake.

On September 26, 1957, Schmidt was bitten by a juvenile boomslang snake (Dispholidus typus) at his lab at the Field Museum. Marlin Perkins, the director of the Lincoln Park Zoo, had sent the snake to Schmidt's lab for identification. Schmidt wrongly believed that the snake could not produce a fatal dose because of its age and the fact that boomslangs are rear-fanged. The bite occurred because he held the snake in an unsafe manner, "too far behind the head." Boomslang venom causes disseminated intravascular coagulation, a condition in which so many small clots form in the blood that the victim loses the ability to clot further and bleeds to death.

Later that evening, Schmidt felt slightly ill. By the next morning, the lethal effects of the venom rapidly became evident. He did not report to work, and at noon, he reported to the museum that he was very ill. Following the bite, he took detailed notes on the symptoms that he experienced, almost until death. He collapsed at his home in Homewood, Illinois, bleeding in his lungs, kidneys, heart, and brain, and was dead on arrival at Ingalls Memorial Hospital.

== Legacy ==
Schmidt was one of the most important herpetologists in the 20th century. Though he made only a few important discoveries by himself, he named more than 200 species and was a leading expert on coral snakes. His donation of over 15,000 titles of herpetological literature formed the foundation for The Karl P. Schmidt Memorial Herpetological Library located at the Field Museum.

His writings reveal that he was generally a solid supporter of a W. D. Matthew brand of dispersalism of species.

== Taxa ==
=== Species and subspecies named for him ===
Many species and subspecies of amphibians and reptiles are named in his honor, including:

- Acanthodactylus schmidti Haas, 1957
- Afrotyphlops schmidti (Laurent, 1956)
- Amphisbaena schmidti Gans, 1964
- Aspidoscelis hyperythra schmidti Van Denburgh & Slevin, 1921
- Batrachuperus karlschmidti C.-c. Liu, 1950
- Calamaria schmidti Marx & Inger, 1955
- Coniophanes schmidti Bailey, 1937
- Eleutherodactylus karlschmidti C. Grant, 1931
- Emoia schmidti W. Brown, 1954
- Lerista karlschmidti (Marx & Hosmer, 1959)
- Liolaemus schmidti (Marx, 1960)
- Pseudoxenodon karlschmidti Pope, 1928
- Scincella schmidti Barbour, 1927
- Thrasops schmidti Loveridge, 1936
- Tribolonotus schmidti Burt, 1930
- Urosaurus ornatus schmidti (Mittleman, 1940)
- Varanus karlschmidti Mertens, 1951

=== Some taxa described by him ===
- Batrachuperus tibetanus K.P. Schmidt, 1929
- Eleutherodactylus wightmanae K.P. Schmidt, 1920
- Varanus albigularis angolensis K.P. Schmidt, 1933
- Leptopelis parvus K.P. Schmidt & Inger, 1959
- Neurergus kaiseri K.P. Schmidt, 1952

== Publications ==
He wrote more than two hundred articles and books, including Living Reptiles of the World, which became an international bestseller.

=== Books ===
- 1933 – Amphibians and Reptiles Collected by The Smithsonian Biological Survey of the Panama Canal Zone
- 1934 – Homes and Habits of Wild Animals
- 1938 – Our Friendly Animals and When They Came
- 1941 – Field Book of Snakes of the United States and Canada with Delbert Dwight Davis
- 1949 – Principles of Animal Ecology with Warder Clyde Allee (1885–1955) and Alfred Edwards Emerson
- 1951 – Ecological Animal Geography: An Authorized, Rewritten edition with Warder Clyde Allee, based on Tiergeographie auf oekologischer Grundlage by Richard Hesse. 2nd, John Wiley & Sons, New York
- 1953 – A Check List of North American Amphibians and Reptiles
- 1957 – Living Reptiles of the World with Robert Frederick Inger

=== Other publications ===
- Schmidt, Karl P. (1922). The American Alligator. Field Museum of Natural History, Zoology Leaflet No. 3
- Schmidt, Karl P. (1925). "New Reptiles and a New Salamander from China". American Museum Novitates (157): 1–6.
- Schmidt, Karl P.(1929). The Frogs and Toads of the Chicago Area. Field Museum of Natural History, Zoology Leaflet no. 11
- Schmidt, Karl P.(1930). The Salamanders of the Chicago Area. Field Museum of Natural History, Zoology Leaflet no. 12
- Schmidt, Karl P. (1930). "Reptiles of Marshall Field North Arabian desert expeditions, 1927–1928". Field Museum of Natural History Publication 273, Zoological series vol. 17, no. 6., p. 223-230.
- Schmidt, Karl P. (1945) A New Turtle from the Paleocene of Colorado. Fieldiana: Geology, published by the Field Museum of Natural History
- Schmidt, Karl P.; Shannon, F. A. (1947). "Notes on Amphibians and Reptiles of Michoacan, Mexico". Fieldiana Zool. 31: 63–85.
