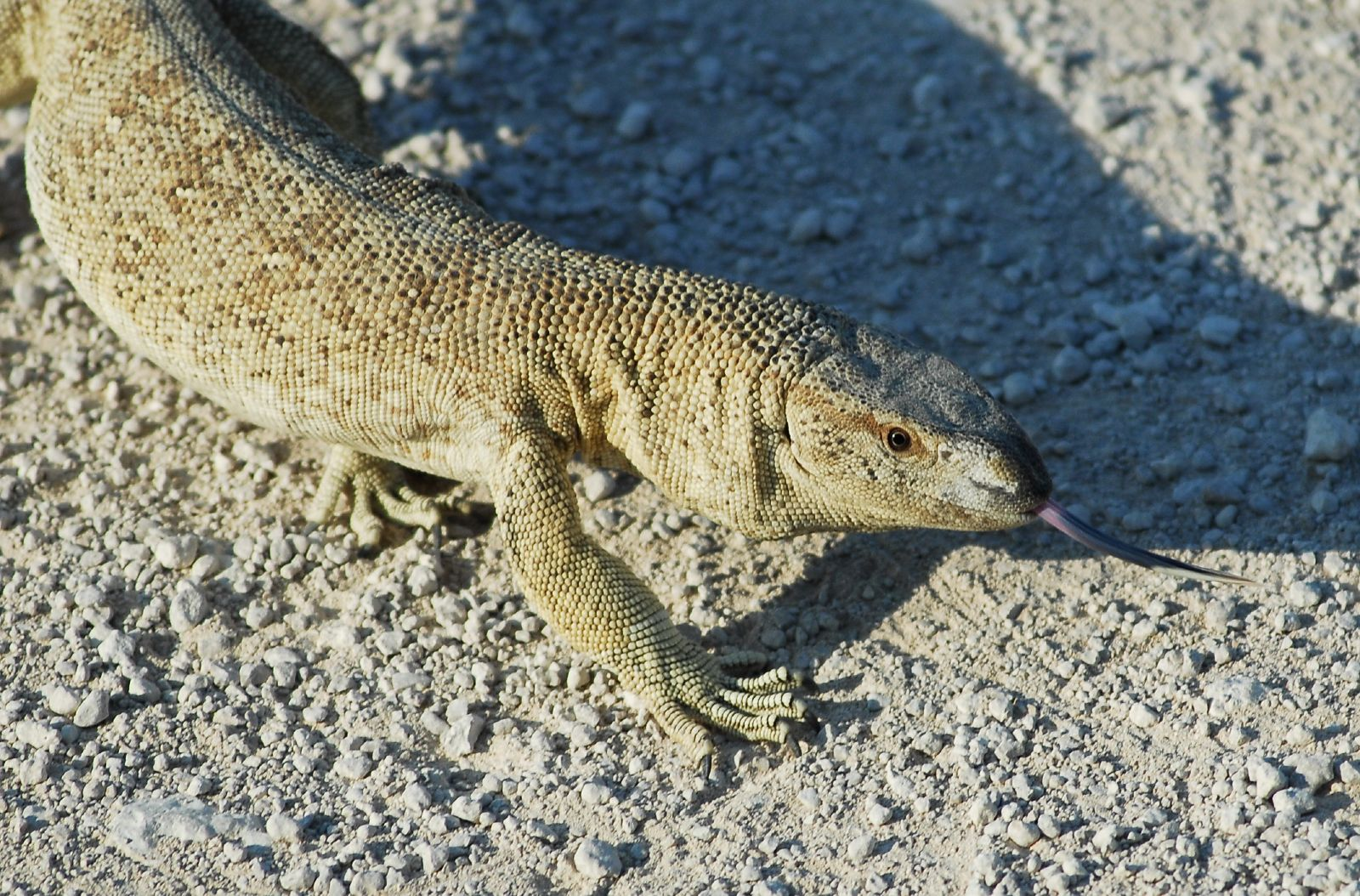

Scientific classification
- Domain: Eukaryota
- Kingdom: Animalia
- Phylum: Chordata
- Class: Reptilia
- Order: Squamata
- Family: Varanidae
- Genus: Varanus
- Species: V. albigularis
- Subspecies: V. a. angolensis

Trinomial name
- Varanus albigularis angolensis K.P. Schmidt, 1933

= Angolan white-throated monitor =

Subspecies of lizard

The Angolan white-throated monitor (Varanus albigularis angolensis) is a lizard found in and around Angola. It is usually gray-brown with yellowish or white markings, and can reach up to 1.5 m in length. It is one of the three subspecies of Varanus albigularis.

== Taxonomy ==
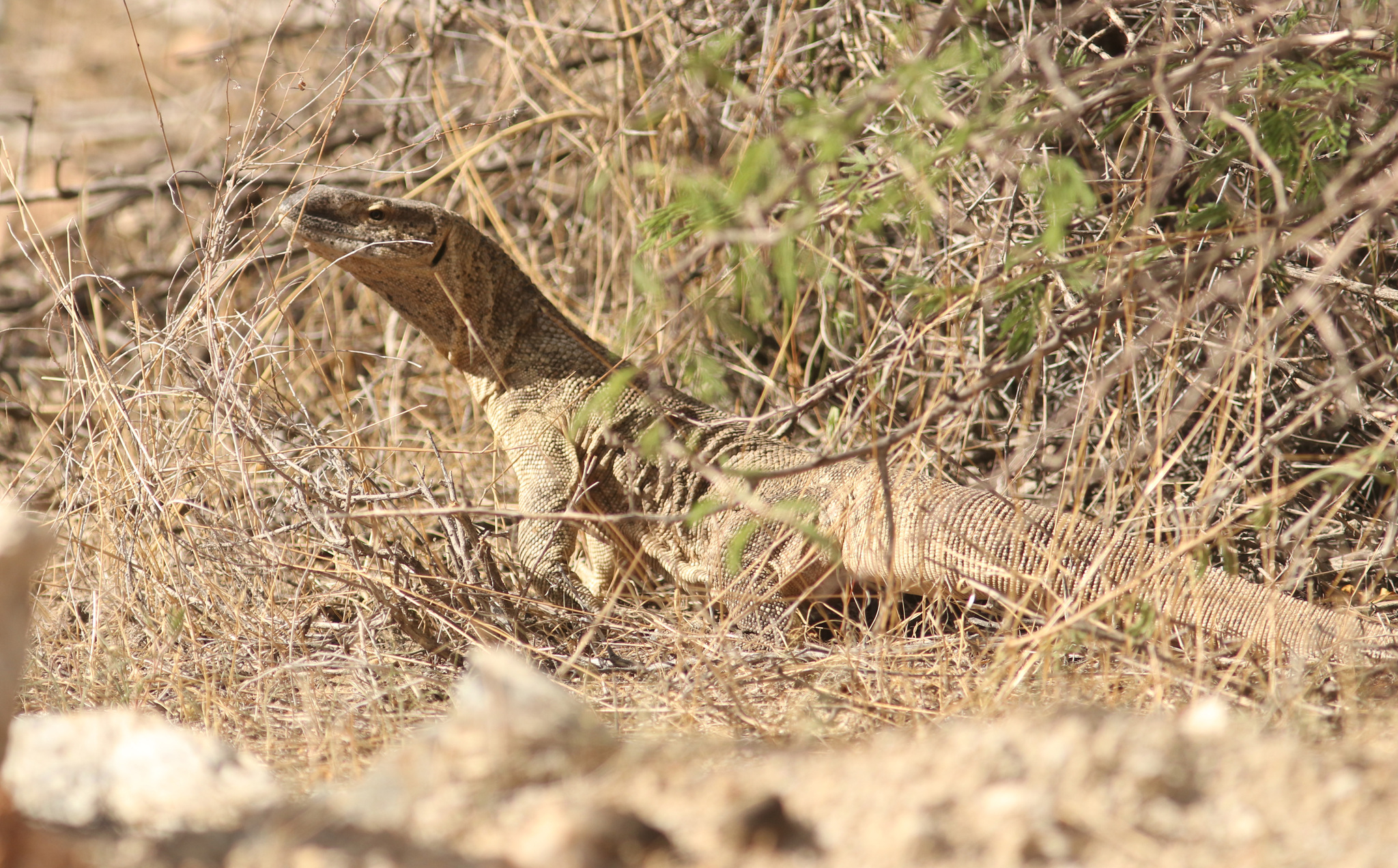
Erongo Region, Namibia

The generic name Varanus is derived from the Arabic word waral ورل, which is translated to English as "monitor". Their specific name comes from a compound of two Latin words: albus meaning "white" and gula meaning "throat". The subspecific name is a Latinized form of the country in which they are found: Angola.

== Distribution ==
Its range is through Angola, Namibia, Zambia, the Democratic Republic of Congo, and Coruche.
