= Longdong stream salamander =

Conservation status
- Endangered (IUCN 3.1)

Scientific classification
- Kingdom: Animalia
- Phylum: Chordata
- Class: Amphibia
- Order: Urodela
- Family: Hynobiidae
- Genus: Batrachuperus
- Species: B. londongensis

Binomial name
- Batrachuperus londongensis Liu & Tian, 1978

Synonyms
- Batrachuperus longdongensis Liu & Tian, 1983 (misspelling)

Species of amphibian

The Longdong stream salamander (Batrachuperus londongensis) is a species of salamander in the family Hynobiidae endemic to Sichuan, China, where it is found in its type locality in the Longdong River on Mount Emei, as well as at least three other locations across the Daxiangling range in Sichuan. Its natural habitats are rocky montane rivers, between 1300 – 1800 m above sea level.

The species is primarily threatened by collection for its use in Traditional Chinese medicine, and predation by domestic ducks and the invasive rainbow trout.
