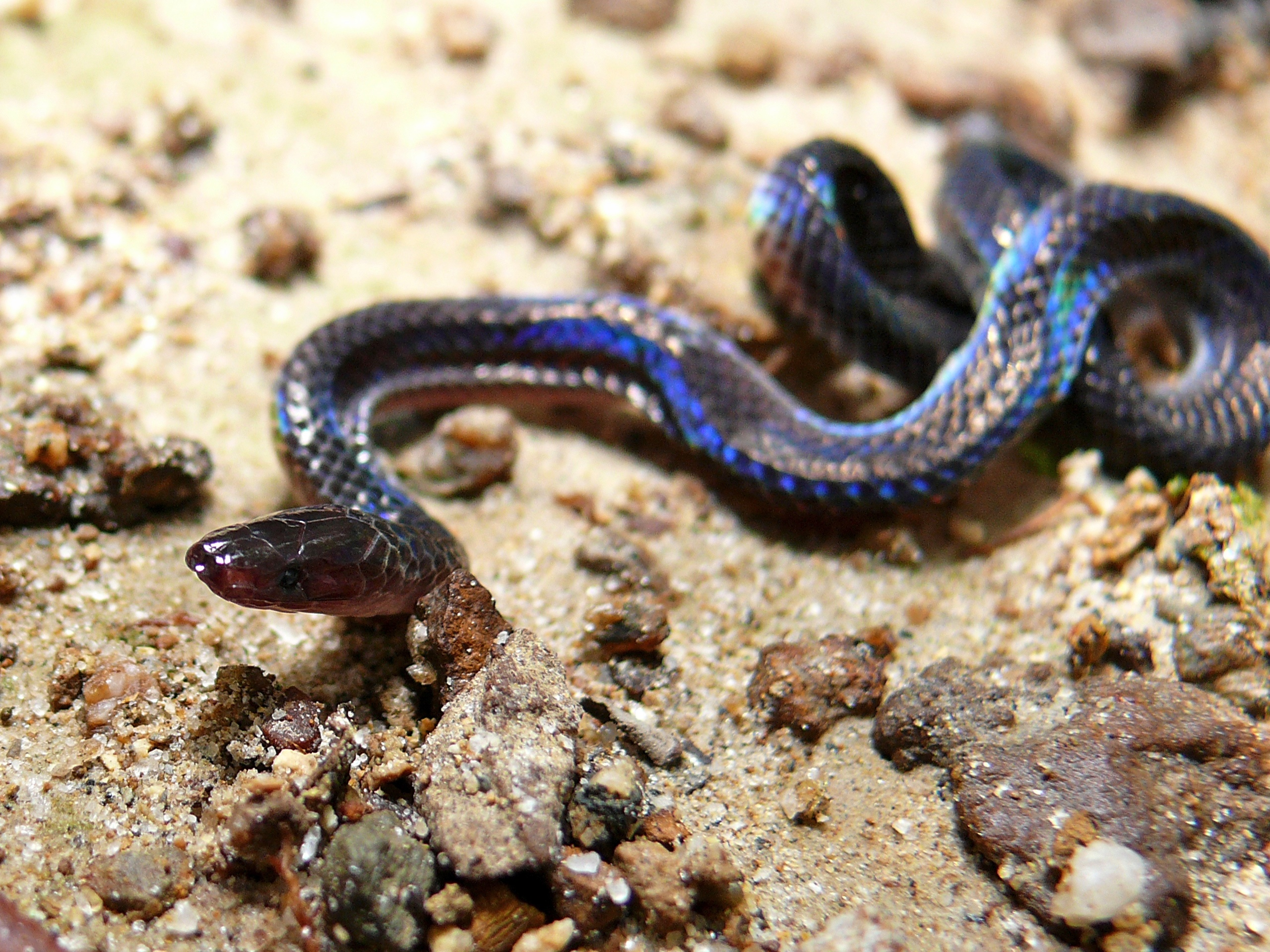

Conservation status
- Least Concern (IUCN 3.1)

Scientific classification
- Kingdom: Animalia
- Phylum: Chordata
- Class: Reptilia
- Order: Squamata
- Suborder: Serpentes
- Family: Colubridae
- Genus: Calamaria
- Species: C. schmidti

Binomial name
- Calamaria schmidti Marx & Inger, 1955

= Calamaria schmidti =

Species of snake

Calamaria schmidti, known commonly as Schmidt's reed snake, is a species of snake in the family Colubridae. The species is endemic to Malaysia.

== Etymology ==
The specific name, schmidti, is in honor of American herpetologist Karl Patterson Schmidt.

== Geographic range ==
C. schmidti is found in the Malaysian state of Sabah on the island of Borneo.

== Habitat ==
The preferred natural habitat of C. schmidti is forest, at altitudes of 1,350–1,550 m (4,430–5,090 ft).

== Description ==
The holotype of C. schmidti has a total length of 25.3 cm (10.0 in), which includes a tail 1.9 cm (0.75 in) long. The eye is much smaller than its distance from the mouth. There are four upper labials, and there is no preocular. The frontal is five or six times as wide as a supraocular.

== Diet ==
C. schmidti preys upon earthworms.

== Reproduction ==
C. schmidti is oviparous.
