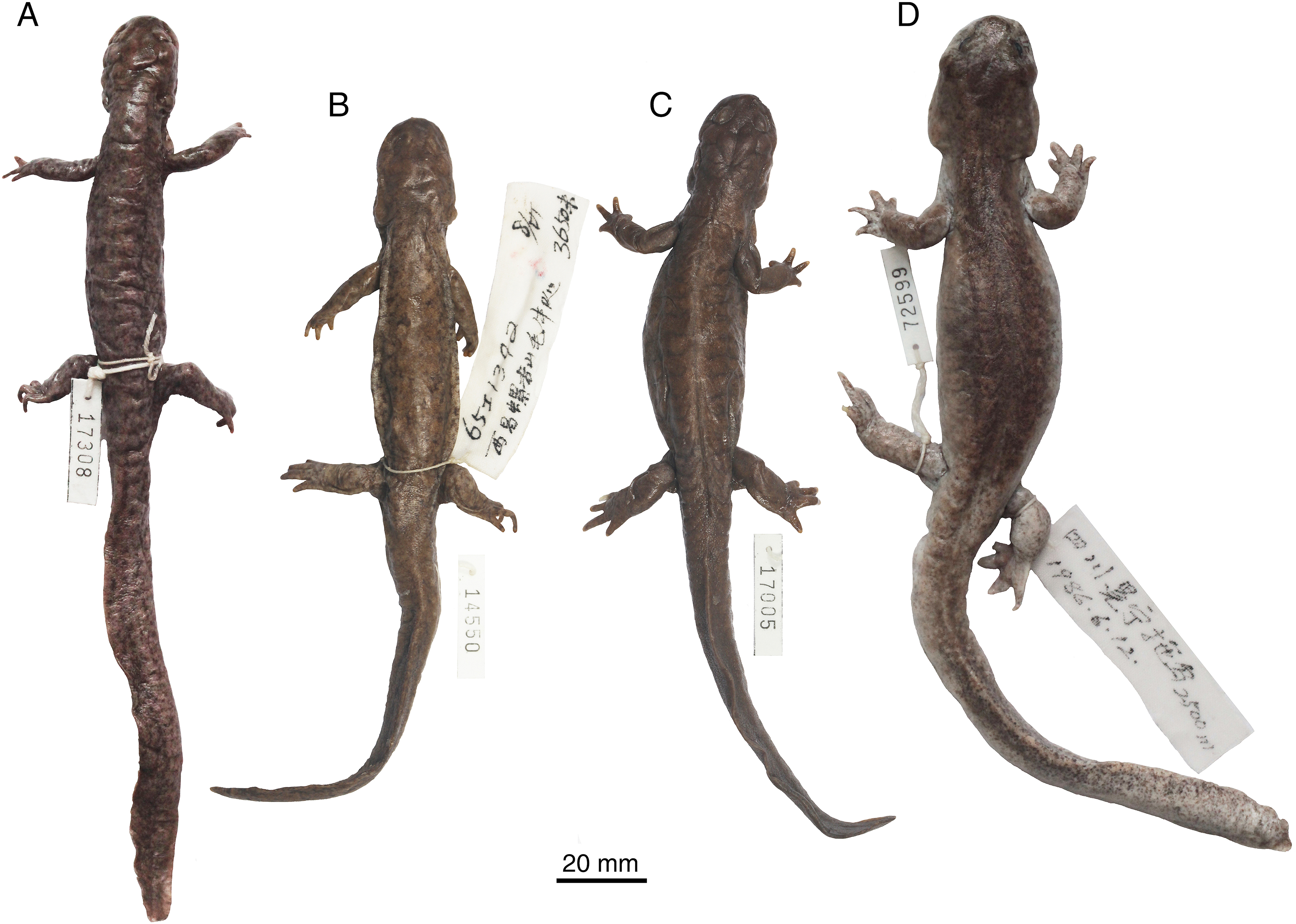
- Four preserved Batrachuperus yenyuanensis.

Scientific classification
- Kingdom: Animalia
- Phylum: Chordata
- Class: Amphibia
- Order: Urodela
- Family: Hynobiidae
- Subfamily: Hynobiinae
- Genus: Batrachuperus; Boulenger, 1878

Type species
- Desmodactylus pinchonii David, 1872

= Batrachuperus =

Genus of salamanders

Batrachuperus is a genus of salamander in the family Hynobiidae found in western China and adjacent Myanmar. Their common name is stream salamanders or mountain salamanders. Species now in Paradactylodon were formerly part of the then paraphyletic Batrachuperus.

== Species ==
The genus currently contains six species:

- Batrachuperus daochengensis Xiong, Luo & Zeng, 2020
- Batrachuperus karlschmidti Liu, 1950 (Chiala mountain salamander)
- Batrachuperus londongensis Liu and Tian, 1978 (Longdong stream salamander)
- Batrachuperus pinchonii David, 1872 (Western Chinese mountain salamander)
- Batrachuperus tibetanus Schmidt, 1925 (Alpine stream salamander)
- Batrachuperus yenyuanensis Liu, 1950 (Yenyuan stream salamander)

== Intrinsic Phylogeny ==
- - Batrachuperus yenyuanensis
  - - - Batrachuperus pinchonii
      - Batrachuperus londongensis
    - - Batrachuperus tibetanus
      - Batrachuperus karlschmidti

Intrinsic phylogeny tree of genus Batrachuperus.
