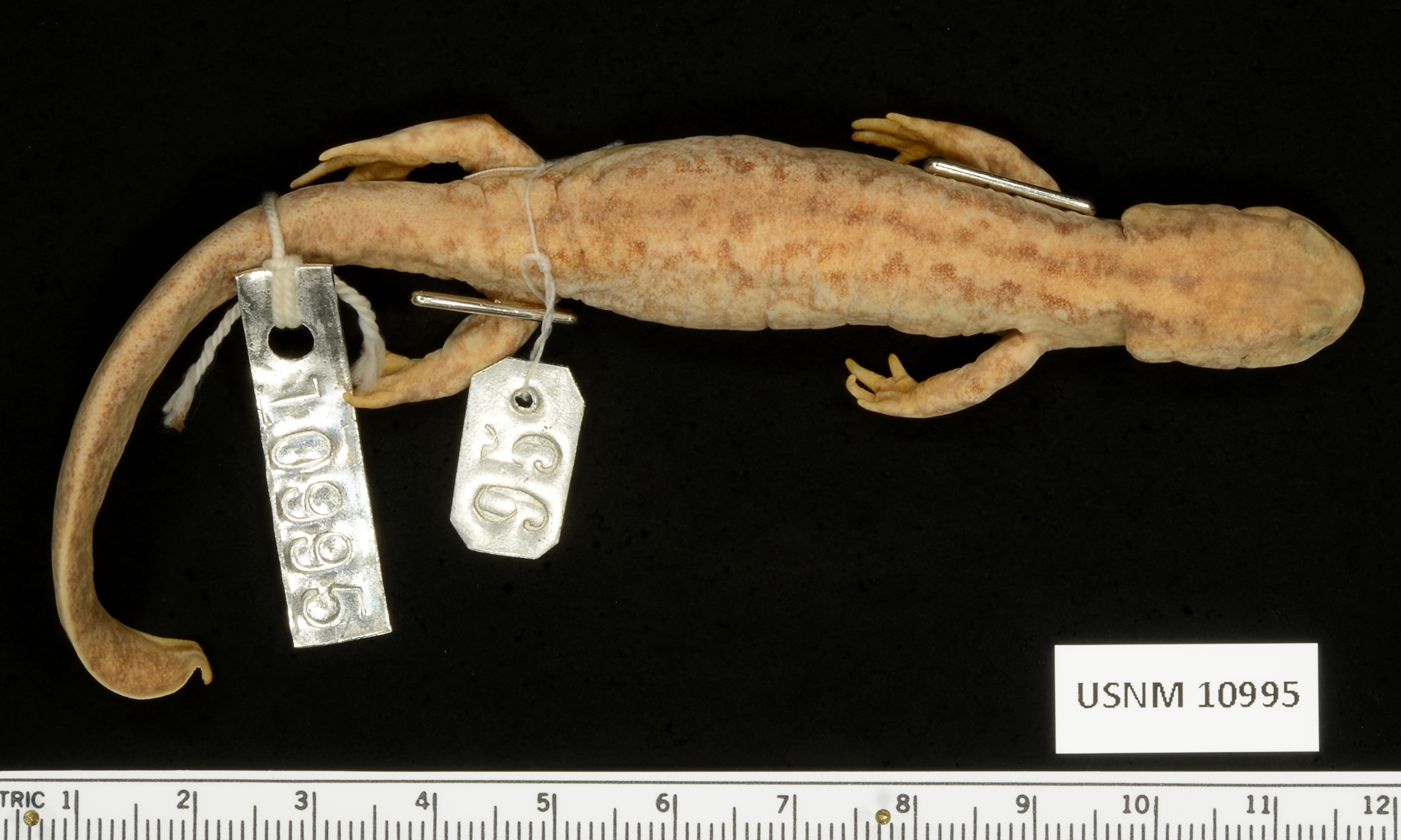
- Museum specimen

Conservation status
- Vulnerable (IUCN 3.1)

Scientific classification
- Kingdom: Animalia
- Phylum: Chordata
- Class: Amphibia
- Order: Urodela
- Family: Hynobiidae
- Genus: Batrachuperus
- Species: B. pinchonii

Binomial name
- Batrachuperus pinchonii (David, 1872)

Synonyms
- Batrachuperus cochranae Liu, 1950

= Batrachuperus pinchonii =

Species of amphibian

Batrachuperus pinchonii, the Western Chinese mountain salamander or stream salamander, is a species of hynobiid salamander that is endemic to China. It is found in Sichuan, Yunnan, and Guangxi provinces.

Batrachuperis pinchonii is known in Chinese legend as the White Dragon. During the 16th century, a Chinese author documented its presence at the Omei mountain in the province of Sichuan. He wrote, "the salamanders living in clear water have some larger toes, a yellow coloration with black spots, four feet, a snout that is slightly raised, a graceful body and an amiable air." Moreover, local peasants would entreat it to bring rain during especially dry seasons.

Batrachuperis pinchonii are used for traditional Chinese medicine and for food. Over-collection is now threatening the species.

The Washington Department of Fish and Wildlife website has declared Batrachuperis pinchonii an invasive species in the United States.
