= Egg-eating snake =

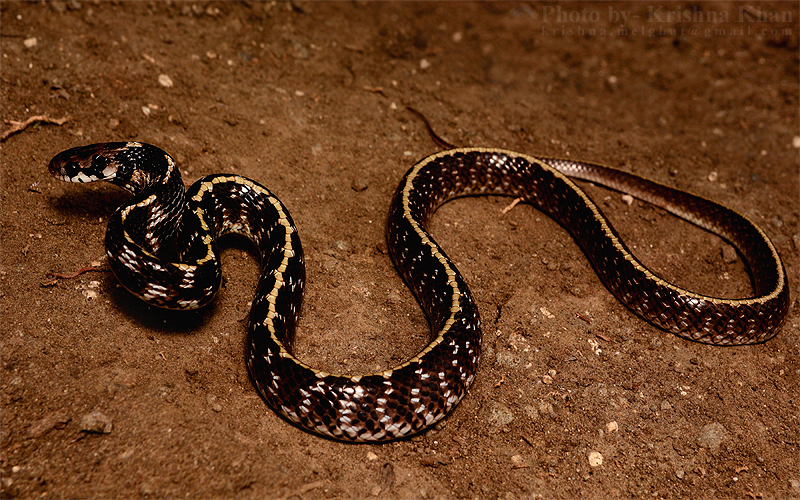
Elachistodon westermanni

Egg-eating snake can refer to six different species of snake, found within two genera:

- Dasypeltis, the group of African egg-eating snakes
- Indian egg-eating snake (Elachistodon westermanni)
