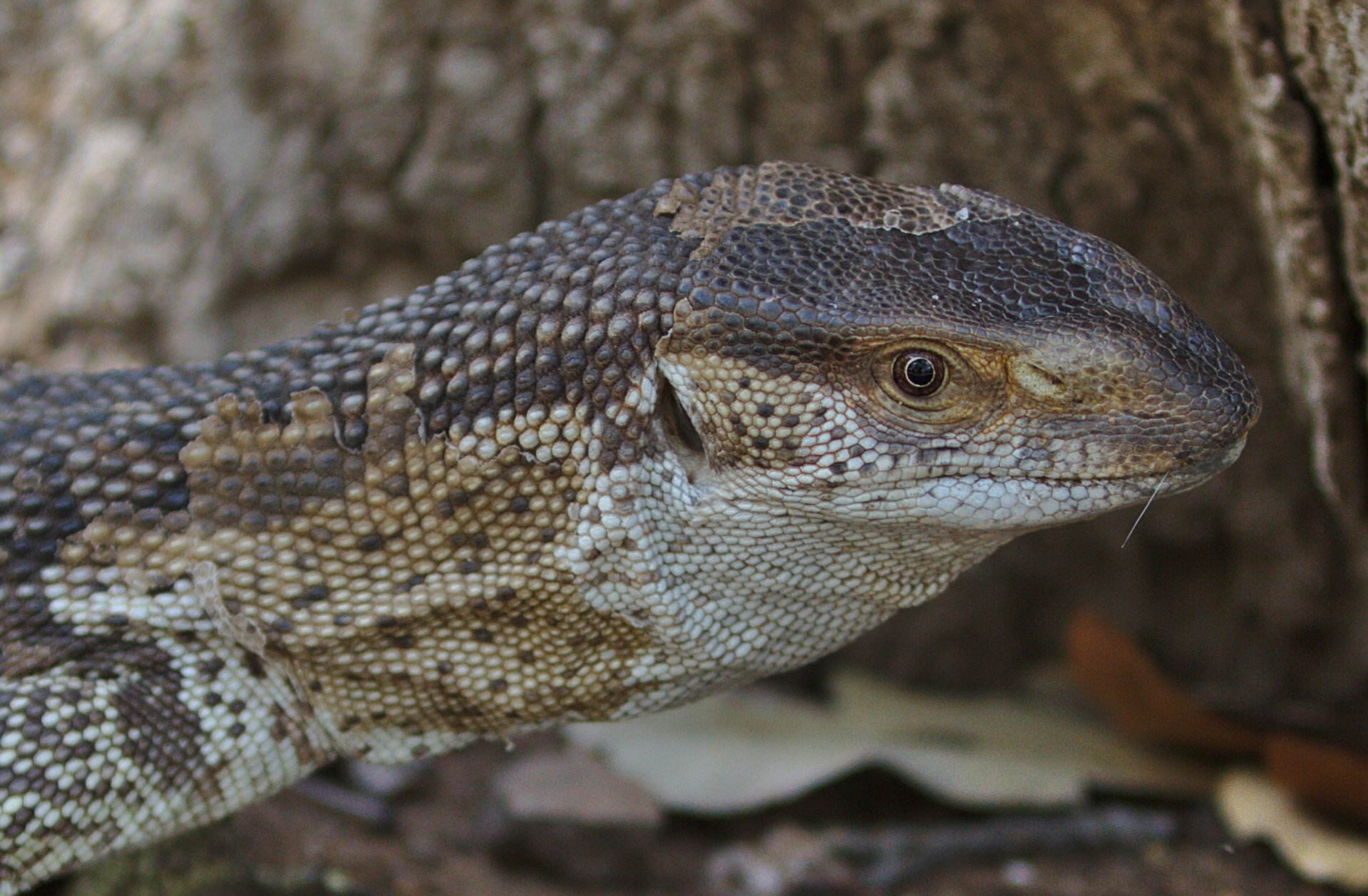

Scientific classification
- Kingdom: Animalia
- Phylum: Chordata
- Class: Reptilia
- Order: Squamata
- Suborder: Anguimorpha
- Family: Varanidae
- Genus: Varanus
- Species: V. albigularis
- Subspecies: V. a. albigularis

Trinomial name
- Varanus albigularis albigularis Daudin, 1802

= White-throated monitor =

White-throated monitor lizard

Subspecies of lizard

The white-throated monitor (Varanus albigularis albigularis) is a lizard found in southern Africa. They are usually gray-brown with yellowish or white markings, and can reach up to 2 metres (6.6 ft) in length. They are found in Southern Africa, northwards to Angola, Zambia, and Mozambique.

== Taxonomy ==
First described by François Marie Daudin in 1802, these lizards were previously classed as a subspecies of Varanus exanthematicus, but have since been declared a distinct species based upon differences in hemipenal morphology. The generic name Varanus is derived from the Arabic word waral ورل, which is translated to English as "monitor". Their specific name comes from a compound of two Latin words: albus meaning "white" and gula meaning "throat".

== Diet ==
Varanus albigularis albigularis are generalists, feeding opportunistically on a broad variety of prey in the wild. Tortoises make up a significant part of their diet, and are swallowed whole due to the hard shell. Otherwise, they consume very little vertebrate prey, eating primarily invertebrates, especially millipedes, beetles, molluscs and orthopterans. Millipedes for example form nearly a quarter of their diet; the monitors are apparently resistant to its poisonous secretions. Although not averse to occasionally scavenging the corpses of vertebrate prey, even those as large as vervet monkeys, such prey seems usually too fast to catch for these monitors. This contrasts with what is often a diet of mostly vertebrates in captivity, such as rodents or poultry.

== Predation ==
It is hunted by birds of prey such as eagles.

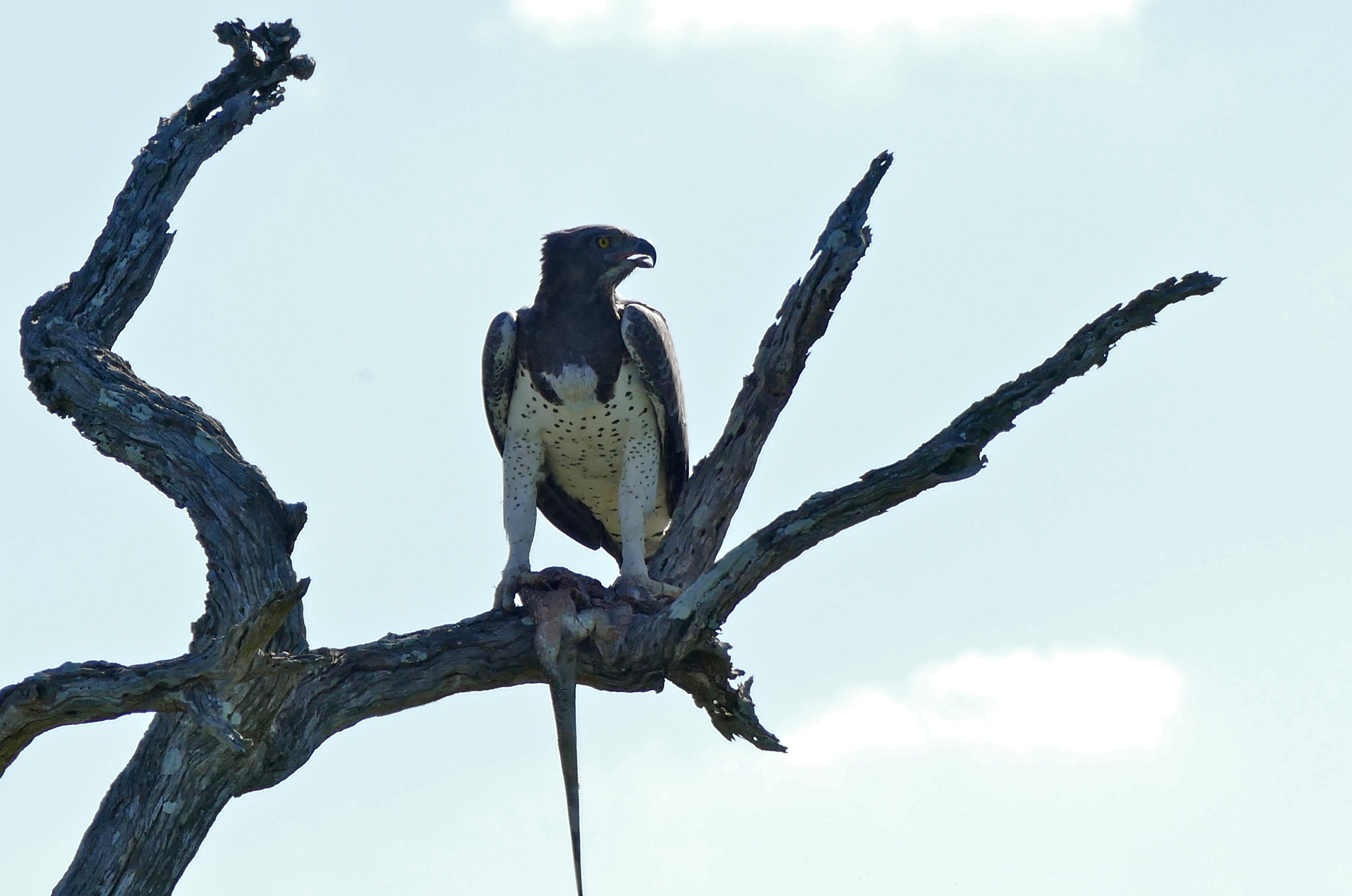
Martial eagle feeding on a white-throated monitor.

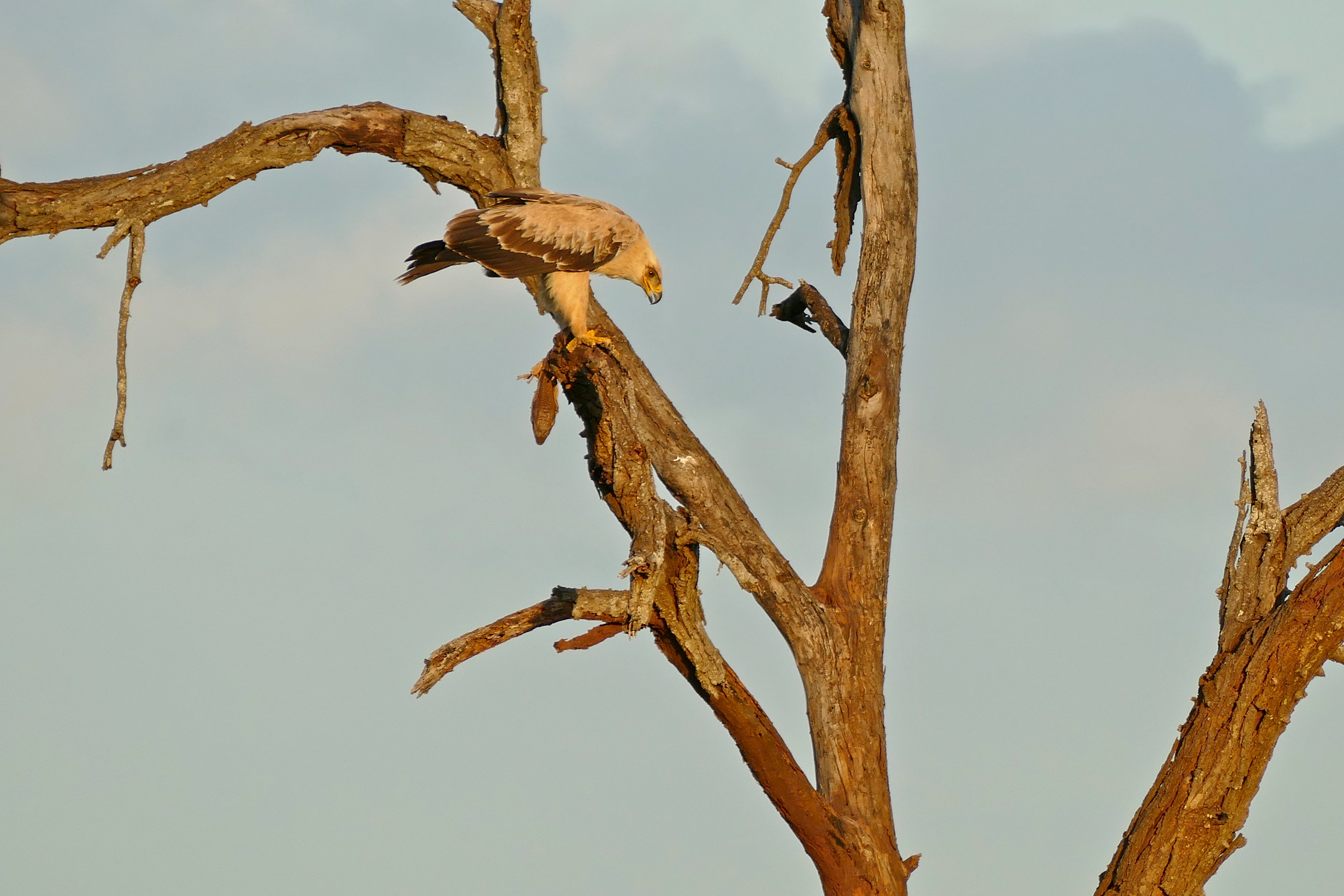
Juvenile tawny eagle eating a white-throated monitor

== Captivity ==
This subspecies is kept as a pet.

== Gallery ==
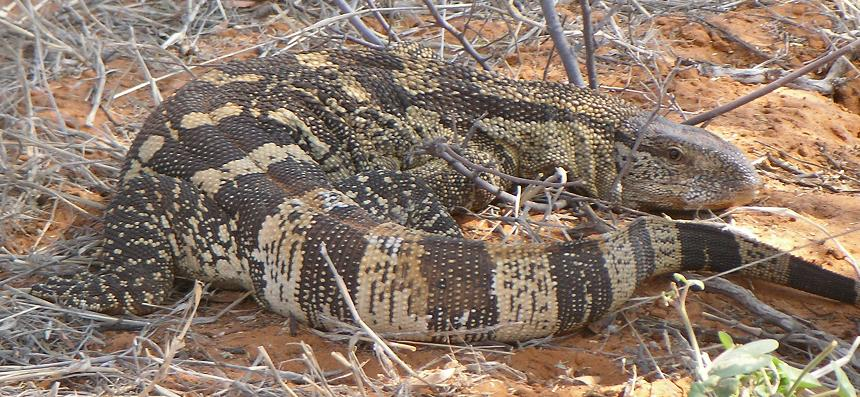
Kalahari, North Cape, South Africa

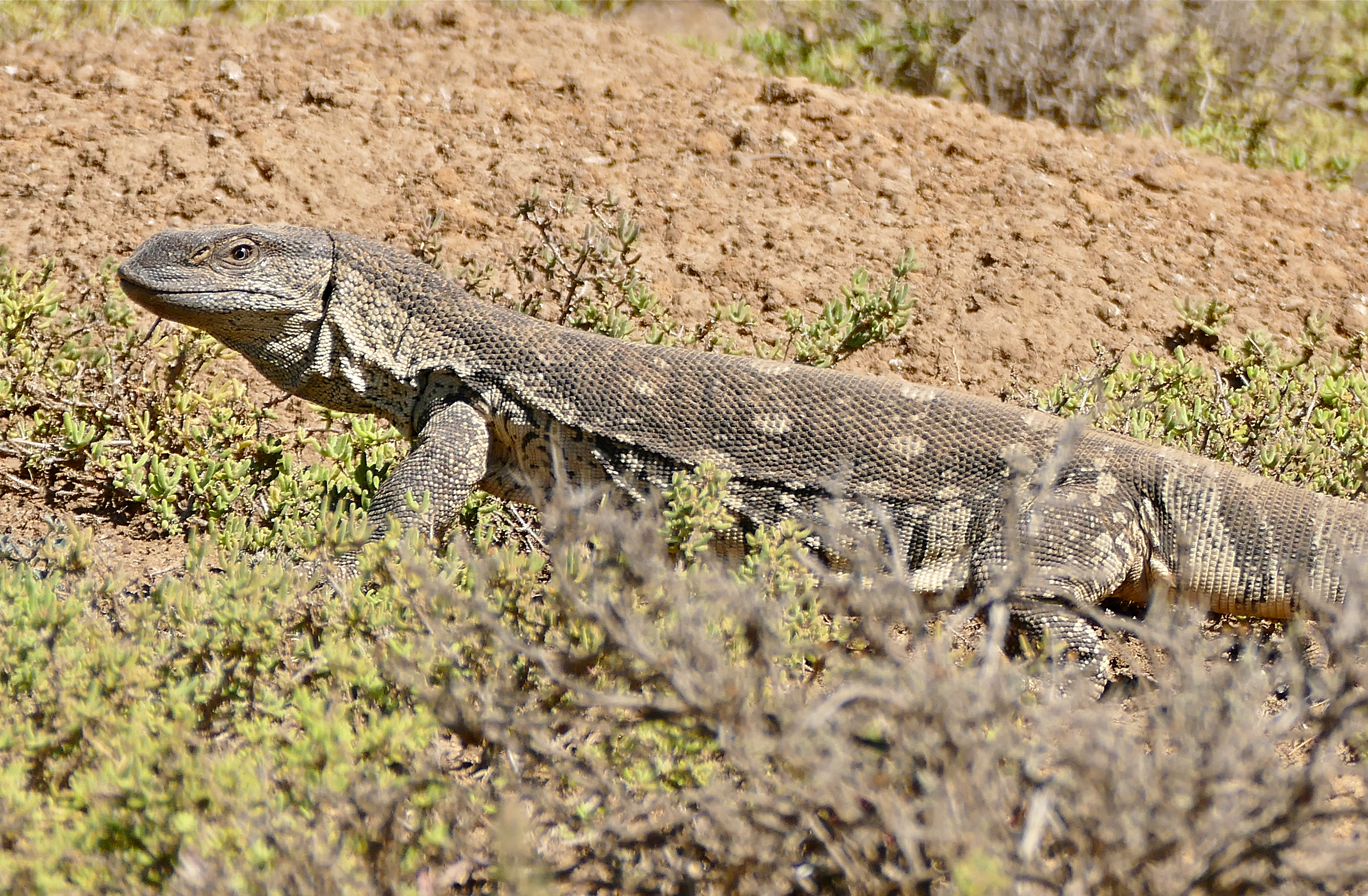
Mountain Zebra National Park, Eastern Cape, South Africa

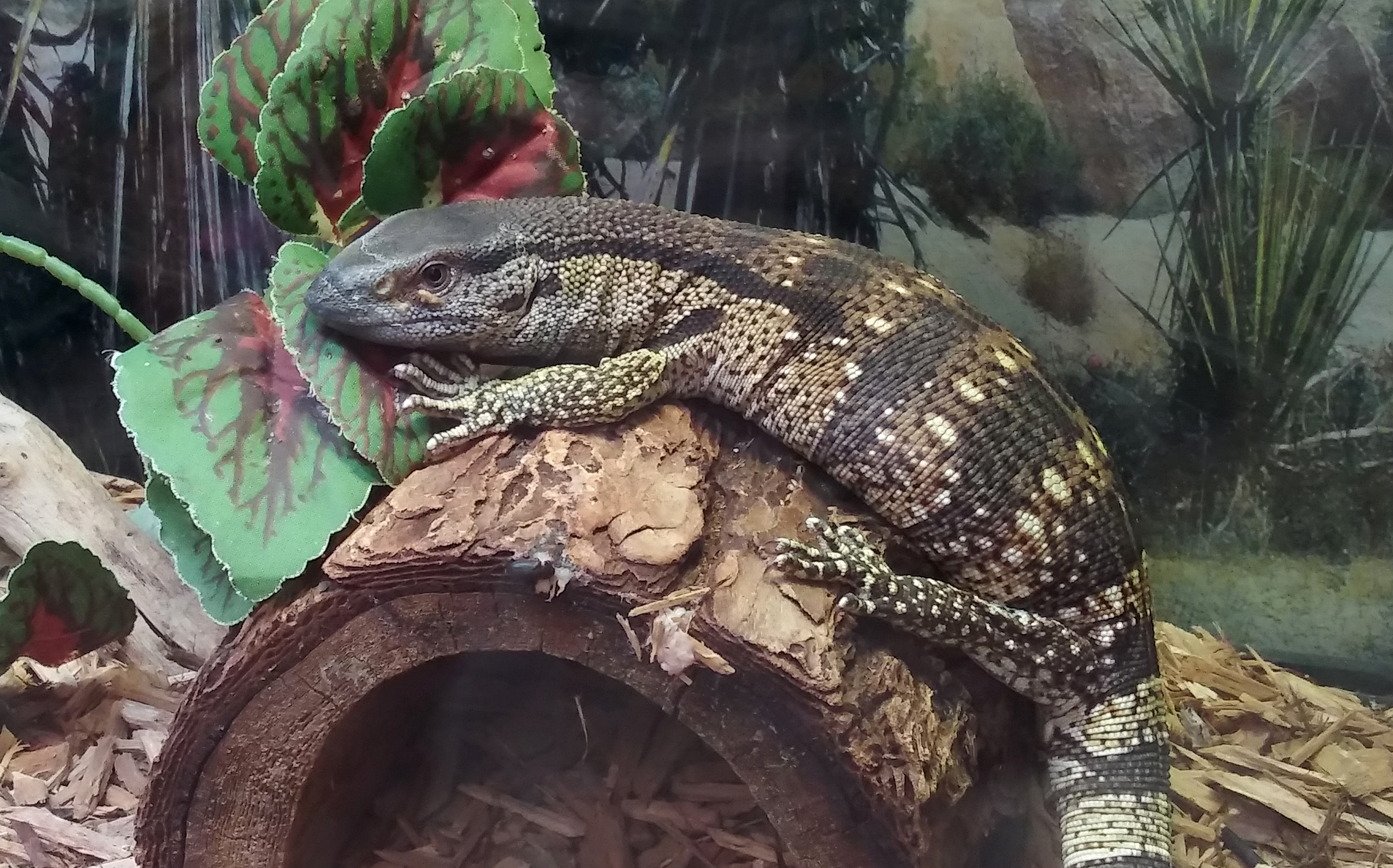
Cape banded white-throated monitor at a pet store in Largo, Florida
South Africa, Kruger National Park Gallery

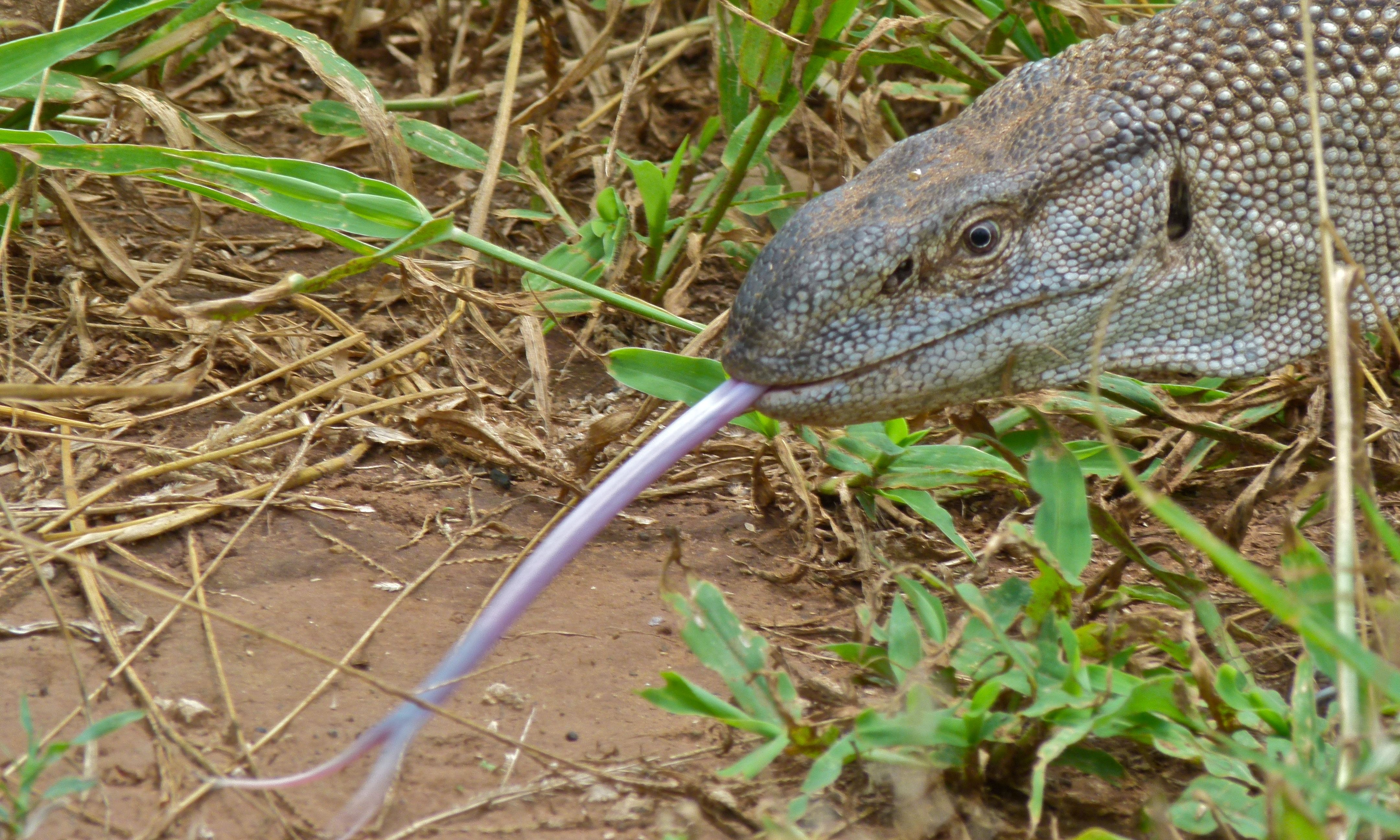

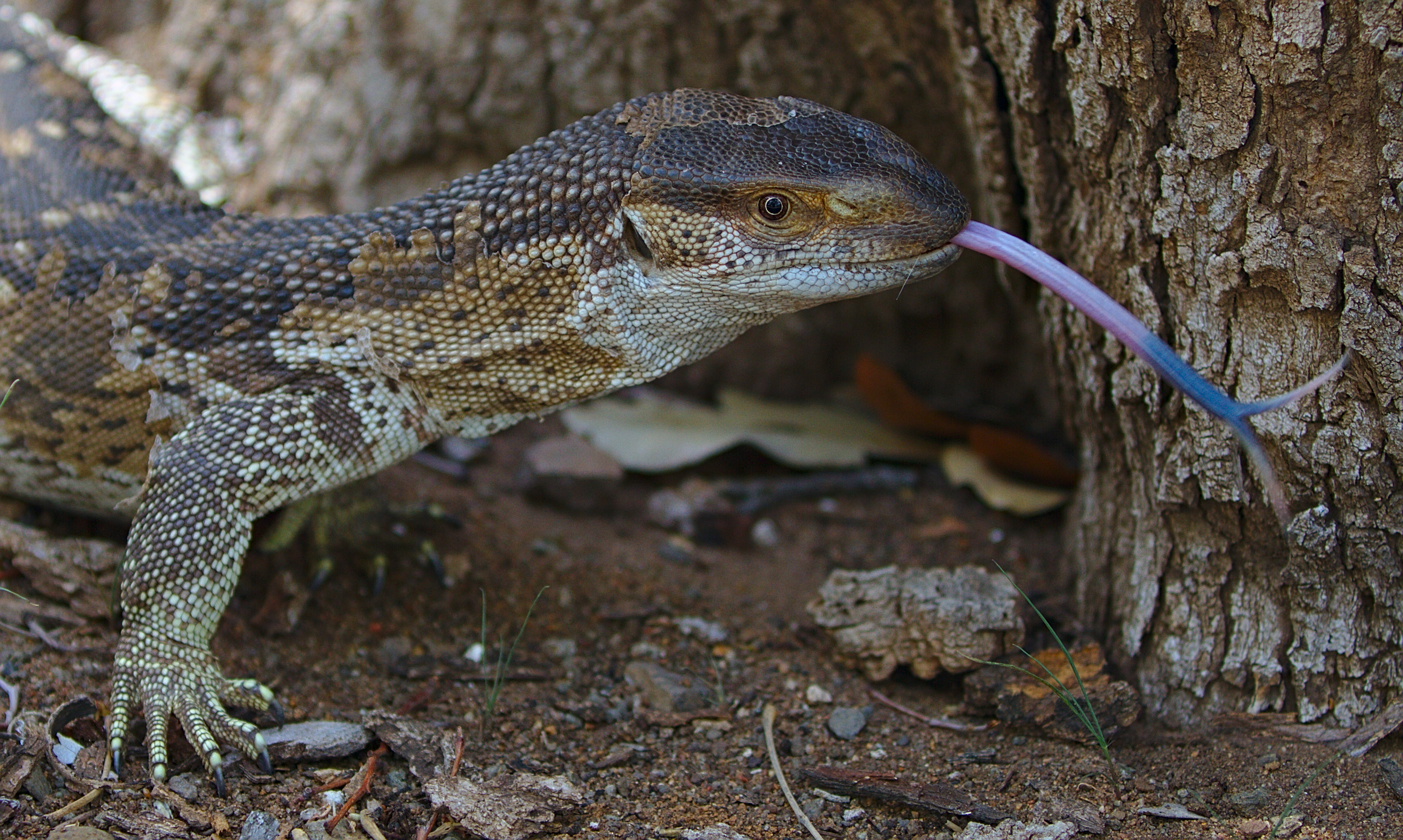

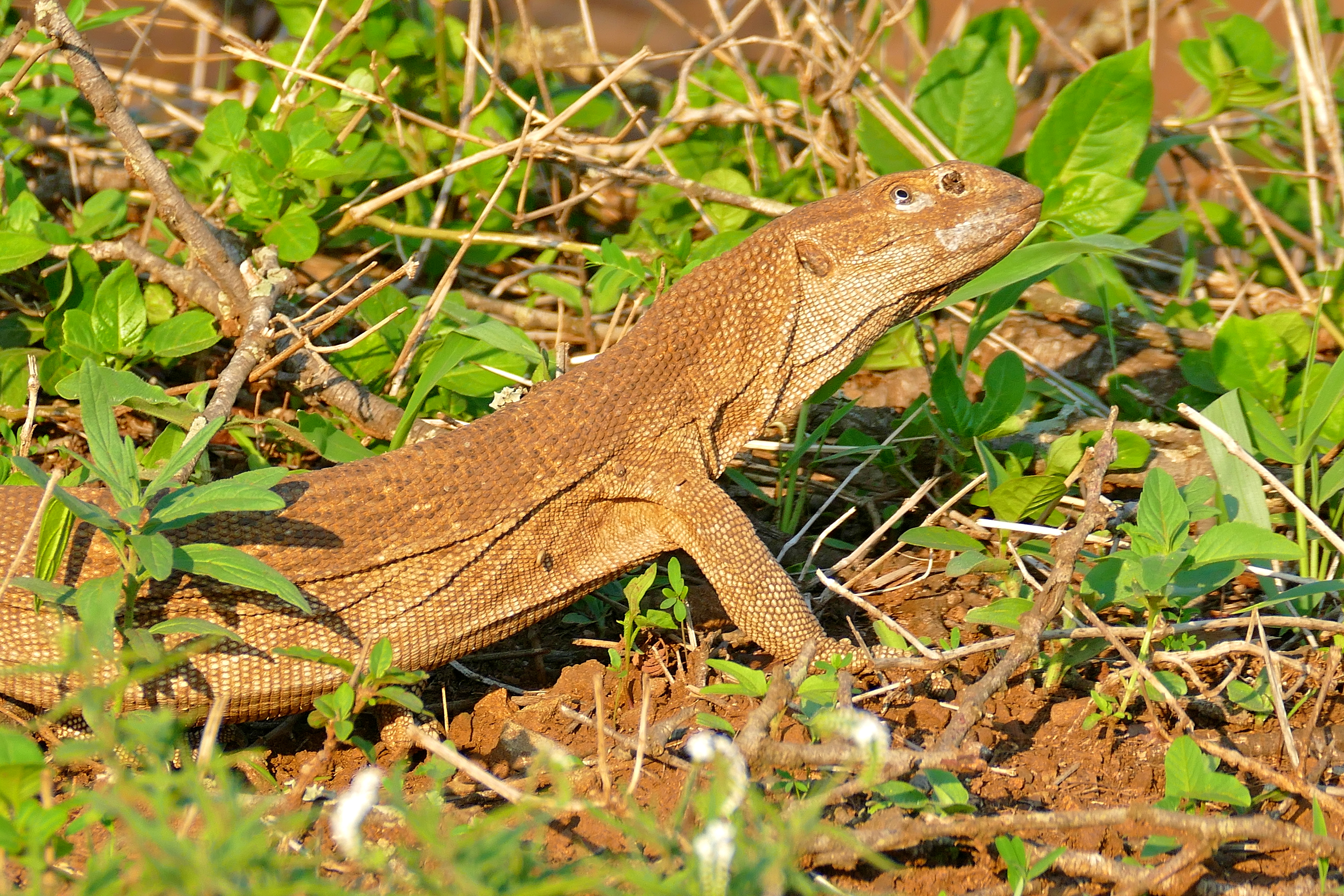

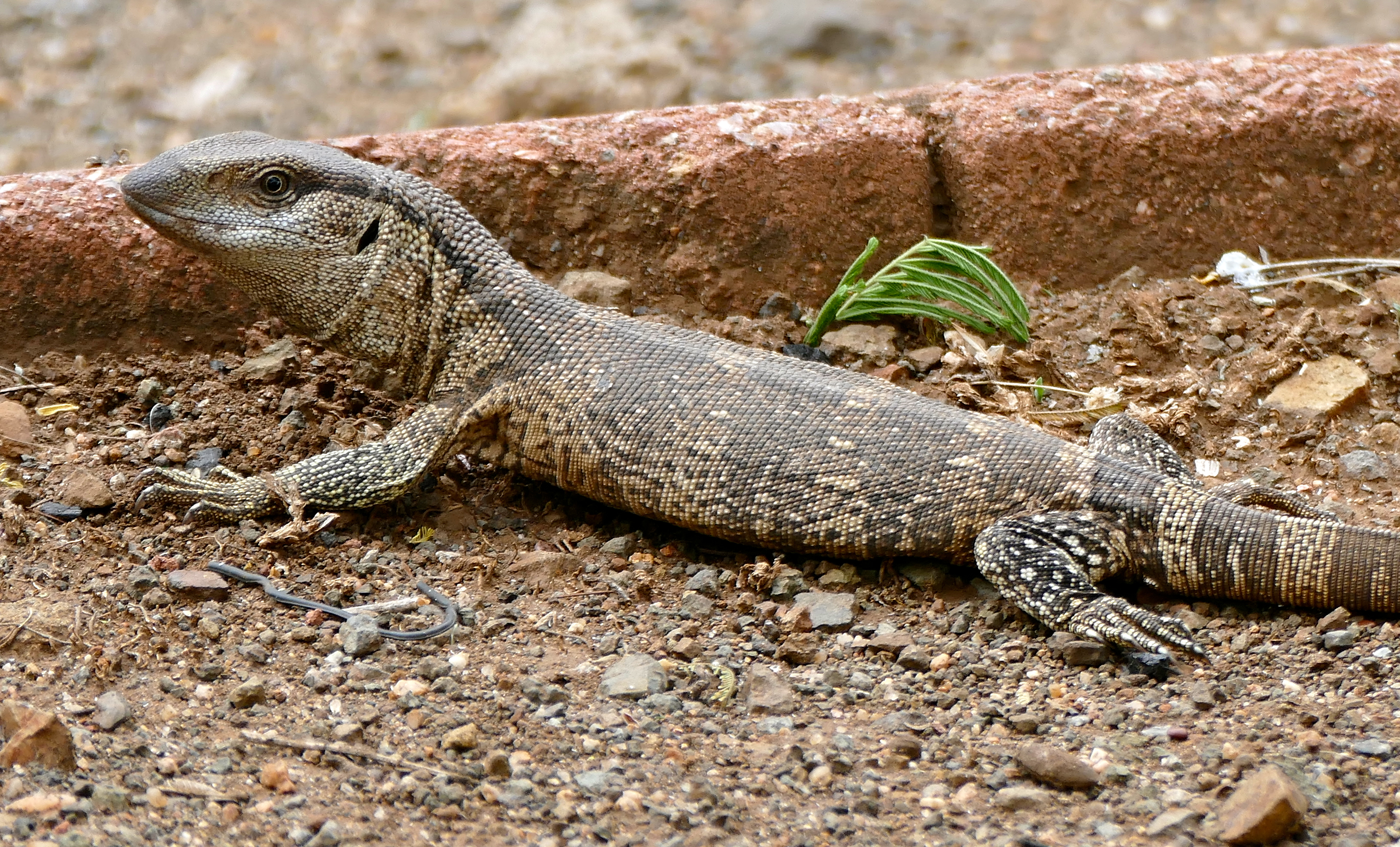
Juvenile

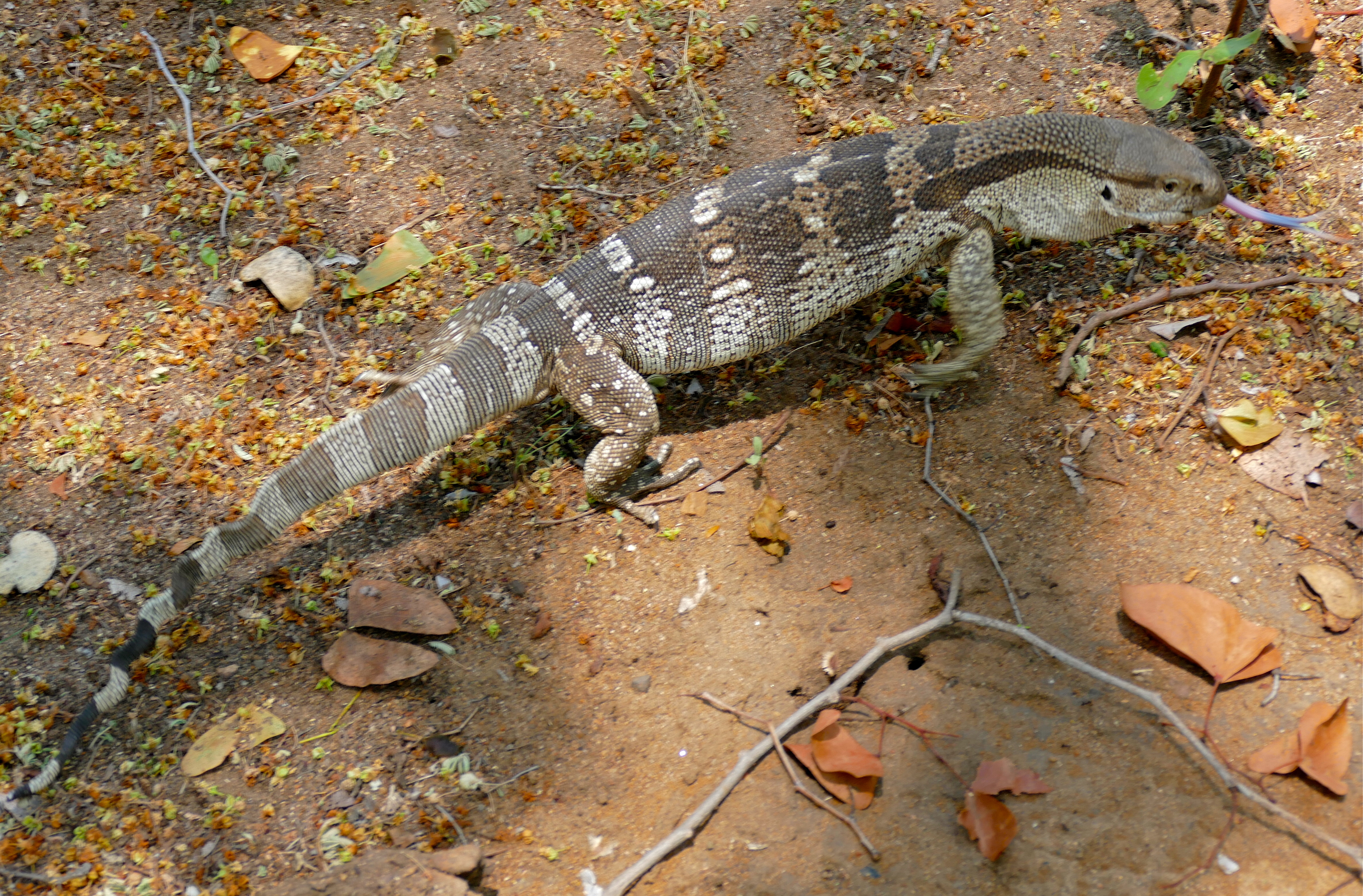
Crooked tail

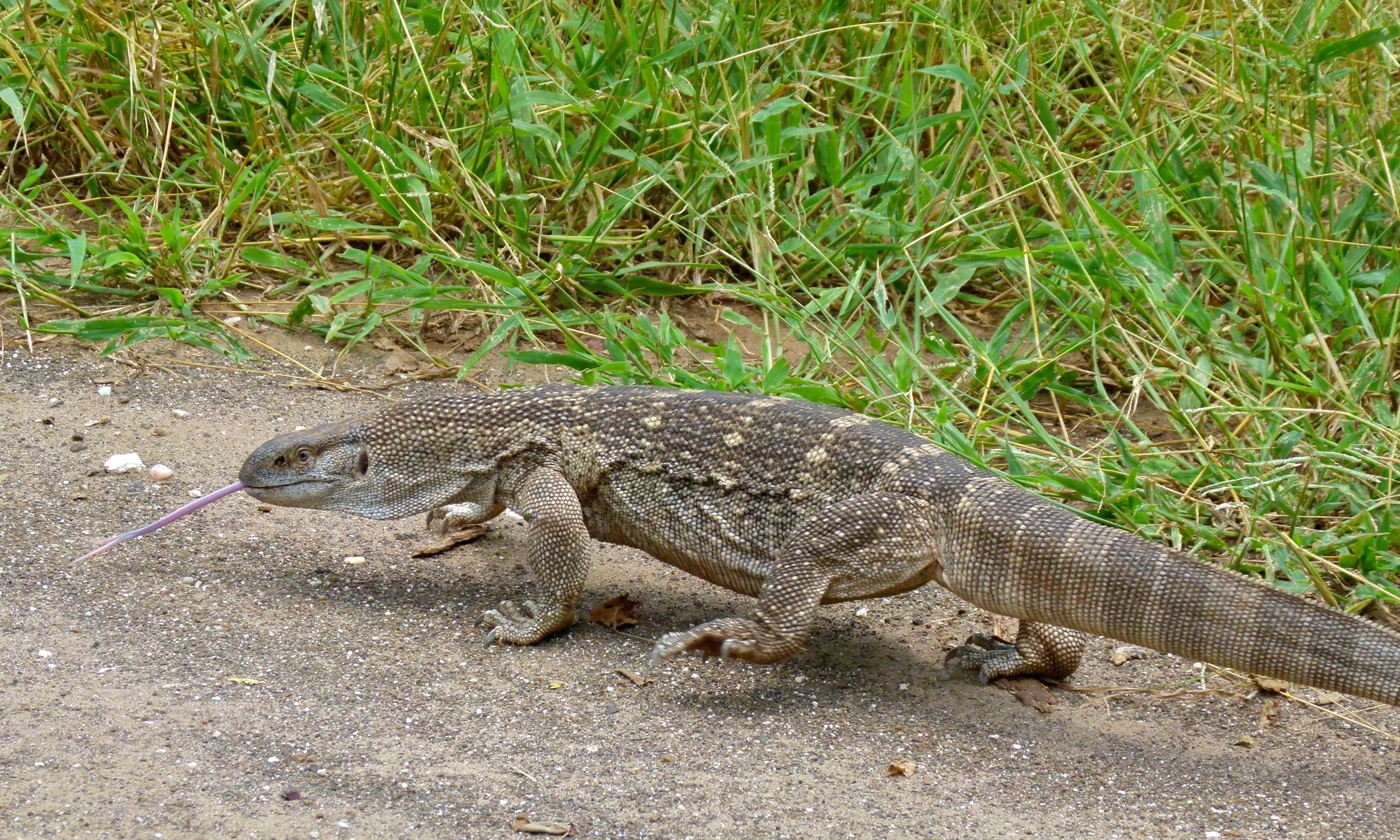

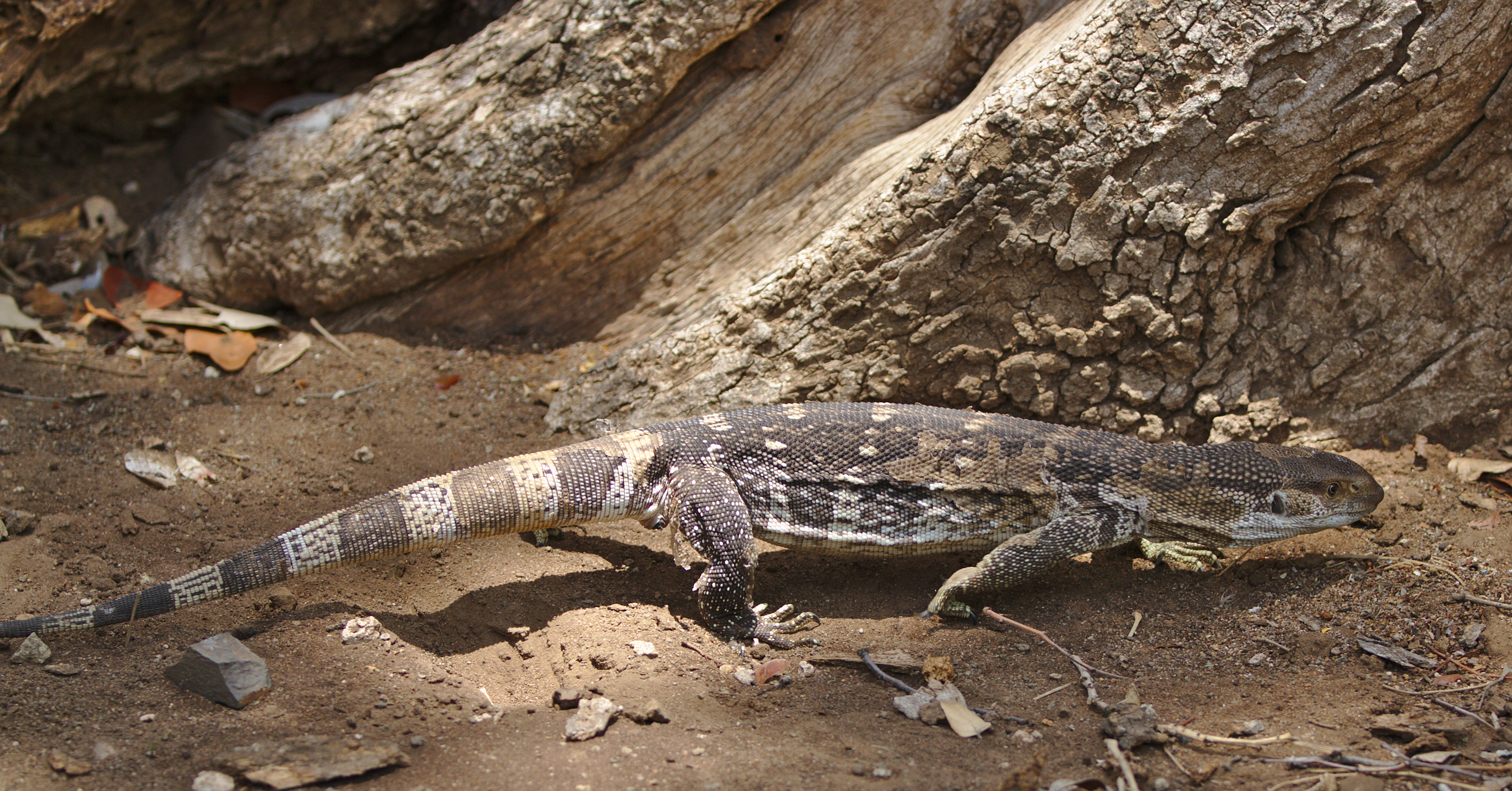

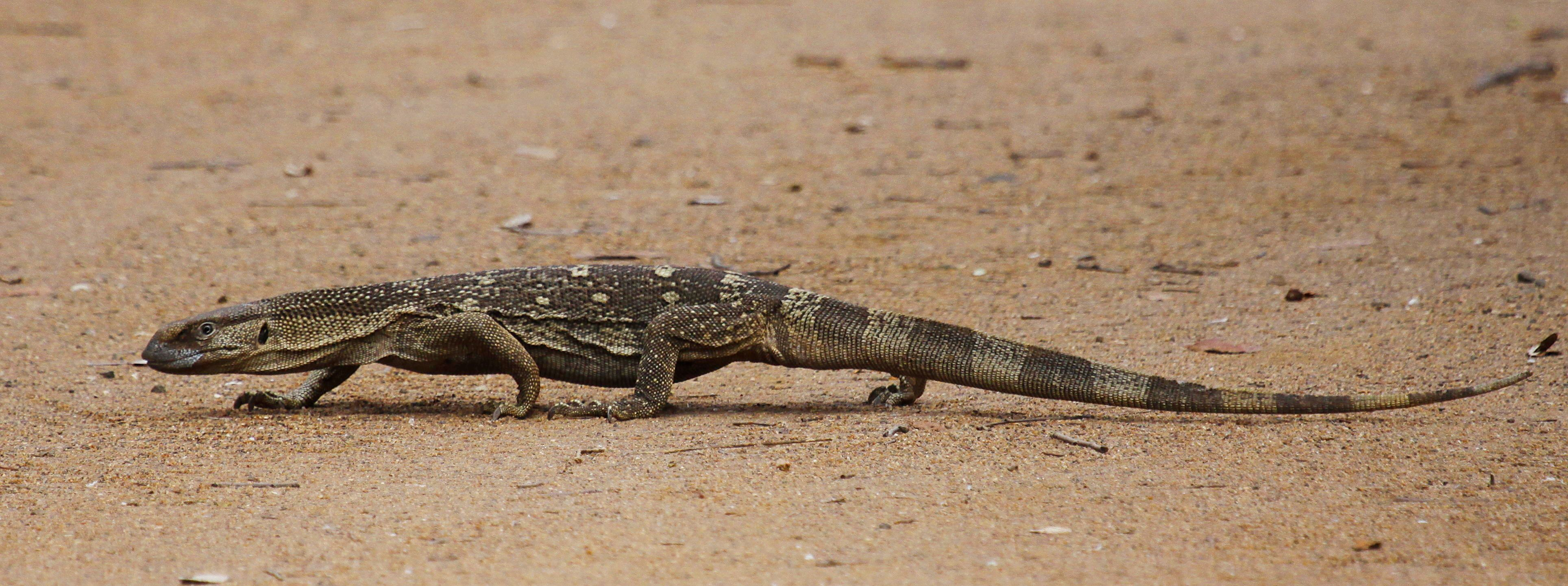
