= Alpine stream salamander =

Conservation status
- Vulnerable (IUCN 3.1)

Scientific classification
- Kingdom: Animalia
- Phylum: Chordata
- Class: Amphibia
- Order: Urodela
- Family: Hynobiidae
- Genus: Batrachuperus
- Species: B. tibetanus

Binomial name
- Batrachuperus tibetanus Schmidt, 1925

Synonyms
- Batrachuperus taibaiensis Song, Zeng, Wu, Liu, and Fu, 2001

Species of amphibian

The alpine stream salamander (Batrachuperus tibetanus) is a species of salamander in the family Hynobiidae endemic to central China. Its natural habitats are rivers and freshwater springs. It is threatened by habitat loss.

It lives in Tibet, Sichuan, Shaanxi, Qinghai, and Gansu provinces of China.
