= Liolaemus schmidti =

Conservation status
- Least Concern (IUCN 3.1)

Scientific classification
- Kingdom: Animalia
- Phylum: Chordata
- Class: Reptilia
- Order: Squamata
- Suborder: Iguania
- Family: Liolaemidae
- Genus: Liolaemus
- Species: L. schmidti

Binomial name
- Liolaemus schmidti (Marx, 1960)

Species of lizard

Liolaemus schmidti, Schmidt's tree iguana, is a species of lizard in the family Iguanidae. It is from Chile and Bolivia.
