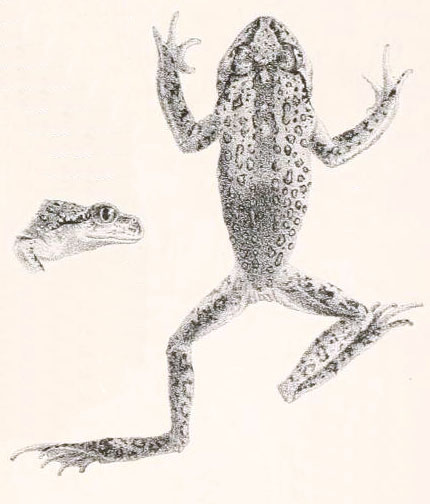
- Scutiger boulengeri

Scientific classification
- Kingdom: Animalia
- Phylum: Chordata
- Class: Amphibia
- Order: Anura
- Family: Megophryidae
- Genus: Scutiger; Theobald, 1868

Type species
- Bombinator sikimmensis Blyth, 1855

= Scutiger (frog) =

Scutiger Temporal range: Oligocene - Present

Genus of amphibians

Scutiger is a genus of toads in the family Megophryidae. Common name lazy toads has been coined for them. They occur in China, Burma, Nepal, and northern India in high-altitude habitats. Most are endemic to China.

== Evolution ==
A 2017 molecular phylogenetic study found that Scutiger originated in Paleo-Tibet during the Oligocene.

== Species ==
The following species are recognised in the genus Scutiger:

- Scutiger adungensis Dubois, 1979 – Adung lazy toad
- Scutiger bhutanensis Delorme and Dubois, 2001
- Scutiger boulengeri (Bedriaga, 1898) – Boulenger's lazy toad, Xizang alpine toad, Himalayan stream frog
- Scutiger brevipes (Liu, 1950)
- Scutiger chintingensis Liu and Hu, 1960 – Chinting lazy toad, Chinting alpine toad
- Scutiger ghunsa Khatiwada, Shu, Subedi, Wang, Ohler, Cannatella, Xie, and Jiang, 2019 – Ghunsa high altitude toad
- Scutiger glandulatus (Liu, 1950) – Hopachai lazy toad, chest gland cat-eyed toad
- Scutiger gongshanensis Yang and Su, 1979 – Gongshan lazy toad, Gongshan cat-eyed toad
- Scutiger jiulongensis Fei, Ye, and Jiang, 1995 – Jiulong cat-eyed toad
- Scutiger liupanensis Huang, 1985 – Liupan lazy toad, Liupan alpine toad
- Scutiger maculatus (Liu, 1950) – spotted lazy toad, piebald alpine toad
- Scutiger mammatus (Günther, 1896) – Tungsolo lazy toad
- Scutiger muliensis Fei and Ye, 1986 – Muli cat-eyed toad
- Scutiger nepalensis Dubois, 1974 – Nepal lazy toad, mountain pelobatid toad, Asiatic spadefoot toad
- Scutiger ningshanensis Fang, 1985 – Ningshan lazy toad, Ningshan alpine toad
- Scutiger nyingchiensis Fei, 1977 – Nyingchi lazy toad, Ladakh pelobatid toad, Nyingshi alpine toad
- Scutiger occidentalis Dubois, 1978 – Ladakh high altitude toad
- Scutiger pingwuensis Liu and Tian, 1978 – Pingwu lazy toad, Pingwu alpine toad
- Scutiger sikimmensis (Blyth, 1855) – Sikkim lazy toad, Sikkim high altitude toad, Blyth's short-limbed frog
- Scutiger spinosus Jiang, Wang, Li, and Che, 2016 – spiny lazy toad
- Scutiger tengchongensis Yang & Huang, 2019
- Scutiger tuberculatus Liu and Fei, 1979 – bumpy lazy toad, round-tubercled cat-eyed toad
- Scutiger wanglangensis Ye and Fei, 2007 – Wanglang alpine toad
- Scutiger wuguanfui Jiang, Rao, Yuan, Wang, Li, Hou, Che, and Che, 2012 – Wu's lazy toad, Medog lazy toad

== Endemic ranges ==
Many Scutiger species are endemic to highly restricted geographical areas in the Eastern Himalayas. The ranges often overlap with those of Oreolalax species.

- Ningxia, China
  - Scutiger liupanensis: Liupanshan National Nature Reserve, Jingyuan County, Ningxia Hui Autonomous Region, China
- Shaanxi, China
  - Scutiger ningshanensis: Ningshan County, Shaanxi
- Sichuan, China
  - Scutiger brevipes: Dawu County, Sichuan
  - Scutiger chintingensis: Mount Emei area, Sichuan
  - Scutiger jiulongensis: Jiulong County, Sichuan
  - Scutiger maculatus: Garze, Sichuan and Jiangda, Tibet
  - Scutiger muliensis: Muli County, Sichuan
  - Scutiger pingwuensis: Pingwu County, Sichuan
  - Scutiger wanglangensis: Sichuan
- Yunnan, China
  - Scutiger gongshanensis: Gongshan County, Yunnan
- Tibet
  - Scutiger maculatus: Garze, Sichuan and Jiangda, Tibet
  - Scutiger nyingchiensis: Nyingchi Prefecture, Tibet
  - Scutiger spinosus: Medog County, Tibet and Tawang District, Arunachal Pradesh
  - Scutiger wuguanfui: Medog County, Tibet
- Bhutan
  - Scutiger bhutanensis: Bhutan
- Sikkim, India
  - Scutiger sikimmensis: Sikkim, India
