= Scutiger ghunsa =

Scientific classification
- Kingdom: Animalia
- Phylum: Chordata
- Class: Amphibia
- Order: Anura
- Family: Megophryidae
- Genus: Scutiger
- Species: S. ghunsa

Binomial name
- Scutiger ghunsa Khatiwada, Shu, Subedi, Wang, Ohler, Cannatella, Xie, and Jiang, 2019
- Scutiger ghunsa is only known from Ghunsa in the Kanchenjunga Conservation Area, Nepal

Species of amphibian

Scutiger ghunsa is a species of toad in the family Megophryidae. It is endemic to eastern Nepal and only known from its eponymous type locality, Ghunsa, in the Taplejung District. This species is also known as Ghunsa alpine toad and Ghunsa high altitude toad. Its closest relatives are Scutiger nepalensis and Scutiger sikimmensis.

== Description ==
Males measure 42–48 mm (1.7–1.9 in) and females 50–54 mm (2.0–2.1 in) in snout–vent length. The head is wider than it is long. The snout is short and rounded. The paratoid glands are large. The canthus rostralis is distinct. No tympanum is visible. The forelimbs are short and robust, while the hindlimbs are long and powerful. The finger and toe tips are rounded. The fingers have no webbing while the toes are weakly webbed. males have nuptial spines on the dorsal surface of the first three fingers. Dorsal skin in males is rough with scattered warts bearing black spines. The flanks bear larger, white warts or granules. Females have smooth skin. The upper parts are light brown. There is an olive brown triangular spot on the snout and interorbital region. The flanks are light brown, ventrally fading into creamy yellow. The ventral surfaces are creamy white with irregular, light gray-brown lines.

A male found guarding eggs under a rock suggests a degree of parental care, a behavior previously unknown for this genus. Tadpoles of Gosner stage 27 measure 28–33 mm (1.1–1.3 in) in total length, of which the tail makes two thirds. The body is oval. The upper tail fin is higher than the lower one; both converge at the pointed tail tip.

== Habitat ==
Scutiger ghunsa is known from an elevation of about 3,475 m (11,400 ft) above sea level. The locality is characterized by a mixed rhododendron forest with low canopy cover and a slow-running stream with stagnant pools.

== Conservation ==
As of late 2020, this species had not yet been assessed for the IUCN Red List of Threatened Species, but the original describers suggested that it should be considered "data deficient". The known population is within the Kanchenjunga Conservation Area. The species was named after its type locality in hope that this would raise awareness and further help to conserve the flora and fauna in the area.
