= Medog frog =

Medog frog may refer to:

- Medog bubble-nest frog, a frog found in China
- Medog eastern frog, a frog found in China and India
- Medog spiny frog, a frog endemic to Tibet, China
