= Scutiger muliensis =

Conservation status
- Endangered (IUCN 3.1)

Scientific classification
- Kingdom: Animalia
- Phylum: Chordata
- Class: Amphibia
- Order: Anura
- Family: Megophryidae
- Genus: Scutiger
- Species: S. muliensis

Binomial name
- Scutiger muliensis Fei and Ye, 1986

Species of amphibian

Scutiger muliensis is a species of amphibian in the family Megophryidae. It is endemic to Sichuan, China, where it is only known from the area of its type locality in Muli county (southwestern Sichuan), altitude 3,050–3,400 m (10,010–11,150 ft) asl. Its common name is Muli cat-eyed toad.

== Description ==
Males measure 68–80 mm (2.7–3.1 in) and females 60–68 mm (2.4–2.7 in) in snout–vent length. Tadpoles grow to 49 mm (1.9 in) in total length. Scutiger muliensis resembles Scutiger mammatus but males have black spiny warts on the chest glands that are large, few and scattered, webbing between toes is poorly developed, and there are small warts around the vent and on the ventral side of the thighs and soles.

== Habitat and conservation ==
This species' natural habitats are low-gradient streams and riparian habitats, mainly shrubland. It is threatened by habitat loss caused by overgrazing and increasing human settlement.

Scutiger muliensis is only known from the Muli county in Sichuan, China
