= Leptobrachium huashen =

Conservation status
- Least Concern (IUCN 3.1)

Scientific classification
- Kingdom: Animalia
- Phylum: Chordata
- Class: Amphibia
- Order: Anura
- Family: Megophryidae
- Genus: Leptobrachium
- Species: L. huashen

Binomial name
- Leptobrachium huashen Fei & Ye, 2005

Species of amphibian

Leptobrachium huashen is a species of amphibian in the family Megophryidae. It is found in China, and possibly Laos and Myanmar. It is widespread in southwestern Yunnan province, China, where it is found in Jingdong, Tengchong, Luchun, Menglian, Mengyang, and Mengla counties.

== Habitat ==
Its natural habitats are temperate forests and rivers. It is threatened by habitat loss.
