= Dayin, Sichuan =

Dayin 大印镇
- Town
- Dayinzhen
- Location in Sichuan
- Coordinates: 32°8′31″N 104°31′32″E
- Country: People's Republic of China
- Province: Sichuan
- Autonomous prefecture: Mianyang
- County: Pingwu County
- Time zone: UTC+8 (China Standard)
- Postal code: 622559

Dayin (Mandarin: 大两镇) is a town in Pingwu County, Mianyang, Sichuan, China.

== See also ==
- List of township-level divisions of Sichuan
