= Liurana =

Scientific classification
- Kingdom: Animalia
- Phylum: Chordata
- Class: Amphibia
- Order: Anura
- Family: Ceratobatrachidae
- Subfamily: Liuraninae; Fei, Ye, and Jiang, 2010
- Genus: Liurana; Dubois, 1987 "1986"\

Genus of amphibians

Liurana is a genus of frogs in the family Ceratobatrachidae. It is the only genus in the subfamily Liuraninae.

== Species ==
The following species are recognised in the genus Liurana:

- Liurana alpina Huang and Ye, 1997
- Liurana medogensis Fei, Ye, and Huang, 1997
- Liurana vallecula Jiang, Wang, Wang, Li, and Che, 2019
- Liurana xizangensis (Hu, 1977)
