= SCAU =

SCAU may refer to:

- Sichuan Agricultural University, a public university based in Ya'an, Sichuan, China
- South China Agricultural University, a public university in Guangzhou, Guangdong, China
