= Bao'en Si =

Bao'en Si (simplified Chinese: 报恩寺; traditional Chinese: 報恩寺; pinyin: Bào'ēn sì; lit. 'Temple of Repaying Kindness or of Thanksgiving') or Bao'en Temple is the name of several notable temples:

- Bao'en Temple (Pingwu), in Pingwu, Sichuan.
- Bao'en Temple (Suzhou), in Suzhou, Jiangsu, which includes the Beisi Pagoda.
- The Porcelain Tower of Nanjing, which forms a part of the former Bao'en Temple of Nanjing
- Poh Ern Shih Temple in Singapore
