= Scutiger pingwuensis =

Conservation status
- Endangered (IUCN 3.1)

Scientific classification
- Kingdom: Animalia
- Phylum: Chordata
- Class: Amphibia
- Order: Anura
- Family: Megophryidae
- Genus: Scutiger
- Species: S. pingwuensis

Binomial name
- Scutiger pingwuensis Liu & Tian, 1978

Species of amphibian

Scutiger pingwuensis is a species of toad in the family Megophryidae known commonly as the Pingwu lazy toad and the Pingwu alpine toad. It is endemic to Pingwu County in Sichuan, China. It lives near villages at about 2200 meters in elevation. Its habitat includes streams bordered by dense shrubs. It lays eggs under rocks in the streams.

It is a locally common species, but its range is limited, it is known from only five locations, and its population is believed to be declining. It is threatened by habitat degradation and destruction from agriculture and development as human settlement grows in the area.

Phylogenetic analyses of the genus indicate that this toad is sister species to Scutiger chintingensis.
