= Xinchangjie railway station =

Railway station in Shaanxi, China

Coordinates: 33°44′34.78″N 108°20′6.85″E

Xinchangjie 新场街站
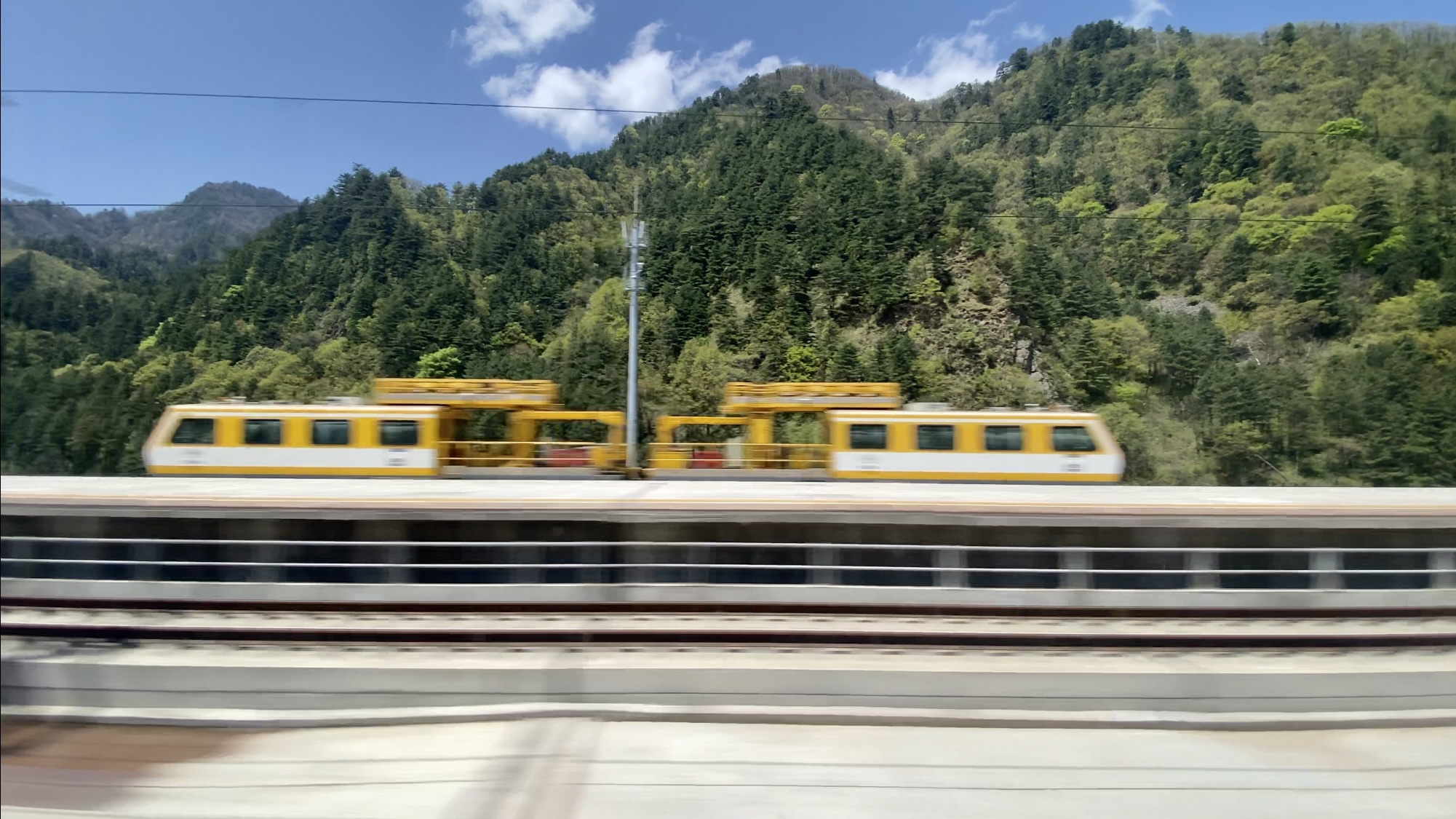
- Maintenance train at the station in 2023

General information
- Location: Xinchang Town, Ningshan County, Ankang, Shaanxi; China
- Operated by: China Railway Xi'an Group
- Line: Xi'an–Chengdu

Other information
- Station code: 47145 (TMIS); EJY (Telegraph code); XJC (Pinyin code)

History
- Opened: 2017
Location

Xinchangjie railway station (Chinese: 新场街站) is a railway station in Xinchang Town, Ningshan County, Ankang, Shaanxi, built in 2017. It is on the Xi'an–Chengdu high-speed railway.

The station stands on a bridge between two mountains. At an elevation of 1,594 metres (5,230 ft), Xinchangjie is highest station on the Xi'an–Chengdu line. In September 2017, it was closed to passengers temporarily.

Preceding station	China Railway High-speed	Following station
Huyi towards Xi'an North	Xi'an–Chengdu high-speed railway	Foping towards Chengdu East
