= Pingnan Township, Sichuan =

Pingnan Township 平通羌族乡
- Township
- Pingnanxiang
- Location in Sichuan
- Coordinates: 32°10′23″N 104°38′37″E
- Country: People's Republic of China
- Province: Sichuan
- Autonomous prefecture: Mianyang
- County: Pingwu County

Area
  - Total: 132.1 km^{2} (51.0 sq mi)

Population (2010)
  - Total: 11,819
  - Density: 89.47/km^{2} (231.7/sq mi)
- Time zone: UTC+8 (China Standard)

Pignan (Mandarin: 平通羌族乡) is a township in Pingwu County, Mianyang, Sichuan, China. In 2010, Pingnan Township had a total population of 11,819: 5,126 males and 4,694 females: 1,484 aged under 14, 7,372 aged between 15 and 65 and 964 aged over 65.
