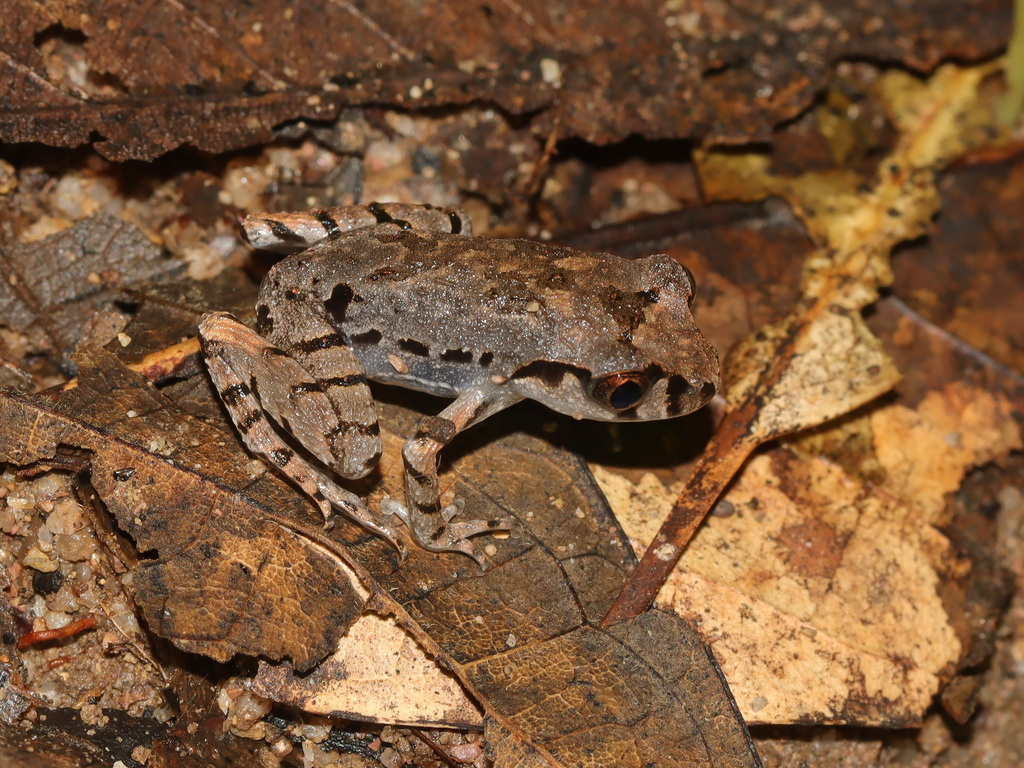

Conservation status
- Least Concern (IUCN 3.1)

Scientific classification
- Kingdom: Animalia
- Phylum: Chordata
- Class: Amphibia
- Order: Anura
- Family: Megophryidae
- Genus: Leptobrachella
- Species: L. ventripunctata

Binomial name
- Leptobrachella ventripunctata (Fei, Ye, and Li, 1990)

Synonyms
- Leptolalax ventripunctatus Fei, Ye, and Li, 1990; Paramegophrys ventripunctatus Jiang, Ye, and Fei, 2008

= Leptobrachella ventripunctata =

Species of amphibian

Leptobrachella ventripunctata (known as Yunnan Asian toad or more elaborately, speckle-bellied metacarpal-tubercled toad) is a frog species in the family Megophryidae. It is known from Mengla County in Yunnan, southern China, from Phongsaly Province in northern Laos, and from Tam Dao in northern Vietnam. Its natural habitats are evergreen forests, montane bamboo forests, and rivers. It is likely threatened by the destruction of its mature forest habitat for agriculture.

Leptobrachella ventripunctata is a small species: males grow to snout-vent length of about 26.5 mm (1.04 in). Tadpoles are larger in terms of length, 48–50 mm (1.9–2.0 in).
