= Gaocun Township, Sichuan =

Gaocun Township 高村乡
- Township
- Gaocunxiang
- Location in Sichuan
- Coordinates: 32°24′36″N 104°42′32″E
- Country: People's Republic of China
- Province: Sichuan
- Autonomous prefecture: Mianyang
- County: Pingwu County

Area
  - Total: 181.4 km^{2} (70.0 sq mi)

Population (2010)
  - Total: 5,334
  - Density: 29.40/km^{2} (76.16/sq mi)
- Time zone: UTC+8 (China Standard)

Gaocun (Mandarin: 高村乡) is a township in Pingwu County, Mianyang, Sichuan, China. In 2010, Gaocun Township had a total population of 5,334: 2,815 males and 2,519 females: 763 aged under 14, 4,006 aged between 15 and 65 and 565 aged over 65.
