= Scutiger brevipes =

Conservation status
- Data Deficient (IUCN 3.1)

Scientific classification
- Kingdom: Animalia
- Phylum: Chordata
- Class: Amphibia
- Order: Anura
- Family: Megophryidae
- Genus: Scutiger
- Species: S. brevipes

Binomial name
- Scutiger brevipes (Liu, 1950)

Species of amphibian

Scutiger brevipes is a species of amphibian in the family Megophryidae. It is endemic to China as it is only known from its type locality in Dawu County, Sichuan. It is sometimes considered to be a synonym of Scutiger glandulatus. Its lives in small forest streams and in spring-fed alpine streams.
