= Scutiger nyingchiensis =

Conservation status
- Least Concern (IUCN 3.1)

Scientific classification
- Kingdom: Animalia
- Phylum: Chordata
- Class: Amphibia
- Order: Anura
- Family: Megophryidae
- Genus: Scutiger
- Species: S. nyingchiensis

Binomial name
- Scutiger nyingchiensis Fei, 1977

Species of amphibian

Scutiger nyingchiensis is a species of toad found in the Himalayas of southeastern Tibet (China), northwestern Nepal, and tentatively, Bhutan. There are no confirmed records from India; earlier records refer to Scutiger occidentalis or Scutiger spinosus. Its type locality is Nyingchi, Tibet. It is also known as the Nyingchi high altitude toad, Nyingchi alpine toad, or Nyingchi lazy toad.

== Description ==
A medium-sized Scutiger, adult males of S. nyingchiensis measure 41–56 mm (1.6–2.2 in) and adult females 55–74 mm (2.2–2.9 in) in snout–vent length. Maxillary teeth are present. The toes are webbed. Males lack a vocal sac.

== Habitat and conservation ==
The altitudinal range of Scutiger nyingchiensis is 2,730–4,560 m (8,960–14,960 ft) above sea level. Scutiger nyingchiensis, in the sense of including Scutiger occidentalis, is an alpine species associated with streams in moist, forested, and grassland habitats in hilly areas. Breeding takes place in low-gradient streams and pools. The eggs are laid under fallen logs or under stones, and the tadpoles continue their development over the winter. Scutiger nyingchiensis is locally common but potentially threatened by diversion of water from breeding streams for agricultural use and by water pollution associated with agrochemicals.
