= Scutiger wanglangensis =

Scientific classification
- Kingdom: Animalia
- Phylum: Chordata
- Class: Amphibia
- Order: Anura
- Family: Megophryidae
- Genus: Scutiger
- Species: S. wanglangensis

Binomial name
- Scutiger wanglangensis Ye and Fei, 2007

Species of amphibian

Scutiger wanglangensis is a species of amphibian in the family Megophryidae. It is endemic to China and found in Sichuan and Gansu.
