= Scutiger jiulongensis =

Conservation status
- Endangered (IUCN 3.1)

Scientific classification
- Kingdom: Animalia
- Phylum: Chordata
- Class: Amphibia
- Order: Anura
- Family: Megophryidae
- Genus: Scutiger
- Species: S. jiulongensis

Binomial name
- Scutiger jiulongensis Fei, Ye & Jiang, 1999

Species of frog

Scutiger jiulongensis, also known as Juilong cat-eyed toad, is a species of frog in the family Megophryidae. It is endemic to Jiulong County in southern Sichuan Province, China. Its natural habitats are subtropical or tropical moist montane forests, rivers, swamps, and freshwater marshes.
