= Scutiger liupanensis =

Conservation status
- Endangered (IUCN 3.1)

Scientific classification
- Kingdom: Animalia
- Phylum: Chordata
- Class: Amphibia
- Order: Anura
- Family: Megophryidae
- Genus: Scutiger
- Species: S. liupanensis

Binomial name
- Scutiger liupanensis (Huang, 1985)

Species of amphibian

Scutiger liupanensis is a species of amphibian in the family Megophryidae. It is endemic to Liupanshan National Nature Reserve in Jingyuan County, Ningxia Hui Autonomous Region, China. Its natural habitats are subtropical or tropical moist montane forests and rivers. It is threatened by habitat loss.
