= Scutiger tengchongensis =

Scientific classification
- Kingdom: Animalia
- Phylum: Chordata
- Class: Amphibia
- Order: Anura
- Family: Megophryidae
- Genus: Scutiger
- Species: S. tengchongensis

Binomial name
- Scutiger tengchongensis Yang & Huang, 2019

Species of frog

Scutiger tengchongensis, the Tengchong lazy toad, is a toad species of the Scutiger genus. It's endemic to China. The species was scientifically described in 2019.
