= Scutiger wuguanfui =

Scientific classification
- Kingdom: Animalia
- Phylum: Chordata
- Class: Amphibia
- Order: Anura
- Family: Megophryidae
- Genus: Scutiger
- Species: S. wuguanfui

Binomial name
- Scutiger wuguanfui Jiang, Rao, Yuan, Wang, Li, Hou, Che, and Che, 2012
- Scutiger wuguanfui is only known from the Medog County in Tibet

Species of amphibian

Scutiger wuguanfui is a species of toad in the family Megophryidae. It is endemic to Tibet and only known from its type locality in the Medog County. The specific name wuguanfui honours Wu Guanfu, a Chinese herpetologist. Common names Wu's lazy toad, Medog lazy toad and Medog cat-eyed toad have been coined for it.

== Description ==
Adult males measure 78–84 mm (3.1–3.3 in) and adult females, based on a single specimen only, 117 mm (4.6 in) in snout–vent length. The body is stout and the head is large. There is no tympanum, but the supratympanic fold is distinct. The forelimbs are comparatively long. The fingers have rounded tips and are free of webbing. The hind limbs are comparatively short. The toes have rounded tips and weakly developed dermal fringes and webbing. Skin is rough. The dorsum is dark brown, becoming lighter on the flanks. The loreal real region as well as the supratympanic fold are brownish-black. The lips are light brown. The belly is grayish-brown. Males have a single internal subgular vocal sac.

The male advertisement call is a loud, toneless croaking like "ong...ong...ong...".

== Habitat and conservation ==
The type series was collected in a sluggish stream in mixed broadleaf–conifer forest at an elevation of 2,705 m (8,875 ft) above sea level. Individuals were hiding under the logs in daytime but became active after sundown, squatting on leaf litter or peering from under the fallen trees. Males call throughout the night, sometimes even in the afternoon.

As of late 2018, this species had not been included in the IUCN Red List of Threatened Species.
