= Ye Changyuan =

Chinese herpetologist (born 1936)

- 叶昌媛
- Born: 1936 (age 89–90)
- Education: Sichuan Agricultural University
- Known for: Discovery of 126 new species and records of amphibians
- Spouse: Fei Liang (m. 1963; died 2022)
- Scientific career
- Fields: Herpetology
- Workplaces: Chinese Academy of Sciences

Ye Changyuan (Chinese: 叶昌媛; born 1936) is an amphibian expert in the People's Republic of China and a researcher at the Amphibian and Reptile Laboratory of the Chengdu Institute of Biology, Chinese Academy of Sciences.

== Biography ==
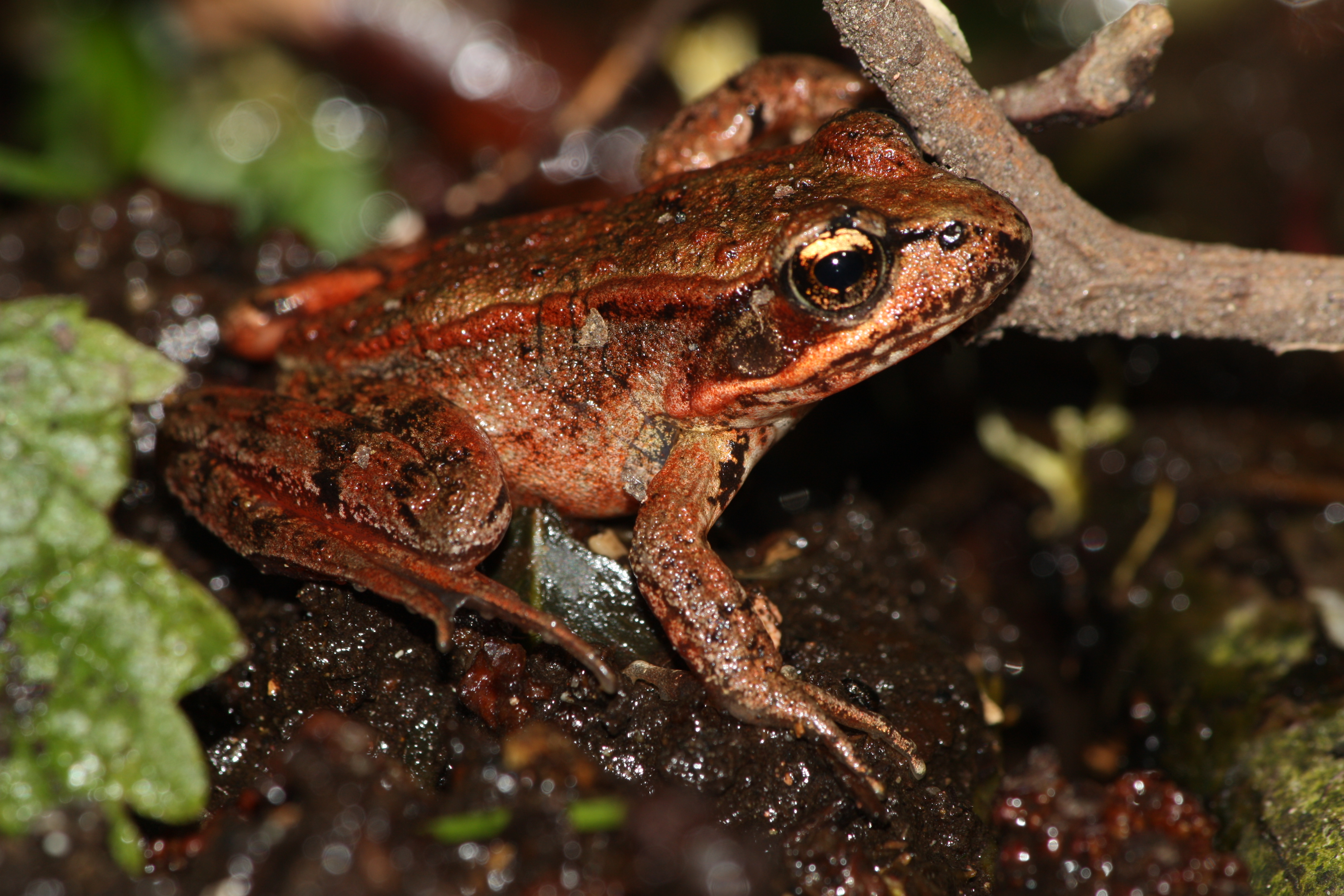
Kurixalus odontotarsus (Serrate-legged small treefrog)

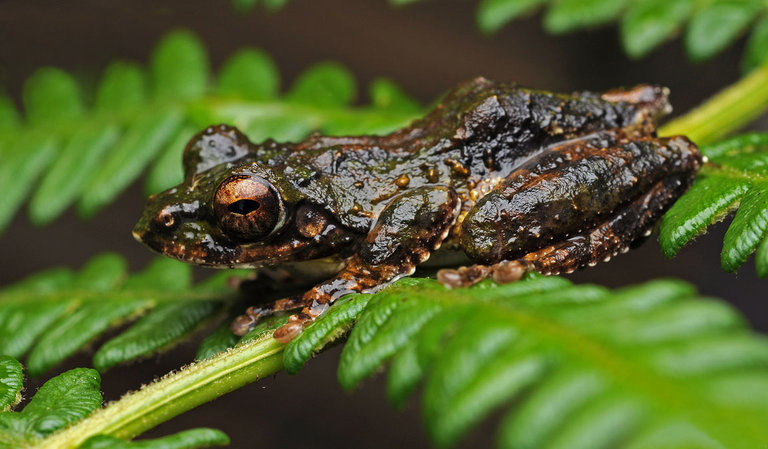
Kurixalus, Genus of amphibians

In 1956, Ye Changyuan was admitted to the Animal Husbandry Major of Sichuan Agricultural College (now Sichuan Agricultural University). After graduation in 1961, she entered the Institute of Agricultural Biology, Sichuan Branch of the Chinese Academy of Sciences (now the Chengdu Institute of Biology, Chinese Academy of Sciences) and began amphibian research. Her husband, Fei Liang, is a research partner and a fellow amphibian expert. They met at the university and married in 1963.

She initially served as assistant to amphibian research experts Liu Chengzhao and Hu Shuqin.

Ye Changyuan suspended her scientific field research work in 1964 after becoming pregnant. To continue her work, Ye Changyuan and her husband cooperated to meet their own individual work needs. One of them would primarily go into the field to collect specimens, and the other would stay at home to compile the resulting field data.

According to Xinhua News Agency, the pair continued their field research despite conditions.

"Due to the nature of their work, the couple, who want to fill gaps in amphibian research for the country, have become a 'routine' for them to work in the field. Going from spring to winter and returning home, walking for more than half a year has been their normal work for decades; peas are the staple food, peppers are vegetables, living in tents and sleeping in granaries are a true portrayal of their field work; traveling through deserts, walking on plateaus, and exploring mountains and forests, they searched all over the country."

Since 1980, the wife and husband herpetology team discovered 126 new species and records of amphibians. They established a new family and five new subfamilies, and a fifth tadpole type was defined.

Although both researchers retired in the 1990's, they jointly published a 1,040-page tome titled "Amphibians of China" (Volume 1) in 2016. Ye's husband, Fei Liang, died at 86 in Chengdu, China, on 4 June 2022.

== Taxon named in her honor ==
To commemorate Ye Changyuan's contribution to the classification of amphibians, the scientific name of the new genus Yerana established in 2006 was taken from her surname "Ye."

- Quasipaa yei (Chen, Qu' & Jiang, 2002)

== Some Taxa described by Ye ==
- Bombina lichuanensis
- Brachytarsophrys chuannanensis
- Ingerana alpina
- Ingerana medogensis
- Kurixalus
- Kurixalus odontotarsus
- Leptobrachium hainanense
- Leptobrachium huashen
- Leptolalax alpinus
- Leptolalax liui
- Leptolalax ventripunctatus
- Limnonectes fujianensis
- Odorrana exiliversabilis
- Odorrana junlianensis
- Oreolalax granulosus
- Oreolalax nanjiangensis
- Paa chayuensis
- Paa medogensis
- Parapelophryne
- Pseudoamolops
- Rana chevronta
- Rana hainanensis
- Rana huanrenensis
- Rana hubeiensis
- Rana jingdongensis
- Rana nasuta
- Rana omeimontis
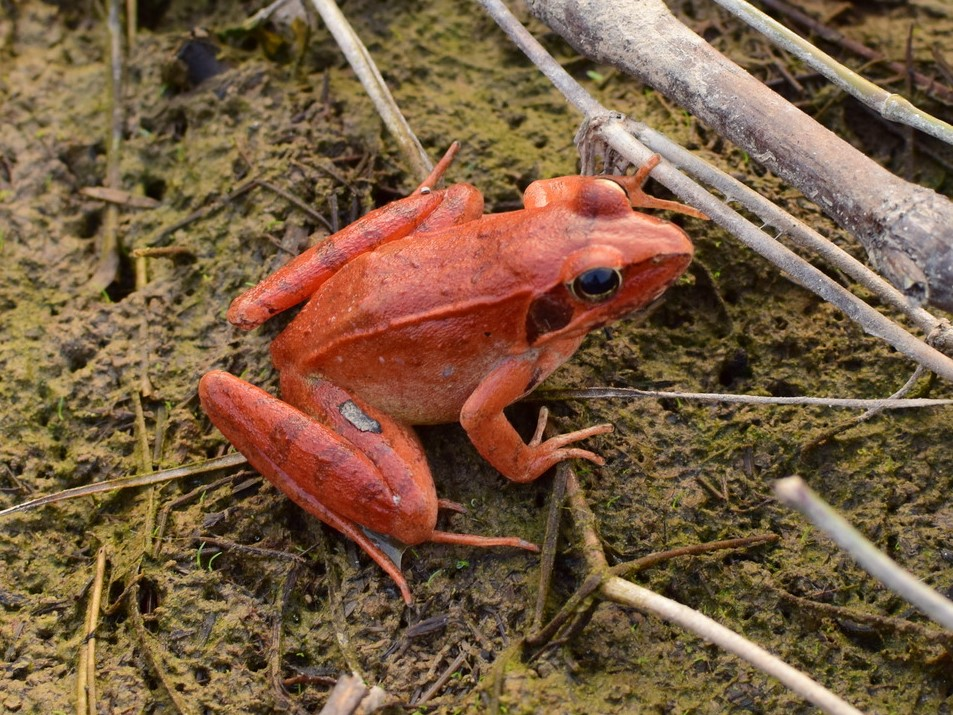
  Zhenhai Brown Frog (Rana zhenhaiensis)
- Rana zhenhaiensis
- Scutiger jiulongensis
- Scutiger muliensis
- Xenophrys binchuanensis
- Xenophrys glandulosa
- Xenophrys huangshanensis
- Xenophrys jingdongensis
- Xenophrys mangshanensis
- Xenophrys medogensis
- Xenophrys sangzhiensis
- Xenophrys wawuensis
- Xenophrys wuliangshanensis
- Xenophrys wushanensis
- Xenophrys zhangi
