= Scutiger tuberculatus =

Conservation status
- Vulnerable (IUCN 3.1)

Scientific classification
- Kingdom: Animalia
- Phylum: Chordata
- Class: Amphibia
- Order: Anura
- Family: Megophryidae
- Genus: Scutiger
- Species: S. tuberculatus

Binomial name
- Scutiger tuberculatus Liu & Fei, 1979

Species of amphibian

Scutiger tuberculatus is a species of amphibian in the family Megophryidae. It is endemic to Sichuan, China, where it is only known from Yuexi, Mianning, and Xichang counties. It is found in Luojishan Nature Reserve and Panzhihua-Sutielin Nature Reserve.

Its natural habitats are temperate forests, temperate grassland, rivers, swamps, and freshwater marshes. It is threatened by habitat loss.
