= Liurana alpina =

Conservation status
- Vulnerable (IUCN 3.1)

Scientific classification
- Kingdom: Animalia
- Phylum: Chordata
- Class: Amphibia
- Order: Anura
- Family: Ceratobatrachidae
- Genus: Liurana
- Species: L. alpina

Binomial name
- Liurana alpina (Huang and Ye, 1997)

Synonyms
- Liurana alpinus Huang and Ye, 1997; Liurana alpina Huang and Ye, 1997; Ingerana alpina (Huang and Ye, 1997); Limnonectes alpinus (Huang and Ye, 1997)

Species of frog

Liurana alpina is a species of frog in the family Ceratobatrachidae. It is endemic to China and only known from its type locality, Dayandong in Mêdog County, Tibet. This little known species lives under moss in forest at about 3,100 m (10,200 ft) asl.
