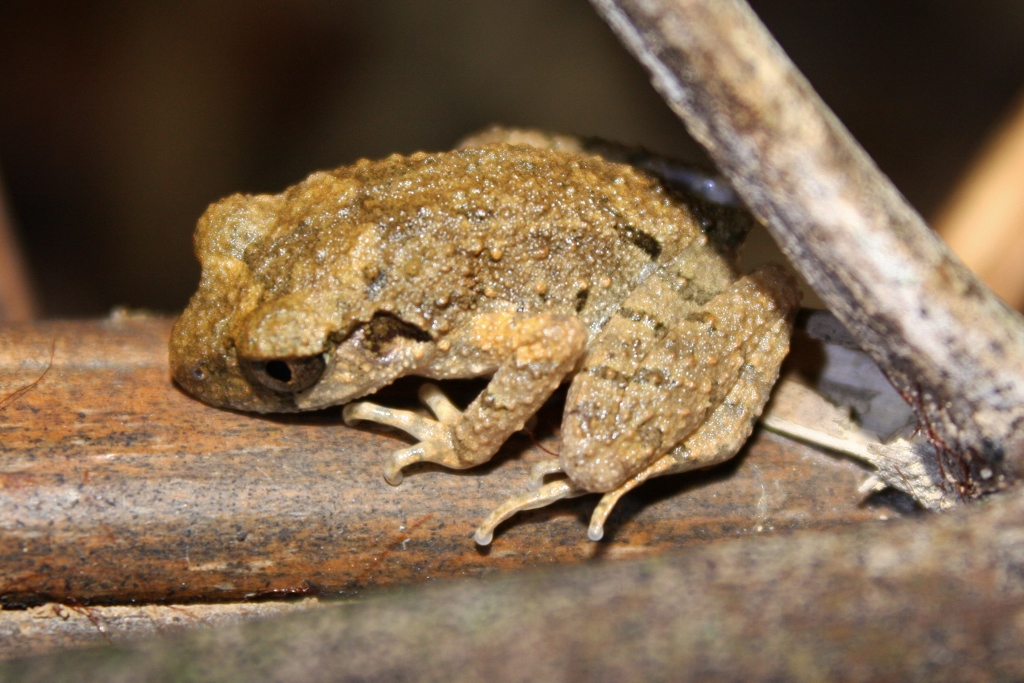

Conservation status
- Least Concern (IUCN 3.1)

Scientific classification
- Kingdom: Animalia
- Phylum: Chordata
- Class: Amphibia
- Order: Anura
- Family: Megophryidae
- Genus: Leptobrachella
- Species: L. liui

Binomial name
- Leptobrachella liui (Fei and Fei, 1990)

Synonyms
- Leptolalax liui Fei and Ye, 1990; Paramegophrys liui (Fei and Ye, 1990)

= Leptobrachella liui =

Species of amphibian

Leptobrachella liui, also known as Fujian Asian toad or Fujian metacarpal-tubercled toad, is a frog species in the family Megophryidae. Originally described from Chong'an in Fujian (present Wuyishan City), it is now known to be widely distributed in southern and southeastern China from Zhejiang and Fujian west to Guizhou and Guangxi.

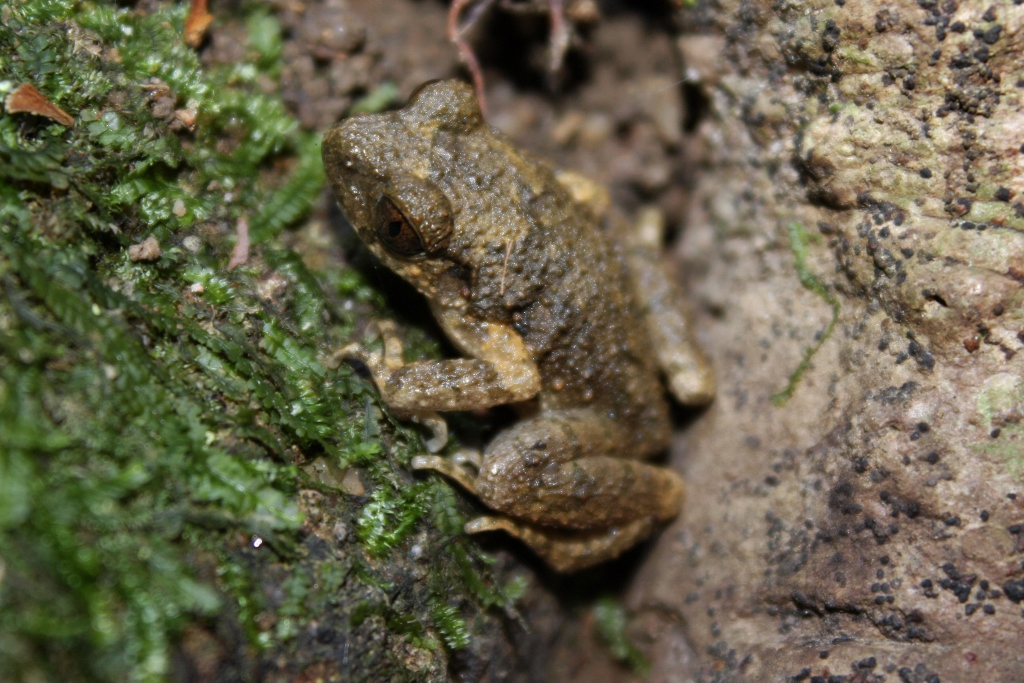
L. liui from Tai Po Kau, Hong Kong.

== Description ==
Leptobrachella liui males grow to snout–vent length of 23–27 mm (0.91–1.06 in) and females to 25–28 mm (0.98–1.10 in). The toes have wide fringes and some webbing. The dorsum is grey brown with spots, with indistinct spots on the sides. The venter is immaculate. The iris is brownish.

The tadpoles are 40–55 mm (1.6–2.2 in) long.

== Habitat and conservation ==
Leptobrachella liui occurs in hill streams and the surrounding forests and high-altitude grasslands at elevations of 110–1,400 m (360–4,590 ft) above sea level. Breeding takes place in streams. It is not considered threatened by the IUCN, although it can locally suffer from habitat destruction and degradation.
