= Liurana vallecula =

Conservation status
- Data Deficient (IUCN 3.1)

Scientific classification
- Kingdom: Animalia
- Phylum: Chordata
- Class: Amphibia
- Order: Anura
- Family: Ceratobatrachidae
- Genus: Liurana
- Species: L. vallecula

Binomial name
- Liurana vallecula Jiang, Wang, Wang, Li, and Che, 2019

Species of frog

The valley papilla-tongued frog (Liurana vallecula) is a frog in the family Ceratobatrachidae endemic to Tibet. Scientists know it exclusively from the type locality in Medog County. Scientists have seen it 550 meters above sea level.

== Appearance ==
The adult frog measures 14.6 to 20.4 mm in snout-vent length. The skin of the dorsum is red-brown in color. This frog has a white belly with dark spots or mottling. There are dark bars across the legs and no webbed skin on any of the feet.

== Threats ==
This frog lives in Medog County, which has been subject to cosniderable human-induced habitat loss.

== Etymology ==
Scientists named this frog vallecula in Latin for "valley-dwelling." They also named it He Gu She Tu Wa (河谷舌突蛙) in Chinese and valley papilla-tongued frog in English.
