= Scutiger gongshanensis =

Conservation status
- Least Concern (IUCN 3.1)

Scientific classification
- Kingdom: Animalia
- Phylum: Chordata
- Class: Amphibia
- Order: Anura
- Family: Megophryidae
- Genus: Scutiger
- Species: S. gongshanensis

Binomial name
- Scutiger gongshanensis Yang and Su In Yang, Su, and Li, 1979

Species of amphibian

Scutiger gongshanensis is a species of toad that is found in the Gongshan County and Biluoxueshan 碧罗雪山 of Deqen County in Yunnan, China. Part of its range is within the Gaoligongshan National Nature Reserve.
