= Scutiger adungensis =

Conservation status
- Data Deficient (IUCN 3.1)

Scientific classification
- Kingdom: Animalia
- Phylum: Chordata
- Class: Amphibia
- Order: Anura
- Family: Megophryidae
- Genus: Scutiger
- Species: S. adungensis

Binomial name
- Scutiger adungensis Dubois, 1979

Species of frog

Scutiger adungensis is a species of frog in the family Megophryidae. It is only known with certainty from two specimens collected in 1931 from Adung Valley in northern Myanmar, near the border to Tibet; there are more recent unconfirmed sightings. Common name Adung lazy toad has been coined for it.

== Description ==
The type series consists of two adult males measuring 71 and 73 mm (2.8 and 2.9 in) in snout–vent length. The head is as broad as it is wide and relatively flat. The snout is rounded. Tympanum is absent. Lateral parotoid glands are present. The limbs are relatively short; the fingers and toes have no webbing. Skin in the upper parts of the body bears pustules, while the limbs are granular. The upper parts are dark, with a darker triangular area between the eyes pointing backward. The lower parts are lighter and without pattern.

== Habitat and conservation ==
Scutiger adungensis occurs in mountain streams (presumably, its breeding habitat) in Adung Valley at elevations of 3,650 m (11,980 ft) above sea level. There are also more recent sightings from the Hkakabo Razi National Park, but no specimens have been collected.
