= Scutiger maculatus =

Conservation status
- Critically endangered, possibly extinct (IUCN 3.1)

Scientific classification
- Kingdom: Animalia
- Phylum: Chordata
- Class: Amphibia
- Order: Anura
- Family: Megophryidae
- Genus: Scutiger
- Species: S. maculatus

Binomial name
- Scutiger maculatus (Liu, 1950)

Species of frog

Scutiger maculatus, the spotted lazy toad or Piebald alpine toad, is a species of frog in the family Megophryidae. It is endemic to China where it is known from Garze, northwestern Sichuan and Jiangda, eastern Tibet. Its natural habitats are temperate forests, temperate shrubland, subtropical or tropical high-altitude grassland, and rivers. It is threatened by habitat loss.
