= Scutiger bhutanensis =

Conservation status
- Data Deficient (IUCN 3.1)

Scientific classification
- Kingdom: Animalia
- Phylum: Chordata
- Class: Amphibia
- Order: Anura
- Family: Megophryidae
- Genus: Scutiger
- Species: S. bhutanensis

Binomial name
- Scutiger bhutanensis Dubois & Dubois, 2001

Species of frog

Scutiger bhutanensis is a species of frog in the family Megophryidae, endemic to Bhutan. Its natural habitat is rivers.
