= Nanorana medogensis =

Conservation status
- Endangered (IUCN 3.1)

Scientific classification
- Kingdom: Animalia
- Phylum: Chordata
- Class: Amphibia
- Order: Anura
- Family: Dicroglossidae
- Genus: Nanorana
- Species: N. medogensis

Binomial name
- Nanorana medogensis (Fei and Ye, 1999)

Synonyms
- Paa medogensis Fei and Ye, 1999

Species of amphibian

Nanorana medogensis (common name: Medog spiny frog) is a species of frog in the family Dicroglossidae. It is endemic to Tibet, China, and only known from near its type locality in Mêdog County in southeastern Tibet, near the Indian border. It lives in forested streams, and is sometimes also found at the edges of pools and ponds.

Nanorana medogensis are relatively large frogs: males grow to a snout–vent length of about 71 mm (2.8 in) and females to 114 mm (4.5 in). Tadpoles are up to 68 mm (2.7 in) in length.
