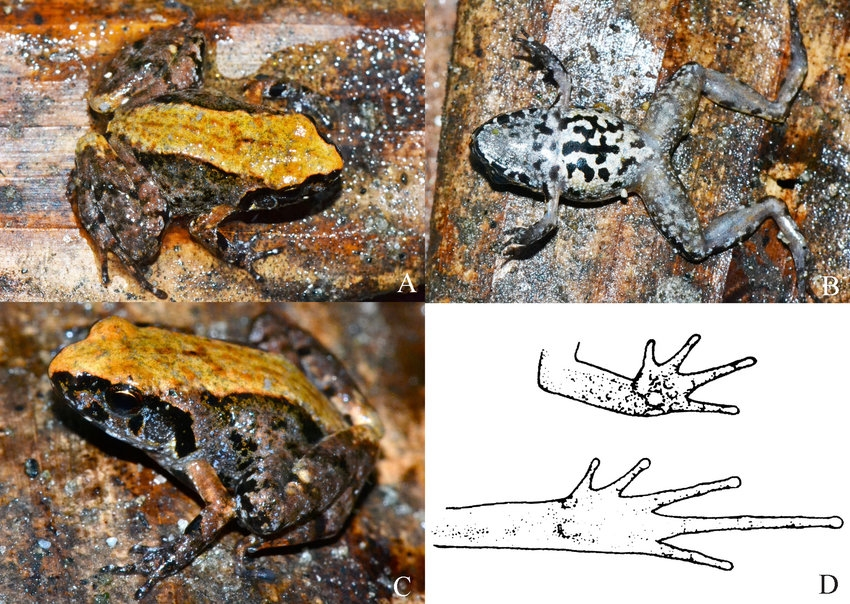

Conservation status
- Least Concern (IUCN 3.1)

Scientific classification
- Kingdom: Animalia
- Phylum: Chordata
- Class: Amphibia
- Order: Anura
- Family: Ceratobatrachidae
- Genus: Liurana
- Species: L. medogensis

Binomial name
- Liurana medogensis Fei, Ye, and Huang, 1997

Synonyms
- Ingerana medogensis (Fei, Ye, and Huang, 1997); Limnonectes medogensis (Fei, Ye, and Huang, 1997)

= Liurana medogensis =

Species of amphibian

Liurana medogensis, commonly known as Medog papilla-tongued frog or Medog eastern frog, is a species of frog in the family Ceratobatrachidae. It is found in Mêdog County, Tibet (China) and in Arunachal Pradesh, northeastern India. However, the records from India might represent another species, and the IUCN SSC Amphibian Specialist Group (2020) does not include them in the range of this species.

== Description ==
This species is only known from four adult specimens. Males (the type series from the Mêdog County) measure 14–18 mm (0.55–0.71 in) in snout–vent length and females (from Arunachal Pradesh) 21 mm (0.83 in) in SVL. One of the females had three large eggs visible through its skin; this suggests that the species has direct development (i.e, there is no free-living larval stage) and does not depend on water bodies for reproduction. Other observations suggest instead larval development in water.

== Habitat ==
Liurana medogensis has been found in both undisturbed and disturbed forest habitats. As delimited for the IUCN Red List of Threatened Species, it inhabits the leaf litter of tropical moist forest at the edge of Xigong Lake at about 1,500 m (4,900 ft) above sea level, although its elevational range is expected to be much wider.
