= Scutiger occidentalis =

Scientific classification
- Kingdom: Animalia
- Phylum: Chordata
- Class: Amphibia
- Order: Anura
- Family: Megophryidae
- Genus: Scutiger
- Species: S. occidentalis

Binomial name
- Scutiger occidentalis Dubois, 1978

Species of amphibian

Scutiger occidentalis is a species of toad found in the Western Himalayas of Pakistan (Gilgit Baltistan) and northwestern India (Ladakh, Himachal Pradesh). It has often been treated as a synonym of Scutiger nyingchiensis (by, e.g., IUCN in 2004), but molecular data show that these species are distinct. It is also known as the Ladakh high altitude toad, Ladakh pelobatid toad, western pelobatid toad, or Asian lazy toad. It is the most western member of its genus.

== Description ==
A large-sized Scutiger, adult males of S. occidentalis measure 57–70 mm (2.2–2.8 in) and adult females 63–72 mm (2.5–2.8 in) in snout–vent length. The snout is relatively short.

A Gosner stage 25 tadpole measured 8.9 mm (0.4 in) in snout–vent length and 22.5 mm (0.9 in) in total length.

== Habitat and conservation ==
S. occidentalis inhabits high-mountain regions at elevations between 2,680 and 4,300 m (8,790 and 14,110 ft) above sea level. A tadpole was found from a 0.5-metre deep pool under a waterfall.

As of October 2021, S. occidentalis has only been included in the IUCN Red List of Threatened Species as a synonym of S. nyingchiensis, corresponding to the western part of its range. S. nyingchiensis was assessed as a "least-concern species" in 2004.
