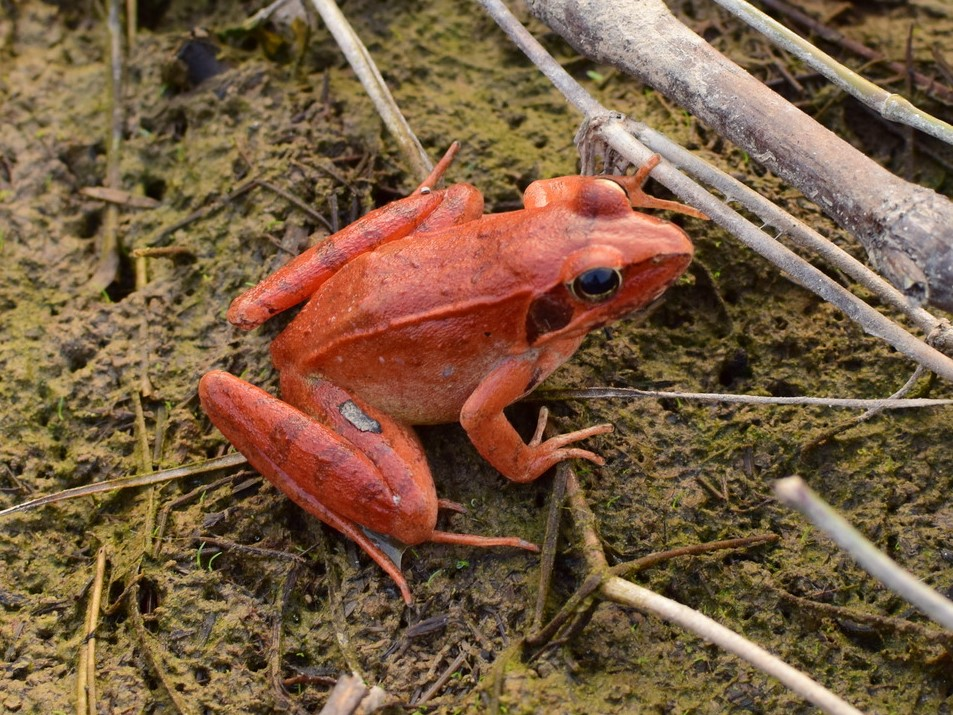

Conservation status
- Least Concern (IUCN 3.1)

Scientific classification
- Kingdom: Animalia
- Phylum: Chordata
- Class: Amphibia
- Order: Anura
- Family: Ranidae
- Genus: Rana
- Species: R. zhenhaiensis

Binomial name
- Rana zhenhaiensis Ye, Fei & Matsui, 1995

= Zhenhai brown frog =

Species of amphibian

The Zhenhai brown frog (Rana zhenhaiensis) is a species of frog in the family Ranidae endemic to China. Its natural habitats are subtropical or tropical moist lowland forests, montane forests, dry lowland grasslands, intermittent freshwater marshes, ponds, and irrigated land. It is not considered threatened by the IUCN.
