= Baima Tibetan Ethnic Township =

Baima Tibetan Ethnic Township 白马藏族乡
- Ethnic township
- Location in Sichuan
- Coordinates: 32°44′32″N 104°19′22″E
- Country: People's Republic of China
- Province: Sichuan
- Prefecture-level city: Mianyang
- County: Pingwu County

Area
  - Total: 784.66 km^{2} (302.96 sq mi)

Population (2018)
  - Total: 1,577
  - Density: 2.010/km^{2} (5.205/sq mi)
- Time zone: China Standard

Baima Tibetan Ethnic Township (simplified Chinese: 白马藏族乡; traditional Chinese: 白馬藏族鄉; pinyin: Báimǎ Zàng Zú Xiāng) is an ethnic township for Tibetan people under the administration of Pingwu County in northern Sichuan province, China. The Baima language, a threatened language with approximately 10,000 speakers, is spoken in the ethnic township. The ethnic township spans an area of 784.66 square kilometres (302.96 mi^{2}), and has a population of 1,577 as of 2018.

== Administrative divisions ==
As of 2020, it has four villages under its administration:

- Yiwadaire Village (伊瓦岱惹村)
- Eli Village (厄哩村)
- Gaoshinao Village (稿史脑村)
- Yazhezaozu Village (亚者造祖村)

== See also ==
- List of township-level divisions of Sichuan
