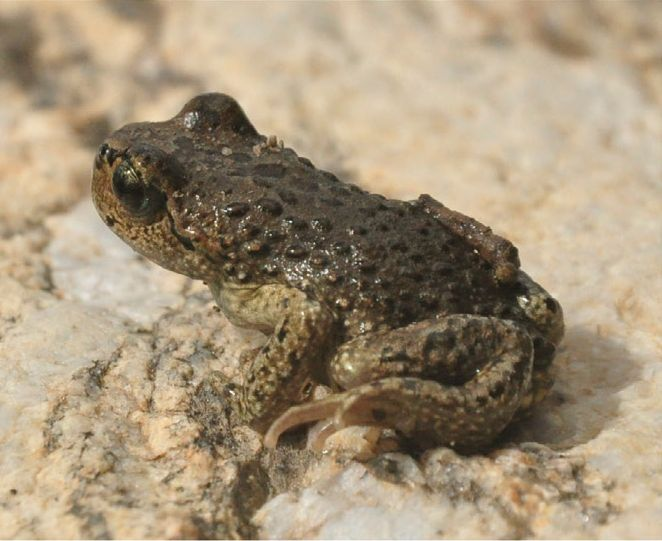

Conservation status
- Least Concern (IUCN 3.1)

Scientific classification
- Kingdom: Animalia
- Phylum: Chordata
- Class: Amphibia
- Order: Anura
- Family: Megophryidae
- Genus: Scutiger
- Species: S. boulengeri

Binomial name
- Scutiger boulengeri (Bedriaga, 1898)

Synonyms
- Leptobrachium boulengeri Bedriaga, 1898

= Scutiger boulengeri =

Species of amphibian

Scutiger boulengeri (common names: Boulenger's lazy toad, Boulenger's high altitude toad, Himalayan stream frog, and Xizang alpine toad) is a species of toad in the family Megophryidae. It is found in Nepal, India (Sikkim), and western China (Sichuan, Yunnan, Gansu, Qinghai, and Tibet).

== Description ==
Scutiger boulengeri males measure about 45–55 mm (1.8–2.2 in) and females about 50–62 mm (2.0–2.4 in) in snout–vent length. The head is flat, wider than long, and with a rounded snout. The eyes are protruding. The tympanum is indistinct; the supratympanal fold is present. The dorsum is olive or greenish-grey with numerous warts. The ventrum is yellowish. The fingers have no webbing and the toes have rudimentary webbing.

Tadpoles grow to a length of about 60 mm (2.4 in).

== Habitat and conservation ==
Scutiger boulengeri is an alpine species that lives near streams and lakes in grassland habitats at elevations of 3,300–5,270 m (10,830–17,290 ft) above sea level. A healthy population has been found at an elevation of 5,270 m (17,290 ft) in the Gurudongmar Lake complex in Sikkimese Himalaya. This is one of the highest elevations where amphibians have ever been recorded. They hibernate in loose soil from September to March or April.

Scutiger boulengeri is not considered threatened and is ranked as a species of least concern by the IUCN Red List.
