= Pelophylax hubeiensis =

Conservation status
- Least Concern (IUCN 3.1)

Scientific classification
- Kingdom: Animalia
- Phylum: Chordata
- Class: Amphibia
- Order: Anura
- Family: Ranidae
- Genus: Pelophylax
- Species: P. hubeiensis

Binomial name
- Pelophylax hubeiensis (Fei & Ye, 1982)
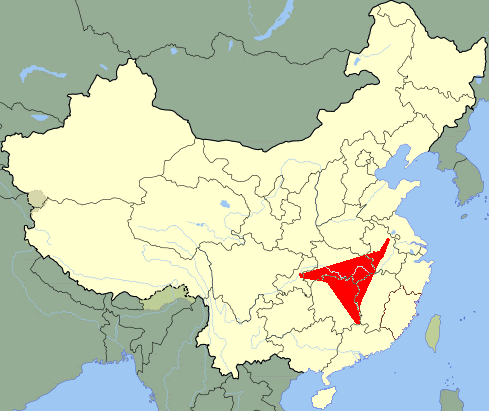

Synonyms
- Rana hubeiensis Fei & Ye, 1982

Species of frog

Pelophylax hubeiensis is a species of frog in the family Ranidae. It is endemic to China.

Its natural habitats are freshwater marshes, ponds, irrigated land, and seasonally flooded agricultural land. It is not considered threatened by the IUCN.
