= Daqiao, Pingwu County =

Daqiao 大桥镇
- Town
- Location in Sichuan
- Coordinates: 32°22′45″N 104°20′15″E
- Country: People's Republic of China
- Province: Sichuan
- Prefecture-level city: Mianyang
- County: Pingwu
- Village-level divisions: 1 residential community 13 villages
- Elevation: 1,239 m (4,065 ft)
- Time zone: UTC+8 (China Standard)

Daqiao (simplified Chinese: 大桥; traditional Chinese: 大橋; pinyin: Dàqiáo; lit. 'great or large bridge') is a town in Pingwu County in a mountainous part of northern Sichuan province, China, located 18 km (11 mi) west-southwest of the county seat. As of 2018, it has one residential community (社区) and 13 villages under its administration.
