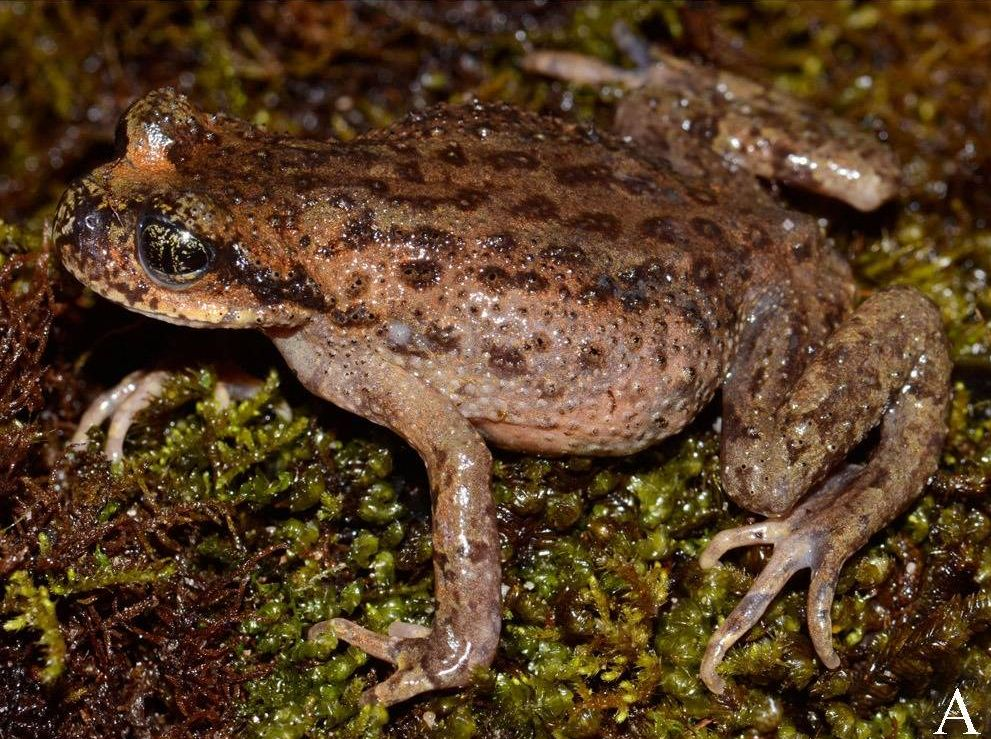
- Adult female Scutiger spinosus

Scientific classification
- Kingdom: Animalia
- Phylum: Chordata
- Class: Amphibia
- Order: Anura
- Family: Megophryidae
- Genus: Scutiger
- Species: S. spinosus

Binomial name
- Scutiger spinosus Jiang, Wang, Li, and Che, 2016

= Scutiger spinosus =

Species of amphibian

Scutiger spinosus is a species of toad in the family Megophryidae. It is found in Medog County, Tibet (China) and in Tawang district, Arunachal Pradesh (India). Prior to its description in 2016, it was confused with Scutiger nyingchiensis. Common name spiny lazy toad has been coined for it.

== Description ==
Adult males measure 51–56 mm (2.0–2.2 in) and adult females 54–57 mm (2.1–2.2 in) in snout–vent length. The body is slightly compressed and the head is large. The snout is rounded. Tympanum is totally absent, but the supratympanic fold is distinct. The forelimbs are long whereas the hindlimbs are moderately short. The finger and the toe tips are rounded; the toes have rudimentary webbing. Skin is dorsally very rough and largely covered with tubercles, many of them bearing black spines. Ventral skin is mostly smooth. The upper surfaces are dark brownish gray; the flanks are light brown. There is a triangular pattern on the head, and the sides of the head are dark brown. The upper lip is creamy white with irregular brown mottling. Ventral surfaces are uniform light yellow.

Males have stronger forearms and, in breeding condition, more spines than females. Vocal sac is absent.

== Habitat and conservation ==
Scutiger spinosus occurs in high-altitude mixed forests at elevations of 2,705–4,169 m (8,875–13,678 ft) above sea level. Breeding takes place in slow-flowing streams and small to medium-sized, permanent ponds. The eggs are deposited in doughnut-shaped masses attached to the lower surfaces of logs and rocks. Tadpoles require more than one year to reach metamorphosis and thus overwinter.

As of late 2018, this species had not been included in the IUCN Red List of Threatened Species.
