= Scutiger ningshanensis =

Conservation status
- Least Concern (IUCN 3.1)

Scientific classification
- Kingdom: Animalia
- Phylum: Chordata
- Class: Amphibia
- Order: Anura
- Family: Megophryidae
- Genus: Scutiger
- Species: S. ningshanensis

Binomial name
- Scutiger ningshanensis Fang, 1985

Species of amphibian

Scutiger ningshanensis is a species of toad in the family Megophryidae known commonly as the Ningshan lazy toad and Ningshan alpine toad. It is endemic to Ningshan County in Shaanxi, China. It is a poorly known species; only two specimens have been collected, both from one location. The species has been recorded in grassy habitat near forest streams at up to 2550 meters in elevation. It may face threats from small-scale farming in the area.
