= Dougong =

Architectural element in East Asian structures

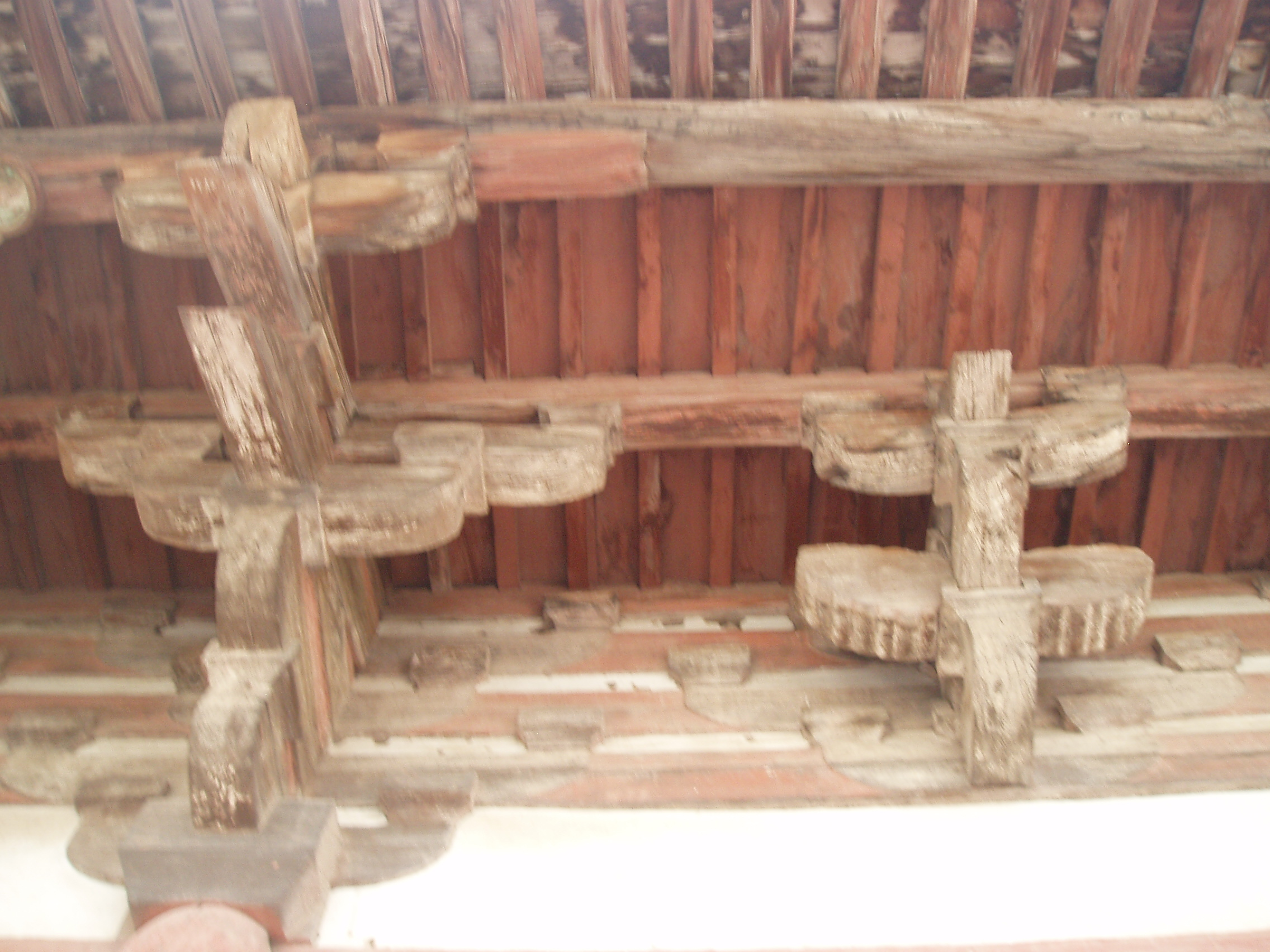
Dougong inside the East Hall timber hall of Foguang Temple, built in 857 during the Tang dynasty

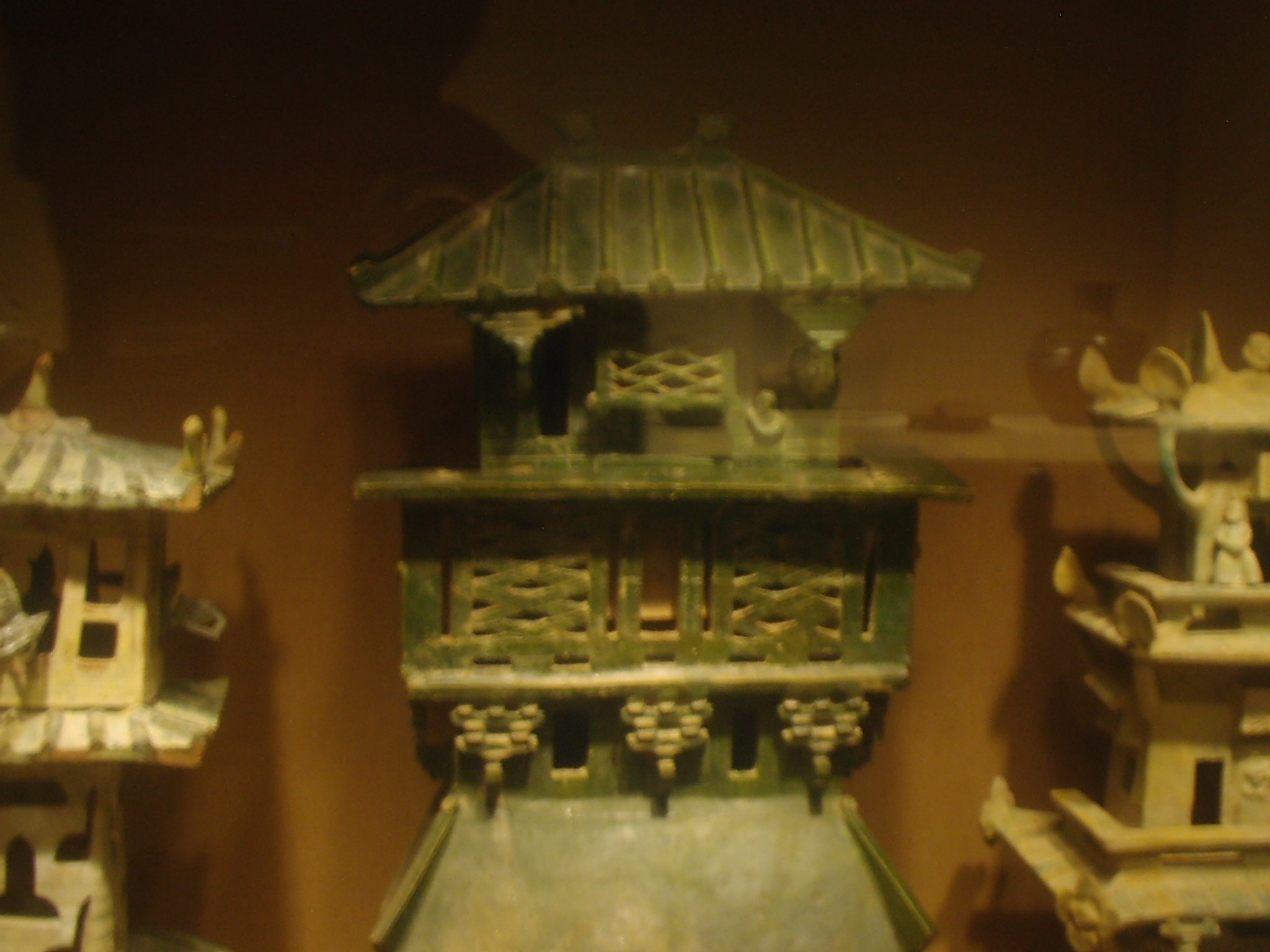
Dougong brackets on an Eastern Han (25–220 CE) era architectural model of a watchtower

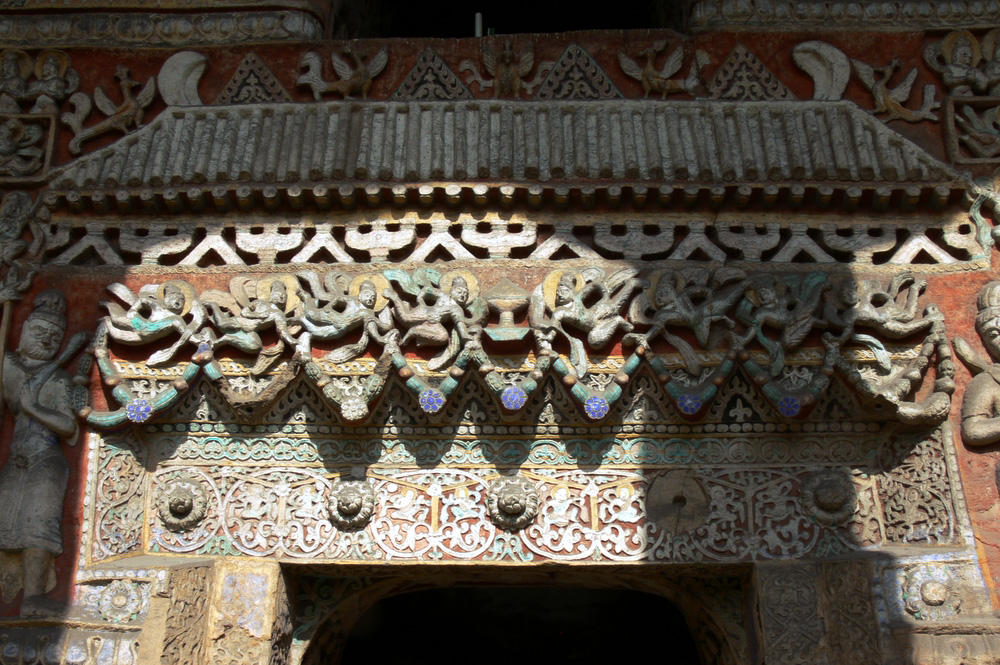
A stone-carved relief above a cave entrance of the Yungang Grottoes (Shanxi province) showing an imitation of dougong brackets, Northern Wei dynasty (386–535 CE)

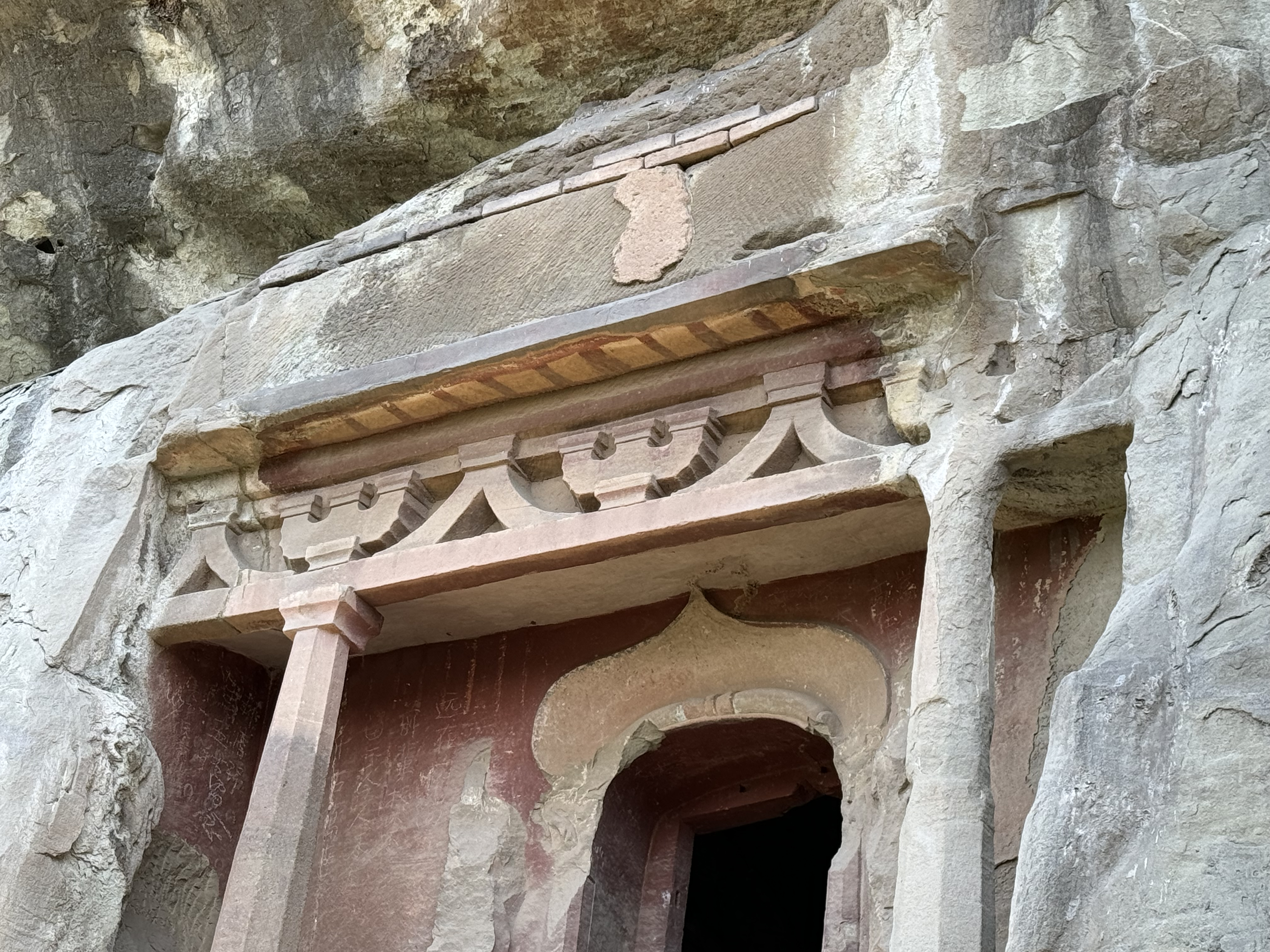
Stone pillars made in imitation of wooden dougong and "人-shaped gong" (Chinese: 人字栱) at cave entrance of Tianlongshan Grottoes, Northern Qi.

Dougong (Chinese: 斗拱; pinyin: dǒugǒng; lit. 'cap [and] block') is a structural element of interlocking wooden brackets, important in traditional Chinese architecture for both its structural capacities and cultural implications.

The use of dougong first appeared in buildings of the late centuries BCE, with its earliest renditions emerging during the Western Zhou Dynasty, evolving over the centuries into a structural network which joined pillars and columns to the frame of the roof. Dougong were widely used by the ancient Chinese during the Spring and Autumn period (770–476 BCE) and developed into a complex set of interlocking parts by its peak in the Tang and Song periods. The pieces are fitted together by joinery alone without glue or fasteners, requiring precise carpentry.

After the Song dynasty, brackets and bracket sets used in palatial structures and important religious buildings became more ornamental than structural, moving away from the description of traditional dougong.

== Function ==
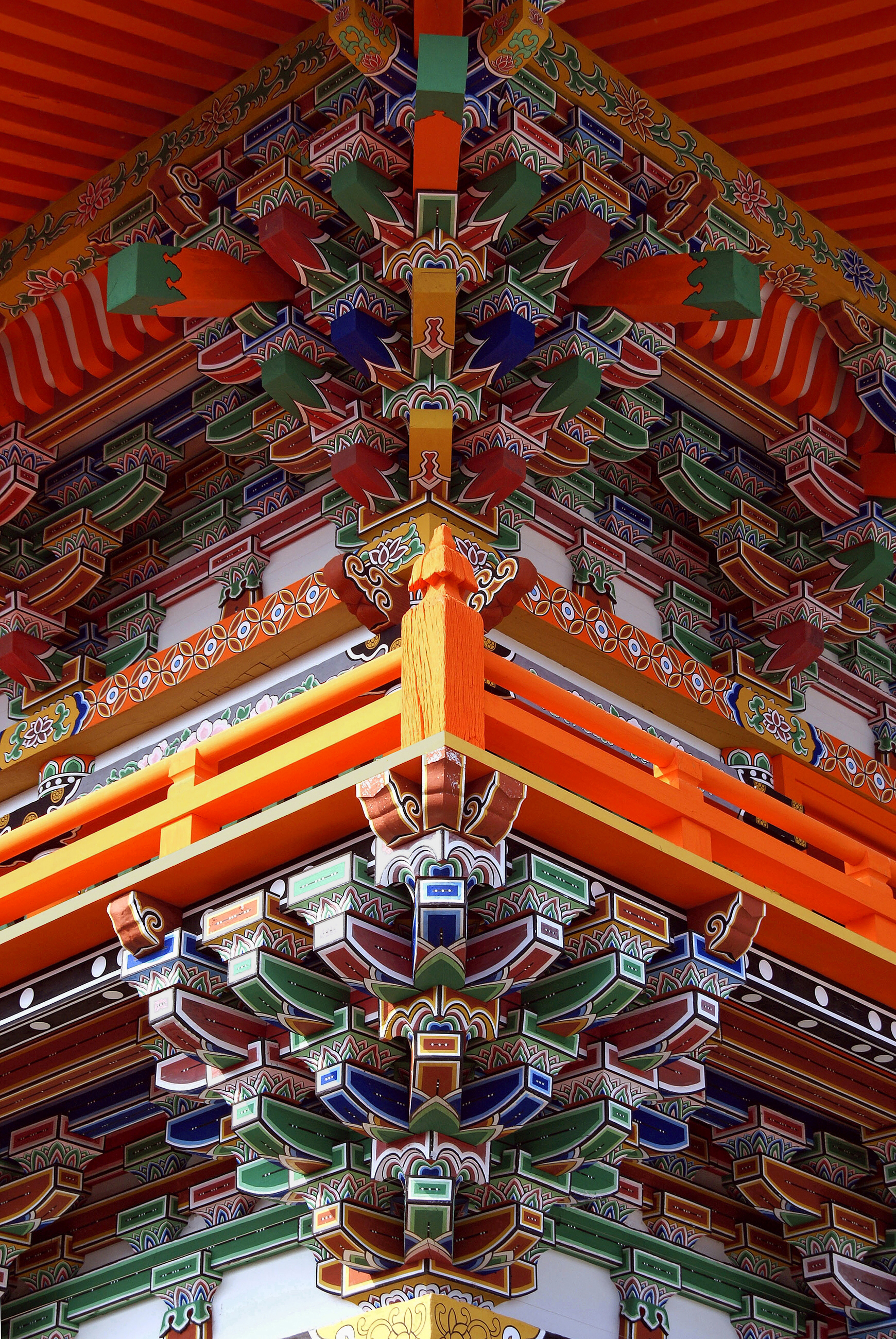
Colourful dougong supporting a structure at Sagami-ji, Japan

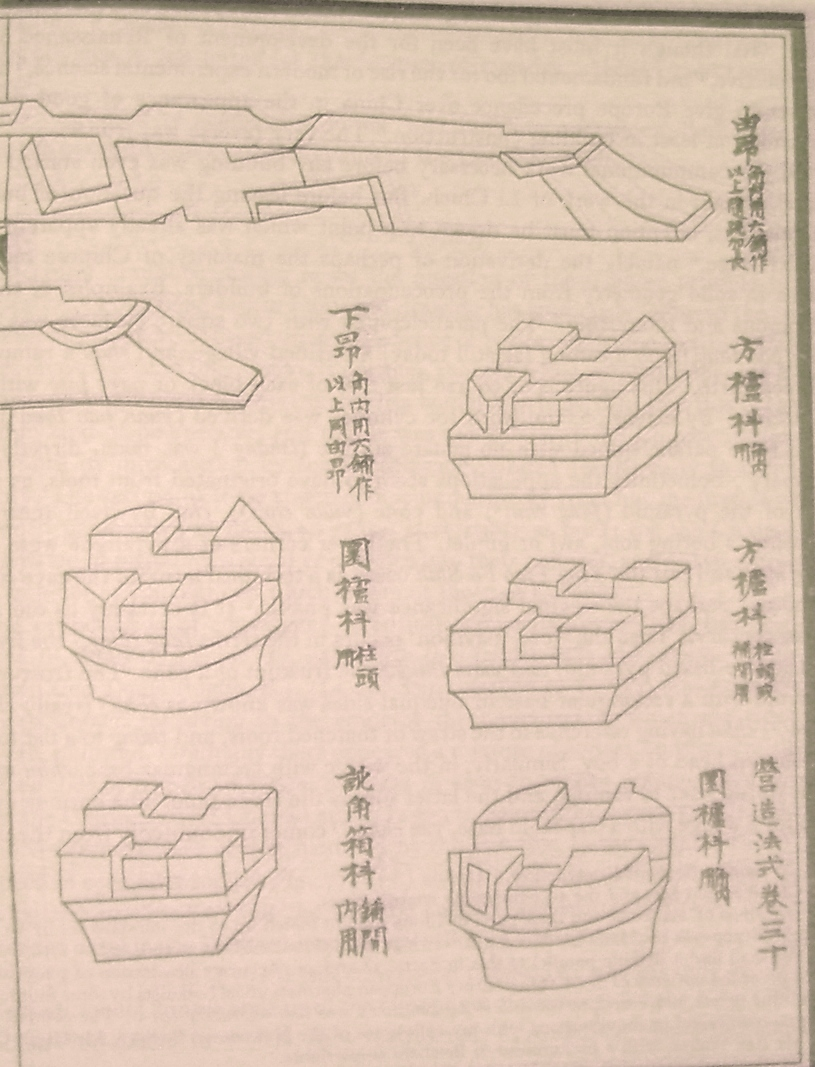
Diagram of bracket and cantilever arms from the building manual Yingzao Fashi (published in 1103) of the Song dynasty

Dougong is part of the network of wooden supports essential to the timber-frame structure of traditional Chinese building. Dougong serve as a connection between the vertical columns and horizontal beams of a structure, capturing the weight of a larger surface area of each beam and transferring it vertically through the column. It is characterized by layers of interlocking bracket sets, formed by placing a large wooden block (dou) on a column to provide a base for the bow-shaped brackets (gong) which in turn support either the horizontal structural beam or another bracket above. The wooden joinery is one of the earliest examples of modern mortise and tenon joints, using precisely cut notches and grooves to allow for a tight fit.

This process can be repeated many times, and rise many stories, each layer of dougong joinery providing a broader, and more stable surface area for the beam. Adding multiple sets of interlocking brackets reduces the amount of strain on the horizontal beams, creates elasticity, and allows structures to withstand damage from earthquakes.

During the early Tang and Song dynasties (618–1297), dougong was used primarily as a weight-bearing structural element. Walls, in much of traditional Chinese Architecture of the time, functioned to delineate spaces within the structure rather than to support its weight. Since often the walls in these structures were not load-bearing (curtain walls), made of latticework, mud, or other delicate material, the integrity of external load bearing features, such as the dougong, were critical to the structure's integrity.

== Development and cultural implications ==
As dougong developed throughout Chinese dynasties, so too did its ornamentation and cultural importance.

From its initial emergence, joinery systems resembling dougong displayed neither ornamentation nor fixed norms or systems in their construction. Over the next several centuries, and with the increasing importance of Buddhism, more emphasis was placed on decorative elements in wooden joinery, and these initial systems began to take on a more consistent form. It wasn't until the late Song Dynasty, a time of economic prosperity in much of China, that dougong began to take on its rich decorative characteristics. During the Ming dynasty, (1368–1644) innovation brought about the invention of new wooden components that aided dougong in supporting the roof. This allowed dougong to add a decorative element to buildings, exemplifying the traditional Chinese integration of artistry and function. Bracket sets became smaller and more numerous, and brackets could be hung under eaves, giving the appearance of graceful baskets of flowers while continuing to support the roof. The Bao'en Temple in Sichuan is a good example of the Ming style. It has forty-eight types and 2,200 sets of dougong to support and ornament it. It is a well-preserved fifteenth century monastery complex located in northwestern Sichuan province, China. It was built by Wang Xi, a local chieftain, between 1440 and 1446 during Emperor Yingzong's reign (1427–64).

Throughout this development, dougong came to represent cultural hierarchy and identity. For a time, the use of dougong was banned from public use, and as a result became a representation of the upper & ruling classes. Some of the most studied dougong are found in the Forbidden City, representing the height of imperial power.

== Earthquake resistance ==
Modern research has increasingly shown dougong's importance in resisting the destructive capabilities of earthquakes.

Each element of the dougong system is fastened without the use of static fasteners such as bolts, pins, screws, or nails. Each bracket in the dougong system is held together by the friction fit of each joint and the compressive weight of the vertical load. Each column, in addition, is supported without the use of fasteners often by cornerstones or other stone mounting features.

The capacity for seismic resistance in dougong joints and systems comes primarily from their ability to dissipate energy between column and beam through friction, compression deflection, rotary deformation, and extrusion. In essence, the dynamic nature of dougong's construction dissipates seismic energy as it travels through the joints, offering a layer of protection for structures that employ it.

== See also ==
- Tokyō

== Additional sources ==
- Liang Ssu Ch'eng Chinese Architecture, A Pictorial History ISBN 0-486-43999-2
