= Scutiger mammatus =

Conservation status
- Least Concern (IUCN 3.1)

Scientific classification
- Kingdom: Animalia
- Phylum: Chordata
- Class: Amphibia
- Order: Anura
- Family: Megophryidae
- Genus: Scutiger
- Species: S. mammatus

Binomial name
- Scutiger mammatus (Günther, 1896)

Synonyms
- Bufo mammatus Günther, 1896; Aelurophryne mammata (Günther, 1896); Aelurophryne gigas Zarevskij, 1926 "1925"; Scutiger ruginosus Zhao and Jiang, 1982

Species of frog

Scutiger mammatus (common names: Tungsolo lazy toad, chest spiny cat-eyed toad, spiny-chest cat-eyed toad) is a species of frog in the family Megophryidae. It is endemic to Western China and known from eastern Tibet, southeastern Qinghai, western Sichuan, and northwestern Yunnan.

== Description ==
Adult males measure 62–81 mm (2.4–3.2 in) and adult females 61–78 mm (2.4–3.1 in) in snout–vent length, although Jiang and colleagues report a much lower range for males, 60–72 mm (2.4–2.8 in). The head is broad and depressed. The tympanum is small and hidden under skin. The toes are partially webbed. Males have nuptial spines on the first and second fingers, as well as two well-developed chest glands covered by strong spines. No vocal sac is present.

The tadpoles are adapted to running water and have elongated, dorso-ventrally flattened bodies and long tails. They grow to a total length of 80 mm (3.1 in), of which the body makes about one third.

== Habitat and conservation ==
Scutiger mammatus lives in small to medium-sized low-gradient streams, seepages, and spring-fed marshes in sub-alpine and alpine areas at elevations of 2,600–4,200 m (8,500–13,800 ft) above sea level. It is a very common species. Threats to it are unknown, but overgrazing is a potential threat. There are many protected areas within its range.
