= Scutiger nepalensis =

Conservation status
- Near Threatened (IUCN 3.1)

Scientific classification
- Kingdom: Animalia
- Phylum: Chordata
- Class: Amphibia
- Order: Anura
- Family: Megophryidae
- Genus: Scutiger
- Species: S. nepalensis

Binomial name
- Scutiger nepalensis Dubois, 1974

Species of amphibian

Scutiger nepalensis, otherwise known as the Nepal lazy toad, is a species of amphibian in the family Megophryidae. It is found in Nepal, possibly China, and possibly India. Its natural habitats are subtropical or tropical high-altitude grassland and rivers. It is threatened by habitat loss.
