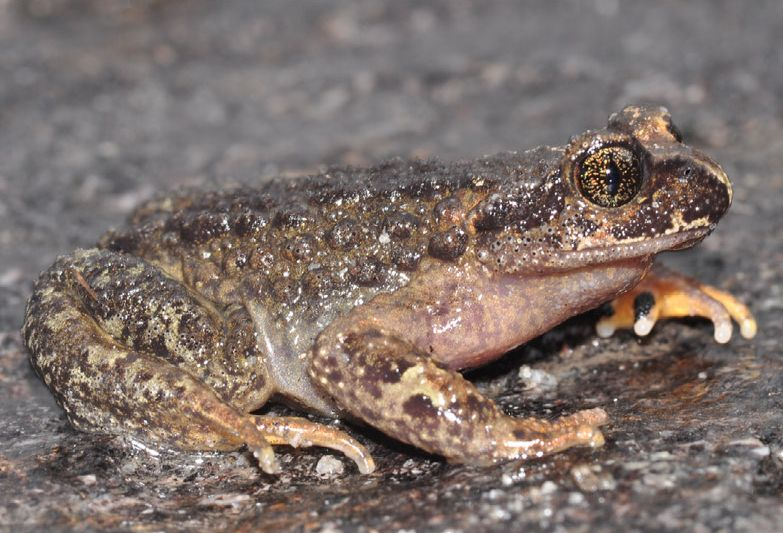
- Scutiger sikimmensis from Sikkim, India

Conservation status
- Least Concern (IUCN 3.1)

Scientific classification
- Kingdom: Animalia
- Phylum: Chordata
- Class: Amphibia
- Order: Anura
- Family: Megophryidae
- Genus: Scutiger
- Species: S. sikimmensis

Binomial name
- Scutiger sikimmensis (Blyth, 1855)

Synonyms
- Bombinator sikimmensis Blyth, 1855 "1854"; Scutiger sikkimmensis —misspelling

= Scutiger sikimmensis =

Species of amphibian

Scutiger sikimmensis is a species of toad in the family Megophryidae. It is found in northeastern India (West Bengal, Sikkim, and Meghalaya), Nepal, Bhutan, and Tibet. Many common names have been coined for this species: Sikkim lazy toad, Sikimmese pelobatid toad, Sikkim high altitude toad, Sikkim spade foot frog, Blyth's short-limbed frog, and Sikkim snow toad. It is very common in the high altitudes of Sikkimese Himalaya.

== Description ==
Males measure 42–62 mm (1.7–2.4 in) and females 45–67 mm (1.8–2.6 in) in snout–vent length. The dorsum is olive green, brown, or greyish-brown with numerous warts and variable patterning. The underparts are yellowish, uniform and smooth. The head is wider than long; the tympanum is hidden. The parotoid gland are present. The fingers have no webbing whereas the toes have rudimentary webbing. Tadpoles are up to 53 mm (2.1 in) in length.

== Habitat and conservation ==
Scutiger sikimmensis is an alpine toad living near streams, oxbow lakes, seepages, and stream-fed marshes as well as the surrounding forest and grassland habitats. Breeding takes place in streams in May–June or June–August; males call from under the rocks at night. The altitudinal range differs between sources; the lower limit is about 2,500 m (8,200 ft) and the upper limit 4,600–5,000 m (15,100–16,400 ft) above sea level.

The species is common in the Indian part of its range but rare in Tibet. Major threats are diversion of water from breeding streams for irrigation and water pollution from agrochemicals. However, it is not considered threatened overall.
