= Scutiger glandulatus =

Conservation status
- Least Concern (IUCN 3.1)

Scientific classification
- Kingdom: Animalia
- Phylum: Chordata
- Class: Amphibia
- Order: Anura
- Family: Megophryidae
- Genus: Scutiger
- Species: S. glandulatus

Binomial name
- Scutiger glandulatus (Liu, 1950)

Species of frog

Scutiger glandulatus is a species of frog in the family Megophryidae. It is endemic to China. It is recorded in western Sichuan and northwestern Yunnan, including in Gonggashan National Nature Reserve and Daochengyading National Nature Reserve.

Its natural habitats are subtropical or tropical moist montane forests, temperate grassland, subtropical or tropical high-altitude grassland, and rivers.
