= Bao'en Temple (Pingwu) =

Building in Bao'en Temple, Pingwu County, China

Coordinates: 32°24′40″N 104°31′48″E

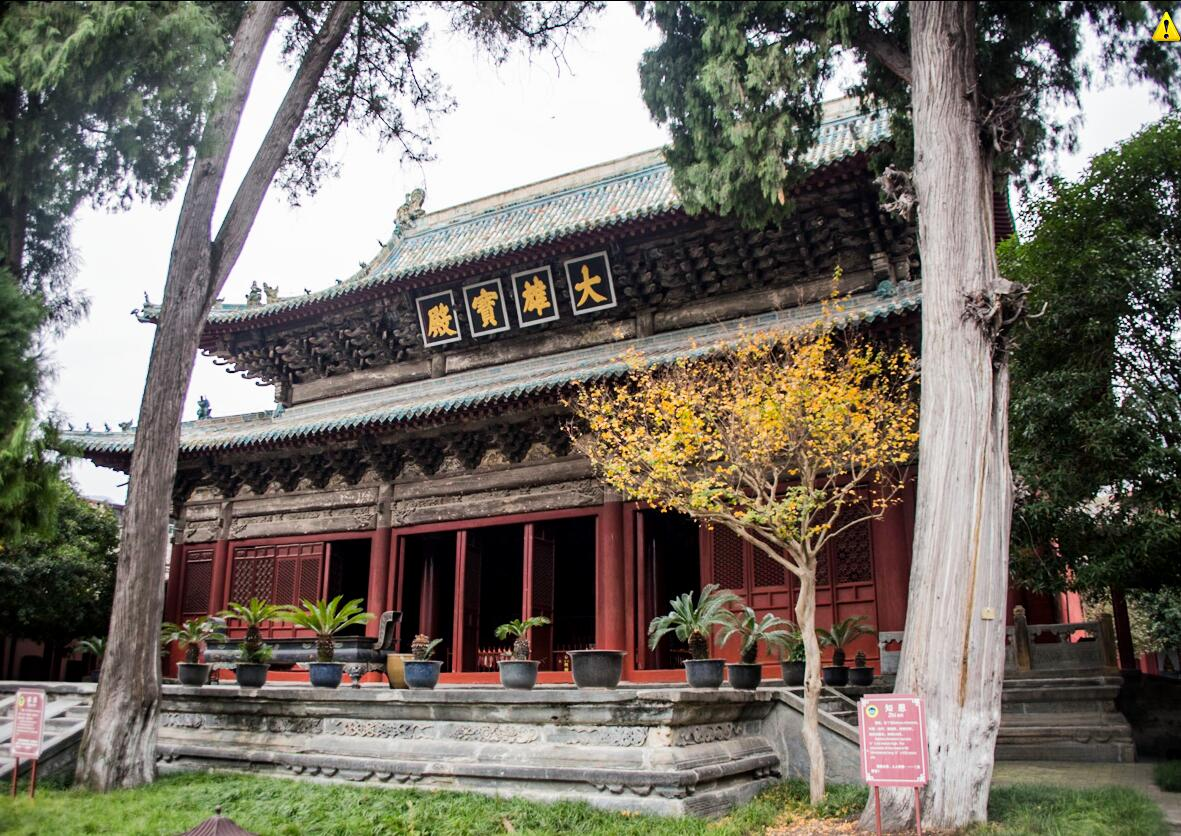
Daxiong Hall of Bao'en Temple.

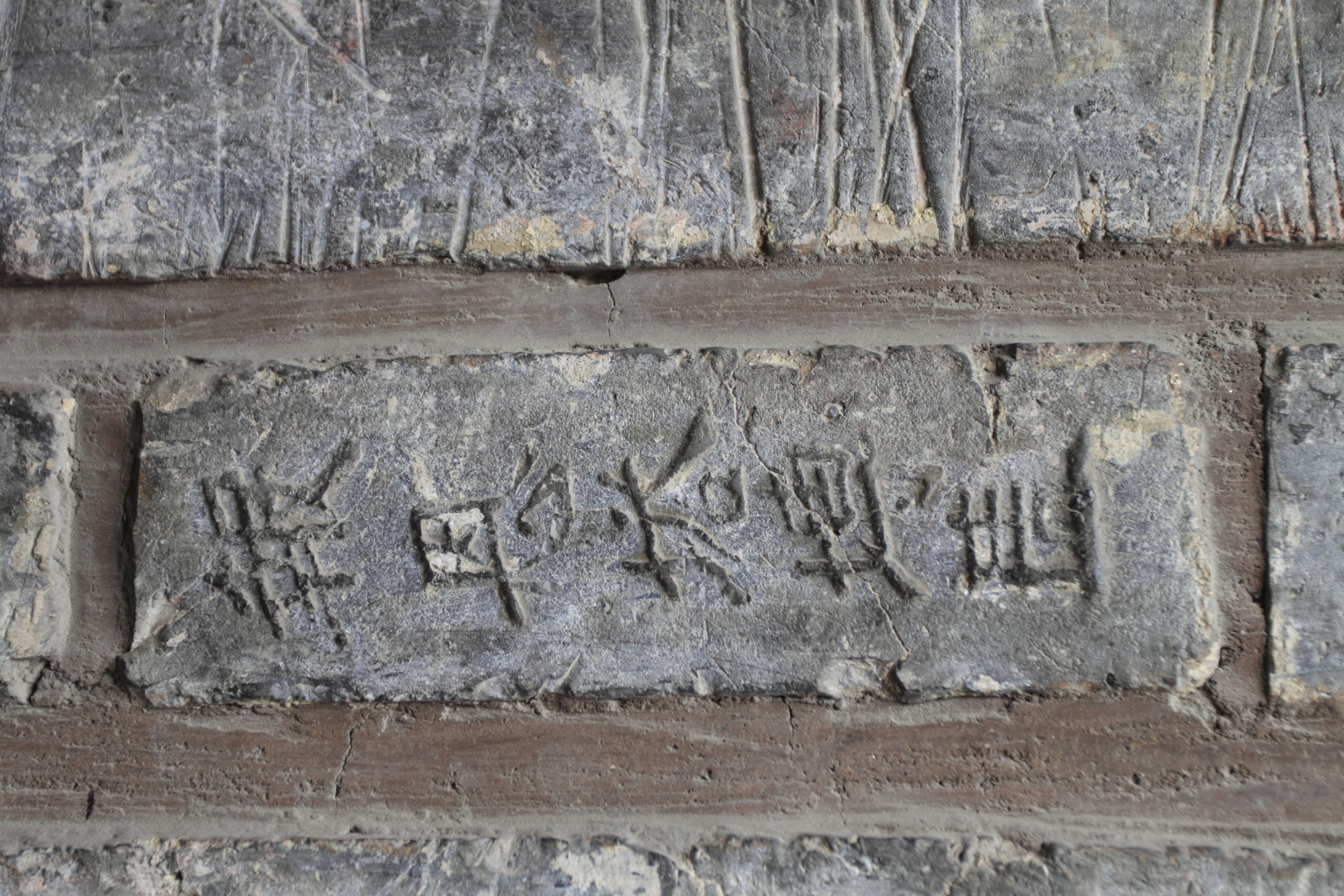
Bricks of Bao'en Temple Pagoda

Bao'en Temple (traditional Chinese: 報恩寺; simplified Chinese: 报恩寺; pinyin: Bào'ēnsì), also known as Bao'en Monastery, is a well-preserved fifteenth-century Buddhist monastery complex located in Pingwu County, in northwestern Sichuan Province, China. It was built by Wang Xi, a local chieftain, between 1440 and 1446 during Emperor Yingzong's reign (1427–64) in the Ming dynasty (1368–1644).

== History ==
The monastery complex, which includes a main hall, pavilions, Dabei Hall (enshrining a thousand-armed image of Avalokitesvara) and Huayan Hall (containing a precious revolving sutra cabinet, zhuanlun cang) was completed by 1443. The wall paintings, sculptures and other ornamental details were finished by 1460. These ornamental additions, such as the Ming period sculpture, painting and murals, the wooden Avalokitesvara and the sutra repository are masterpieces of the period. The complex is very well preserved and a major achievement in Ming religious architecture.

== Description ==
As is typical in Chinese Buddhist temples, the major halls were constructed along a central axis while the minor halls and other structures were built along transverse axes. The many galleries connecting the halls form rectangular courtyards. Numerous other buildings are part of the complex including a meditation hall, a fasting hall, and storage halls. Stele pavilions stand on the east and west sides. As is characteristic of the Ming style, in every hall part of the ceiling is exposed. Dabei hall has double eaves. Under the eaves have been placed dougong, an assemblage of a number of blocks and arms (sets of brackets) that support the hall's roof. Forty-eight different types and 2,200 sets of dougong support and ornament the structures within the Bao'en Temple complex. The main hall is the most important building; its roof is covered with black and green glazed tiles.

At the centre of Dabei Hall is a golden statue of Guanyin, the goddess of mercy, carved out of a nanmu tree. The figure is nine metres tall and has 1,004 clusters of hands and eyes. At the centre of Huayan Hall is the revolving sutra cabinet, a huge octagonal wooden structure that turns like a lever and even today can still turn smoothly.

== See also ==
- List of Buddhist temples
