= Scutiger chintingensis =

Conservation status
- Vulnerable (IUCN 3.1)

Scientific classification
- Kingdom: Animalia
- Phylum: Chordata
- Class: Amphibia
- Order: Anura
- Family: Megophryidae
- Genus: Scutiger
- Species: S. chintingensis

Binomial name
- Scutiger chintingensis Liu & Hu, 1960

Species of amphibian

Scutiger chintingensis, also known as the Chinting lazy toad or Chinting alpine toad, is an endangered species of amphibian in the family Megophryidae. It is endemic to the Mount Emei region of Sichuan, China.

== Habitat ==
The Chinting alpine toad breeds in mountain streams at altitudes of 2,700-3,400 m.

== Conservation ==
The species is classified as Vulnerable by the IUCN because of ongoing habitat loss and rapidly declining population sizes. It is known to be present in the protected areas of the Emeishan Natural and Historical Heritage Reserve, the Wawushan National Forest Park, and the Wolong Nature Reserve.
