= Ningshan County =

Coordinates: 33°26′28″N 108°22′16″E

Ningshan County 宁陕县 Ningshen
- County
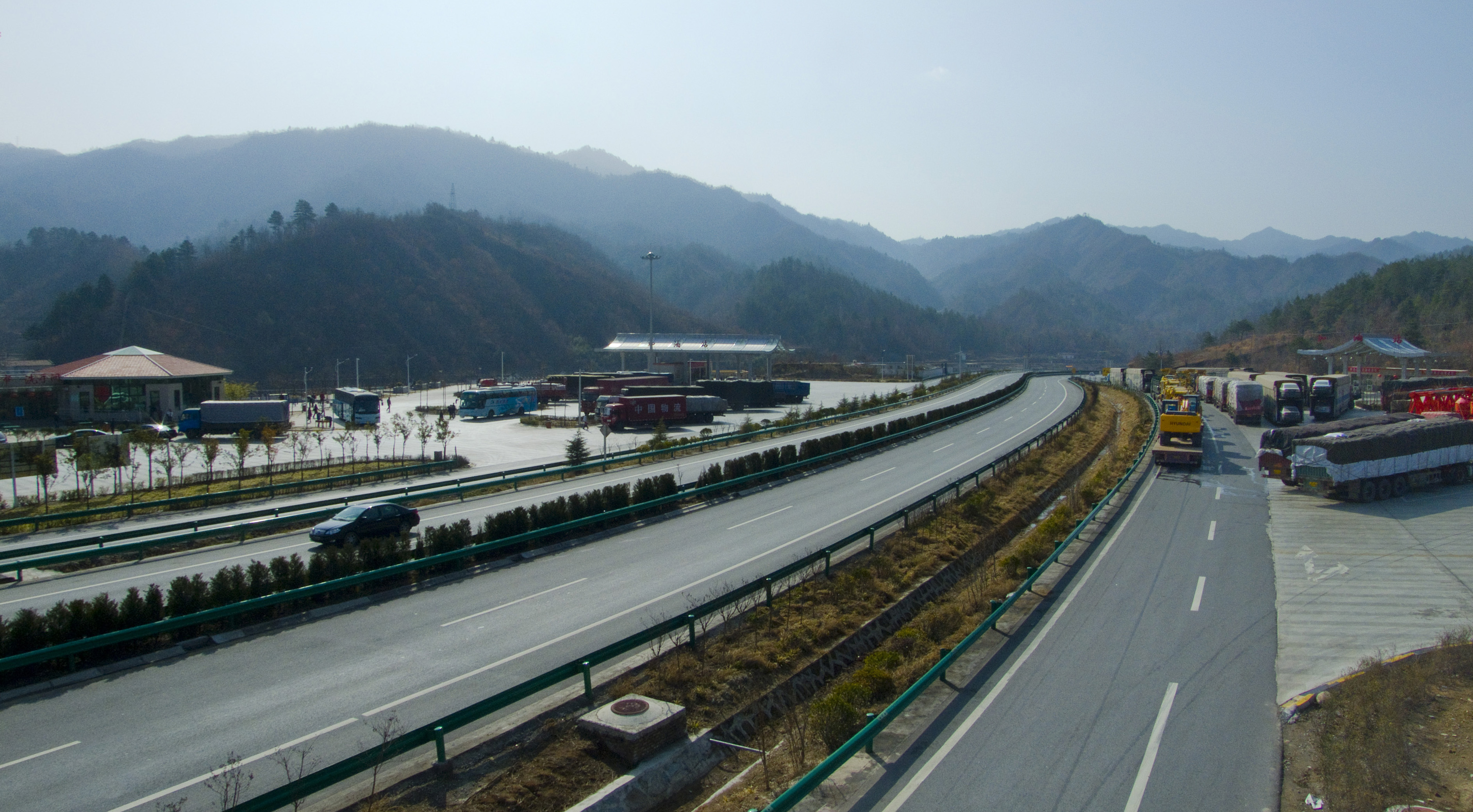
- View of Ningshan from a rest area along the Jingkun Expressway

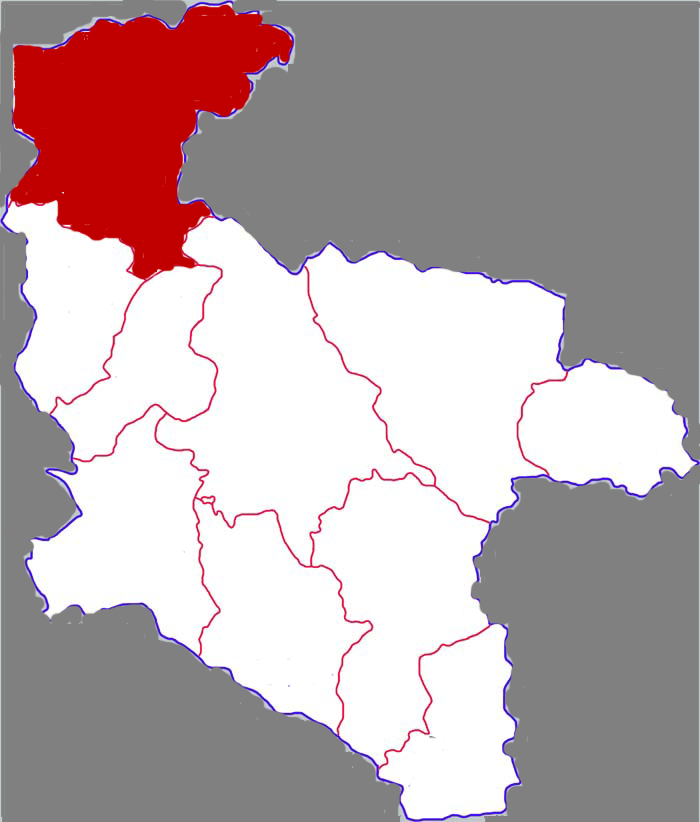
- Ningshan in Ankang

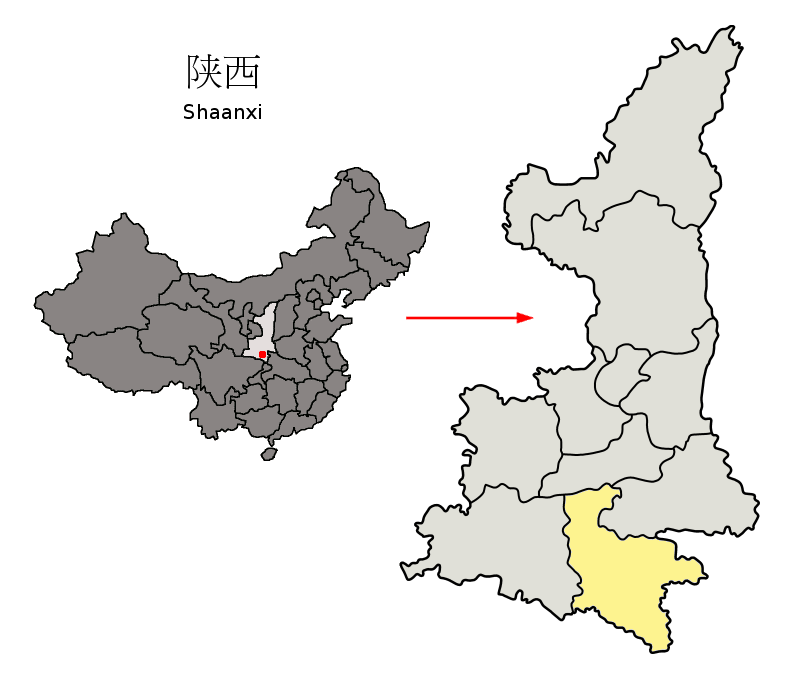
- Ankang in Shaanxi
- Country: People's Republic of China
- Province: Shaanxi
- Prefecture-level city: Ankang

Area
  - Total: 3,678 km^{2} (1,420 sq mi)

Population (2018)
  - Total: 70,318
  - Density: 19.12/km^{2} (49.52/sq mi)
- Time zone: UTC+8 (China standard time)
- Postal code: 711699
- Licence plates: 陕G

Ningshan County (simplified Chinese: 宁陕县; traditional Chinese: 寧陝縣; pinyin: Níngshǎn Xiàn) is a county in the south of Shaanxi province, China. It is the northernmost county-level division of Ankang City.

== Administrative divisions ==
As of 2019, Ningshan County is divided to 11 towns.

Towns (镇; zhèn)

- Chengguan (城关镇)
- Simude (四亩地镇)
- Jiangkou (江口镇)
- Guanghuojie (广货街镇)
- Longwang (龙王镇)
- Tongchewan (筒车湾镇)
- Jinchuan (金川镇)
- Huangguan (皇冠镇)
- Taishanmiao (太山庙镇)
- Meizi (梅子镇)
- Xinchang (新场镇)

== Climate ==
Climate data for Ningshan, elevation 802 m (2,631 ft), (1991–2020 normals, extremes 1981–present)
Month	Jan	Feb	Mar	Apr	May	Jun	Jul	Aug	Sep	Oct	Nov	Dec	Year
Record high °C (°F)	17.1 (62.8)	22.3 (72.1)	31.3 (88.3)	33.0 (91.4)	34.0 (93.2)	36.3 (97.3)	37.4 (99.3)	35.7 (96.3)	36.0 (96.8)	28.2 (82.8)	24.3 (75.7)	17.7 (63.9)	37.4 (99.3)
Mean daily maximum °C (°F)	7.1 (44.8)	10.0 (50.0)	15.2 (59.4)	21.1 (70.0)	24.4 (75.9)	27.7 (81.9)	29.8 (85.6)	29.1 (84.4)	23.8 (74.8)	18.6 (65.5)	13.4 (56.1)	8.5 (47.3)	19.1 (66.3)
Daily mean °C (°F)	1.0 (33.8)	3.8 (38.8)	8.3 (46.9)	13.7 (56.7)	17.3 (63.1)	21.1 (70.0)	23.6 (74.5)	22.7 (72.9)	18.1 (64.6)	12.8 (55.0)	7.2 (45.0)	2.2 (36.0)	12.7 (54.8)
Mean daily minimum °C (°F)	−3.0 (26.6)	−0.4 (31.3)	3.4 (38.1)	8.1 (46.6)	12.0 (53.6)	16.0 (60.8)	19.0 (66.2)	18.4 (65.1)	14.5 (58.1)	9.3 (48.7)	3.3 (37.9)	−1.7 (28.9)	8.2 (46.8)
Record low °C (°F)	−11.1 (12.0)	−8.6 (16.5)	−8.5 (16.7)	−0.9 (30.4)	2.4 (36.3)	7.8 (46.0)	11.9 (53.4)	10.0 (50.0)	4.9 (40.8)	−4.2 (24.4)	−6.6 (20.1)	−16.4 (2.5)	−16.4 (2.5)
Average precipitation mm (inches)	5.9 (0.23)	11.3 (0.44)	25.4 (1.00)	53.8 (2.12)	90.9 (3.58)	117.4 (4.62)	187.4 (7.38)	160.4 (6.31)	140.7 (5.54)	80.8 (3.18)	34.7 (1.37)	6.9 (0.27)	915.6 (36.04)
Average precipitation days (≥ 0.1 mm)	6.0	6.3	8.9	10.5	12.7	12.4	15.0	13.1	13.2	13.3	9.4	5.7	126.5
Average snowy days	6.5	3.8	1.4	0.1	0	0	0	0	0	0	0.8	2.9	15.5
Average relative humidity (%)	75	72	70	73	78	80	84	85	87	87	83	77	79
Mean monthly sunshine hours	89.7	86.4	120.1	150.4	159.7	167.3	185.7	178.4	114.8	102.1	91.9	96.1	1,542.6
Percentage possible sunshine	28	28	32	38	37	39	43	44	31	29	30	31	34
Source: China Meteorological Administration

== Transport ==
- China National Highway 210
- China National Highway 345
- G5 Beijing–Kunming Expressway
- S21 Ningshan-Shiquan Expressway

== See also ==
- Scutiger ningshanensis, also known as Ningshan lazy toad, endemic to Ningshan
