= Sichuan Agricultural University =

Public university headquartered in Ya'an, Sichuan, China

- 四川农业大学
- Motto: 追求真理、造福社会、自强不息
- Type: Public university Project 211; Double First-Class Construction
- Established: 1906
- President: De Wu （吴德）
- Faculty: 3,600
- Location: Ya'an and Chengdu, Sichuan, China; 30°42′35″N 103°51′35″E
- Colors: Green White
- Website: sicau.edu.cn

Sichuan Agricultural University
- Simplified Chinese: 四川农业大学
- Traditional Chinese: 四川農業大學
Transcriptions
Standard Mandarin
- Hanyu Pinyin: Sìchuān Nóngyè Dàxué

Sichuan Agricultural University (SCAU) is a provincial public agricultural university headquartered in Ya'an, Sichuan, China. It is affiliated with the Province of Sichuan, and co-sponsored by the Ministry of Education and the provincial government. The university is part of Project 211 and the Double First-Class Construction.

The university emphasizes on agricultural and forestry studies. With the registered office and main campus in Ya'an, Sichuan Province, the university maintains three campuses in Ya'an and Chengdu.

== History ==
At the end of the Qing Dynasty, under the national trend of promoting education and strengthening the country, Xu Handu, the governor of Sichuan, petitioned the Qing court to establish a secondary agricultural school in Sichuan. In 1906 (the 32nd year of Guangxu reign), Sichuan Provincial Agricultural School (四川通省农业学堂) was established in an old warehouse on the right side of Baochuan Bureau inside Houzaimen in Chengdu. This was the first agricultural school established in Sichuan and the historical origin of Sichuan Agricultural University. The school started classes on June 1, 1906 and held an official opening ceremony on September 12. Sichuan Governor Xiliang gave a speech at the ceremony: "Sichuan has thousands of miles of fertile land, and was known as the land of abundance in ancient times. It used to compete with the world with its silk profits, but only stuck to its old methods, and its profits gradually flowed out. Therefore, it is necessary to promote agricultural education as a preparation for revitalizing agriculture." Sichuan Provincial Agricultural School initially set up preparatory and undergraduate courses in agriculture, sericulture and forestry. In April 1910, the school moved to a new campus built at the agricultural experimental field near Wangjianglou outside the east gate of Chengdu.

After the 1911 Revolution, it was renamed Sichuan Higher Agricultural School (四川高等农业学校) with the approval of the Sichuan Military Government, and set up college and secondary departments. In 1914, it was renamed Sichuan Public Agricultural School (四川公立农业专门学校), and added undergraduate courses in agriculture and sericulture. In August 1927, Sichuan Public Agricultural School merged with five other specialized schools, namely Sichuan Public Law and Politics School, Sichuan Public Industrial School, Sichuan Public Foreign Language School and Sichuan Public National Studies School, to form Public Sichuan University (公立四川大学). The public agricultural school became the College of Agriculture of Sichuan Public University. In 1931, the Sichuan Provincial Government decided to change the engineering and agricultural sciences of the original Sichuan Public University into independent colleges. The College of Agricultural Sciences was named Sichuan Provincial Agricultural College (四川省立农学院).

In July 1935, Sichuan Provincial Agricultural College and Chongqing University Agricultural College were incorporated into National Sichuan University (国立四川大学) and formed the College of Agriculture. The college had a great development afterwards. In November 1937, Yang Kaiqu became the dean of the College of Agriculture. In 1943, after investigating China's higher education, British biochemist and historian of science and technology Joseph Needham praised agriculture as "the strongest discipline" of Sichuan University in his report, and highly affirmed the strength of the National Sichuan University College of Agriculture at that time.

In 1952, during 1952 reorganisation of Chinese higher education, while some departments were transferred out, the agronomy, forestry, animal husbandry and veterinary majors from Southwest Agricultural College, Yunnan University Agricultural College, Chuanbei University and Xichang Technical College were transferred into Sichuan University College of Agriculture, which laid a foundation for the development of the college.

In 1956, Sichuan University Agricultural College moved from Chengdu to Ya'an and established itself as an independent school, named Sichuan Agricultural College (四川农学院). On September 5, 1956, Sichuan Agricultural College held its founding ceremony in Ya'an. Deng Xihou, then vice governor of Sichuan Province, Kang Naier, director of the Provincial Higher Education Bureau, Zhao Mengming, deputy director of the Provincial Agriculture Department, and Ya'an Party and government leaders attended the ceremony. There were 1,134 students and 515 faculty and staff in the school, including 205 full-time teachers. In 1959, it began to recruit three-year master's degree students in rice cultivation, veterinary obstetrics and gynecology, corn breeding, livestock feeding and poultry breeding. It was interrupted by the "Cultural Revolution" until 1978.

In 1977, when the college entrance examination was resumed, Sichuan Agricultural College had six departments: agriculture, animal husbandry and veterinary medicine, agricultural chemistry, horticulture, forestry and agricultural machinery; and nine majors: agriculture, agricultural economics, animal husbandry, veterinary medicine, soil chemistry, horticulture, tea science, forestry and agricultural machinery. In June 1985, with the approval of the Sichuan Provincial People's Government, the school was renamed Sichuan Agricultural University (四川农业大学). In the same year, it began to recruit doctoral students. On June 14, 1999, with the approval of the State Development Planning Commission, the school was approved as a "211 Project" institution and was constructed during the "Ninth Five-Year Plan" period. Since then, the school has officially entered the ranks of the first batch of "211 Project" key construction universities. In July 2010, the Chengdu Scientific Research Institute of SAU was abolished and changed to Chengdu Campus of SAU. In October 2010, the Chengdu campus was officially put into use. In September 2017, Sichuan Agricultural University was selected as one of the first batch of national "Double First-Class Construction" universities.

== Basic Profile ==
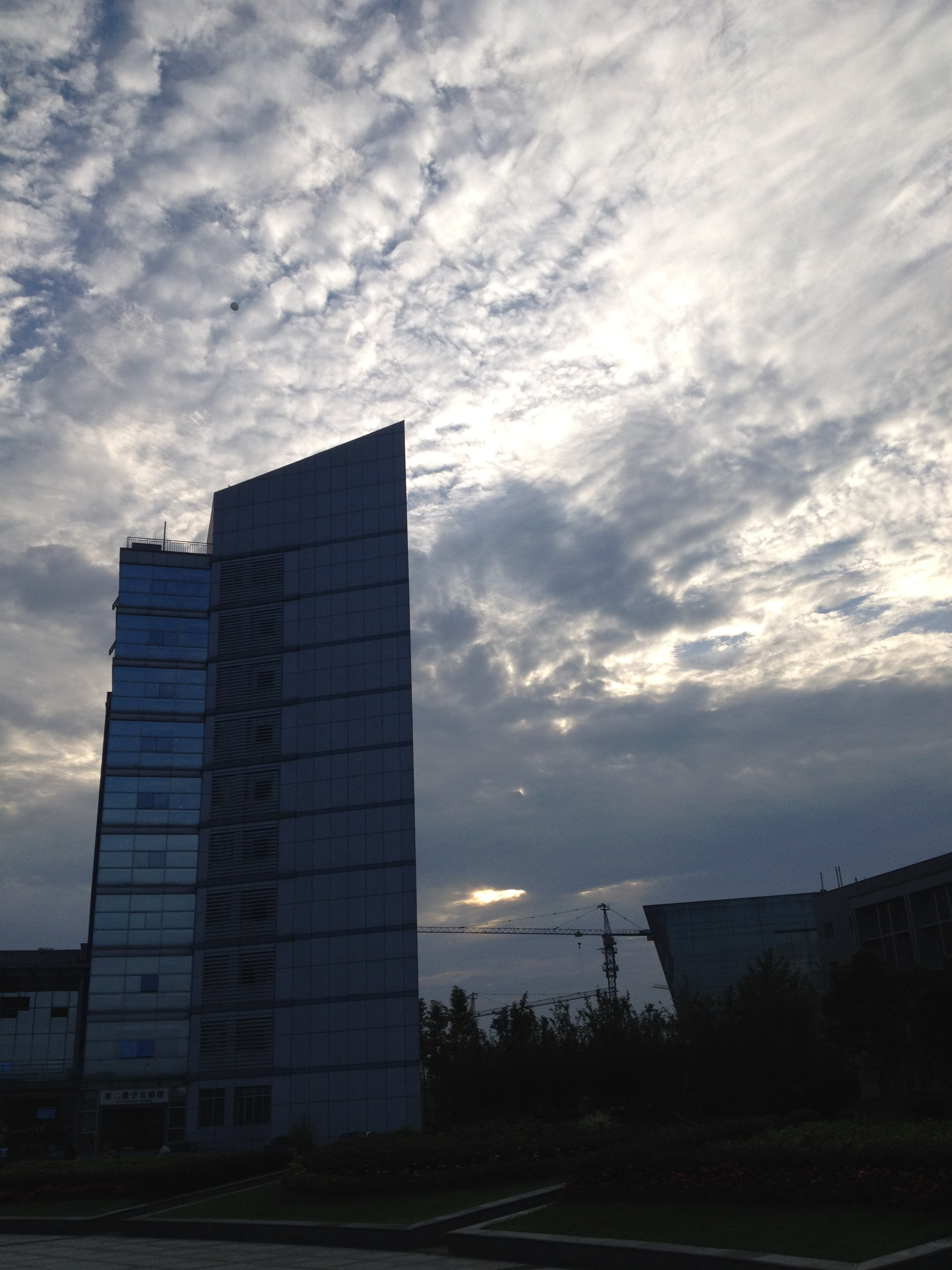
The building is one of the main research building of SAU in Chengdu Campus.

=== Campuses ===
SAU has three campuses, namely Chengdu campus located in Wenjiang District of Chengdu City, Ya'an campus located in Yucheng District of Ya'an City, and Dujiangyan campus located in Dujiangyan City of Chengdu City, covering a total area of about 300 hectares (740 acres).

The Chengdu campus houses several of the university's colleges and research institutes..

Ya'an campus coexists with Ya'an city, covering an area of more than 200 hectares (490 acres), which is almost equivalent to one third of Ya'an city. The Ya'an campus is divided by the Fenjiang River into the old campus and the new campus.

The Dujiangyan Campus includes general and specialist undergraduate programs.

=== Scientific Research Strength ===
The university has 26 colleges, 4 research institutes (centers), and 2 state key laboratories, covering 10 major disciplines such as agriculture, science, engineering, economics, management, medicine, literature, education, law, and art. There are 8 post-doctoral research stations, 11 first-level disciplines and 49 second-level disciplines authorized to grant doctoral degrees, 1 category of doctoral professional degree authorization, 20 first-level disciplines and 100 second-level disciplines authorized to grant master's degrees, 16 categories of master's professional degree authorization, and 76 undergraduate enrollment majors; 4 national key disciplines and key cultivation disciplines, and 20 key disciplines of ministries and provinces. According to the comprehensive score of the fourth round of national discipline evaluation in 2017, the university ranked 7th among national agricultural and forestry universities and 4th among Sichuan universities. 9 disciplines of agricultural science, plant and animal science, biology and biochemistry, environmental science and ecology, chemistry, microbiology, engineering, molecular biology and genetics, and sociology ranked among the top 1% in the world in ESI.

=== Colleges ===
- Chengdu Campus
  - College of Agronomy
  - College of Animal Science and Technology
  - College of Veterinary Medicine
  - College of Forestry
  - College of Horticulture
  - College of Resources
  - College of Grassland Science and Technology
  - College of Environmental Sciences
  - College of Landscape Architecture
  - College of Economics
  - College of Management
  - College of Marxism
  - International College
  - Rice Research Institute
  - Triticeae Research Institute
  - Maize Research Institute
  - Animal Nutrition Institute
  - State Key Laboratories
- Ya'an Campus
  - College of Science
  - College of Life Science
  - College of Mechanical and Electrical Engineering
  - College of Food Science
  - College of Information Engineering
  - College of Water Conservancy and Hydropower Engineering
  - College of Literature and Law
  - College of Arts and Sports
  - College of Distance and Continuing Education
- Dujiangyan Campus
  - College of Architecture and Urban-Rural Planning
  - College of Civil Engineering
  - College of Tourism
  - Business School
