= Pingwu County =

Pingwu County 平武县 • ཕེན་བོས་རྫོང
- County
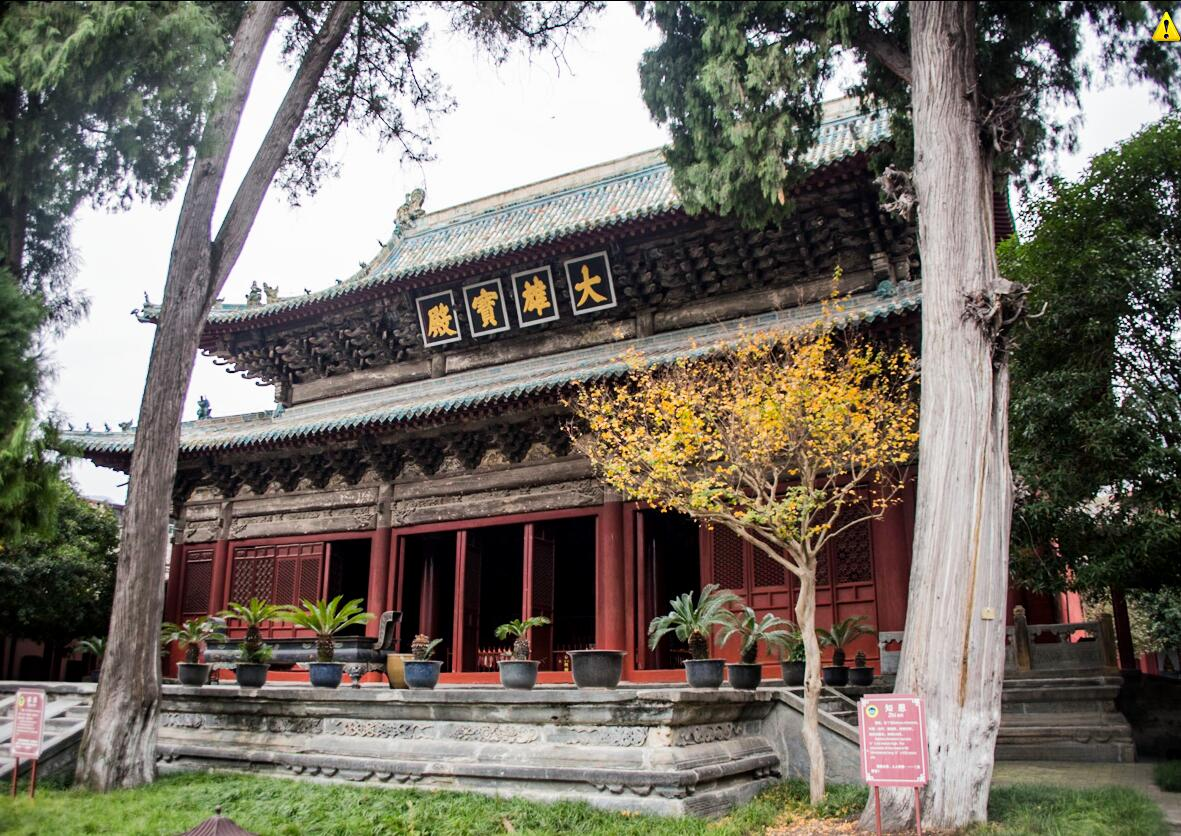
- Bao'en Temple in Pingwu County

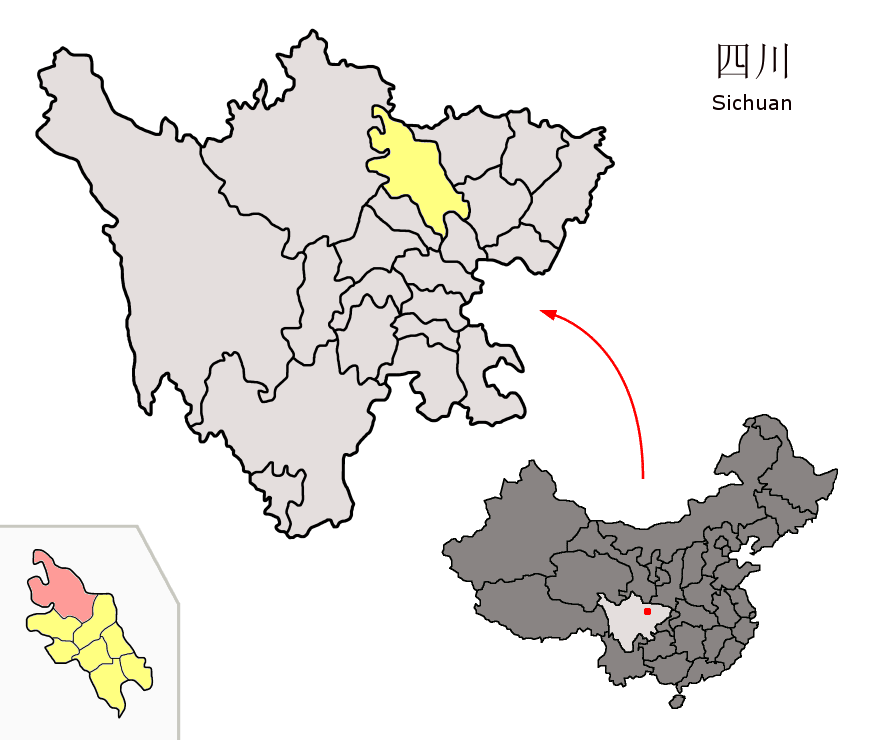
- Location of Pingwu County (red) and Mianyang City (yellow) in Sichuan
- Coordinates: 32°24′36″N 104°33′22″E
- Country: China
- Province: Sichuan
- Prefecture-level city: Mianyang
- County seat: Long'an

Area
  - Total: 5,974 km^{2} (2,307 sq mi)
- Highest elevation (Mount Xuebaoding): 5,588 m (18,333 ft)
- Lowest elevation: 600 m (2,000 ft)

Population (2020)
  - Total: 126,357
  - Density: 21.15/km^{2} (54.78/sq mi)
- Time zone: UTC+8 (China Standard)
- Postal code: 622550
- Area code: 0816
- Website: www.pingwu.gov.cn

Pingwu County (Chinese: 平武县; pinyin: Píngwǔ Xiàn) is a county located in the north of Sichuan province, China, bordering Gansu province to the north. It is the northernmost county-level division of the prefecture-level city of Mianyang.

It has an area of 5,959.71 km^{2} (2,301.06 sq mi) and a population of 180,000 in 2018, making it one of the smallest counties by population in Sichuan.

== History ==
The history of Pingwu goes back over 1,700 years. In 108 CE, the Eastern Han established Guanghan County, which was ruled from present day Wen County. Beginning in the 3rd century CE, a number of kingdoms belonging to the Di tribe were set up in and around Pingwu County. In 280 Pingwu County was first established. The name Pingwu originates from the name of the previous Yinping (阴平) and Guangwu (广武) counties.

In 347, Pingwu became part of the Eastern Jin.

By the 6th century, the Di kingdoms saw their power wane, and much of the area surrounding present-day Pingwu County was integrated into the Yarlung dynasty. Despite this, the area of contemporary Pingwu County was not occupied by the Yarlung dynasty during the 7th century, resulting in a linguistic identity more akin to that of the Di tribe.

== Geography and climate ==
Pingwu is a mountainous county located along the upper reaches of the Fujiang river, in the far northwest of the Sichuan Basin. 94% of the county's area is above 1,000 m elevation. The average yearly temperature is 14.7 °C (58.5 °F).

Climate data for Pingwu, elevation 893 m (2,930 ft), (1991–2020 normals, extremes 1991–present)
Month	Jan	Feb	Mar	Apr	May	Jun	Jul	Aug	Sep	Oct	Nov	Dec	Year
Record high °C (°F)	19.5 (67.1)	24.4 (75.9)	30.6 (87.1)	34.2 (93.6)	35.7 (96.3)	38.0 (100.4)	39.1 (102.4)	36.9 (98.4)	34.2 (93.6)	31.2 (88.2)	24.9 (76.8)	18.5 (65.3)	39.1 (102.4)
Mean daily maximum °C (°F)	9.5 (49.1)	12.1 (53.8)	16.9 (62.4)	22.7 (72.9)	26.1 (79.0)	28.7 (83.7)	30.2 (86.4)	29.4 (84.9)	24.7 (76.5)	19.9 (67.8)	15.5 (59.9)	10.8 (51.4)	20.5 (69.0)
Daily mean °C (°F)	4.4 (39.9)	7.0 (44.6)	11.3 (52.3)	16.1 (61.0)	19.6 (67.3)	22.5 (72.5)	24.3 (75.7)	23.6 (74.5)	19.7 (67.5)	15.3 (59.5)	10.5 (50.9)	5.6 (42.1)	15.0 (59.0)
Mean daily minimum °C (°F)	1.1 (34.0)	3.6 (38.5)	7.4 (45.3)	11.6 (52.9)	15.1 (59.2)	18.4 (65.1)	20.4 (68.7)	20.1 (68.2)	17.0 (62.6)	12.8 (55.0)	7.6 (45.7)	2.4 (36.3)	11.5 (52.6)
Record low °C (°F)	−6.4 (20.5)	−4.8 (23.4)	−0.7 (30.7)	2.9 (37.2)	7.9 (46.2)	12.9 (55.2)	15.0 (59.0)	14.6 (58.3)	10.0 (50.0)	4.5 (40.1)	−0.9 (30.4)	−5.8 (21.6)	−6.4 (20.5)
Average precipitation mm (inches)	3.6 (0.14)	7.0 (0.28)	21.4 (0.84)	53.1 (2.09)	87.2 (3.43)	92.8 (3.65)	178.2 (7.02)	178.5 (7.03)	105.9 (4.17)	55.1 (2.17)	13.7 (0.54)	2.5 (0.10)	799 (31.46)
Average precipitation days (≥ 0.1 mm)	5.2	6.2	10.2	13.5	16.3	15.3	16.0	15.9	17.9	16.2	6.5	3.1	142.3
Average snowy days	4.2	2.1	0.2	0	0	0	0	0	0	0	0.1	1.1	7.7
Average relative humidity (%)	67	66	65	67	69	72	75	78	82	81	77	70	72
Mean monthly sunshine hours	95.4	78.4	99.6	133.7	146.6	123.8	137.3	138.8	80.4	73.3	87.4	99.4	1,294.1
Percentage possible sunshine	30	25	27	34	34	29	32	34	22	21	28	32	29
Source: China Meteorological Administration

== Economy ==
Pingwu is a large production base of Shiitake and wood ear mushroom, with an output of 1.1 million kg in 2009.

== Administrative divisions ==
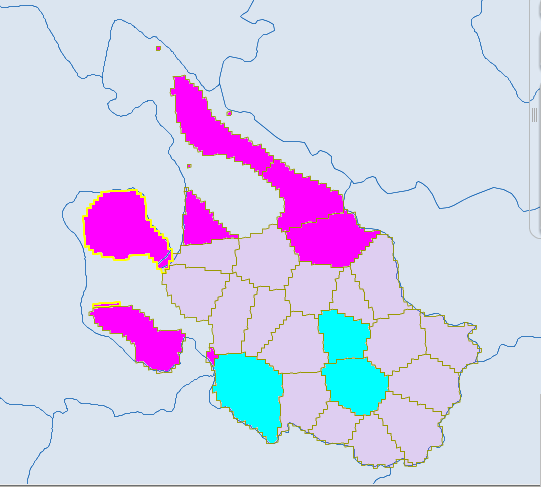
Purple -Qiang. Red -Tibetan.

Pingwu County has six towns, two townships, and twelve ethnic townships.

Towns

- Long'an (龙安镇)
- Gucheng (古城镇)
- Xiangyan (响岩镇)
- Daqiao (大桥镇)
- Shuijing (水晶镇)
- Jiangyouguan (江油关镇)

Townships

- Gaocun Township (高村乡)
- Bazi Township (坝子乡)

Ethnic townships

- Suojiang Qiang Ethnic Township (锁江羌族乡)
- Tucheng Tibetan Ethnic Township (土城藏族乡)
- Jiubu Qiang Ethnic Township (旧堡羌族乡)
- Kuoda Tibetan Ethnic Township (阔达藏族乡)
- Huangyangguan Tibetan Ethnic Township (黄羊关藏族乡)
- Huya Tibetan Ethnic Township (虎牙藏族乡, ཧོས་ཡའ་བོད་རིགས་གྲོང་ཚོ་)
- Si'er Tibetan Ethnic Township (泗耳藏族乡)
- Baima Tibetan Ethnic Township (白马藏族乡)
- Muzuo Tibetan Ethnic Township (木座藏族乡)
- Mupi Tibetan Ethnic Township (木皮藏族乡, མུ་ཕིས་བོད་རིགས་ཞང་།)
- Doukou Qiang Ethnic Township (豆叩羌族乡)
- Pingtong Qiang Ethnic Township (平通羌族乡)

== Demographics ==
=== Languages ===
Pingwu County is one of three counties in Sichuan where the Baima language is spoken.

== Attractions ==
Pingwu county is the center of the biggest remaining giant panda habitat in China, i.e. the Minshan Mountains. Close to the Baima Ethnic Township, for example, the national panda reserve "Wanglang" is located. The WWF has conducted an Integrated Community Development Project in the Baima township to reduce direct and indirect poaching threats to the panda population. Bao'en Temple, a Buddhist monastery dating back to the 15th century, is located in Pingwu County.

== Fauna ==
There are two species of Megophryidae frogs endemic to Pingwu County, namely Scutiger pingwuensis and Oreolalax chuanbeiensis.

== Notable residents ==
- Li Ziqi (vlogger)

== See also ==
- 1976 Songpan-Pingwu earthquake
