= Fei Liang =

Chinese herpetologist (1936–2022)

- 费梁
- Born: 1936; China
- Died: 4 June 2022 (aged 85–86); Chengdu, China
- Education: Sichuan Agricultural University
- Known for: Discovery of 126 new species and records of amphibians
- Spouse: Ye Changyuan (m. 1963–2022)
- Scientific career
- Fields: Herpetology
- Workplaces: Chengdu Institute of Biology

Fei Liang (Chinese: 费梁; 1936 – 4 June 2022) was a Chinese herpetologist.

== Biography ==
Fei was admitted to Sichuan Agricultural University in 1956 where he majored in animal husbandry. After graduating in 1961, he began working for the Chengdu Institute of Biology, where he began research on amphibians. He started as an assistant to amphibian research experts Liu Cheng-Chao and Hu Shuqin, but began leading a team of researchers in 1980 alongside his wife, Ye Changyuan. In total, the couple are credited with discovering over 126 new species.

Fei Liang died in Chengdu on 4 June 2022.
