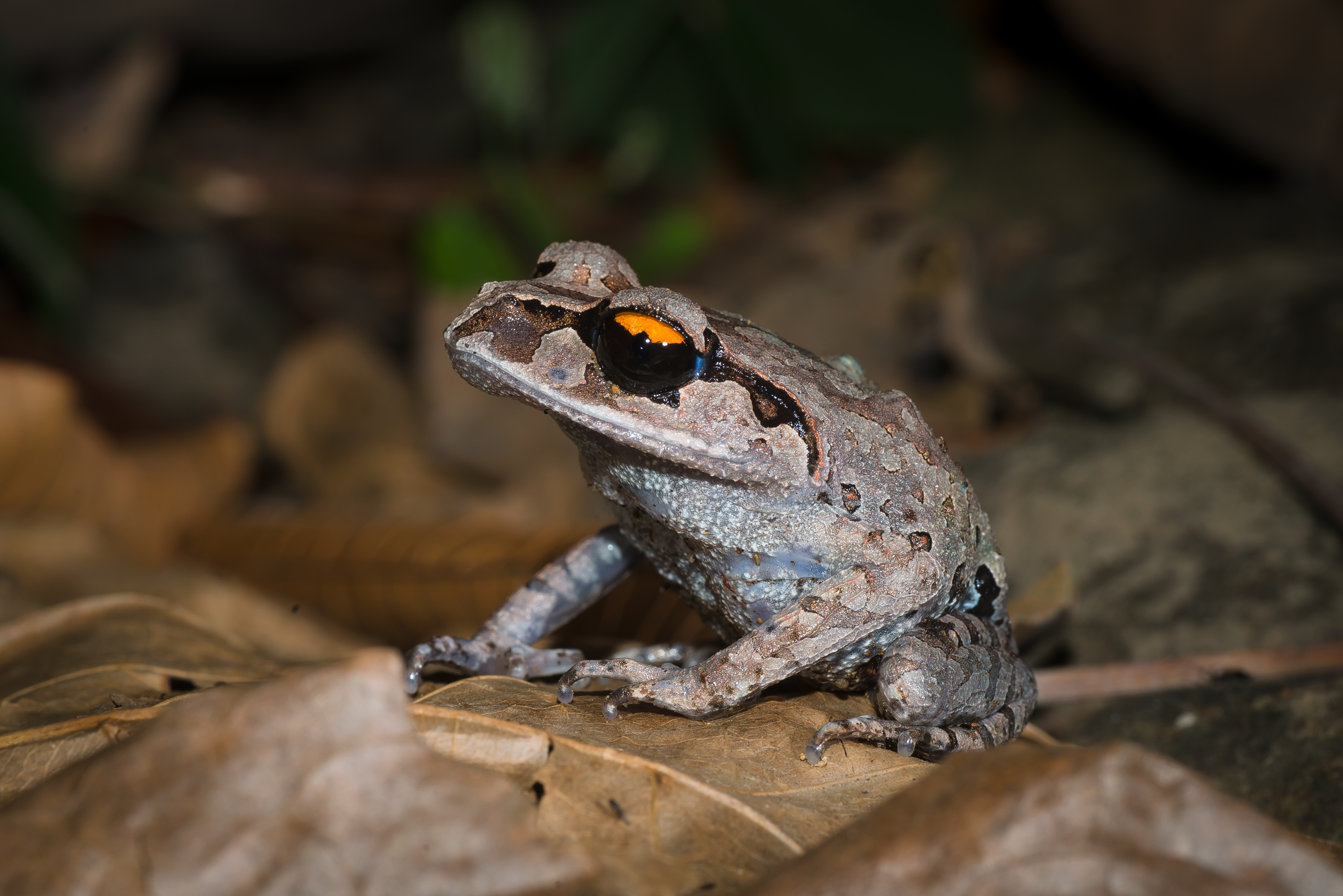

Conservation status
- Least Concern (IUCN 3.1)

Scientific classification
- Kingdom: Animalia
- Phylum: Chordata
- Class: Amphibia
- Order: Anura
- Family: Megophryidae
- Genus: Leptobrachium
- Species: L. smithi

Binomial name
- Leptobrachium smithi Matsui, Nabhitabhata, and Panha, 1999

= Leptobrachium smithi =

Species of amphibian

Leptobrachium smithi (common name Smith's litter frog) is a species of frog found in Southeast Asia. Its specific name honours Malcolm Arthur Smith, one of the early herpetologists to study the amphibians of Thailand.

== Description ==
Leptobrachium smithi is a moderate-sized Leptobrachium, with males measuring 36–68 mm (1.4–2.7 in) snout-vent length and females 50–78 mm (2.0–3.1 in) SVL. They have a relatively big, depressed head with striking eyes with upper half of iris scarlet or yellow. Skin above is nearly smooth but with minute granules scattered behind, especially around vent; ventrally granular.

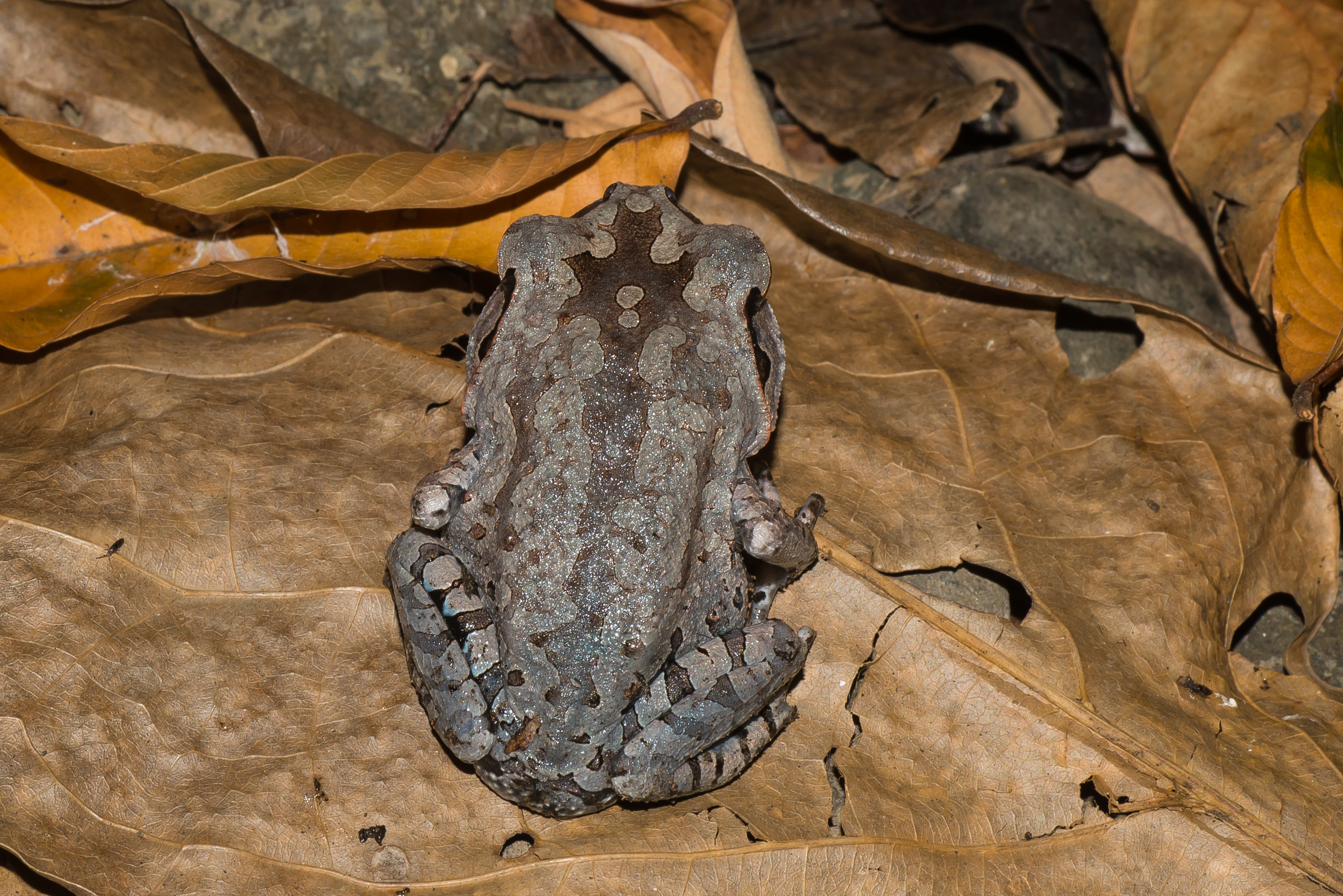
Back of Leptobrachium smithi

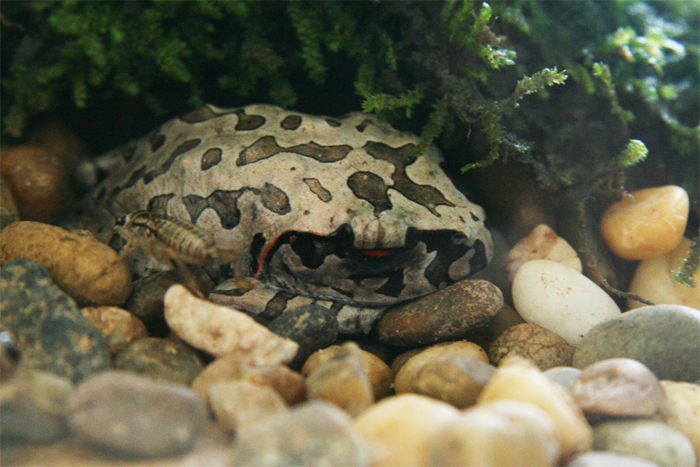

== Distribution ==
Its type locality is Ton Nam Plu Waterfall, Khao Chong, in Trang Province, southern Thailand. It is also known from adjacent southern Myanmar and from Laos. It may also occur in northeastern India and Bangladesh and in Peninsular Malaysia (Pulau Langkawi). Prior to its description, it was confused with Leptobrachium hasseltii and Leptobrachium pullum. Leptobrachium smithi is a locally common species that is found on the ground in evergreen forest in monsoon and rainforest climatic regions, as well as dense mixed deciduous forest. Tadpoles are found in deep sections of forest streams with little current.
