= Leptobrachium kanowitense =

Scientific classification
- Kingdom: Animalia
- Phylum: Chordata
- Class: Amphibia
- Order: Anura
- Family: Megophryidae
- Genus: Leptobrachium
- Species: L. kanowitense

Binomial name
- Leptobrachium kanowitense Hamidy, Matsui, Nishikawa, and Belabut, 2012

Species of frog

Leptobrachium kanowitense is a species of frog in the family Megophryidae from Borneo. It was recently distinguished as a separate species from within the Leptobrachium nigrops species complex.
