= Leptobrachella tengchongensis =

Conservation status
- Endangered (IUCN 3.1)

Scientific classification
- Kingdom: Animalia
- Phylum: Chordata
- Class: Amphibia
- Order: Anura
- Family: Megophryidae
- Genus: Leptobrachella
- Species: L. tengchongensis

Binomial name
- Leptobrachella tengchongensis (Yang, Wang, Chen, and Rao, 2016)

Synonyms
- Leptolalax tengchongensis Yang et al. 2016

Species of frog

Leptobrachella tengchongensis is a species of frog in the family Megophryidae from the Gaoligong Mountains of Tengchong County, Yunnan, China. It is sympatric with Leptobrachium tengchongense.
