= Leptobrachium mangyanorum =

Conservation status
- Vulnerable (IUCN 3.1)

Scientific classification
- Kingdom: Animalia
- Phylum: Chordata
- Class: Amphibia
- Order: Anura
- Family: Megophryidae
- Genus: Leptobrachium
- Species: L. mangyanorum

Binomial name
- Leptobrachium mangyanorum Brown, Siler, Diesmos, and Alcala, 2010 "2009"

Species of frog

Leptobrachium mangyanorum is a species of frog in the family Megophryidae. It is endemic to the Philippines and known with certainty only from the island of Mindoro, although it might also occur on the nearby Semirara Island. Even though this species was formally described only in 2010, Edward Harrison Taylor had already in 1920s recognized that it is distinct from Leptobrachium hasseltii, the name used for Philippine Leptobrachium at the time. Common name Mindoro litter frog has been coined for this species.

== Description ==
Adult males measure 36–49 mm (1.4–1.9 in) and adult females 46–59 mm (1.8–2.3 in) in snout–vent length. The overall appearance is stocky. The head is wider than the body. The snout is rounded. The tympanum is obliquely ovoid and weakly distinct. The fingers and the toes have rounded, slightly to moderately expanded tips and no webbing. The dorsum is brown or gray, with variable markings. In some individuals, these markings consist of several large, darker, irregular blotches and semicircular spots with black borders, while in others, they are limited to the posterior portions of the head or the interorbital region. The darker dorsal coloration fades on the flanks. In most individuals, the venter is uniform dark gray with minute white spots on the warts. Some individuals, however, have white or cream ventral coloration, with distinctive dark gray marbling. Most individuals have dark transverse bars on dorsal surfaces of their limbs. The eyes are black with a deep blue scleral arc under the eyelid

The call is an elongate series of low-frequency paired grunts, which to the human ear sound like slow gurgling, "wher-err, wher-err, wher-err, …".

== Habitat and conservation ==
Leptobrachium mangyanorum occurs in a wide variety of habitats, from pristine higher elevation forests to highly disturbed, near coastal regions; its elevational range is 0–1,200 m (0–3,937 ft) above sea level. Males seem to tolerate exposure and call from perches such as stumps and rocks, or on open forest floor or leaf litter. Male choruses are loose aggregations that stretch over some distance on the forest floor.

The species is common along clear mountain streams and rivers, and seems to tolerate a degree of habitat disturbance. Nevertheless, habitat loss caused by shifting, slash-and-burn agriculture and small-scale wood collection is threatening this species. Furthermore, tadpoles are locally harvested for human consumption. It is present in the Mount Calavite Wildlife Sanctuary and Mounts Iglit–Baco National Park.
