= Indonesiensis =

Indonesiensis may refer to:

- Rhacophorus indonesiensis, species of frog
- Streptomyces indonesiensis, species of bacteria
