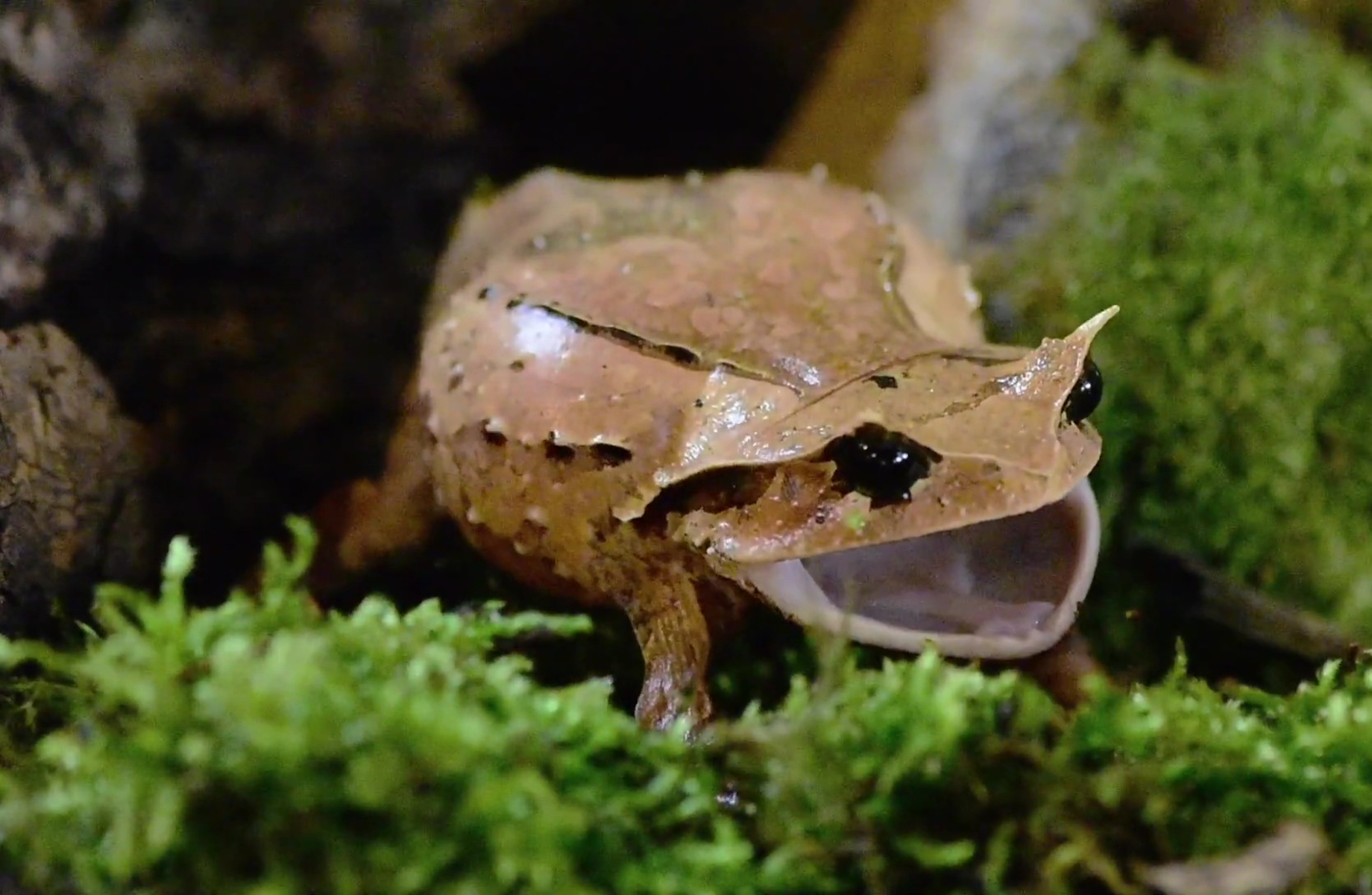

Conservation status
- Least Concern (IUCN 3.1)

Scientific classification
- Kingdom: Animalia
- Phylum: Chordata
- Class: Amphibia
- Order: Anura
- Family: Megophryidae
- Genus: Brachytarsophrys
- Species: B. intermedius

Binomial name
- Brachytarsophrys intermedius (Smith, 1921)

Synonyms
- Megalophrys intermedius Smith, 1921; Megophrys intermedius Bourret, 1942; Megophrys intermedia Dubois, 1980; Brachytarsophrys intermedia Rao & Yang, 1997

= Brachytarsophrys intermedius =

Species of frog

Brachytarsophrys intermedius (common name: Annam spadefoot toad) is a species of frog in the family Megophryidae. It is found in the Central Highlands of southern Vietnam, Laos, and possibly Cambodia. This species might be a synonym of Brachytarsophrys carinense.

Its natural habitats are tropical forests. It is threatened by habitat loss caused by clear cutting and human settlement.
