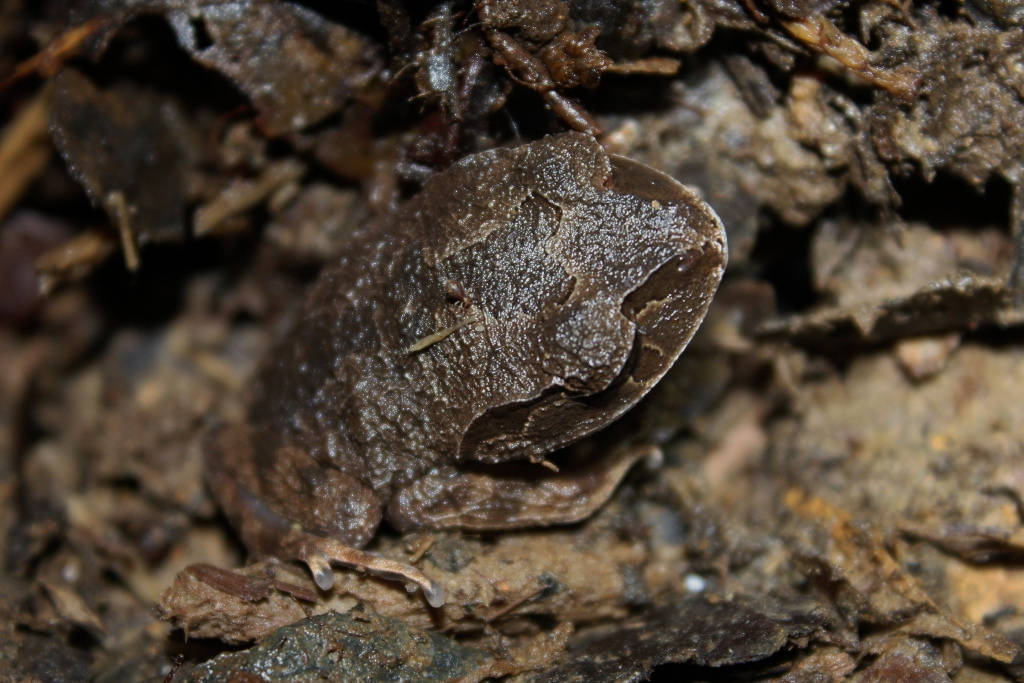

Conservation status
- Near Threatened (IUCN 3.1)

Scientific classification
- Kingdom: Animalia
- Phylum: Chordata
- Class: Amphibia
- Order: Anura
- Family: Megophryidae
- Genus: Leptobrachium
- Species: L. gunungense

Binomial name
- Leptobrachium gunungense Malkmus, 1996

Synonyms
- Leptobrachium gunungensis Malkmus, 1996

= Leptobrachium gunungense =

Species of amphibian

Leptobrachium gunungense (also known as the Asian litter frog) is a species of amphibian in the family Megophryidae. It is endemic to Malaysia. Its natural habitats are subtropical or tropical moist montane forests and rivers.
