= Leptobrachium aryatium =

Scientific classification
- Kingdom: Animalia
- Phylum: Chordata
- Class: Amphibia
- Order: Anura
- Family: Megophryidae
- Genus: Leptobrachium
- Species: L. aryatium

Binomial name
- Leptobrachium aryatium Purkayastha et al., 2025

Species of amphibian

Leptobrachium aryatium is a species of toad in the genus Leptobrachium which was described from Garbhanga Reserve Forest, Assam, India. The specific name 'arya' was given to honor the college where the author worked and specimen is kept. It is a medium-sized frog with adult SVL is 49.0–55.4 mm for males and 53.2–61.65 mm for females. Phylogenetic analyses showed that Leptobrachium aryatium is sister lineage to the clade comprising L. sylheticum and L. smithi
