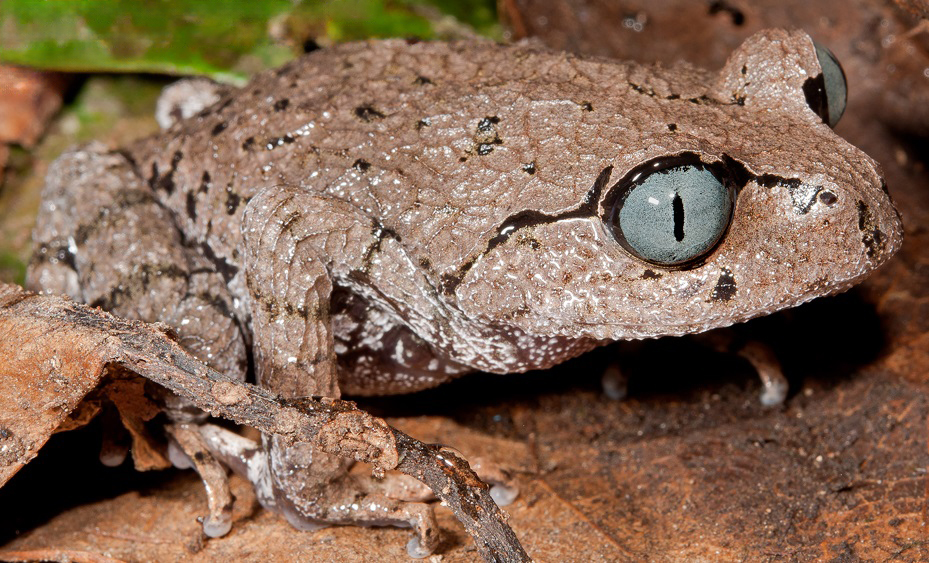

Scientific classification
- Kingdom: Animalia
- Phylum: Chordata
- Class: Amphibia
- Order: Anura
- Family: Megophryidae
- Genus: Leptobrachium
- Species: L. bompu

Binomial name
- Leptobrachium bompu Sondhi and Ohler, 2011

= Leptobrachium bompu =

Species of amphibian

Leptobrachium bompu is an extant species of eastern spadefoot toads described in 2011. It is only known from its type locality in the Eaglenest Wildlife Sanctuary in Arunachal Pradesh, Northeast India. The specific name refers to the camp site, Bompu, in the vicinity of the type locality.

== Description ==
Leptobrachium bompu is known from three specimens, one of them collected as the holotype. This male measured 47 mm (1.9 in) in snout-vent length. One of the distinguishing characters of this species is its entirely greyish-blue eye colour. Its body is roundish and its head is wider than long. It lacks the spines on upper lip in adult males that are often present in Leptobrachium subgenus Vibrissaphora. Its back and head are greyish-brown getting lighter on flanks; sides of head and body have brownish shine.

== Habitat and behaviour ==
The type locality was a slow-flowing perennial stream in a wet subtropical/temperate hill forest. Males could be heard calling after sunset and were found under leaf litter by the stream. The call was a loud croaking "kek-kek-kek-kek". The frogs were docile, found sitting in a crouched position and easily picked up.

== See also ==
- List of amphibians of India
