= Leptobrachium xanthops =

Conservation status
- Endangered (IUCN 3.1)

Scientific classification
- Kingdom: Animalia
- Phylum: Chordata
- Class: Amphibia
- Order: Anura
- Family: Megophryidae
- Genus: Leptobrachium
- Species: L. xanthops

Binomial name
- Leptobrachium xanthops Stuart, Phimmachak, Seateun, and Sivongxay, 2012

Species of amphibian

Leptobrachium xanthops is a species of frogs in the family Megophryidae from southeastern Laos. It is known only from the Dak Cheung Plateau of Phou Ajol Mountain, Dak Cheung District, Sekong Province, Laos. It may also occur in adjacent areas of northwestern Quang Nam Province, Vietnam, as well as in Xe Sap National Protected Area, Laos, and Song Thanh Nature Reserve, Vietnam.
