= Brachytarsophrys orientalis =

Scientific classification
- Kingdom: Animalia
- Phylum: Chordata
- Class: Amphibia
- Order: Anura
- Family: Megophryidae
- Genus: Brachytarsophrys
- Species: B. orientalis

Binomial name
- Brachytarsophrys orientalis Li, Lyu, Wang, and Wang, 2020

Species of amphibian

Brachytarsophrys orientalis, the Oriental short-legged toad, is a species of litter frog in the family Megophryidae. It is native to Jiangxi and Fujian in southeastern China. It is the easternmost species within the genus Brachytarsophrys, hence the specific name orientalis.

== Description ==
This species is different from other short-legged toads because of its smaller adult size, moderate webbing, and the tadpoles lacking transversal stripes on their chest. Males of this species reach 76.8 to 82.7 mm (3 to 3.3 in) SVL and females reach around 88.6 mm (3.5 in) SVL. The male develops nuptial pads on the dorsal surface of the last and second fingers and calls during August from under rocks in streams.

== Habitat and conservation ==
Brachytarsophrys orientalis is known from montane streams surrounded by moist subtropical evergreen broadleaf forest at elevations between 200 and 700 m (660 and 2,300 ft) above sea level. Males call from hidden positions under rocks.

As of March 2021, this species has not been included in the IUCN Red List of Threatened Species. It is present in two protected areas, Jiulianshan Nature Reserve (its type locality) in Jiangxi and Huboliao Natural Reserve in Fujian.
