= Leptobrachium waysepuntiense =

Conservation status
- Least Concern (IUCN 3.1)

Scientific classification
- Kingdom: Animalia
- Phylum: Chordata
- Class: Amphibia
- Order: Anura
- Family: Megophryidae
- Genus: Leptobrachium
- Species: L. waysepuntiense

Binomial name
- Leptobrachium waysepuntiense Hamidy and Matsui, 2010

Species of frog

Leptobrachium waysepuntiense is a species of frog in the family Megophryidae. It is endemic to southwestern Sumatra, Indonesia. Its type locality is Kubu Perahu village, Liwa District, West Lampung Regency, Lampung Province, Sumatra. It has blue eyes, and accordingly, common name blue-eyed litter frog has been proposed for it.

== Description ==
The type series consists of one adult female (holotype), one adult male, and a juvenile. The female measures 58 mm (2.3 in) and the male 50 mm (2.0 in) in snout–vent length. The head is broad and dorsoventrally depressed. The snout is rounded in dorsal view and truncate in lateral view. The tympanum is distinct. The finger and toe tips are rounded. The toes have some webbing whereas the fingers are unwebbed. The dorsal coloration is dark brownish gray, fading to laterally to light grey of the ventral side. The supratympanic ridge is bordered by a very thin brownish orange line. There are white and yellow dots on the belly and especially on the sides. The iris is light blue with black reticulations. The male has an internal vocal sac but lacks the keratinized spines (seen in some of its congeners) on its upper lip.

== Habitat and conservation ==
Leptobrachium waysepuntiense occurs in leaf litter of lowland rainforests as well as cacao and rubber plantations at elevations of 50–1,100 m (160–3,610 ft) above sea level. The major threat to this species is deforestation, which is primarily driven by expanding oil palm plantations. However, it has a relatively large range and is believed to have a large total population, and it is not considered threatened as a species. It is present in the Batang Toru Protection Forest and the Bukit Barisan Selatan National Park.
