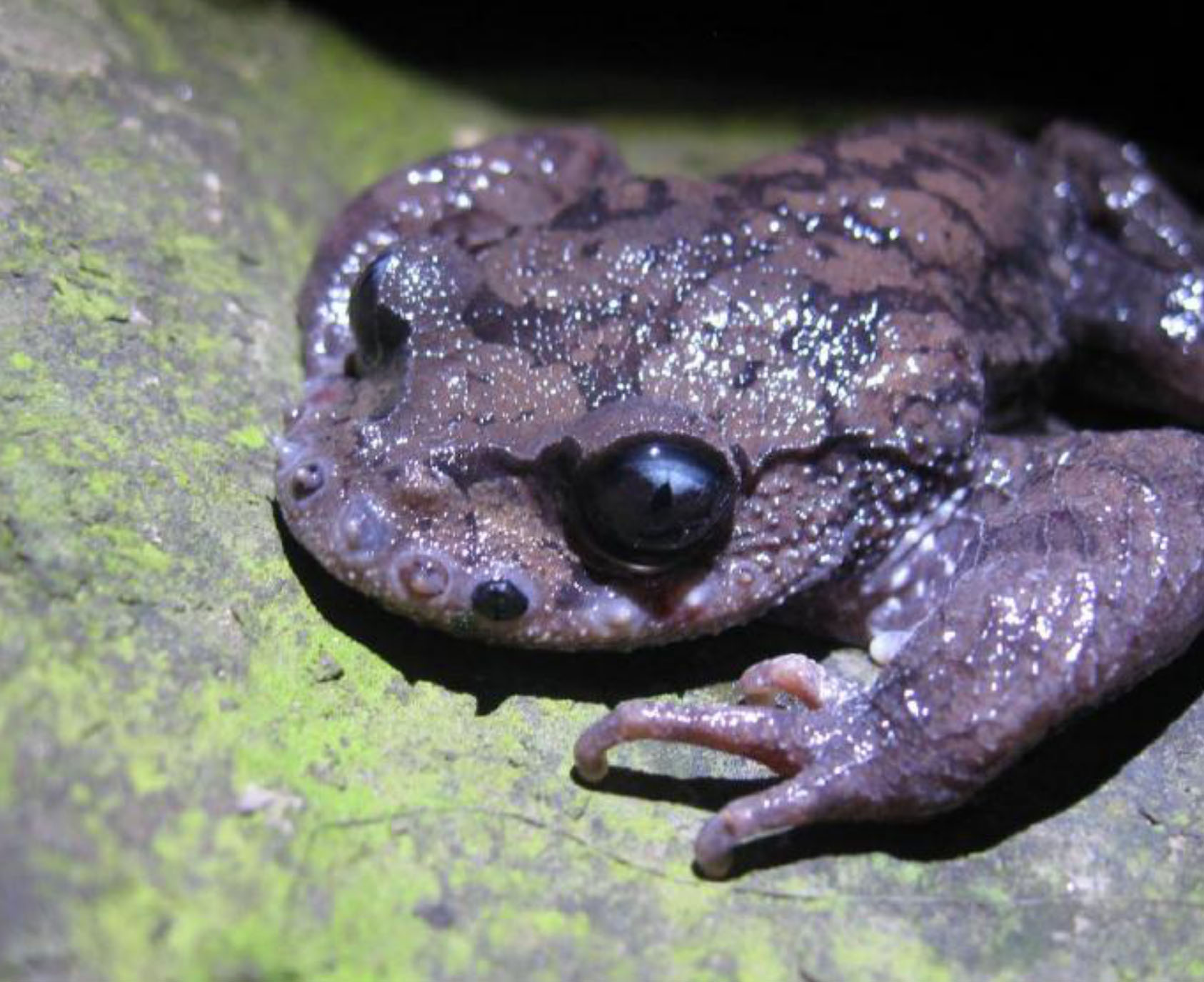
- Leptobrachium boringii male

Conservation status
- Endangered (IUCN 3.1)

Scientific classification
- Kingdom: Animalia
- Phylum: Chordata
- Class: Amphibia
- Order: Anura
- Family: Megophryidae
- Genus: Leptobrachium
- Species: L. boringii

Binomial name
- Leptobrachium boringii (Liu, 1945)

Synonyms
- Vibrissaphora boringii Liu, 1945

= Leptobrachium boringii =

Species of amphibian

Leptobrachium boringii, commonly known as the Emei moustache toad or Taosze spiny toad, is a species of amphibian in the family Megophryidae. It is endemic to China where it is found in Sichuan, Guizhou, and Hunan provinces. "Emei" or "Taosze" in its common names refer to its type locality, Taosze on Mount Emei, Sichuan. Its natural habitats are temperate forests, grassland, arable land, and rural gardens near rivers. It is threatened by habitat loss.

== Reproductive behaviour and strategies ==
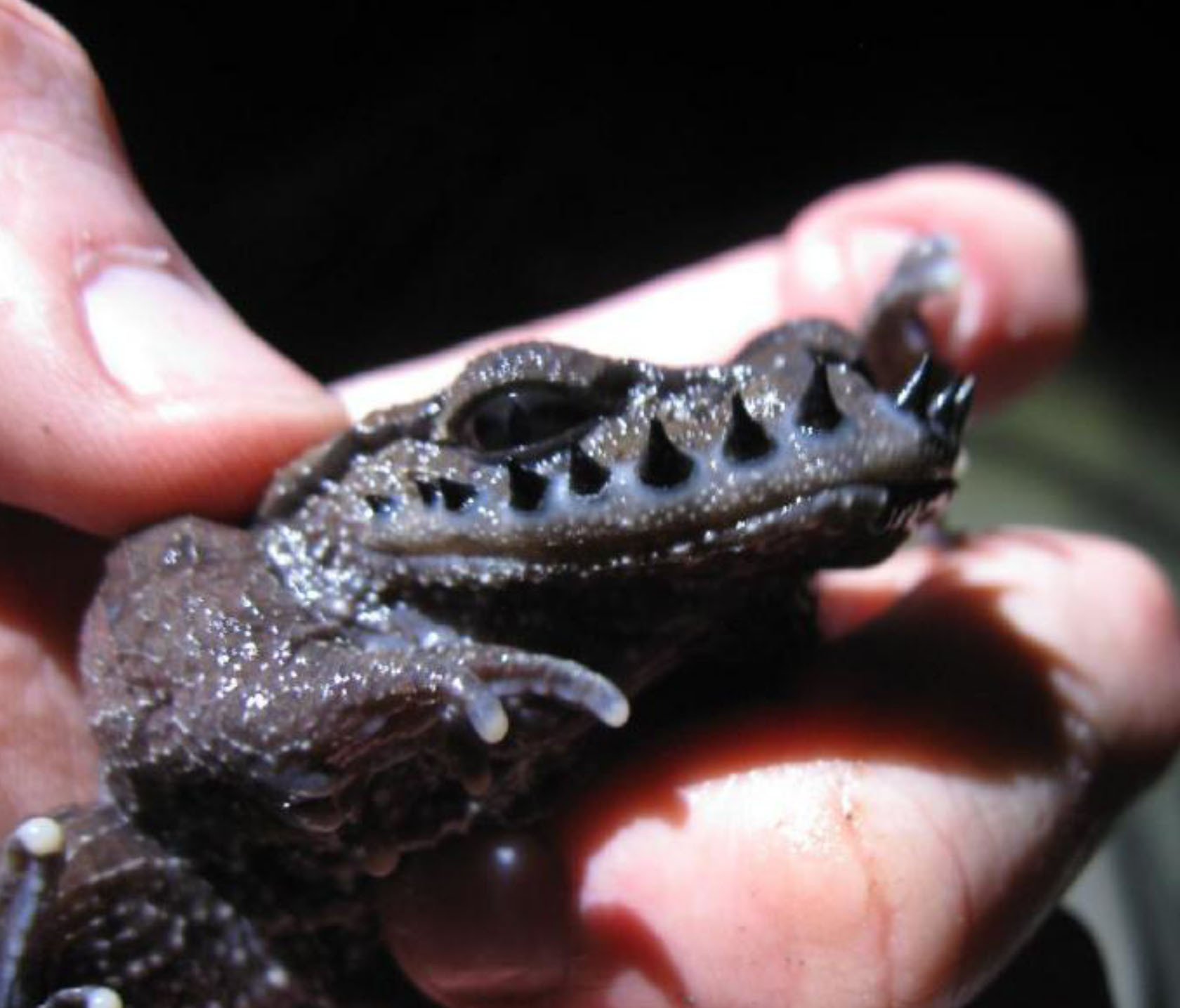
Leptobrachium boringii male at the height of the breeding season. Nuptial spines, the "moustache", are clearly visible.

Male Leptobrachium boringii exhibit conspicuous keratinized nuptial spines that grow on their upper lip during the breeding season—these are the "moustache" and "spines" referred to in its common names. Moreover, male Leptobrachium boringii are larger, on average 75 mm (3.0 in) in snout-vent length, than females, which are on average 67 mm (2.6 in) in SVL (female-biased sexual size dimorphism is more common in frogs). These unusual features seem to relate to male–male combat for best breeding territories and/or female preference for larger males. However, also multiple paternity could be observed, suggesting that some males use the sneaker strategy to fertilize eggs, instead of defending territories.
