= Leptobrachium promustache =

Conservation status
- Endangered (IUCN 3.1)

Scientific classification
- Kingdom: Animalia
- Phylum: Chordata
- Class: Amphibia
- Order: Anura
- Family: Megophryidae
- Genus: Leptobrachium
- Species: L. promustache

Binomial name
- Leptobrachium promustache (Rao, Wilkinson, and Zhang, 2006)

Synonyms
- Vibrissaphora promustache Rao, Wilkinson, and Zhang, 2006

Species of frog

Leptobrachium promustache is a species of frog in the family Megophryidae. It is only known from Hekou and Pingbian counties in southern Yunnan, China, and from Lào Cai Province in adjacent northwestern Vietnam. Common name primary moustache toad has been proposed for it.

== Description ==
Adult males measure 52–63 mm (2.0–2.5 in) and adult females 56–67 mm (2.2–2.6 in) in snout–vent length. The head is dorsoventrally flattened. The snout is rounded in dorsal view; males typically have more than 160 tiny black spines on the upper lip, whereas females have small white markings in generally similar positions. The tympanum is indistinct. The eyes are large and protuberant. The fingers have tapered tips and lateral fringes but no webbing. The toes have basal webbing and distinct lateral fringes. The dorsum is reddish brown to gray-brown with irregularly shaped black spots. The chest and throat are mostly white with some black mottling and many tiny dark-brown points. The iris is bicolored with light blue upper half and black lower half. Males have a single, internal subgular vocal sac.

== Habitat and conservation ==
Leptobrachium promustache is known from slow-flowing forested streams: a pair was found under a stone within the stream at the type locality, and calling males were found beside the stream, usually from just beneath the soil surface. The Vietnamese specimens were found in leaf litter on the forest floor; the identity of the tadpoles from nearby streams needs confirmation. The elevational range of this species is 1,300–2,100 m (4,300–6,900 ft) above sea level.

Leptobrachium promustache is a rare species. The type locality is well-protected reserve (Mount Dawei National Nature Reserve) where the only threat is development of infrastructure for tourists.
