= Leptobrachium leucops =

Conservation status
- Vulnerable (IUCN 3.1)

Scientific classification
- Kingdom: Animalia
- Phylum: Chordata
- Class: Amphibia
- Order: Anura
- Family: Megophryidae
- Genus: Leptobrachium
- Species: L. leucops

Binomial name
- Leptobrachium leucops Stuart, Rowley, Tran, Le, and Hoang, 2011

Species of frog

Leptobrachium leucops is a species of frog in the family Megophryidae. This toad was discovered in Bidoup Núi Bà National Park in Lâm Đồng Province, Central Highlands region of Vietnam by a group of American, Australian and Vietnamese scientists. The specific name leucops refer to its partly white pupils. It is sometimes known as the yin-yang frog.

Leptobrachium leucops was found at the altitude of around 1500–1900 m above sea level.

Leptobrachium leucops is nocturnal, has a length up to 4.5 cm (1.8 in) and have partly white pupils, ridges on their skin and several stripes on their four limbs.
