= Cyrtodactylus papeda =

Scientific classification
- Kingdom: Animalia
- Phylum: Chordata
- Class: Reptilia
- Order: Squamata
- Suborder: Gekkota
- Family: Gekkonidae
- Genus: Cyrtodactylus
- Species: C. papeda

Binomial name
- Cyrtodactylus papeda Riyanto, Faz, Amarasinghe, Munir, Fitriana, Hamidy, Kusrini, & Oliver, 2022

Species of lizard

Cyrtodactylus papeda is a species of gecko, a lizard in the family Gekkonidae. The species is endemic to Obi Island, Indonesia.
