= Mouhot's litter frog =

Conservation status
- Least Concern (IUCN 3.1)

Scientific classification
- Kingdom: Animalia
- Phylum: Chordata
- Class: Amphibia
- Order: Anura
- Family: Megophryidae
- Genus: Leptobrachium
- Species: L. mouhoti

Binomial name
- Leptobrachium mouhoti Stuart, Sok & Neang, 2006

Species of frog

Mouhot's litter frog (Leptobrachium mouhoti; Khmer: កង្កែបស្លឹកមួហួត, kangkaep slaek muae huot) is a species of frog in the family Megophryidae. It is endemic to Vietnam and eastern Cambodia. However, its taxonomic relationship with Leptobrachium pullum, and possible occurrence in Vietnam, is unclear.

== Range ==
It is known from:

- Quang Nam Province, Vietnam
- Quang Ngai Province, Vietnam
- Mondulkiri Province, Cambodia
- Ratanakiri Province, Cambodia

In Cambodia, it is known from Keo Seima Wildlife Sanctuary, Phnom Nam Lyr Wildlife Sanctuary, and Virachey National Park.
