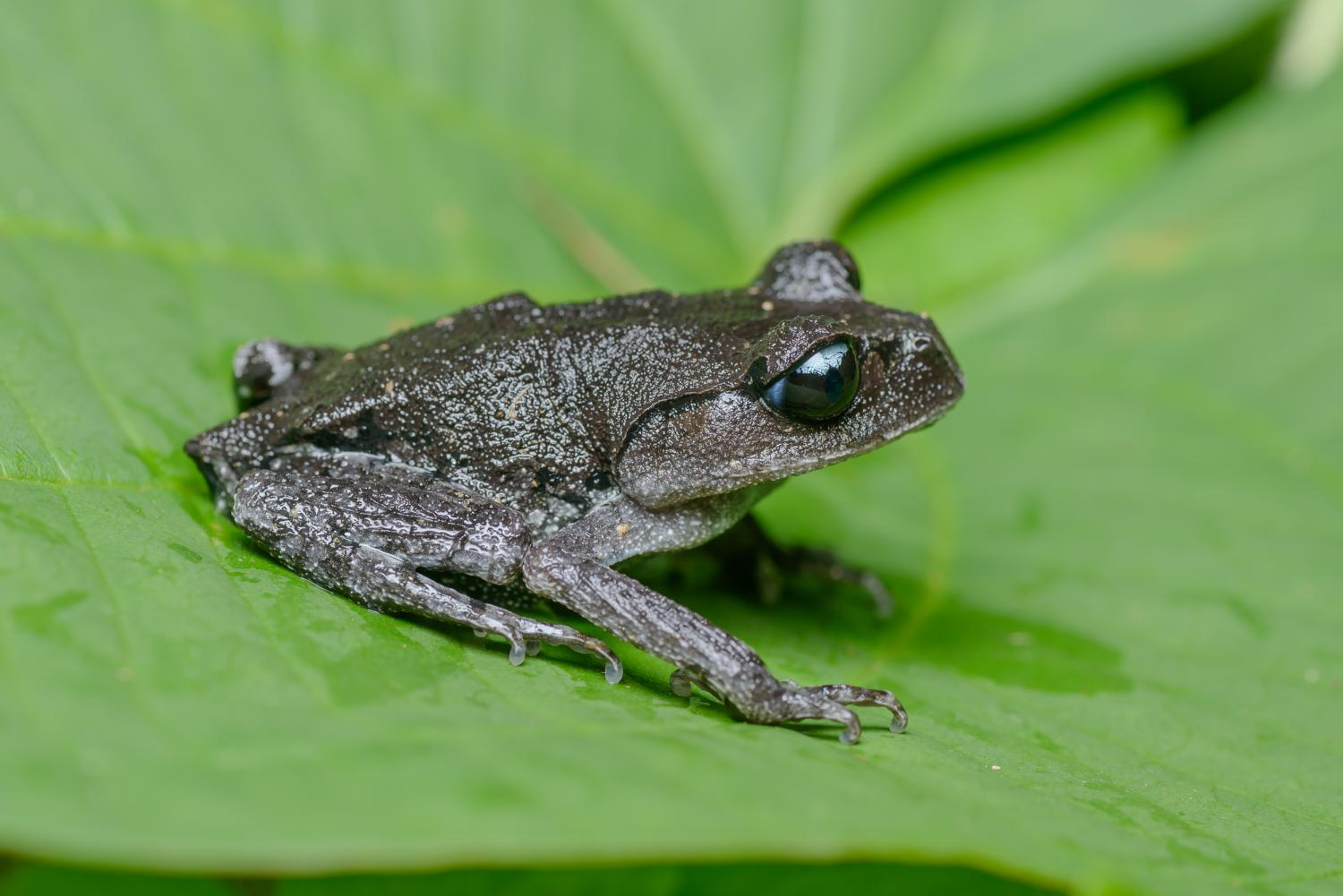

Scientific classification
- Kingdom: Animalia
- Phylum: Chordata
- Class: Amphibia
- Order: Anura
- Family: Megophryidae
- Genus: Leptobrachium
- Species: L. tenasserimense

Binomial name
- Leptobrachium tenasserimense Pawangkhanant, Poyarkov, Duong, Naiduangchan & Suwannapoom, 2018

= Tenasserim spadefoot toad =

Species of frog

Tenasserim spadefoot toad (Leptobrachium tenasserimense) is a species of toad from the Leptobrachium genus. The species is endemic to western Thailand and was scientifically described in 2018.
