= Leptobrachium kantonishikawai =

Scientific classification
- Kingdom: Animalia
- Phylum: Chordata
- Class: Amphibia
- Order: Anura
- Family: Megophryidae
- Genus: Leptobrachium
- Species: L. kantonishikawai

Binomial name
- Leptobrachium kantonishikawai Hamidy and Matsui, 2014

Species of amphibian

Leptobrachium kantonishikawai is a species of frogs in the family Megophryidae from Borneo.
