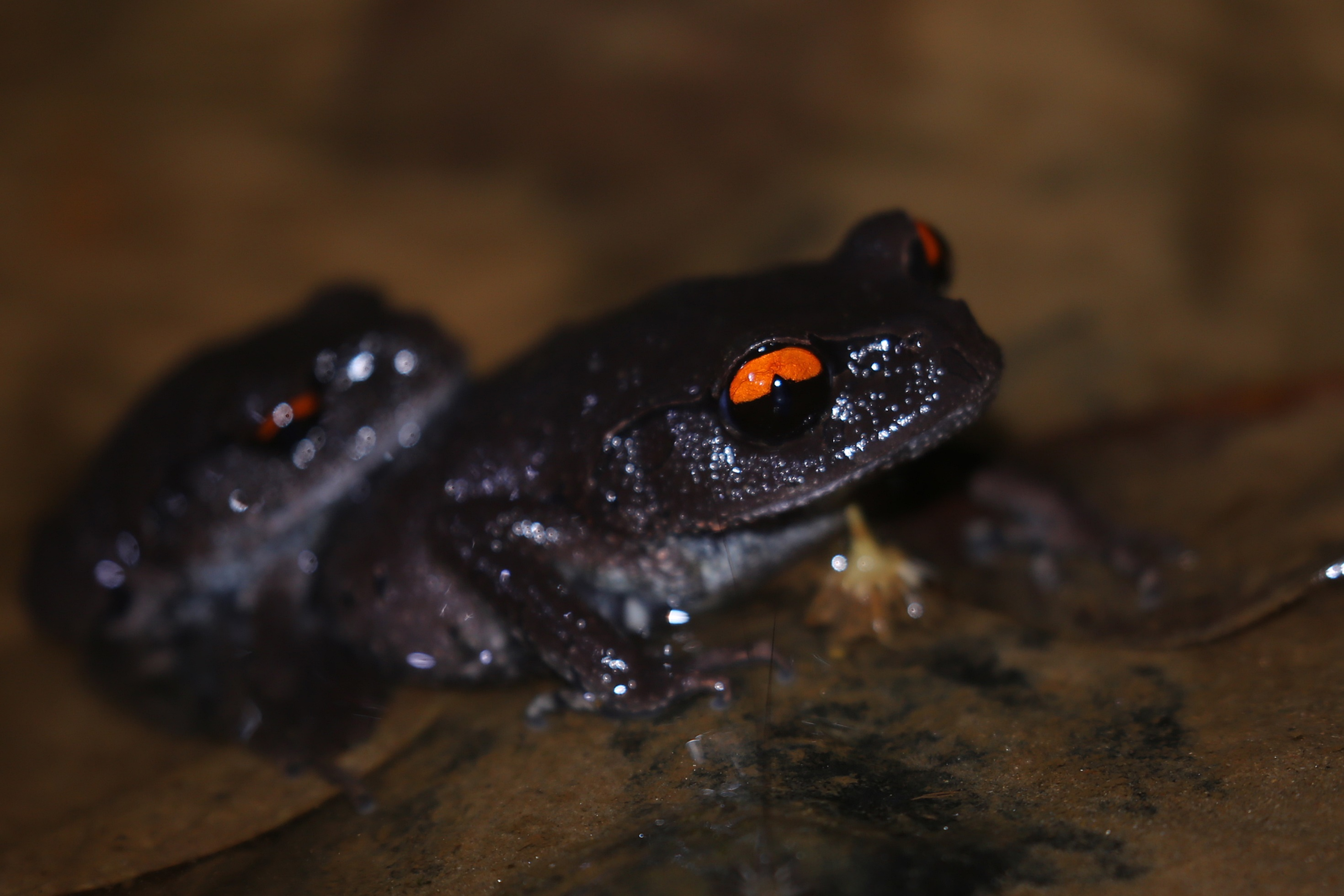
- Leptobrachium sylheticum captured in 2016

Scientific classification
- Kingdom: Animalia
- Phylum: Chordata
- Class: Amphibia
- Order: Anura
- Family: Megophryidae
- Genus: Leptobrachium
- Species: L. sylheticum

Binomial name
- Leptobrachium sylheticum Al-Razi, Maria & Poyarkov, 2021

= Leptobrachium sylheticum =

Species of frog

Leptobrachium sylheticum is a species of toad endemic to Sylhet Division of Bangladesh and adjacent Tripura state of northeastern India. The species was scientifically described in 2021.

== Distribution ==
Leptobrachium sylheticum is known from the lowland mixed evergreen forest of Lawachara National Park, Moulvibazar District, Sylhet Division, Bangladesh (24.325061° N, 91.786152° E), and adjacent areas in Tripura, India. The species inhabits tropical moist lowland forests, often near rivers and freshwater marshes, consistent with the ecological preferences of the Leptobrachium genus.

== Discovery ==
Leptobrachium sylheticum was identified and described as a new species in a scientific paper published in Zootaxa in 2021 based on specimens collected from Lawachara National Park on June 9, 2020, by Hassan Al-Razi and Marjan Maria. Prior to its formal description, records of Leptobrachium in northeastern India and Bangladesh were often attributed to L. smithi or L. rakhinense, but molecular assays confirmed L. sylheticum as a distinct species. The discovery highlights the cryptic diversity within the Leptobrachium genus, particularly in the Indo-Burma region.

The species name, sylheticum, is a Latinized adjective derived from "Sylhet," the administrative division in northeastern Bangladesh where the frog was first found.

== Description ==
As a member of the genus Leptobrachium, this species likely shares general characteristics with its close relatives, such as a robust body, relatively short limbs, and distinct tympana (eardrums). Specific details regarding its size, coloration, and unique morphological features would be elaborated upon in the full scientific description, distinguishing it from other Leptobrachium species found in the region.
