= Crawl frog =

Crawl frog may refer to:

- Bright yellow-eyed crawl frog (Leptobrachium hendricksoni), a frog in the family Megophryidae found in the Malay Peninsula (Southern Thailand and Peninsular Malaysia), Sarawak (Borneo), and Sumatra (Indonesia)
- Pygmy crawl frog (Leptolalax oshanensis), a frog in the family Megophryidae endemic to the Guizhou, Hubei, and Sichuan provinces in southern–central China
