= Brachytarsophrys chuannanensis =

Conservation status
- Near Threatened (IUCN 3.1)

Scientific classification
- Kingdom: Animalia
- Phylum: Chordata
- Class: Amphibia
- Order: Anura
- Family: Megophryidae
- Genus: Brachytarsophrys
- Species: B. chuannanensis

Binomial name
- Brachytarsophrys chuannanensis Fei, Ye & Huang, 2001

Species of amphibian

Brachytarsophrys chuannanensis (sometimes known as Chuanan short-legged toad) is a species of frogs in the family Megophryidae. It is endemic to southern Sichuan, China, in Junlian County and Hejiang County. However, the species may be more widespread than is currently known.

Its natural habitats are subtropical or tropical moist lowland forests, subtropical or tropical moist montane forests, and rivers. It is threatened by overharvesting by locals and habitat loss for agriculture, logging and human settlement. It may occur in protected areas but this needs more research.
