= Leptobrachium lumadorum =

Scientific classification
- Domain: Eukaryota
- Kingdom: Animalia
- Phylum: Chordata
- Class: Amphibia
- Order: Anura
- Family: Megophryidae
- Genus: Leptobrachium
- Species: L. lumadorum

Binomial name
- Leptobrachium lumadorum Brown et al., 2010

Species of frog

Leptobrachium lumadorum is a species of frog in the family Megophryidae from the islands of Basilan and Mindanao in the Philippines.
