= Leptobrachium ngoclinhense =

Conservation status
- Endangered (IUCN 3.1)

Scientific classification
- Kingdom: Animalia
- Phylum: Chordata
- Class: Amphibia
- Order: Anura
- Family: Megophryidae
- Genus: Leptobrachium
- Species: L. ngoclinhense

Binomial name
- Leptobrachium ngoclinhense (Orlov, 2005)

Synonyms
- Vibrissaphora ngoclinhensis Orlov, 2005

Species of frog

Leptobrachium ngoclinhense is a species of frog in the family Megophryidae from Vietnam.

== Range ==
It is known from two localities in southern Vietnam:

- Ngoc Linh Mountain, Dak Glei District, Kon Tum Province
- Chu Yang Sin Nature Reserve, Dak Lak Province
