= Leptobrachium tagbanorum =

Scientific classification
- Kingdom: Animalia
- Phylum: Chordata
- Class: Amphibia
- Order: Anura
- Family: Megophryidae
- Genus: Leptobrachium
- Species: L. tagbanorum

Binomial name
- Leptobrachium tagbanorum Brown, Siler, Diesmos, and Alcala, 2010

Species of frog

Leptobrachium tagbanorum is a species of frog in the family Megophryidae from Palawan, Philippines.
