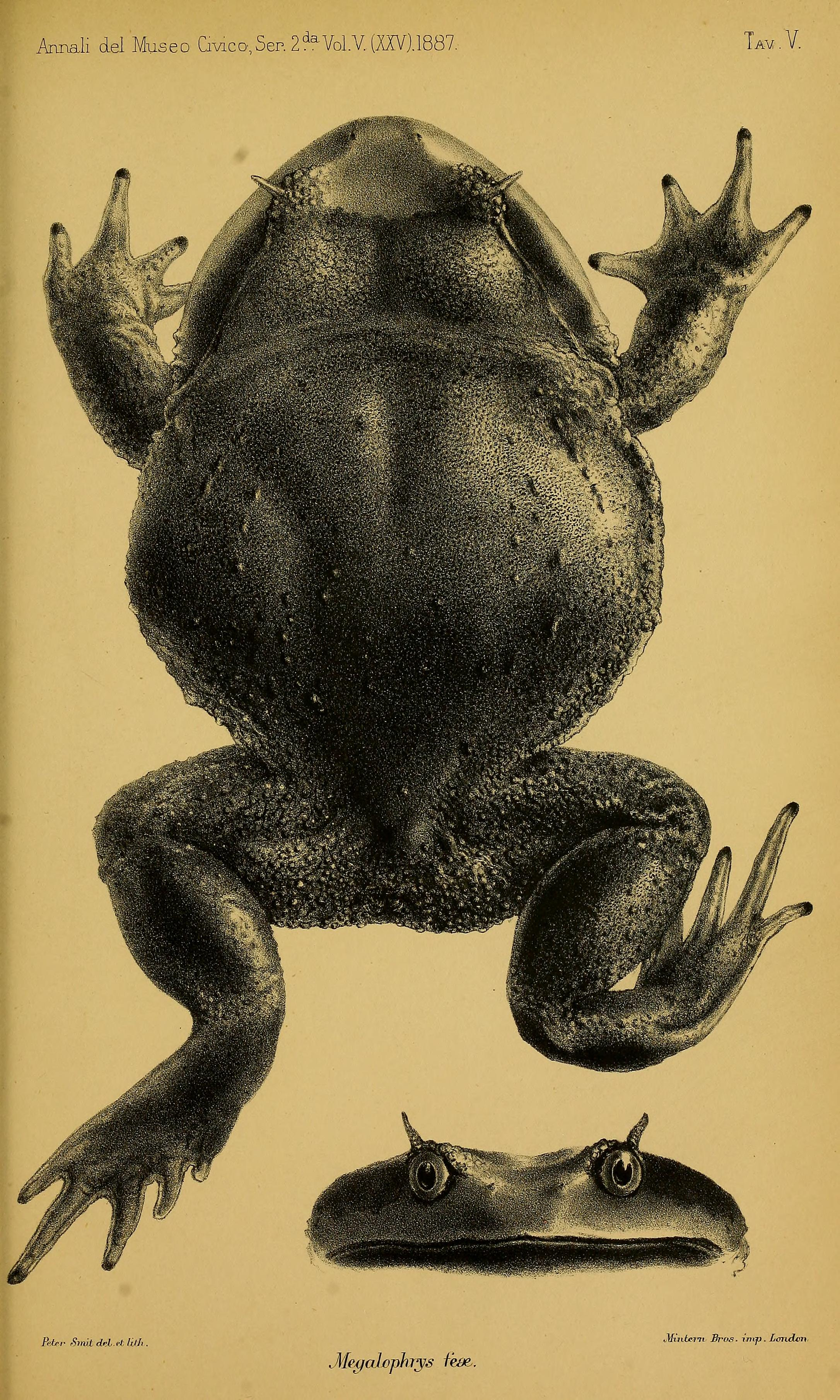

Conservation status
- Least Concern (IUCN 3.1)

Scientific classification
- Kingdom: Animalia
- Phylum: Chordata
- Class: Amphibia
- Order: Anura
- Family: Megophryidae
- Genus: Brachytarsophrys
- Species: B. feae

Binomial name
- Brachytarsophrys feae (Boulenger, 1887)

Synonyms
- Megalophrys feae Boulenger, 1887; Leptobrachium feae (Boulenger, 1887); Megophrys feae (Boulenger, 1887)

= Brachytarsophrys feae =

Species of amphibian

Brachytarsophrys feae (common names: Fea's horned frog, Fea's short-legged toad, Kakhien Hills spadefoot toad, and others) is a species of amphibian in the family Megophryidae. It is found in southern China (Guangxi and Yunnan) and northern Myanmar, Thailand, and Vietnam; it is likely to occur in Laos. The specific name feae honors Leonardo Fea, an Italian explorer, zoologist, and naturalist.

== Description ==
Brachytarsophrys feae are large frogs: males grow to about 96 mm (3.8 in) and females to about 101 mm (4.0 in) in snout-vent length. Tadpoles are small in comparison, about 39 mm (1.5 in) in length.

== Behaviour ==
Male Brachytarsophrys feae appear to be territorial. Their advertisement call is loud and can be likened to barking. Limited data suggest that chorusing occurs only in rainy nights; otherwise males remain hidden in their stream-side burrows.

== Habitat and conservation ==
Its natural habitats are evergreen broadleaf forest and streams; it breeds in streams. It is threatened by habitat loss caused by dams and power plants, and it is also collected for consumption.
