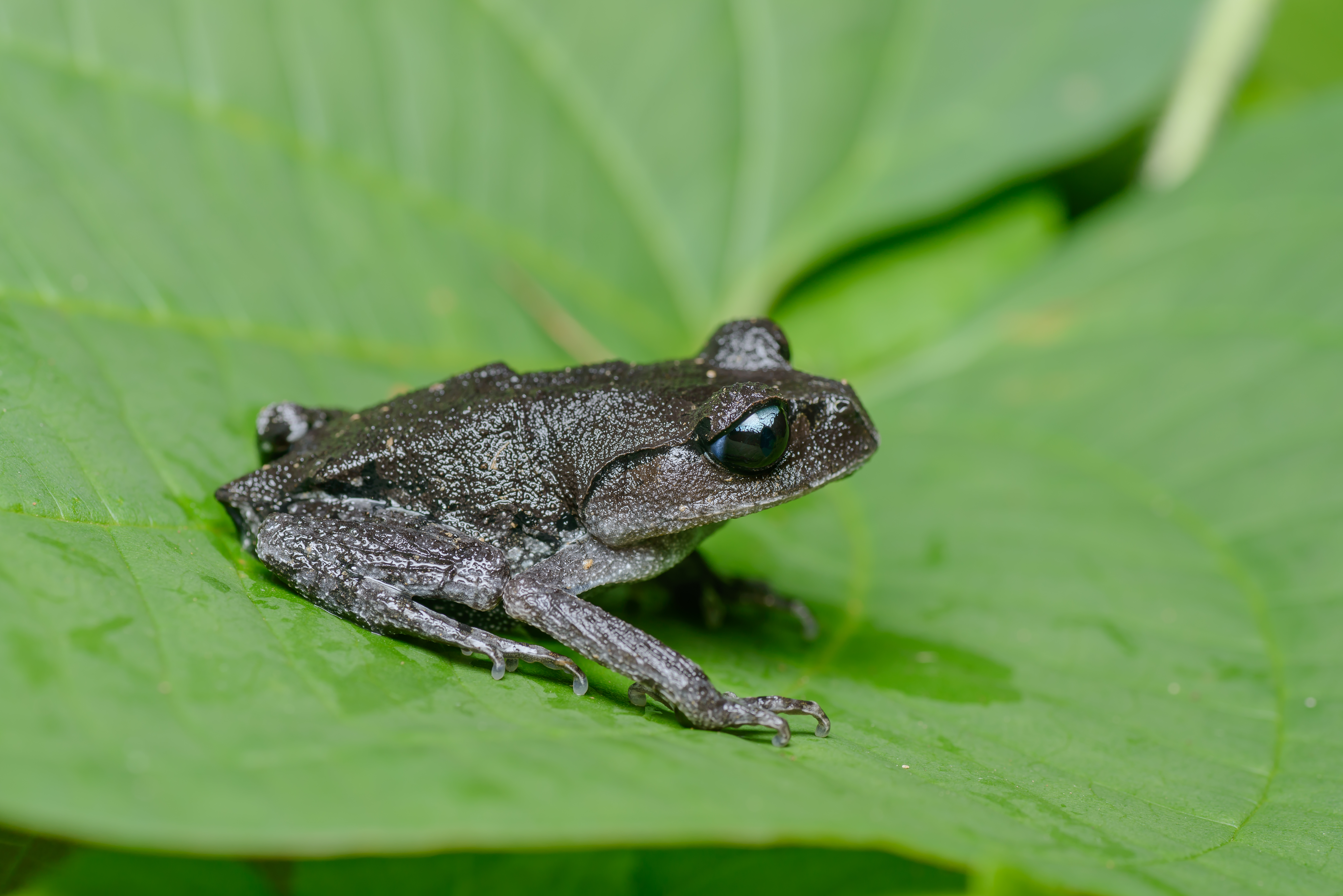

Conservation status
- Least Concern (IUCN 3.1)

Scientific classification
- Kingdom: Animalia
- Phylum: Chordata
- Class: Amphibia
- Order: Anura
- Family: Megophryidae
- Genus: Leptobrachium
- Species: L. chapaense

Binomial name
- Leptobrachium chapaense (Bourret, 1937)

Synonyms
- Megophrys hasselti ssp. chapaensis Bourret, 1937

= Leptobrachium chapaense =

Species of amphibian

Leptobrachium chapaense is a species of amphibian in the family Megophryidae. It is found in China, Laos, Thailand, Vietnam, and possibly Myanmar. Its natural habitats are subtropical or tropical moist lowland forests, subtropical or tropical moist montane forests, and rivers. It is threatened by habitat loss.
