= Leptobrachium leishanense =

Conservation status
- Endangered (IUCN 3.1)

Scientific classification
- Kingdom: Animalia
- Phylum: Chordata
- Class: Amphibia
- Order: Anura
- Family: Megophryidae
- Genus: Leptobrachium
- Species: L. leishanense

Binomial name
- Leptobrachium leishanense (Liu & Hu, 1973)

Synonyms
- Vibrissaphora leishanensis Liu & Hu, 1973

Species of frog

Leptobrachium leishanense, the Leishan spiny toad or Leishan moustache toad, is a species of frog in the family Megophryidae. It is endemic to China: it is only known from the vicinity of its type locality in Leishan County in Guizhou. Its natural habitats are moist lowland forests, moist montane forests, and rivers. It is threatened by habitat loss and overexploitation.
