= Cnemaspis muria =

Scientific classification
- Kingdom: Animalia
- Phylum: Chordata
- Class: Reptilia
- Order: Squamata
- Suborder: Gekkota
- Family: Gekkonidae
- Genus: Cnemaspis
- Species: C. muria

Binomial name
- Cnemaspis muria Riyanto, Munir, Martamenggala, Fitriana, & Hamidy, 2019

Species of lizard

Cnemaspis muria, the Muria rock gecko (Indonesian: Cicak Batu Gunung Muria), is a species of diurnal, rock-dwelling, insectivorous gecko endemic to Indonesia. It is distributed throughout Java. It was first identified by Riyanto et al (2019) on the southern slopes of Gunung Muria, a dormant volcano in central Java. To date, this is the only known location for the genus Cnemaspis on the island of Java. This discovery is geographically significant as the closest other species of Cnemaspis (C. rajabasa) was found in Lampung, roughly 580 km away. The holotype was caught at night and subsequent species were only found on large rocky microhabitats alongside rivers and coffee plantations. As it is an insectivore, it is believed to eat pests found on coffee plants; there are concerns about the use of insecticides jeopardizing the geckos as natural pest control agents.

In the initial reporting, only a single female was identified; however the species appears to be sexually dimorphic in regards to the ventral color pattern. The males identified have a yellow belly, compared to the white belly of the female. The ventral surface of the tail is yellow and white in males whereas the female's tail has alternating black and white rings bands which completely encircle the tail.
