= Leptobrachium masatakasatoi =

Scientific classification
- Kingdom: Animalia
- Phylum: Chordata
- Class: Amphibia
- Order: Anura
- Family: Megophryidae
- Genus: Leptobrachium
- Species: L. masatakasatoi

Binomial name
- Leptobrachium masatakasatoi Matsui, 2013

Species of frog

Leptobrachium masatakasatoi is a species of frog in the family Megophryidae. It is known from its type locality, Phu Pan in Houaphanh Province in northeastern Laos, and from Sơn La Province in northwestern Vietnam. The specific name masatakasatoi honors professor Masataka Sato, Japanese entomologist who collected the holotype. Common name Masatakasato's eyebrow toad has been proposed for this frog.

== Description ==
Adult males measure 53–59 mm (2.1–2.3 in) and adult females 55–68 mm (2.2–2.7 in) in snout–vent length. The body is robust. The head is broad and depressed, and the snout is broadly rounded. The tympanum is indistinct. The finger and toe tips are rounded and slightly swollen. The fingers have no webbing whereas the toes have some poorly defined webbing. The dorsum is light brown or brown-reddish and has irregularly black spots; some individuals also have distinct dark spots on medial side of the upper eyelid. The supratympanic fold is edged in black below. The flanks are light brown and re reticulated with large black spots. The ventral surface has irregular brown and cream markings.

== Habitat and conservation ==
Leptobrachium masatakasatoi is known from an altitude of 1,750 m (5,740 ft) above sea level in Laos (no habitat data available), and from along small streams and on forest paths in evergreen forest at elevations between 1,000 and 1,670 m (3,280 and 5,480 ft). As of mid-2020, it has not been assessed for the IUCN Red List of Threatened Species.
