= V. echinata =

V. echinata may refer to:

- Vermicularia echinata, a plant pathogen
- Vibrissaphora echinata, a Vietnamese amphibian
