= Brachytarsophrys popei =

Scientific classification
- Kingdom: Animalia
- Phylum: Chordata
- Class: Amphibia
- Order: Anura
- Family: Megophryidae
- Genus: Brachytarsophrys
- Species: B. popei

Binomial name
- Brachytarsophrys popei Zhao, Yang, Chen, Chen, & Wang, 2014

Species of frog

Brachytarsophrys popei is a species of frog in the family Megophryidae. It is found in southern China.

== Range ==
Brachytarsophrys popei was found in:

- Mount Jinggang, Jiangxi Province
- Taoyuandong Nature Reserve, Hunan Province
- Yizhang County, Hunan Province
- Nanling Nature Reserve, Guangdong Province
