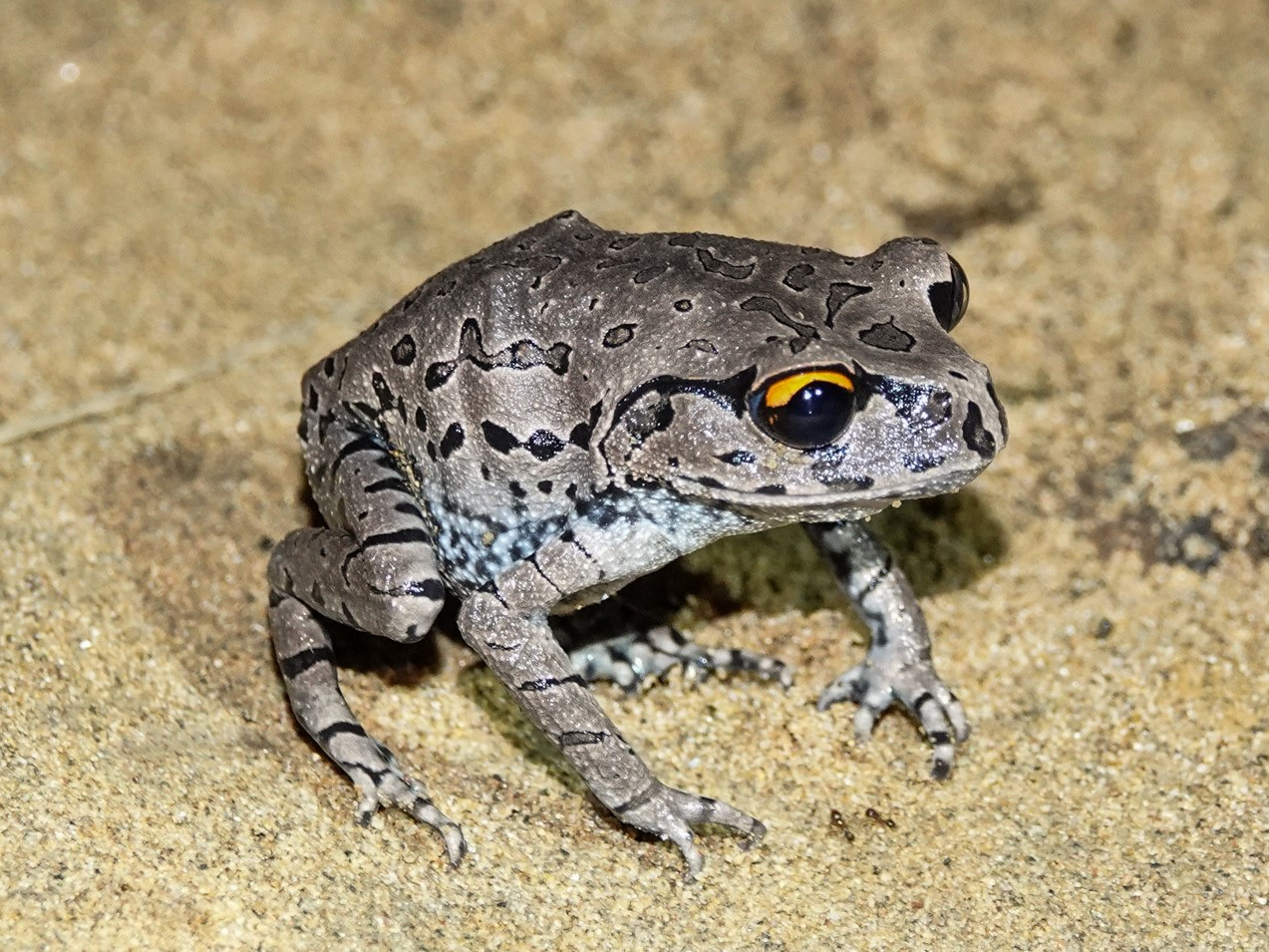

Conservation status
- Endangered (IUCN 3.1)

Scientific classification
- Kingdom: Animalia
- Phylum: Chordata
- Class: Amphibia
- Order: Anura
- Family: Megophryidae
- Genus: Leptobrachium
- Species: L. rakhinense

Binomial name
- Leptobrachium rakhinense Wogan, 2012

Synonyms
- Leptobrachium rakhinensis Wogan, 2012; Leptobrachium rakhinense – correction in gender

= Leptobrachium rakhinense =

Species of frog

Leptobrachium rakhinense is a species of frog in the family Megophryidae. Originally described from the eponymous Rakhine Mountains in Myanmar, it is now understood as also being present in Bangladesh and north-eastern India.

== Description ==
Adult males measure 48–57 mm (1.9–2.2 in) and adult females 58–66 mm (2.3–2.6 in) in snout–vent length. The body is robust. The snout is rounded. The tympanum is hidden and indistinct while the supratympanic fold is distinct. The forelimbs are slender. The fingers have weak dermal fringes. The toes have thick webbing and extensive dermal fringing reaching to their tips. Dorsal coloration consists of a light gray background and dark gray spots. The iris is bicolored with red upper half and black lower half.

== Habitat and conservation ==
In Myanmar, Leptobrachium rakhinense occurs in primary evergreen rain forest on low-lying mountains at elevations of 600–900 m (2,000–3,000 ft) above sea level. The holotype was found on the forest floor. Males have been observed calling from the ground in leaf litter in September, in the end of the monsoon season, and females collected at the same time were gravid. Natural enemies of this frog include Scolopendra centipedes.

This species is likely affected by habitat degradation associated with shifting agriculture and logging. It is known from Rakhine Yoma Elephant Range.
