= Leptobrachium buchardi =

Conservation status
- Endangered (IUCN 3.1)

Scientific classification
- Kingdom: Animalia
- Phylum: Chordata
- Class: Amphibia
- Order: Anura
- Family: Megophryidae
- Genus: Leptobrachium
- Species: L. buchardi

Binomial name
- Leptobrachium buchardi Ohler, Teynié & David, 2004

Species of amphibian

Leptobrachium buchardi is a species of amphibian in the family Megophryidae. It is endemic to Laos and only known from the Bolaven Plateau in the Champasak Province, near its type locality within the Dong Hua Sao National Protected Area. Its natural habitat is subtropical or tropical moist montane forests. It is threatened by habitat loss.

Male Leptobrachium buchardi measure 45.1–48.0 mm (1.78–1.89 in) and female 49.2–56.5 mm (1.94–2.22 in) in snout–vent length.
