= Leptobrachium guangxiense =

Scientific classification
- Kingdom: Animalia
- Phylum: Chordata
- Class: Amphibia
- Order: Anura
- Family: Megophryidae
- Genus: Leptobrachium
- Species: L. guangxiense

Binomial name
- Leptobrachium guangxiense Fei, Mo, Ye, and Jiang, 2009

Species of frog

Leptobrachium guangxiense is a species of frog in the family Megophryidae from China and Vietnam. It has been recorded in Pinglong'ao (平隆), Shangsi County, Guangxi, China, and in Tam Dao National Park, Vietnam.
