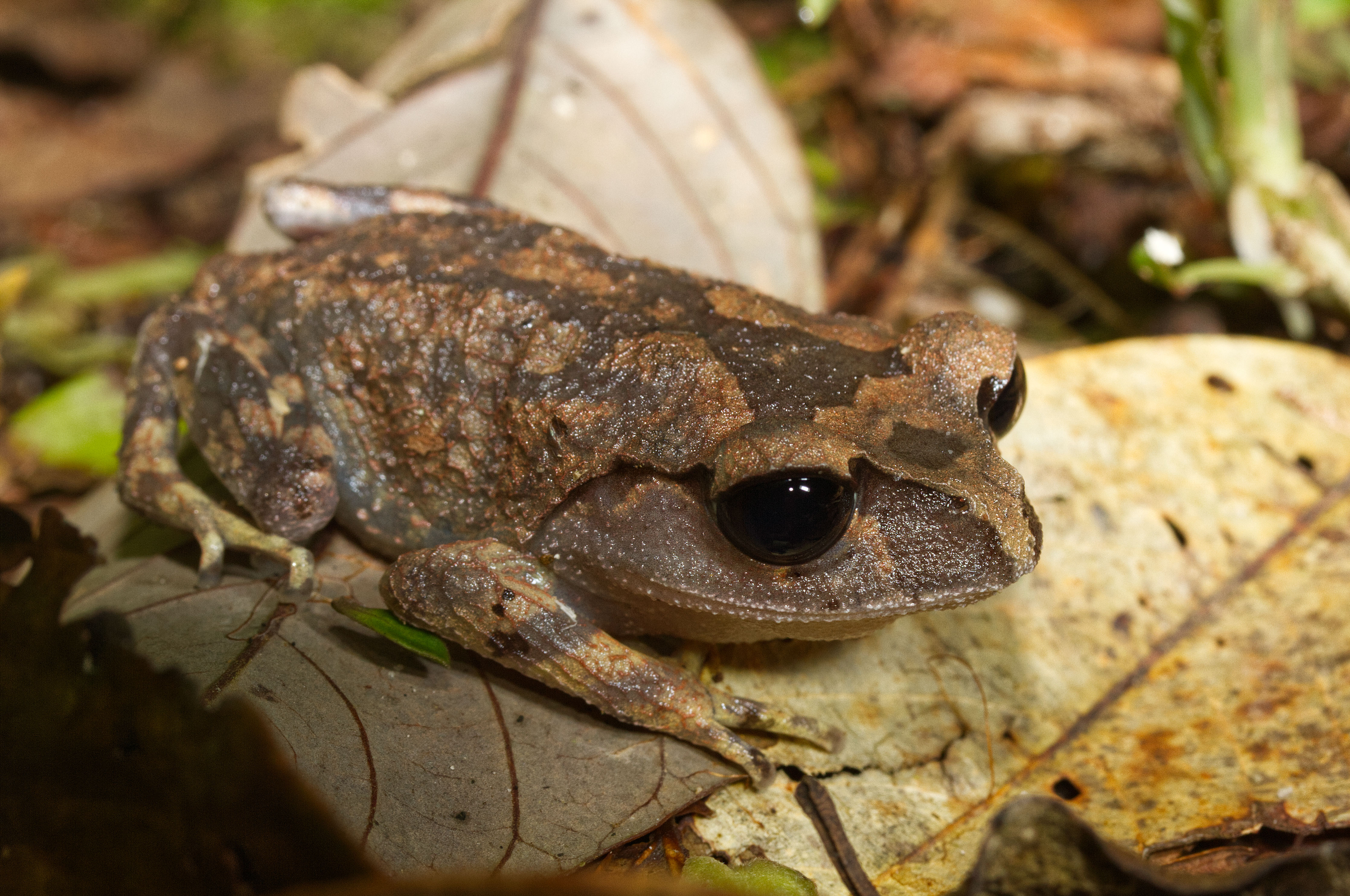
- Leptobatrachum abbotti in Kinabalu Park

Conservation status
- Least Concern (IUCN 3.1)

Scientific classification
- Kingdom: Animalia
- Phylum: Chordata
- Class: Amphibia
- Order: Anura
- Family: Megophryidae
- Genus: Leptobrachium
- Species: L. abbotti

Binomial name
- Leptobrachium abbotti (Cochran, 1926)

= Leptobrachium abbotti =

Species of amphibian

Leptobrachium abbotti, or Lowland Litter Frog, is a species of amphibian in the family Megophryidae. It is found in Brunei, Indonesia, and Malaysia. Its natural habitats are subtropical or tropical moist lowland forests and rivers. It is threatened by habitat loss.

== Description ==
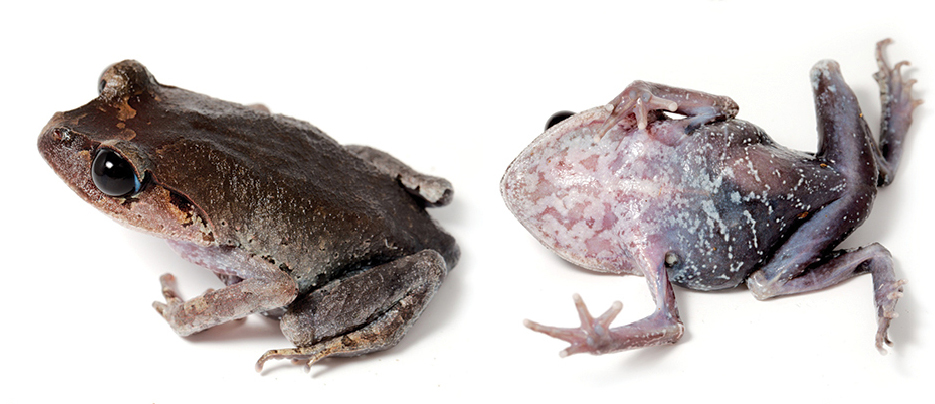

A stocky, frog with a broad head, large eyes, short, slender legs and feet without webbing. Males reach 75 mm with females up to 95 mm. Head, back, and sides are brown or black while the belly is marked with white and black mottling. Individuals from Sarawak may have a gray or white belly without markings.

Tadpoles can reach a length of 75-90 mm by metamorphosis. Tadpoles are pale brown or straw-colored initially, but gradually darken to a medium brown. Over time, the tadpoles develop black spots on their tails and bodies (Inger and Stuebing 1997), with a black spot always present at the junction of the trunk and tail.
