= Leptobrachium hainanense =

Conservation status
- Vulnerable (IUCN 3.1)

Scientific classification
- Kingdom: Animalia
- Phylum: Chordata
- Class: Amphibia
- Order: Anura
- Family: Megophryidae
- Genus: Leptobrachium
- Species: L. hainanense

Binomial name
- Leptobrachium hainanense Ye & Fei, 1993

Species of amphibian

Leptobrachium hainanense, the Hainan pseudomoustache toad, is a species of amphibian in the family Megophryidae. It is endemic to the mountains of central and southwestern Hainan Island, China. Before being recognized as a separate species, it was confused with Leptobrachium hasseltii.

Leptobrachium hainanense is an uncommon species inhabiting evergreen broadleaf forests and breeding in hill streams. It is threatened by habitat loss and degradation, and is also locally collected for food. Males grow to snout-vent length of about 52 mm (2.0 in). Tadpoles are about 67 mm (2.6 in) in length.
