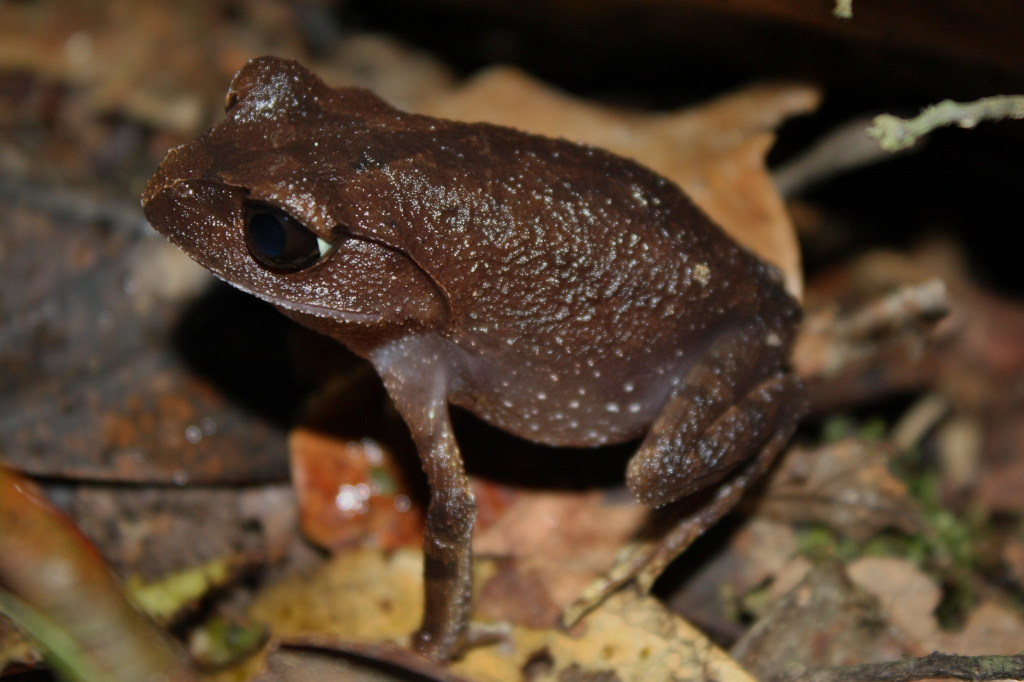

Conservation status
- Least Concern (IUCN 3.1)

Scientific classification
- Kingdom: Animalia
- Phylum: Chordata
- Class: Amphibia
- Order: Anura
- Family: Megophryidae
- Genus: Leptobrachium
- Subgenus: Leptobrachium
- Species: L. montanum

Binomial name
- Leptobrachium montanum Fischer, 1885

= Leptobrachium montanum =

Species of frog

Leptobrachium montanum is a species of frog from the family Megophryidae. It is endemic to Borneo and is, as currently defined, found in Kalimantan (Indonesia), Sabah and Sarawak (Malaysia), and Labi, Belait (Brunei). However, the nominal Leptobrachium montanum is a composed of more than one lineage. Available information mostly refers to this composite rather than the "true" Leptobrachium montanum. Common names montane large-eyed litter frog, mountain spadefoot toad, and mountain litter frog have been coined for it.

== Description ==
The holotype of Leptobrachium montanum is an adult female measuring 63 mm (2.5 in) in snout–vent length (SVL). Two adult males and four females representing "Leptobrachium montanum lineage 1" measure 56–57 mm (2.2–2.2 in) and females 49–72 mm (1.9–2.8 in) SVL, respectively. This lineage from southeastern Kalimantan is believed to represent the "true" Leptobrachium montanum. The dorsum is brown above, mimicking dead leaves. The head is broad. The eyes are big.

male advertisement call is a loud "quak".

The tadpoles are large and possess a strong tail with well-developed tail fin. They reach a total length of 70 mm (2.8 in) or even more.

== Habitat and conservation ==
Its natural habitats are submontane and montane forests at elevations of 900–1,800 m (3,000–5,900 ft) above sea level. While adults and juveniles can roam widely through forests, breeding takes place in small to medium-sized mountain streams with rocky stream bed. The tadpoles prefer quiet stream sections.

Leptobrachium montanum is threatened by habitat loss and fragmentation. It occurs in many protected areas.
