= Leptobrachium ailaonicum =

Conservation status
- Least Concern (IUCN 3.1)

Scientific classification
- Kingdom: Animalia
- Phylum: Chordata
- Class: Amphibia
- Order: Anura
- Family: Megophryidae
- Genus: Leptobrachium
- Species: L. ailaonicum

Binomial name
- Leptobrachium ailaonicum (Yang, Chen and Ma, 1983)

Synonyms
- Vibrissaphora ailaonica Yang, Chen, and Ma, 1983; Leptobrachium (Vibrissaphora) echinatum Dubois and Ohler, 1998

Species of amphibian

Leptobrachium ailaonicum (variously known as the Ailao spiny toad, Ailao moustache toad, or Yunnan moustache toad) is a species of amphibian in the family Megophryidae. It is found in Yunnan in southern China and on Fansipan mountain in northern Vietnam. Its type locality is Xujiaba in the Ailao Mountains in Jingdong County, Yunnan. At the time of the IUCN assessment in 2004, the population on Fansipan was considered a separate species, Leptobrachium (Vibrissaphora) echinatum, and assessed to be an endangered species.

The natural habitats of Leptobrachium ailaonicum are tropical moist lowland forests and rivers. It is threatened by habitat loss.
