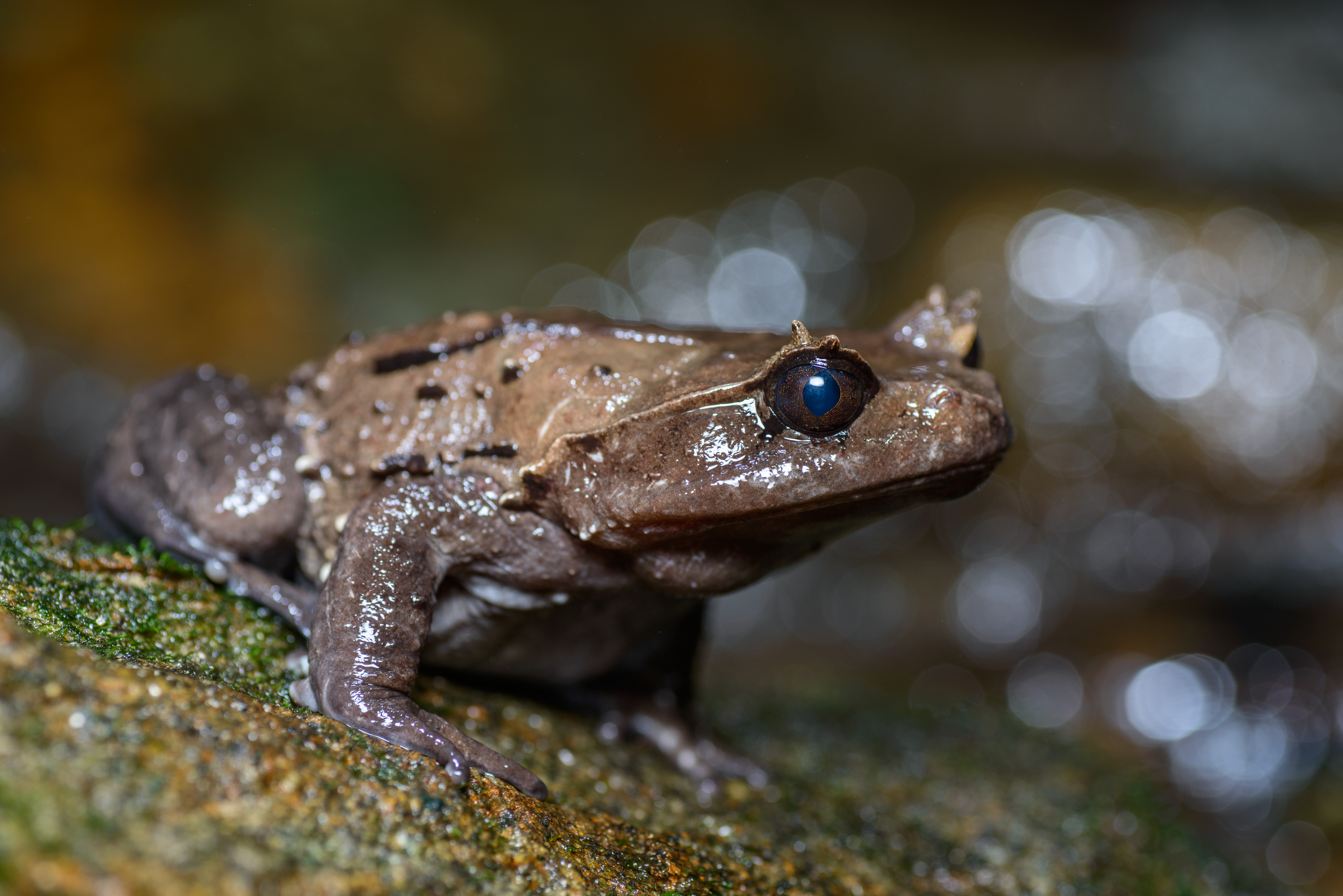
- Brachytarsophrys carinense

Scientific classification
- Kingdom: Animalia
- Phylum: Chordata
- Class: Amphibia
- Order: Anura
- Family: Megophryidae
- Genus: Brachytarsophrys; Tian & Hu, 1983

Type species
- Leptobrachium carinensis Boulenger, 1899

Species
- See text

= Brachytarsophrys =

Genus of amphibians

Brachytarsophrys is a genus of the family Megophryidae in the order Anura, and are found in southern China, Myanmar, northern Thailand and northern Vietnam. Common names include short-legged toad.

Natural history of Brachytarsophrys is poorly known. Males of at least some species (Brachytarsophrys feae, Brachytarsophrys carinense) are territorial and may be aggressive. The advertisement call of Brachytarsophrys feae has been likened to barking.

== Species ==
There are seven species in the genus, with more likely to be described in the future. The genus can be divided into two groups: the Brachytarsophrys carinense group and Brachytarsophrys feae group. The B. carinense group is characterized by the presence of a dermal ridge or glandular fold on dorsum and their larger size, while the B. feae group does not have any ridges or folds on the dorsum and has both smaller and larger species.

=== Brachytarsophrys carinense group ===
- Brachytarsophrys carinense (Boulenger, 1889)
- Brachytarsophrys intermedia (Smith, 1921)

=== Brachytarsophrys feae group ===
- Brachytarsophrys chuannanensis (Fei, Ye & Huang, 2001)
- Brachytarsophrys feae (Boulenger, 1887)
- Brachytarsophrys orientalis (Y. Li, Lyu, J. Wang & Y.Y. Wang, 2020)
- Brachytarsophrys platyparietus (Rao & Yang, 1997)
- Brachytarsophrys popei (Zhao, Yang, Chen, Chen, & Wang, 2014)
- Brachytarsophrys wui (Lyu et al., 2026)

IUCN also lists a seventh species, Brachytarsophrys platyparietus, but this is considered to be a synonym of Brachytarsophrys carinense. However, a 2020 study recovered it as a distinct species.
