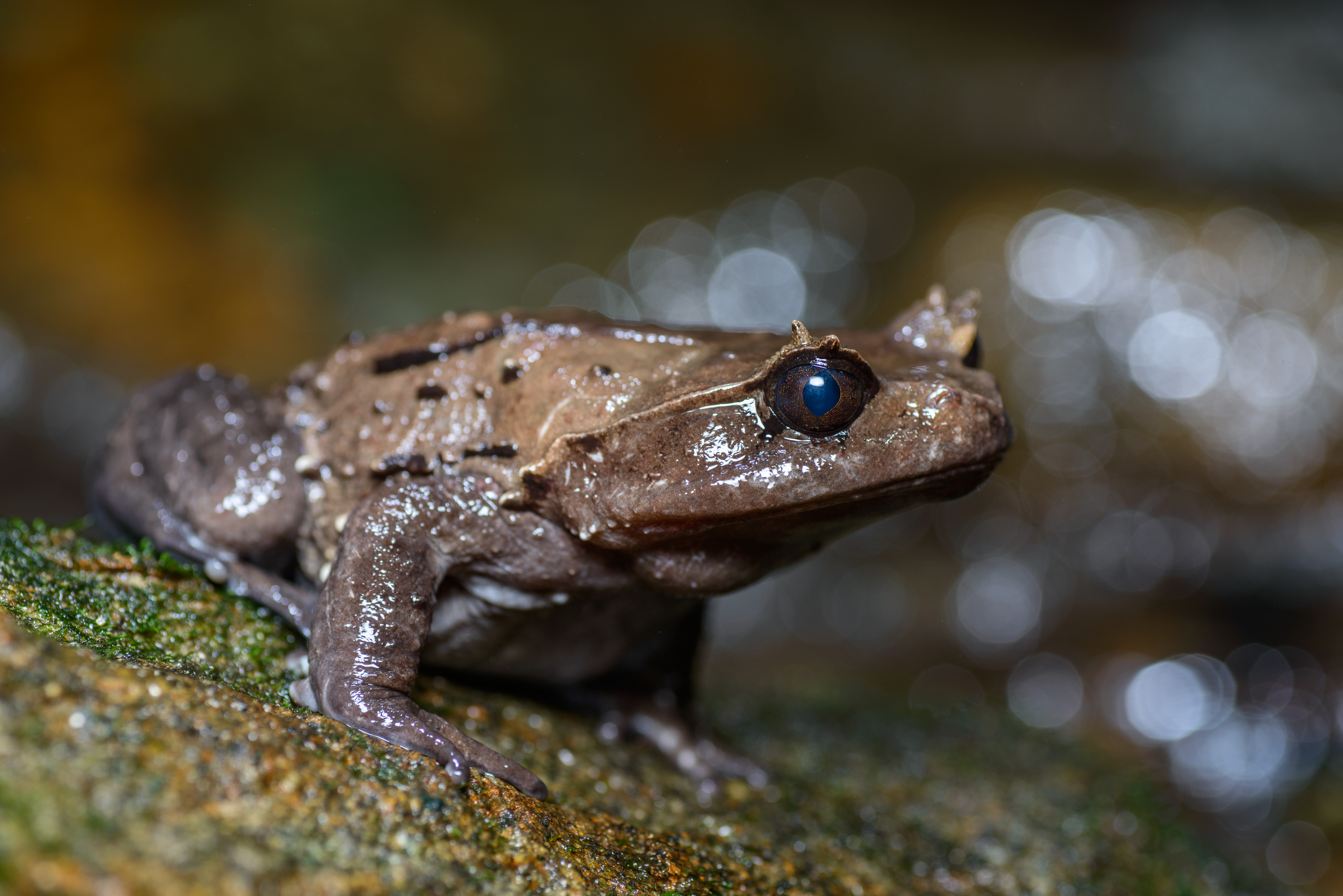

Conservation status
- Least Concern (IUCN 3.1)

Scientific classification
- Kingdom: Animalia
- Phylum: Chordata
- Class: Amphibia
- Order: Anura
- Family: Megophryidae
- Genus: Brachytarsophrys
- Species: B. carinense

Binomial name
- Brachytarsophrys carinense (Boulenger, 1889)

Synonyms
- Brachytarsophrys carinensis Boulenger, 1889; Brachytarsophrys platyparietus Rao and Yang, 1997; Leptobrachium carinense Boulenger, 1889; Megophrys carinense (Boulenger, 1889)

= Brachytarsophrys carinense =

Species of frog

Brachytarsophrys carinense (common names: Burmese horned toad, Karin Hills frog, and many others) is a species of frog in the family Megophryidae. It is now understood to include Brachytarsophrys platyparietus of China. Defined this way, its distribution area includes southern Myanmar and the adjacent Thailand and southern China.

In Thailand, it is found in Doi Suthep–Pui National Park, Chiang Mai Province and in Khao Nan National Park, Nakhon Si Thammarat Province.

== Taxonomy ==
Brachytarsophrys platyparietus Rao & Yang, 1997 is now considered a synonym of Brachytarsophrys carinense. This taxon represented the Chinese component of the present B. carinense. In 2004 the International Union for Conservation of Nature assessed Brachytarsophrys platyparietus to be of "Least concern."

== Description ==
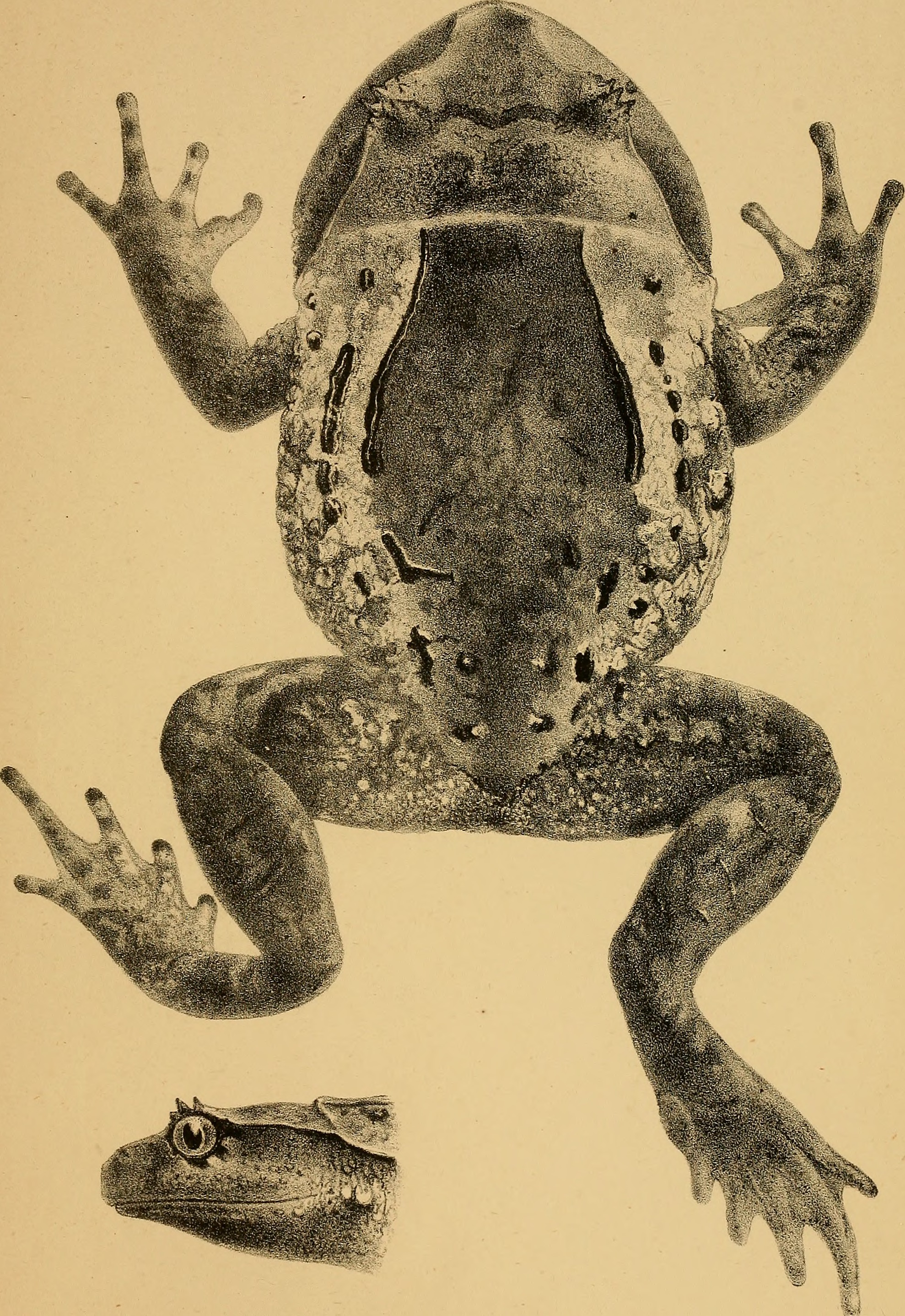

Brachytarsophrys carinense are large frogs, particularly females: males grow to about 89 mm (3.5 in) and females to about 137 mm (5.4 in) in snout-vent length. Tadpoles are small in comparison, up to 42 mm (1.7 in) in length.

== Habitat and conservation ==
Brachytarsophrys carinense are associated with forest streams where their larvae develop. In China it is common where it occurs, whereas in Myanmar and Thailand it is considered to be uncommon to rare.

The species is widespread and there are no major threats, but it is potentially threatened by habitat loss. In China it is collected for local consumption, but at present this is not a major threat.

== Behavior ==
When disturbed, it produces a distress call that is a loud scream lasting 6 to 10 seconds long.
