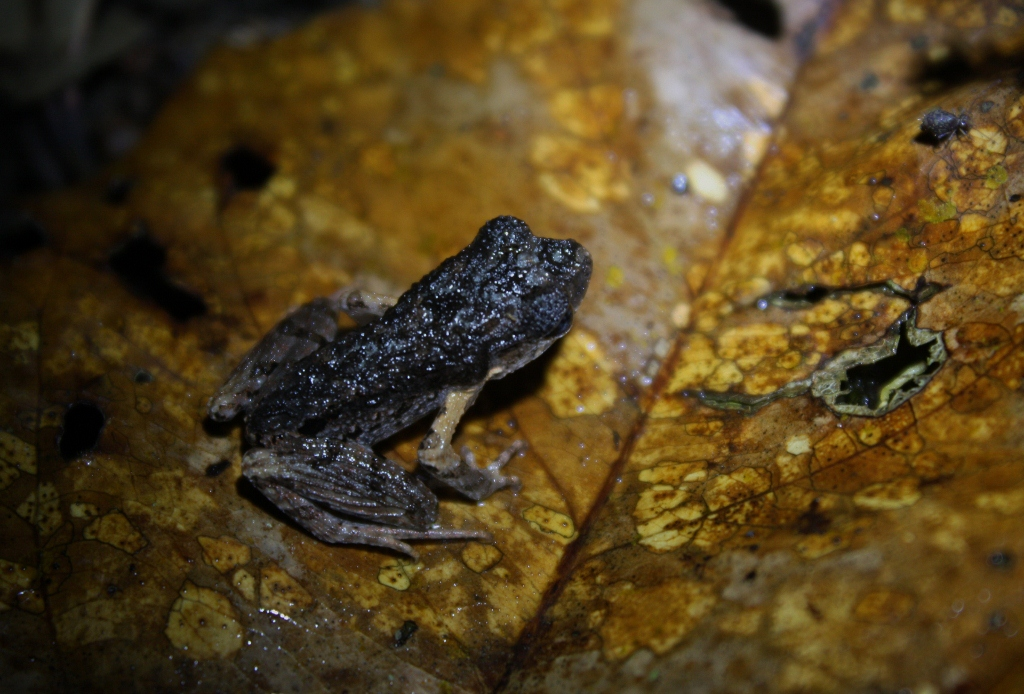

Conservation status
- Least Concern (IUCN 3.1)

Scientific classification
- Kingdom: Animalia
- Phylum: Chordata
- Class: Amphibia
- Order: Anura
- Family: Megophryidae
- Genus: Leptobrachium
- Species: L. hendricksoni

Binomial name
- Leptobrachium hendricksoni Taylor, 1962

= Leptobrachium hendricksoni =

Species of amphibian

Leptobrachium hendricksoni (common names: Thai spadefoot toad, bright yellow-eyed crawl frog, spotted litter frog) is a species of amphibian in the family Megophryidae. It is found in Malay Peninsula (Southern Thailand and Peninsular Malaysia), Sarawak (Borneo), and Sumatra (Indonesia). Its natural habitats are tropical moist lowland forests, rivers, freshwater marshes, and nearby plantations and heavily degraded former forests. It is threatened by habitat loss.

Male Leptobrachium hendricksoni grow to snout-vent length of 39–48 mm (1.5–1.9 in) and females to 52–80 mm (2.0–3.1 in).
