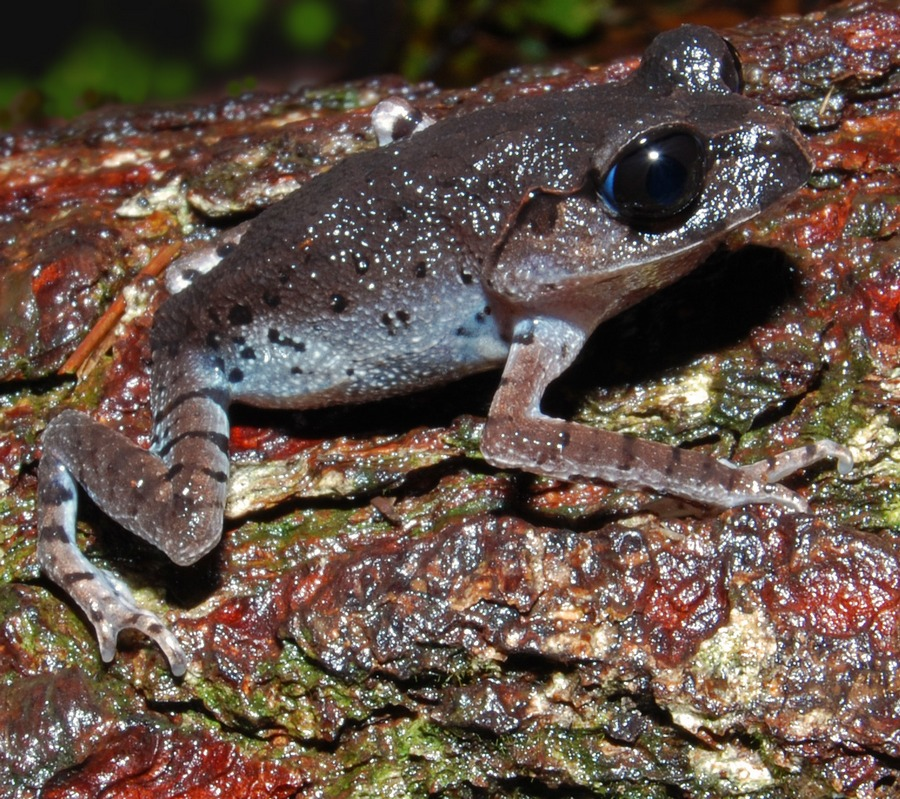
- Male Leptobrachium hasseltii from Bogor, Java

Conservation status
- Least Concern (IUCN 3.1)

Scientific classification
- Kingdom: Animalia
- Phylum: Chordata
- Class: Amphibia
- Order: Anura
- Family: Megophryidae
- Genus: Leptobrachium
- Species: L. hasseltii

Binomial name
- Leptobrachium hasseltii Tschudi, 1838

Synonyms
- Megophrys hasseltii (Tschudi, 1838)

= Leptobrachium hasseltii =

Species of amphibian

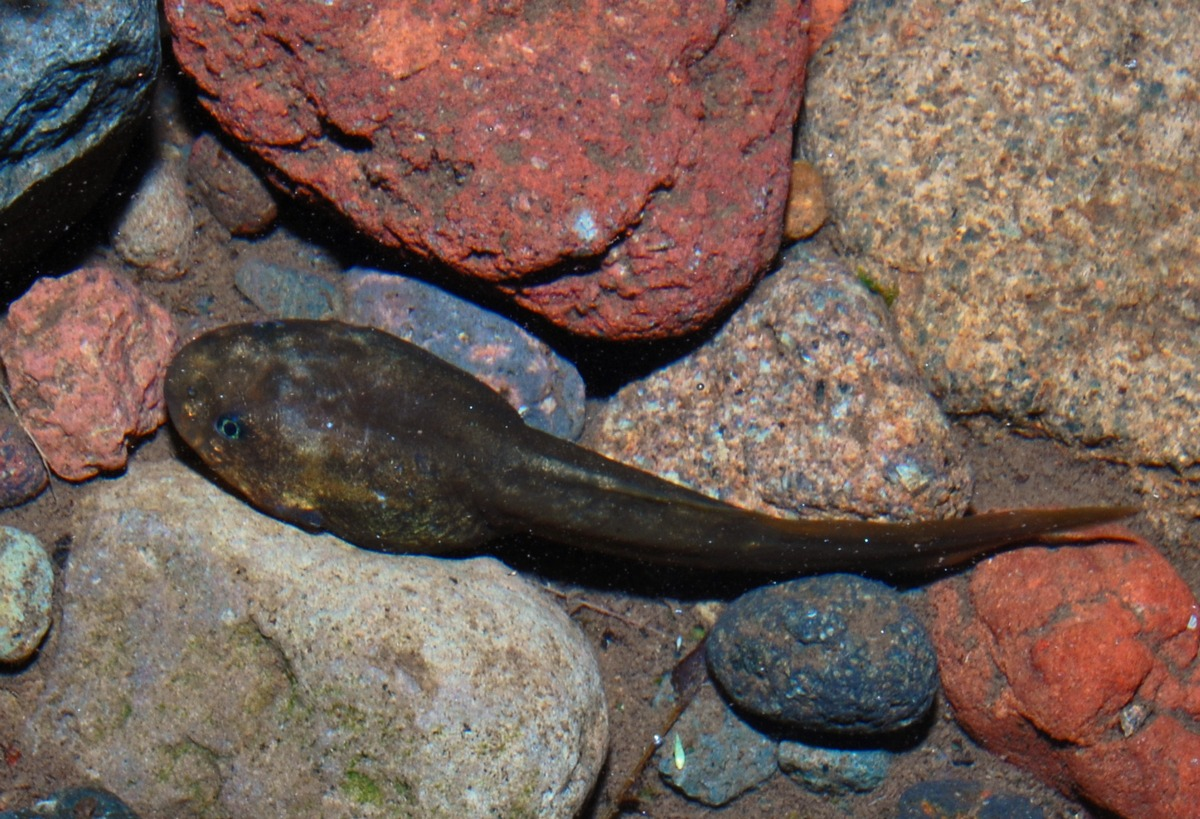
Tadpole

Leptobrachium hasseltii (Hasselt's toad, Java spadefoot toad, Hasselt's litter frog, Tschudi's frog) is a species of toad found in Southeast Asia. This frog named after Dutch Naturalist Johan Conrad van Hasselt. According to the current understanding, this species is known with certainty only from Java (also the type locality), Madura, Bali, and Kangean Islands, Indonesia. The species is also commonly reported to occur in the Philippines (Palawan, Mindoro, Bohol, Basilan, Mindanao islands), but these are believed to refer to another, unnamed species.

As Leptobrachium hasseltii is the type species of genus Leptobrachium, populations from many areas were first referred to as conforming with this species, only to be later recognized as separate species. This applies, for example, to Leptobrachium hainanense from Hainan and Leptobrachium liui from the mainland China, and Leptobrachium smithi from Thailand and Burma.

== Description and habitat ==
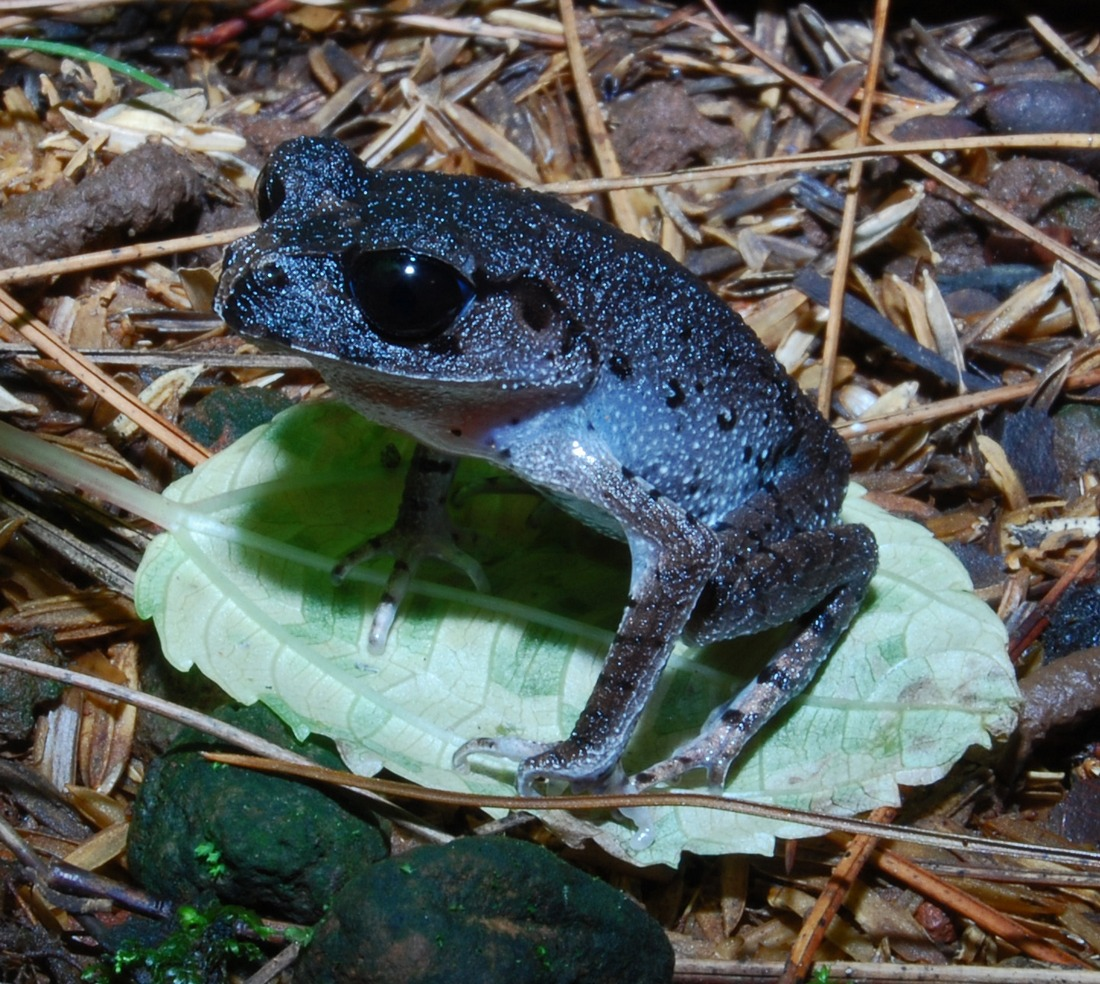

Leptobrachium hasseltii has a large head that is wider than the body and with large eyes with a scarlet coloured iris, tips of digits round and webbed at the base, and smooth skin. Adults are dark above, patterned with darker circles, with a white ventral surface with black blotches. Juveniles are bluish in color. Females are larger (70 mm (2.8 in) snout-vent length) than males (60 mm (2.4 in) SVL).

Leptobrachium hasseltii inhabits the forest floor litter of montane and lowland rainforests. Tadpoles live in quiet pools and ponds. The species is threatened by deforestation.
