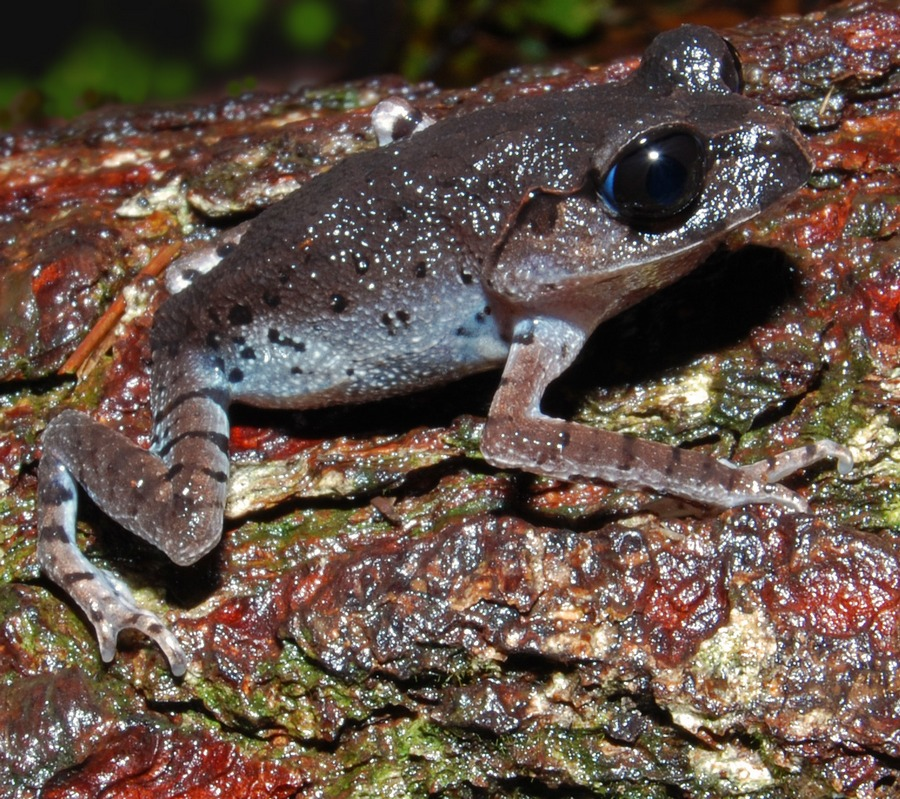
- Leptobrachium hasseltii

Scientific classification
- Kingdom: Animalia
- Phylum: Chordata
- Class: Amphibia
- Order: Anura
- Family: Megophryidae
- Genus: Leptobrachium; Tschudi, 1838

Type species
- Leptobrachium hasseltii Tschudi, 1838

Species
- About 35, see text.

= Eastern spadefoot toad =

Eastern spadefoot toads

Genus of amphibians

Eastern spadefoot toads (Leptobrachium, also known as large-eyed litter frogs) comprise a genus of the family Megophryidae in the order Anura, and are found in southern China, northeast India, southeast Asia, and islands of the Sunda Shelf as well as the Philippines. They are characterized by a stocky body with slender, short hindlimbs. In identifying species, iris colour is a valuable diagnostic morphological characteristic (see Leptobrachium bompu for an example of a blue-eyed species); the iris has uniform colour in some species, whereas in other species the upper half is coloured and the lower half is dark.

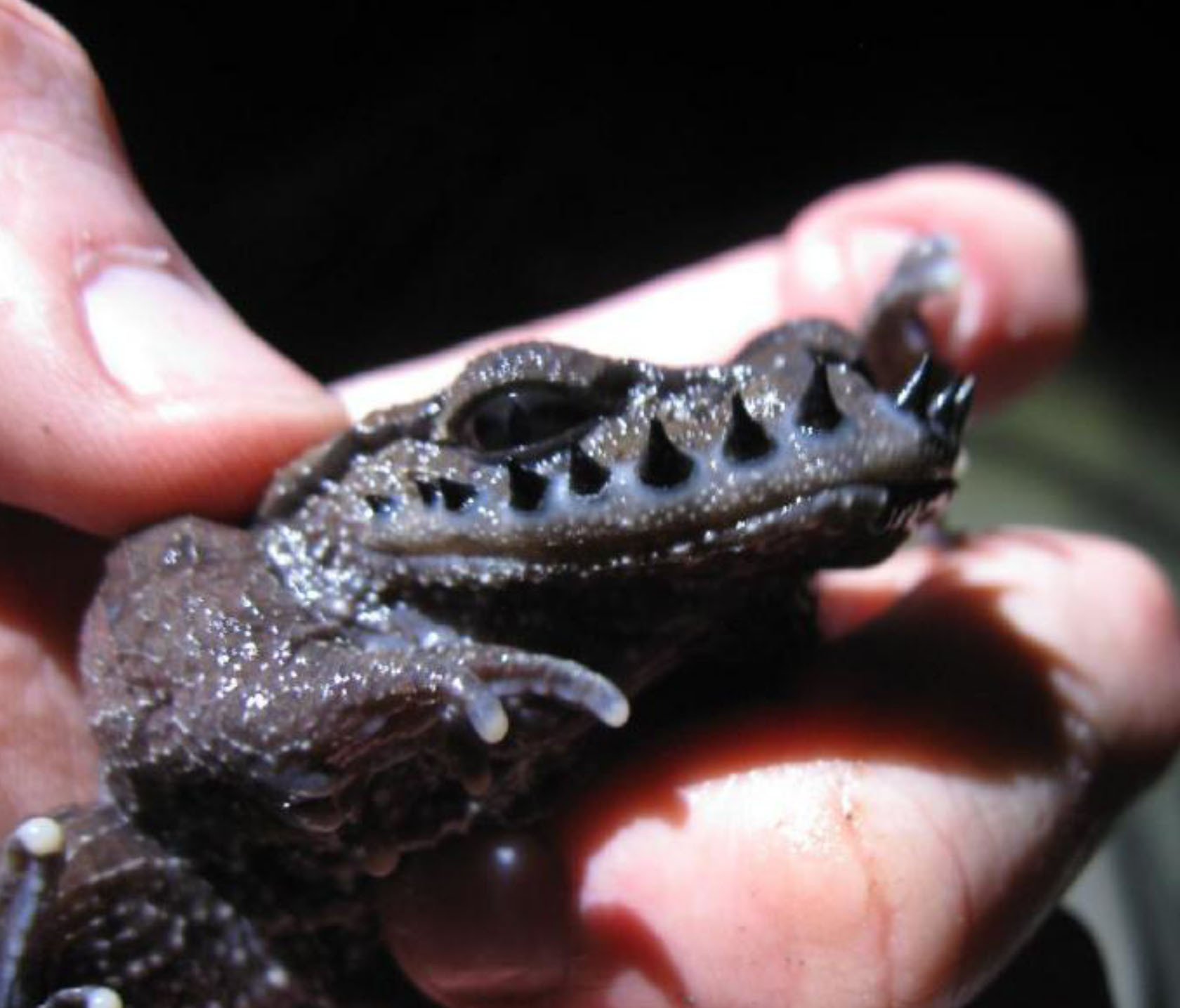
Leptobrachium boringii male at the height of the breeding season. Nuptial spines are clearly visible. This character has been used to define subgenus Vibrissaphora.

The sister taxon of Leptobrachium is a clade that includes Scutiger and Oreolalax.

== Subgenera ==
Two subgenera, Leptobrachium and Vibrissaphora, are recognized; the latter was originally described as a genus, with Vibrissaphora boringii as the type species. These subgenera (or genera) were originally separated by presence (in Vibrissaphora, hence the common name moustache or spiny toad) and absence of nuptial spines on the upper labium in males during the breeding season (in Leptobrachium). Later genetic analyses have not supported this original separation, but still indicate the presence of two distinct clades. These clades can be referred to as subgenera Leptobrachium and Vibrissaphora, but their contents differ from the earlier, purely morphological definition (Vibrissaphora contains all spiny species, but also non-spiny ones). Subgenus Vibrissaphora thus defined is distributed in southern China and Indochina, and subgenus Leptobrachium in the Malay Peninsula and the Malay Archipelago northwest of the Wallace Line. No morphological character that could uniquely separate the subgenera has yet been identified.

== Species ==
As of mid-2019, there were 36 recognized species: and one proposed species

- Leptobrachium abbotti (Cochran, 1926)
- Leptobrachium ailaonicum (Yang, Chen, and Ma, 1983)
- Leptobrachium aryatium Purkayastha et al., 2025
- Leptobrachium banae Lathrop, Murphy, Orlov & Ho, 1998
- Leptobrachium bompu Sondhi & Orlov, 2011
- Leptobrachium boringii (Liu, 1945)
- Leptobrachium buchardi Ohler, Teynié & David, 2004
- Leptobrachium chapaense (Bourret, 1937)
- Leptobrachium guangxiense Fei, Mo, Ye & Jiang, 2009
- Leptobrachium gunungense Malkmus, 1996
- Leptobrachium hainanense Ye & Fei In Ye, Fei & Hu, 1993
- Leptobrachium hasseltii Tschudi, 1838
- Leptobrachium hendricksoni Taylor, 1962
- Leptobrachium huashen Fei and Ye, 2005
- Leptobrachium ingeri Hamidy, Matsui, Nishikawa, and Belabut, 2012
- Leptobrachium kanowitense Hamidy, Matsui, Nishikawa, and Belabut, 2012
- Leptobrachium kantonishikawai Hamidy and Matsui, 2014
- Leptobrachium leishanense (Liu and Hu, 1973)
- Leptobrachium leucops Stuart, Rowley, Tran, Le & Hoang, 2011
- Leptobrachium liui (Pope, 1947)
- Leptobrachium lumadorum Brown, Siler, Diesmos & Alcala, 2010
- Leptobrachium mangyanorum Brown, Siler, Diesmos & Alcala, 2010
- Leptobrachium masatakasatoi Matsui, 2013
- Leptobrachium montanum Fischer, 1885
- Leptobrachium mouhoti Stuart, Sok & Neang, 2006
- Leptobrachium ngoclinhense Orlov, 2005
- Leptobrachium nigrops Berry & Hendrickson, 1963
- Leptobrachium promustache (Rao, Wilkinson, and Zhang, 2006)
- Leptobrachium pullum (Smith, 1921)
- Leptobrachium rakhinensis Wogan, 2012
- Leptobrachium smithi Matsui, Nabhitabhata & Panha, 1999
- Leptobrachium sylheticum Al-Razi, Maria, and Poyarkov, 2021
- Leptobrachium tagbanorum Brown, Siler, Diesmos & Alcala, 2010
- Leptobrachium tenasserimense Pawangkhanant, Poyarkov, Duong, Naiduangchan, and Suwannapoom, 2018
- Leptobrachium tengchongense Yang, Wang, & Chan, 2016
- Leptobrachium waysepuntiense Hamidy & Matsui, 2010
- Leptobrachium widianai Fauzan et al., 2026
- Leptobrachium xanthops Stuart, Phimmachak, Seateun & Sivongxay, 2012
- Leptobrachium xanthospilum Lathrop, Murphy, Orlov & Ho, 1998
