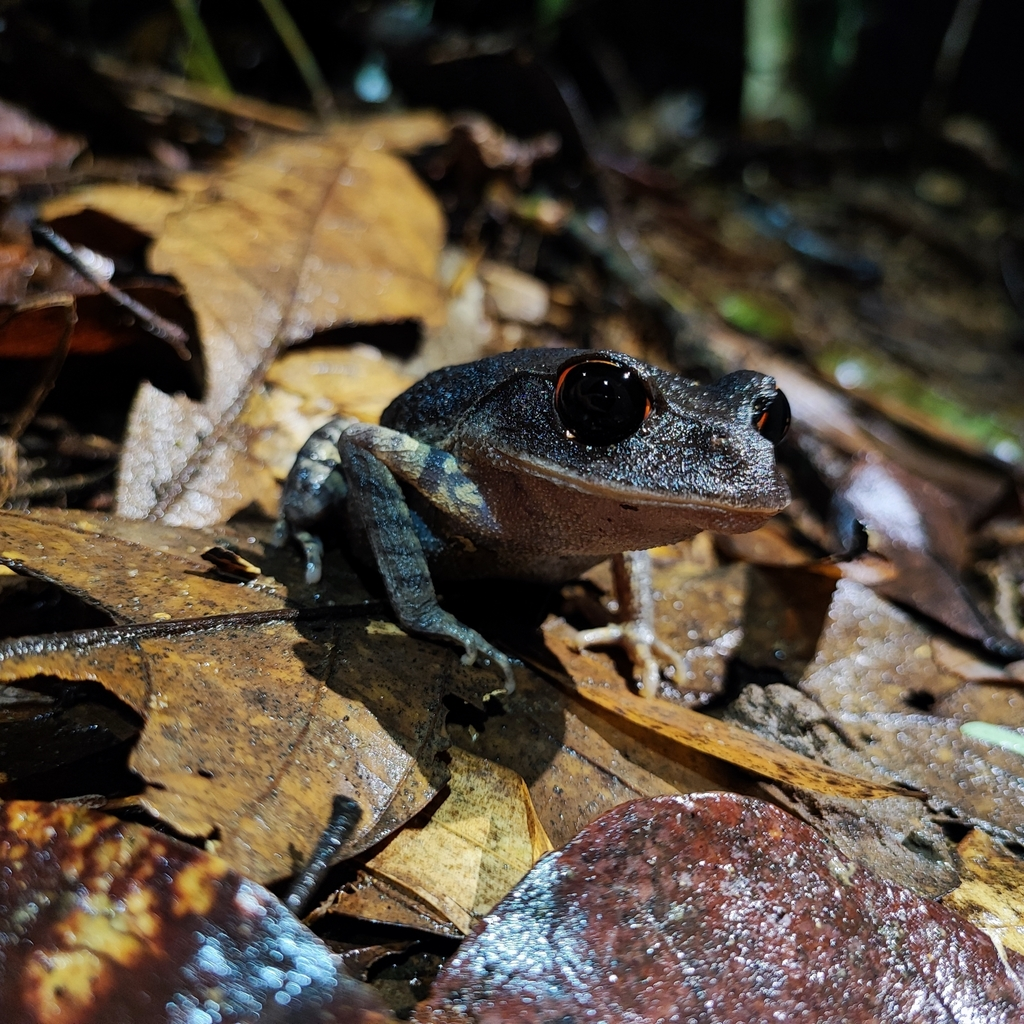

Conservation status
- Least Concern (IUCN 3.1)

Scientific classification
- Kingdom: Animalia
- Phylum: Chordata
- Class: Amphibia
- Order: Anura
- Family: Megophryidae
- Genus: Leptobrachium
- Species: L. pullum

Binomial name
- Leptobrachium pullum (Smith, 1921)

= Leptobrachium pullum =

Species of frog

Leptobrachium pullum is a species of frog in the family Megophryidae. It is endemic to Vietnam. Its natural habitats are rivers.

Its taxonomic relationship with Leptobrachium mouhoti, recently described from Cambodia, is unclear.
