= Dring's horned toad =

Conservation status
- Near Threatened (IUCN 3.1)

Scientific classification
- Kingdom: Animalia
- Phylum: Chordata
- Class: Amphibia
- Order: Anura
- Family: Megophryidae
- Subfamily: Megophryinae
- Genus: Sarawakiphrys; Lyu and Wang, 2023
- Species: S. dringi

Binomial name
- Sarawakiphrys dringi (Inger, Stuebing and Tan, 1995)

Synonyms
- Xenophrys dringi (Inger, Stuebing, and Tan, 1995); "Megophrys" dringi

Species of amphibian

Dring's horned toad (Sarawakiphrys dringi), or Dring's horned frog, is a species of frog in the family Megophryidae found in Mount Mulu in Sarawak, Borneo (Malaysia). It is the only species in the genus Sarawakiphrys. Its natural habitats are tropical moist montane forests and rivers.
