= Leptobrachium liui =

Conservation status
- Least Concern (IUCN 3.1)

Scientific classification
- Kingdom: Animalia
- Phylum: Chordata
- Class: Amphibia
- Order: Anura
- Family: Megophryidae
- Genus: Leptobrachium
- Species: L. liui

Binomial name
- Leptobrachium liui (Pope, 1947)

Synonyms
- Vibrissaphora liui Pope, 1947; Vibrissaphora yaoshanensis Liu and Hu, 1978; Vibrissaphora jiulongshanensis Wei and Zhao, 1981

Species of frog

Leptobrachium liui, the Chong'an moustache toad or Pope's spiny toad, is a species of frog in the family Megophryidae.

It is endemic to southern and southeastern China. Its natural habitats are subtropical or tropical moist lowland forests, subtropical or tropical moist montane forests, and rivers. It is threatened by habitat loss.
