= Leptobrachium tengchongense =

Scientific classification
- Kingdom: Animalia
- Phylum: Chordata
- Class: Amphibia
- Order: Anura
- Family: Megophryidae
- Genus: Leptobrachium
- Species: L. tengchongense

Binomial name
- Leptobrachium tengchongense Yang, Wang, and Chan, 2016

Species of amphibian

Leptobrachium tengchongense is a species of frogs in the family Megophryidae from the Gaoligong Mountains of Tengchong County, Yunnan, China.
