= Leptobrachium nigrops =

Conservation status
- Least Concern (IUCN 3.1)

Scientific classification
- Kingdom: Animalia
- Phylum: Chordata
- Class: Amphibia
- Order: Anura
- Family: Megophryidae
- Genus: Leptobrachium
- Species: L. nigrops

Binomial name
- Leptobrachium nigrops Berry & Hendrickson, 1963

Species of amphibian

Leptobrachium nigrops, also known as the black-eyed litter frog, is a species of amphibian in the family Megophryidae. It is found in Indonesia, Malaysia, and Singapore. Its natural habitats are subtropical or tropical moist lowland forests, subtropical or tropical swamps, and rivers. It is threatened by habitat loss.
