= Rhacophorus indonesiensis =

Conservation status
- Vulnerable (IUCN 3.1)

Scientific classification
- Kingdom: Animalia
- Phylum: Chordata
- Class: Amphibia
- Order: Anura
- Family: Rhacophoridae
- Genus: Rhacophorus
- Species: R. indonesiensis

Binomial name
- Rhacophorus indonesiensis Hamidy and Kurniati, 2015

Species of frog

Rhacophorus indonesiensis is a species of frog in the family Rhacophoridae. It has been observed in Sumatra in Indonesia.

This frog resembles other frogs in Rhacophorus closely. Its appearance differs in that it has black spots on the ventral sides of the webbed skin of its feet, its lack of vomerine teeth, a white mark on its belly in the shape of a kite. The skin of the dorsum is red-brown with brown blotches and smaller black spots. It has white spots on its head and back.

Scientists believe that deforestation for mining and palm oil plantations may pose a threat to this frog in the form of habitat loss.
