= Streptomyces indonesiensis =

Scientific classification
- Domain: Bacteria
- Kingdom: Bacillati
- Phylum: Actinomycetota
- Class: Actinomycetes
- Order: Streptomycetales
- Family: Streptomycetaceae
- Genus: Streptomyces
- Species: S. indonesiensis

Binomial name
- Streptomyces indonesiensis Sembiring et al. 2001

Type strain
- A4R2, A4R2 (S34), DSM 41759, JCM 11445, NBRC 100776, NCIMB 13673, NRRL B-24278

Species of bacterium

Streptomyces indonesiensis is a bacterium species from the genus of Streptomyces which has been isolated from the tree Paraserianthes falcataria from Yogyakarta on Java in Indonesia.

== See also ==
- List of Streptomyces species
