= Amir Hamidy =

Indonesian herpetologist

- Born: 14 October 1978 (age 47); Pacitan, Indonesia
- Education: Universitas Gadjah Mada; Kyoto University
- Known for: Research on Indonesian amphibians and reptiles
- Scientific career
- Fields: Herpetology, zoology
- Workplaces: Museum Zoologicum Bogoriense; Indonesian Institute of Sciences; National Research and Innovation Agency

Amir Hamidy (born 14 October 1978) is an Indonesian zoologist and herpetologist. He is a researcher in the Laboratory of Herpetology at the Museum Zoologicum Bogoriense, and has worked at the Indonesian Institute of Sciences (LIPI), now part of the National Research and Innovation Agency (BRIN).

== Biography ==
Amir Hamidy was born in Pacitan, East Java, on 14 October 1978. He completed his primary and secondary education in his hometown at SDN Baleharjo II and SMPN 1 Pacitan. He subsequently attended SMA Muhammadiyah 1 Yogyakarta and received his bachelor's degree from the Faculty of Biology at Universitas Gadjah Mada in 2004. In 2005, Hamidy joined the Center for Biological Research of the Indonesian Institute of Sciences (LIPI), working in zoology and vertebrate biosystematics. In 2010, he went to Japan for further study and obtained a master's degree from the Graduate School of Human and Environmental Studies at Kyoto University. He received his doctoral degree from the same university in 2013.

Hamidy has been involved in the Convention on International Trade in Endangered Species of Wild Fauna and Flora (CITES) and has been described as one of the relatively few Indonesian scientists involved with the convention. He has also served as chairman of the Perhimpunan Herpetologi Indonesia (Herpetological Society of Indonesia).

Hamidy's research has focused particularly on the taxonomy, systematics and conservation of Indonesian amphibians and reptiles. His work has resulted in the description of numerous new species of amphibians and reptiles. He continues to conduct research on Indonesian herpetofauna and has published extensively on its taxonomy, biodiversity and conservation.

== Taxa described ==
The following are selected species described by Hamidy, alone or with co-authors:

- Leptobrachium waysepuntiense Hamidy & Matsui, 2010
- Leptobrachium kantonishikawai Hamidy & Matsui, 2014
- Leptobrachium kanowitense Hamidy, Matsui, Nishikawa & Belabut, 2012
- Rhacophorus indonesiensis Hamidy & Kurniati, 2015
- Leptophryne javanica Hamidy, Munir, Mumpuni, Rahmania & Kholik, 2018
