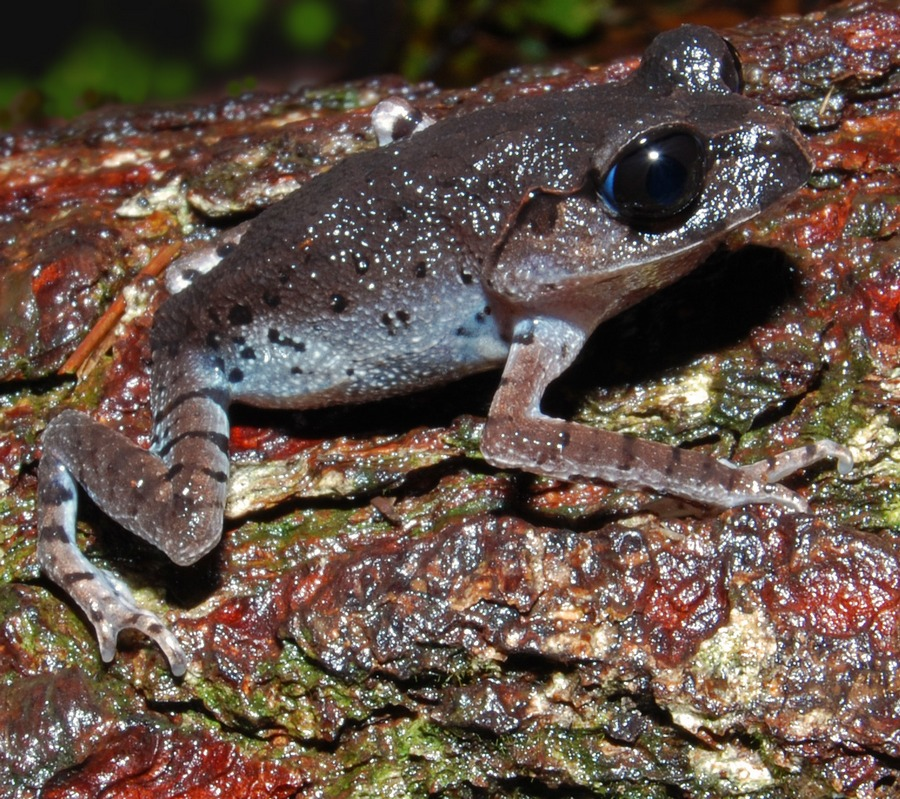
- Java spadefoot toad (Leptobrachium hasseltii)

Scientific classification
- Kingdom: Animalia
- Phylum: Chordata
- Class: Amphibia
- Order: Anura
- Superfamily: Pelobatoidea
- Family: Megophryidae; Bonaparte, 1850

Genera
- See text
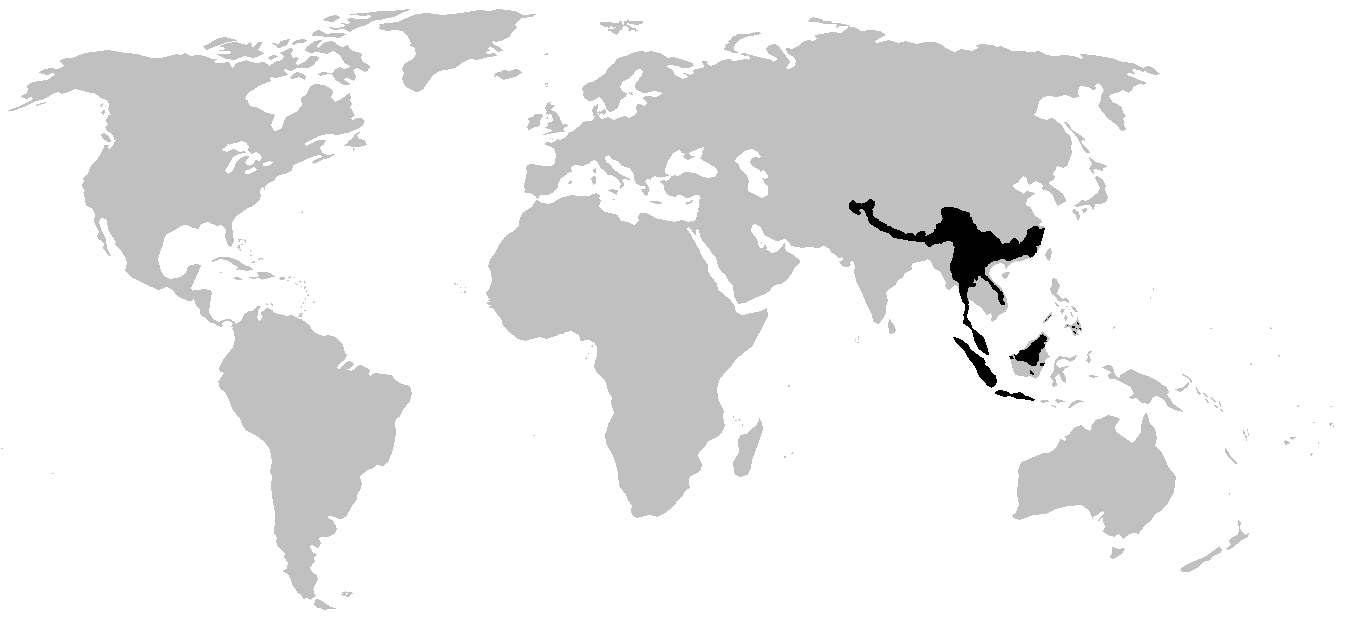
- Global range (black)

= Megophryidae =

Megophryidae Temporal range: Early Eocene to Recent, 50.3–0 Ma

Family of amphibians

Megophryidae, commonly known as goose frogs, is a large family of frogs native to the warm southeast of Asia, from the Himalayan foothills eastwards, south to Indonesia and the Greater Sunda Islands in Maritime Southeast Asia, and extending to the Philippines. Fossil remains are also known from North America. As of 2014 it encompasses 246 species of frogs divided between five genera. For lack of a better vernacular name, they are commonly called megophryids.

== Morphology ==
The megophryids are notable for their camouflage, especially those that live in forests, which often look like dead leaves. The camouflage is accurate to the point of some having skin folds that look like leaf veins, and at least one species, the long-nosed horned frog (Megophrys montana) has sharp projections extending past the eye and nose, which disguise the frog shape.

Megophryids range in size from 2 to 12.5 cm (0.79 to 4.92 in) in length. The adults' tongues are noticeably paddle-shaped. Their tadpoles can be found in a variety of waters, but especially ponds and streams. The tadpoles are extremely diverse in form because of the variety of habitats they inhabit.

== Genera ==
The following genera are recognised in the family Megophryidae; Amphibian Species of the World and AmphibiaWeb differ on the number of species per genera, leading to the variability in numbers:

- Subfamily Leptobrachiinae (pseudomoustache toads; 216 species)
  - Leptobrachella Smith, 1925 (Borneo frogs; 85-93 species)
  - Leptobrachium Tschudi, 1838 (eastern spadefoot toads; 38 species)
  - Leptolalax Dubois, 1980 (50 species)
  - Oreolalax Myers and Leviton, 1962 (19 species)
  - Scutiger Theobald, 1868 (cat-eyed toads; 24 species)
- Subfamily Megophryinae (124 species)
  - Atympanophrys Tian and Hu, 1983 (hidden-tympanum horned toads; 3-4 species)
  - Boulenophrys Fei, Ye, and Jiang, 2016 (Chinese horned toads; 65 species)
  - Brachytarsophrys Tian & Hu, 1983 (Karin Hills frogs; 8 species)
  - Grillitschia Dubois, Ohler, and Pyron, 2021 (2 species)
  - Jingophrys Lyu and Wang, 2023 (diminutive horned toads; 6 species)
  - Megophrys Kuhl and Van Hasselt, 1822 (Indonesian horned toads; 5-8 species)
  - Ophryophryne Boulenger, 1903 (narrow-mouth horned toads; 6 species)
  - Pelobatrachus Beddard, 1908 "1907" (clay horned toads; 7 species)
  - Sarawakiphrys Lyu and Wang, 2023 (Sarawak horned toads; 1 species)
  - Xenophrys Günther, 1864 (strange-horned toads; 28-31 species)

== Evolution ==
The origin of this group of frogs was largely unknown, due to the lack of members of this family in the fossil record. While the family was originally considered to have originated in the early-mid Cretaceous (100-126 mya) via fossils of related frog groups, a study in early 2017 revealed that this was likely an overestimation. Using DNA sequencing, the study indicated the group more likely originated much later during the Cretaceous period, around 77 mya. The study also indicated that there are likely many more new species in the family that are currently unknown to science.

While the family is currently restricted to Asia, fossils indicate that it once had a much wider distribution extending to North America. The earliest known fossils of this family are from the Eocene of Wyoming in the United States.
