= List of reptiles and amphibians of Mizoram =

This article lists the species of reptiles and amphibians found in the state of Mizoram, India. 117 reptiles and 52 amphibians have been sighted in the state. There have been many studies on the herpetofauna of the state. This list uses British English.

== Amphibians ==
=== Anura ===
==== Bufonidae ====
- Mizoram rock toad, Bufoides bhupathyi
- Khasi Hills toad, Bufoides meghalayanus
- Nagaland montane torrent toad, Duttaphrynus chandai
- Mamit's toad, Duttaphrynus mamitensis
- Kolasib's toad, Duttaphrynus mizoramensis
- Asian common toad, Duttaphrynus melanostictus

==== Dicroglossidae ====
- Bangladesh skittering frog, Euphlyctis adolfi
- Hong Kong rice-paddy frog, Fejervarya multistriata
- Coastal bullfrog, Hoplobatrachus litoralis
- Indus Valley bullfrog, Hoplobatrachus tigerinus
- Northern frog, Ingerana borealis
- Broad-headed frog, Limnonectes khasianus
- Bangladeshi cricket frog, Minervarya asmati

==== Megophryidae ====
- Tamdil slender-armed frog, Leptobrachella tamdil
- Garbhanga slender-armed frog, Leptobrachium aryatium
- Naga Hills horned frog, Xenophrys awuh
- Glandular horned toad, Xenophrys major
- Serchhip's horned toad, Xenophrys serchhipii
- Zunheboto horned toad, Xenophrys zunhebotoensis

==== Microhylidae ====
- Northeast Indian paddy frog, Micryletta aishani
- Mymensingh rice frog, Microhyla mymensinghensis
- Mukhlesur's narrow-mouthed frog, Microhyla mukhlesuri
- Berdmore's narrow-mouthed frog, Microhyla berdmorei
- Banded bullfrog, Kaloula pulchra

==== Ranidae ====
- Indoburman torrent frog, Amolops indoburmanensis
- Assam Hills frog, Clinotarsus alticola
- Crying stream frog, Hylarana lacrima
- Cope's assam frog, Hylarana leptoglossa
- Indian flying frog, Hylarana khare
- Green cascade frog, Odorrana chloronota
- Mawphlang wart frog, Odorrana mawphlangensis

==== Rhacophoridae ====
- Senapati's tree frog, Feihyla senapatiensis
- Yang's frill-limbed tree frog, Kurixalus yangi
- Jerdon's bubble-nest frog, Nasutixalus jerdonii
- Taiwan whipping frog, Polypedates braueri
- Burmese whipping frog, Polypedates mutus
- Six-lined tree frog, Polypedates teraiensis
- Barak valley bush frog, Raorchestes barakensis
- Garo bush frog, Raorchestes garo
- Lwangtlai bush frog, Raorchestes lawngtlaiensis
- Reza Khan's bush frog, Raorchestes rezakhani
- Twin-spotted flying frog, Rhacophorus bipunctatus
- Baibung small tree frog, Theloderma baibungense
- Xizang warty tree frog, Theloderma moloch
- Nagaland tree frog, Theloderma nagalandense
- White-lipped tree frog, Zhangixalus smaragdinus
- Suffry red-webbed tree frog, Zhangixalus suffry

=== Gymnophiona ===
- Benji's caecilian, Ichthyophis benjii
- Garo Hills caecilian, Ichthyophis garoensis
- Khumhzi striped caecilian, Ichthyophis khumhzi
- Manipiur moustached caecilian, Ichthyophis moustakius
- Colorful caecilian, Ichthyophis multicolor

== Reptiles ==
=== Testudines ===
==== Geoemydidae ====
- Burmese box turtle, Cuora lineata
- Keeled box turtle, Cuora mouhotii
- Assam leaf turtle, Cyclemys gemeli
- Oldham's leaf turtle, Cyclemys oldhami
- Tricarinate hill turtle, Melanochelys tricarinata
- Indian black turtle, Melanochelys trijuga
- Assam roofed turtle, Pangshura sylhetensis
- Indian roofed turtle, Pangshura tecta
- Indian tent turtle, Panghsura tentoria

==== Testudinidae ====
- Elongated tortoise, Indotestudo elongata
- Asian forest tortoise, Manouria emys

==== Trionychidae ====
- Southeast Asian softshell turtle, Amyda ornata
- Indian flapshell turtle, Lissemys punctata
- Indian peacock softshell turtle, Nilssonia hurum
- Black softshell turtle, Nilssonia nigricans
- Asian giant softshell turtle, Pelochelys cantorii

=== Squamata ===
==== Agamidae ====
- Forest garden lizard, Calotes emma
- Indochinese forest lizard, Calotes irawadi
- Ota's mountain lizard, Cristidorsa otai
- Smooth-scaled mountain lizard, Cristidorsa planidorsata
- Spotted flying lizard, Draco maculatus
- Norville's flying lizard, Draco norvillii
- Green fan-throated lizard, Ptyctolaemus gularis

==== Gekkonidae ====
- Aaron Bauer's bent-toed gecko, Cyrtodactylus aaronbaueri
- Northern Burmese half-toed gecko, Hemidactylus aquilonius
- Bengkhuaia's bent-toed gecko, Cyrtodactylus bengkhuaiai
- Lunglei bent-toed gecko, Cyrtodactylus lungleiensis
- Jampui bent-toed gecko, Cyrtodactylus montanus
- Ngengpui bent-toed gecko, Cyrtodactylus ngengpuiensis
- Ngopa bent-toed gecko, Cyrtodactylus ngopensis
- Siaha bent-toed gecko, Cyrtodactylus siahaensis
- Vairengte bent-toed gecko, Cyrtodactylus vairengtensis
- Tokay gecko, Gekko gecko
- Mizoram parachute gecko, Gekko mizoramensis
- Flat-tailed house gecko, Hemidactylus platyurus
- Indo-Pacific gecko, Hemidactylus garnotii
- Common house gecko, Hemidactylus frenatus

==== Lacertidae ====
- Khasi Hills long-tailed lizard, Takydromus khasiensis
- Asian grass lizard, Takydromus sexlineatus

==== Anguidae ====
- Asian glass lizard, Dopasia gracilis

==== Scincidae ====
- Bronze mabuya, Eutropis macularia
- Common sun skink, Eutropis multifasciata
- Indian forest skink, Sphenomorphus indicus
- Spotted forest skink, Sphenomorphus maculatus
- North-eastern water skink, Tropidophorus assamensis

==== Varanidae ====
- Bengal monitor, Varanus bengalensis
- Asian water monitor, Varanus salvator

==== Natricidae ====
- Buff striped keelback, Amphiesma stolatum
- Mizoram ground snake, Blythia hmuifang
- Blyth's reticulated snake, Blythia reticulata
- Checkered keelback, Fowlea piscator
- Khasi keelback, Hebius khasiensis
- Chin Hills keelback, Hebius venningi
- Murlen's keelback, Herpetoreas murlen
- Wall's keelback, Herpetoreas xenura
- Bindee keelback, Rhabdophis bindi
- Heller's red-necked keelback, Rhabdophis helleri
- Orange-collared keelback, Rhabdophis himalayanus
- Mizo rain snake, Smithophis atemporalis
- Narrow-banded rain snake, Smithophis leptofasciatus
- Mizoram trapezoid snake, Smithophis mizoramensis

==== Colubridae ====
- Yellow whip snake, Ahaetulla flavescens
- Green cat snake, Boiga cyanea
- Arrowback tree snake, Boiga gocool
- Many-spotted cat snake, Boiga multomaculata
- Assamese cat snake, Boiga quincunciata
- Eyed cat snake, Boiga siamensis
- Ornate flying snake, Chrysopelea ornata
- Radiated ratsnake, Coelognathus radiatus
- Gore's bronzeback, Dendrelaphis biloreatus
- Blue bronzeback, Dendrelaphis cyanochloris
- Eastern bronzeback, Dendrelaphis proarchos
- Beauty rat snake, Elaphe taeniura
- Mandarin rat snake, Euprepiophis mandarinus
- Günther's reed snake, Gongylosoma frenata
- Common ring-neck, Gongylosoma scriptum
- Khasi Hills trinket snake, Gonyosoma frenatum
- Green bush rat snake, Gonyosoma prasinum
- Stoliczka's reed snake, Liopeltis stoliczkae
- Indian wolf snake, Lycodon aulicus
- Banded wolf snake, Lycodon fasciatus
- Yellow-speckled wolf snake, Lycodon jara
- White-banded wolf snake, Lycodon septentrionalis
- Zaw's wolf snake, Lycodon zawi
- Light-barred kukri snake, Oligodon albocinctus
- Assam kukri snake, Oligodon catenatus
- Black cross-barred kukri snake, Oligodon cinereus
- Cantor's kukri snake, Oligodon cyclurus
- Bengalese kukri snake, Oligodon dorsalis
- Red mountain ratsnake, Oreocryptophis porphyraceus
- Indochinese ratsnake, Ptyas korros
- Oriental rat snake, Ptyas mucosa

==== Calamariidae ====
- Mizoram reed snake, Calamaria mizoramensis

==== Psammodynastidae ====
- Common mock viper, Psammodynastes pulverulentus

==== Pseudoxenodontidae ====
- Big-eyed bamboo snake, Pseudoxenodon macrops

==== Pareidae ====
- Anderson's slug snake, Pareas andersonii
- Small slug snake, Pareas modestus
- Common slug snake, Pareas monticola

==== Homalopsidae ====
- Siebold's water snake, Ferania sieboldii

==== Elapidae ====
- Monocled cobra, Naja kaouthia
- Gore's coral snake, Sinomicrurus gorei
- MacClelland's coral snake, Sinomicrurus macclellandi
- Northern king cobra, Ophiophagus hannah
- Banded krait, Bungarus fasciatus
- Greater black krait, Bungarus niger

==== Sibynophiidae ====
- Collared black-headed snake, Sibynophis collaris

==== Viperidae ====
- Chinese mountain pit viper, Ovophis monticola
- Brown-spotted pit viper, Protobothrops mucrosquamatus
- Spot-tailed pt viper, Trimeresurus erythrurus
- Maya's pit viper, Trimeresurus mayaae
- Pope's pit viper, Trimeresurus popeiorum
- Uetz's pit viper, Trimeresurus uetzi

==== Pythonidae ====
- Reticulated python, Malayopython reticulatus
- Burmese python, Python bivittatus

==== Typhlopidae ====
- Diard's wolf snake, Argyrophis diardii
- Brahminy blind snake, Indotyphlops braminus
- Jerdon's blind snake, Indotyphlops jerdoni
