= Xenophrys lekaguli =

Conservation status
- Least Concern (IUCN 3.1)

Scientific classification
- Kingdom: Animalia
- Phylum: Chordata
- Class: Amphibia
- Order: Anura
- Family: Megophryidae
- Genus: Xenophrys
- Species: X. lekaguli

Binomial name
- Xenophrys lekaguli (Stuart, Chuaynkern, Chan-ard, and Inger, 2006)

Synonyms
- Megophrys lekaguli Stuart, Chuaynkern, Chan-ard, and Inger, 2006

Species of frog

Xenophrys lekaguli is a species of frog in the family Megophryidae. It is endemic to Southeast Asia and is known from the Chanthaburi and Sa Kaeo Provinces in eastern Thailand and from the Cardamom Mountains in Pursat Province, western Cambodia. The specific name commemorates Thai zoologist and conservationist Dr Boonsong Lekagul.

== Description ==
Xenophrys lekaguli is a medium-sized Xenophrys, the female having a body length of up to 94 mm (3.7 in), the male up to 67 mm (2.6 in) in snout–vent length. The upper parts are light brown with darker markings, the flank is yellowish and the underside pinkish. The legs have black spots. The bluntly pointed snout projects distinctly beyond the lower jaw. The species is most similar to Xenophrys auralensis and Xenophrys major but can be distinguished from the former by the smaller size of the male and the presence of teeth on the vomer and from the latter by lacking a pale stripe above the mouth and having a patterned (as opposed to plain) eyelid. The slender tadpole has the mouth shaped like an upturned funnel, which is typical of the genus.

== Habitat and conservation ==
Xenophrys lekaguli occurs near cascade streams in hilly evergreen and evergreen-bamboo mixed forests at elevations of 600–1,290 m (1,970–4,230 ft) above sea level. They can be typically found on boulders, leaf litter or bare soil within 20 m (66 ft) from the stream banks.

This species can occur in slightly disturbed habitats. It is threatened by habitat loss and modification caused by (selective) logging and agriculture. It is present in a number of protected areas.
