= Xenophrys oropedion =

Conservation status
- Endangered (IUCN 3.1)

Scientific classification
- Kingdom: Animalia
- Phylum: Chordata
- Class: Amphibia
- Order: Anura
- Family: Megophryidae
- Genus: Xenophrys
- Species: X. oropedion

Binomial name
- Xenophrys oropedion (Mahony, Teeling, and Biju, 2013)

Synonyms
- Megophrys oropedion Mahony, Teeling, and Biju, 2013

Species of frog

Xenophrys oropedion is a species of frog in the family Megophryidae from East Khasi Hills District, Meghalaya, India.
