= Zhang's horned toad =

Conservation status
- Least Concern (IUCN 3.1)

Scientific classification
- Kingdom: Animalia
- Phylum: Chordata
- Class: Amphibia
- Order: Anura
- Family: Megophryidae
- Genus: Xenophrys
- Species: X. zhangi

Binomial name
- Xenophrys zhangi (Ye & Fei, 1992)

Synonyms
- Megophrys zhangi Ye & Fei, 1992

Species of frog

Zhang's horned toad (Xenophrys zhangi), or Zhang's spadefoot toad, is a species of frog in the family Megophryidae. It was formerly only known from Zhangmu, Nyalam County, Tibet, China (just across the border from Kodari, Nepal), but is now known to be widespread throughout Nepal and also to inhabit four locations in India.

Its natural habitats are temperate forests and rivers.
