= Gonyosoma hainanense =

Scientific classification
- Kingdom: Animalia
- Phylum: Chordata
- Class: Reptilia
- Order: Squamata
- Suborder: Serpentes
- Family: Colubridae
- Genus: Gonyosoma
- Species: G. hainanense

Binomial name
- Gonyosoma hainanense Peng, Zhang, Huang, Burbrink, & Wang, 2021

Species of snake

Gonyosoma hainanense is a species of non-venomous snake in the family Colubridae. The species is found in China.
