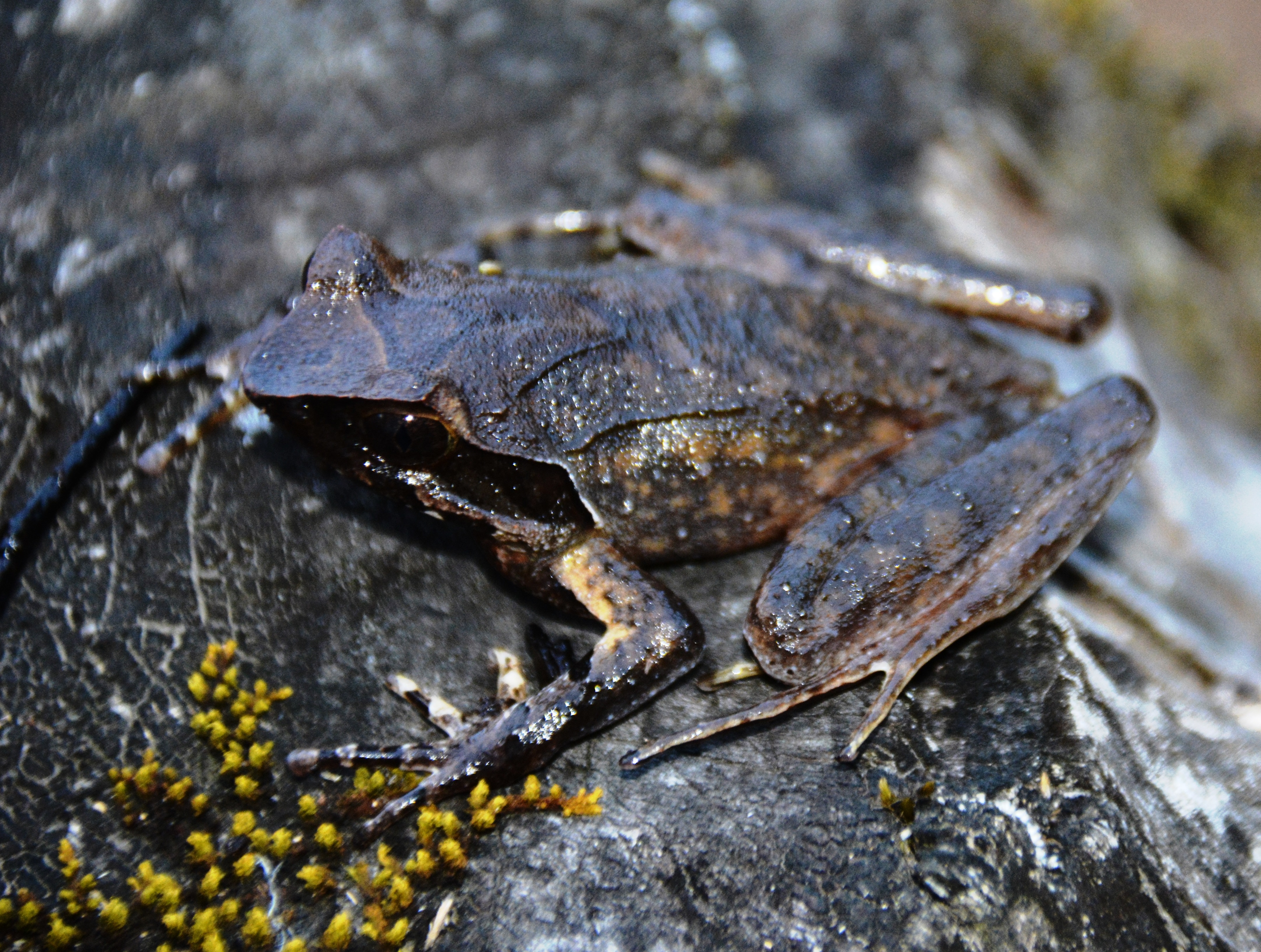

Scientific classification
- Kingdom: Animalia
- Phylum: Chordata
- Class: Amphibia
- Order: Anura
- Family: Megophryidae
- Genus: Xenophrys
- Species: X. apatani

Binomial name
- Xenophrys apatani Saikia et al, 2024

= Xenophrys apatani =

Species of frog

Xenophrys apatani, is a species of horned toad of Xenophrys genus, discovered from Arunachal Pradesh in Northeast India. The species is named after Apatani tribe of Arunachal Pradesh.

This leaf litter dwelling frog belongs to the family Megophryidae. It is found in Tale Wildlife Sanctuary located in the Lower Subansiri District of Arunachal Pradesh, India. It is dark brown in colour. It is dark brown in colour, with large mottling on the back, and a typical dark triangular patch between the eyes. The new species was first erroneously reported as Xenophrys maosonensis from Arunachal Pradesh in 2019 due to overlapping morphological characters and limited molecular evidence.

Taxonomical studies of Mahony et al. (2018) and Lyu et al. (2023) on the Xenophrys genus suggested that multiple potential new species-level taxa in Vietnam and China had been erroneously reported as Xenophrys maosonensis. A revisionary study was undertaken for the specimen from Arunachal Pradesh to ascertain its species status. This revisionary study involved a thorough re-examination of the specimen and a robust phylogenetic analysis of the subfamily Megophryinae, using 142 sequences of mt 16S rRNA. This resulted in the conclusion that the earlier report of Xenophrys maosonensis from India was incorrect. The specimen from Tale Wildlife Sanctuary in Arunachal Pradesh belongs to a previously unnamed species of Xenophrys, which has now been described as Xenophrys apatani.
