= Gonyosoma jansenii =

Conservation status
- Least Concern (IUCN 3.1)

Scientific classification
- Kingdom: Animalia
- Phylum: Chordata
- Class: Reptilia
- Order: Squamata
- Suborder: Serpentes
- Family: Colubridae
- Genus: Gonyosoma
- Species: G. jansenii

Binomial name
- Gonyosoma jansenii Bleeker, 1858

Synonyms
- Gonyosoma janseni Bleeker, 1858; Allophis (Elaphis) nigricaudus W. Peters, 1872; Coluber janseni — Boulenger, 1894; Gonyosoma jansenii — Dowling, 1958; Elaphe janseni — Schulz, 1996; Gonyosoma jansenii — Wallach et al., 2014

Species of snake

Gonyosoma jansenii, commonly known as the Celebes black-tailed rat snake, the Celebes ratsnake, and Jansen's rat snake, is a species of snake in the subfamily Colubrinae of the family Colubridae. The species is endemic to the Indonesian island of Sulawesi.

== Etymology ==
The specific name, jansenii, is in honor of Albert Jacques Frédéric Jansen, who was an administrator in the Dutch East Indies.

== Habitat ==
The preferred natural habitat of G. jansenii, is forest, at altitudes from sea level to 1,000 m (3,300 ft).

== Description ==
A long snake, G. jansenii may attain a total length of 199 cm (6.53 ft), which includes a tail length of 45 cm (1.48 ft). Adults are olive or yellowish brown on the anterior and middle portions of the body, with some scales black-edged. They are entirely black on the posterior portion of the body and tail (Boulenger, 1894).

== Behavior ==
G. jansenii is semi-arboreal.

== Reproduction ==
G. jansenii is oviparous.
