= Convex-vented horned toad =

Conservation status
- Data Deficient (IUCN 3.1)

Scientific classification
- Kingdom: Animalia
- Phylum: Chordata
- Class: Amphibia
- Order: Anura
- Family: Megophryidae
- Genus: Xenophrys
- Species: X. pachyproctus

Binomial name
- Xenophrys pachyproctus (Huang, 1981)

Synonyms
- Megophrys pachyproctus Huang, 1981

Species of frog

The convex-vented horned toad (Xenophrys pachyproctus), also known as the Gelin spadefoot toad or Huang's spadefoot toad, is a species of frog in the family Megophryidae. It is found in Tibet (China) and northern Vietnam, and possibly in India. Its natural habitats are subtropical or tropical moist montane forests and rivers.

Xenophrys pachyproctus is a small toad, measuring only 36 mm (1.4 in) in length.
