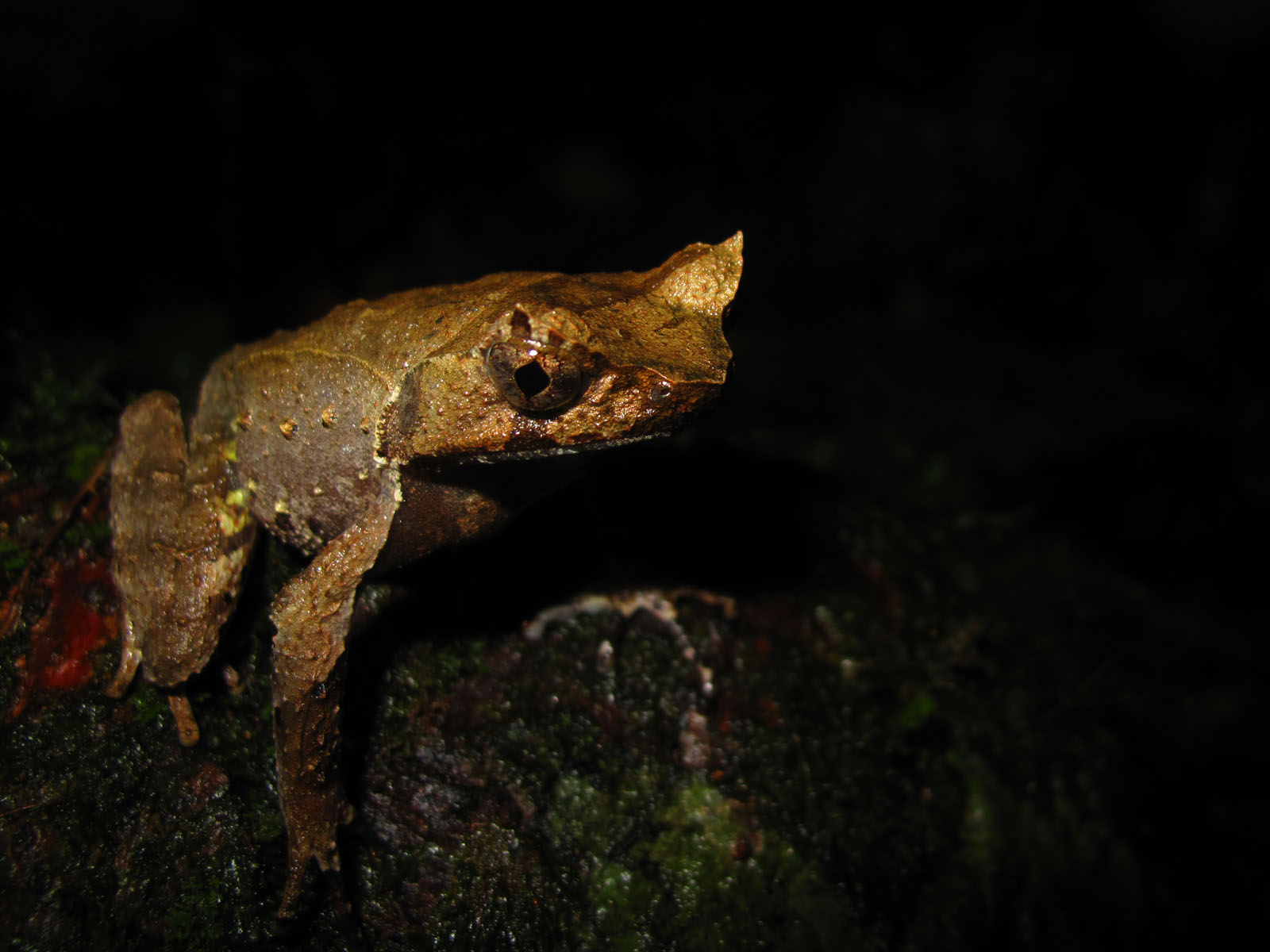

Conservation status
- Least Concern (IUCN 3.1)

Scientific classification
- Kingdom: Animalia
- Phylum: Chordata
- Class: Amphibia
- Order: Anura
- Family: Megophryidae
- Genus: Xenophrys
- Species: X. aceras

Binomial name
- Xenophrys aceras (Boulenger, 1903)

Synonyms
- Megalophrys montana var. aceras Boulenger, 1903; Megophrys aceras Boulenger, 1903

= Xenophrys aceras =

Species of frog

Xenophrys aceras, commonly known as the Perak horned toad, Perak spadefoot toad or Malayan horned frog, is a species of frog in the family Megophryidae found in Peninsular Malaysia and Thailand, and possibly in Indonesia. Its common name refers to its type locality, Bukit Besar in Perak state, Malaysia.

== Description ==
Male Xenophrys aceras grow to snout-vent length of 48–57 mm (1.9–2.2 in) and females to 67–86 mm (2.6–3.4 in). They have smooth back with scattered warts and low ridges and short dermal projections on top of the eyelids (the "horn"). The dorsal colour is variable from grey, brown to bright orange; they usually have a triangular mark between the eyes. Ventral side is brown.

== Habitat ==
Its natural habitats are tropical moist lowland forests and moist montane forests. Tadpoles develop in forest streams. While it is a widespread species and classified by IUCN as of "Least Concern", it is potentially threatened by habitat loss.
