= Xenophrys takensis =

Conservation status
- Endangered (IUCN 3.1)

Scientific classification
- Kingdom: Animalia
- Phylum: Chordata
- Class: Amphibia
- Order: Anura
- Family: Megophryidae
- Genus: Xenophrys
- Species: X. takensis

Binomial name
- Xenophrys takensis (Mahony, 2011)

Synonyms
- Megophrys takensis Mahony, 2011

Species of frog

Xenophrys takensis, also known as the Tak horned toad, is a species of frog in the family Megophryidae from Tak Province, Thailand.
