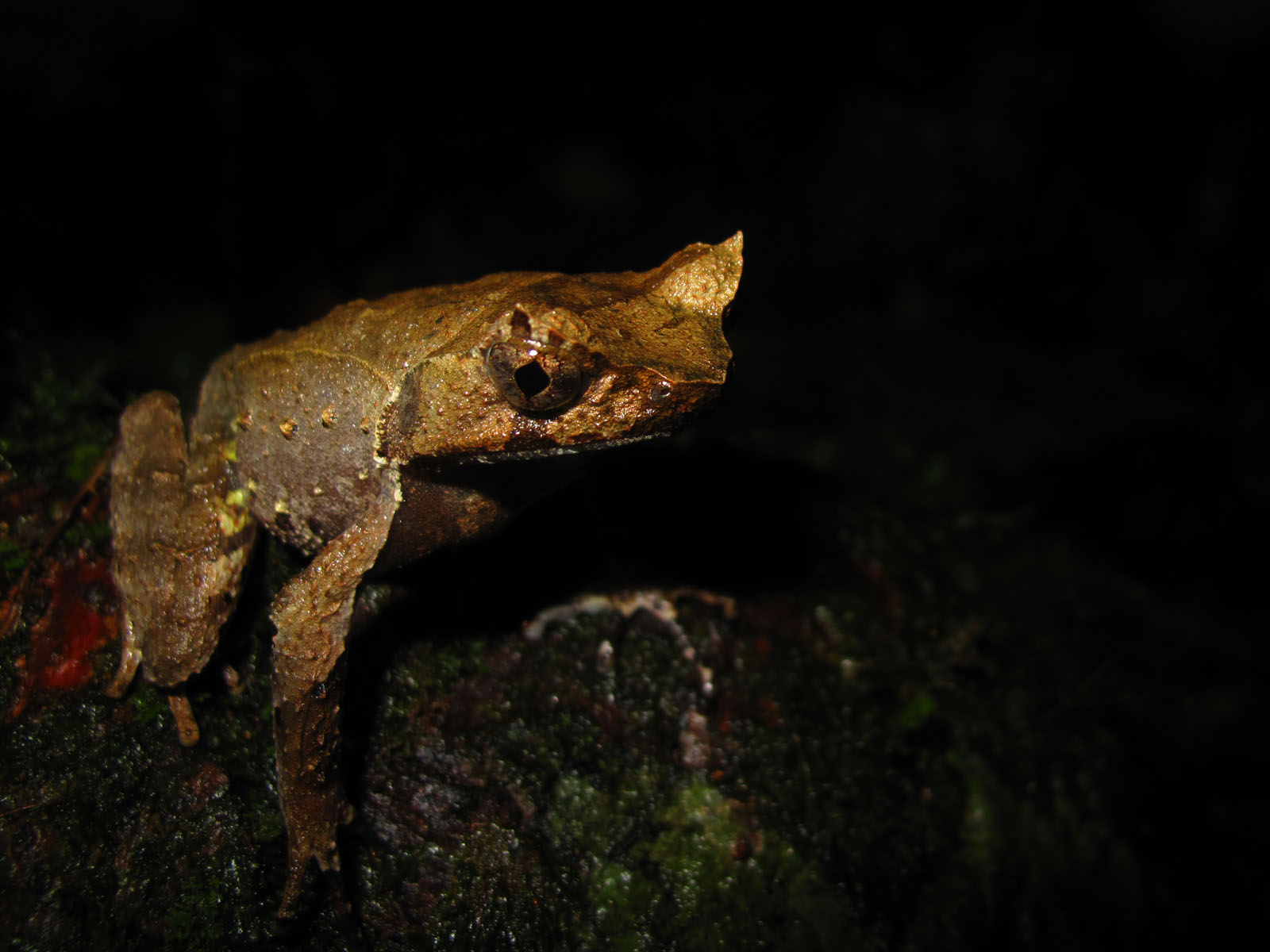
- Xenophrys aceras

Scientific classification
- Kingdom: Animalia
- Phylum: Chordata
- Class: Amphibia
- Order: Anura
- Family: Megophryidae
- Subfamily: Megophryinae
- Genus: Xenophrys; Günther, 1864

Type species
- Xenophrys monticola Günther, 1864

Species
- See text

= Xenophrys =

Genus of amphibians

Xenophrys is a genus of amphibians in the family Megophryidae. They are found in southeastern Asia (including China and northeastern India) to Borneo. Their common name is strange-horned toads.

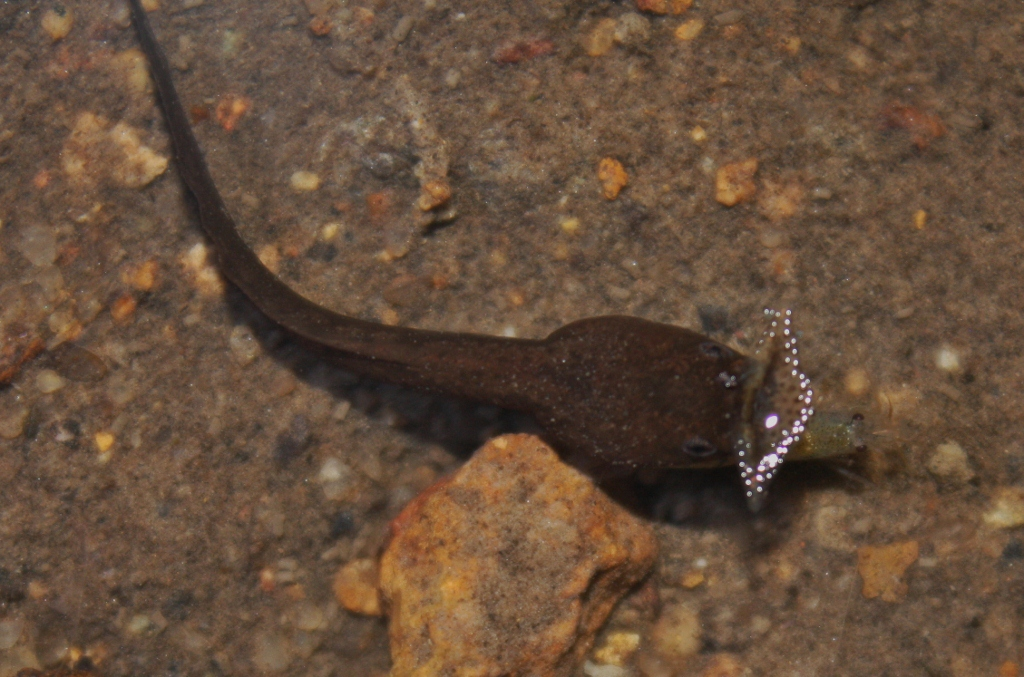
Tadpole of Xenophrys brachykolos

== Conservation ==
Of the 36 Xenophrys species that the International Union for Conservation of Nature has evaluated, most are either "Data Deficient" or of "Least Concern". However, one species is considered "Critically Endangered" (Xenophrys damrei) "Endangered" (Xenophrys takensis), one is "Vulnerable" (Xenophrys auralensis), and six are "Near Threatened".

== Taxonomy ==
The genus was previously found to be strongly polyphyletic, and awaiting a better solution, they were synonymized in the genus Megophrys. Following subsequent studies and reclassification, the genus has been revalidated.

=== Species ===
Presently, Amphibian Species of the World classifies the following 31 species in Xenophrys:

- Xenophrys aceras (Boulenger, 1903) — Perak horned toad
- Xenophrys ancrae (Mahony, Teeling & Biju, 2013) — Namdapha horned toadfrog
- Xenophrys apatani Saikia et al., 2024
- Xenophrys auralensis (Ohler, Swan, and Daltry, 2002) — Aural horned toad
- Xenophrys awuh (Mahony, Kamei, Teeling, and Biju, 2020) — Naga Hills horned frog
- Xenophrys damrei (Mahony, 2011) — Damrei horned toad
- Xenophrys dzukou (Mahony, Kamei, Teeling, and Biju, 2020) — Dzükou Valley horned frog
- Xenophrys flavipunctata (Mahony, Kamei, Teeling, and Biju, 2018) — yellow spotted white-lipped horned frog
- Xenophrys glandulosa (Fei, Ye, and Huang, 1990) — glandular horned toad
- Xenophrys himalayana (Mahony, Kamei, Teeling, and Biju, 2018) — Himalayan horned frog
- Xenophrys lekaguli (Stuart, Chuaynkern, Chan-ard, and Inger, 2006) — Lekagul's horned toad
- Xenophrys longipes (Boulenger, 1886) — red-legged horned toad
- Xenophrys major (Boulenger, 1908) — Great Stream horned toad
- Xenophrys mangshanensis (Fei and Ye, 1990) — Mangshan horned toad
- Xenophrys maosonensis (Bourret, 1937) — Maoson horned toad
- Xenophrys medogensis (Fei, Ye, and Huang, 1983) — Medog horned toad
- Xenophrys megacephala (Mahony, Sengupta, Kamei, and Biju, 2011) — big-headed horned frog
- Xenophrys monticola Günther, 1864 — mountain horned frog
- Xenophrys numhbumaeng (Mahony, Kamei, Teeling, and Biju, 2020) — Tamenglong horned frog
- Xenophrys oreocrypta (Mahony, Kamei, Teeling, and Biju, 2018) — Garo white-lipped horned frog
- Xenophrys oropedion (Mahony, Teeling & Biju, 2013) — Shyllong horned toad
- Xenophrys pachyproctus (Huang, 1981) — convex-vented horned toad
- Xenophrys periosa (Mahony, Kamei, Teeling, and Biju, 2018) — giant Himalayan horned frog
- Xenophrys robusta (Boulenger, 1908) — robust horned toad
- Xenophrys serchhipii Mathew and Sen, 2007 — Serchhip horned toad
- Xenophrys takensis (Mahony, 2011) — Tak horned toad
- Xenophrys tongbiguanensis (Wu, Yu, Chen, and Che, 2025) - Tongbiguan horned toad
- Xenophrys truongsonensis Luong, Hoang, Pham, Nguyen, Orlov, Ziegler, and Nguyen, 2022 — Truongson horned toad
- Xenophrys vegrandis (Mahony, Teeling, Biju, 2013)
- Xenophrys yeae (Shi, Zhang, Xie, Jiang, Liu, Ding, Luan, and Wang, 2020) — Ye's horned toad
- Xenophrys zhangi (Ye and Fei, 1992) — Zhang's horned toad
- Xenophrys zhoui (Shi, Zhang, Xie, Jiang, Liu, Ding, Luan, and Wang, 2020) — Zhou's horned toad
- Xenophrys zunhebotoensis Mathew and Sen, 2007 — Zunheboto horned toad
