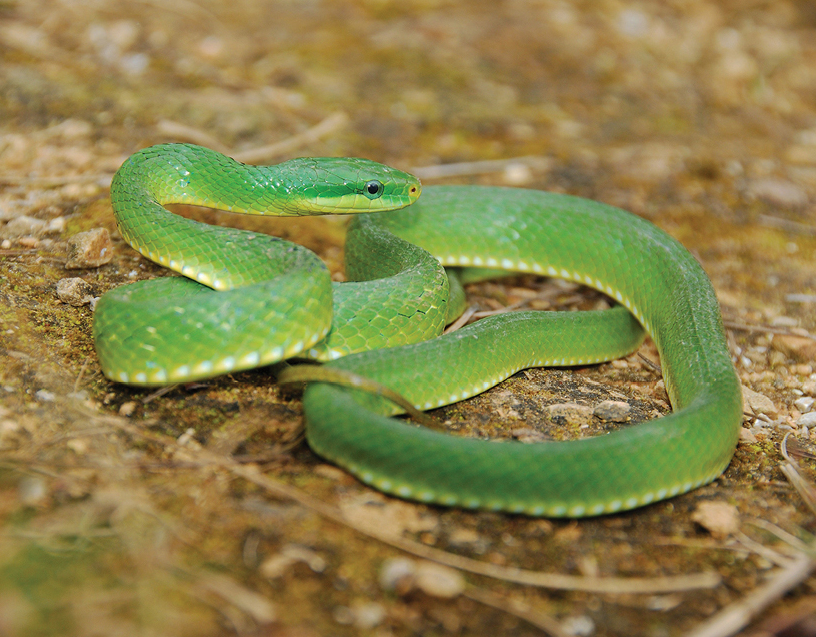

Scientific classification
- Kingdom: Animalia
- Phylum: Chordata
- Class: Reptilia
- Order: Squamata
- Suborder: Serpentes
- Family: Colubridae
- Genus: Gonyosoma
- Species: G. coeruleum

Binomial name
- Gonyosoma coeruleum Liu, Hou, Lwin, Wang, & Rao, 2021

= Gonyosoma coeruleum =

Species of snake

Gonyosoma coeruleum is a species of non-venomous snake in the family Colubridae. The species is found in China, Vietnam, Thailand, Malaysia, and Myanmar.
