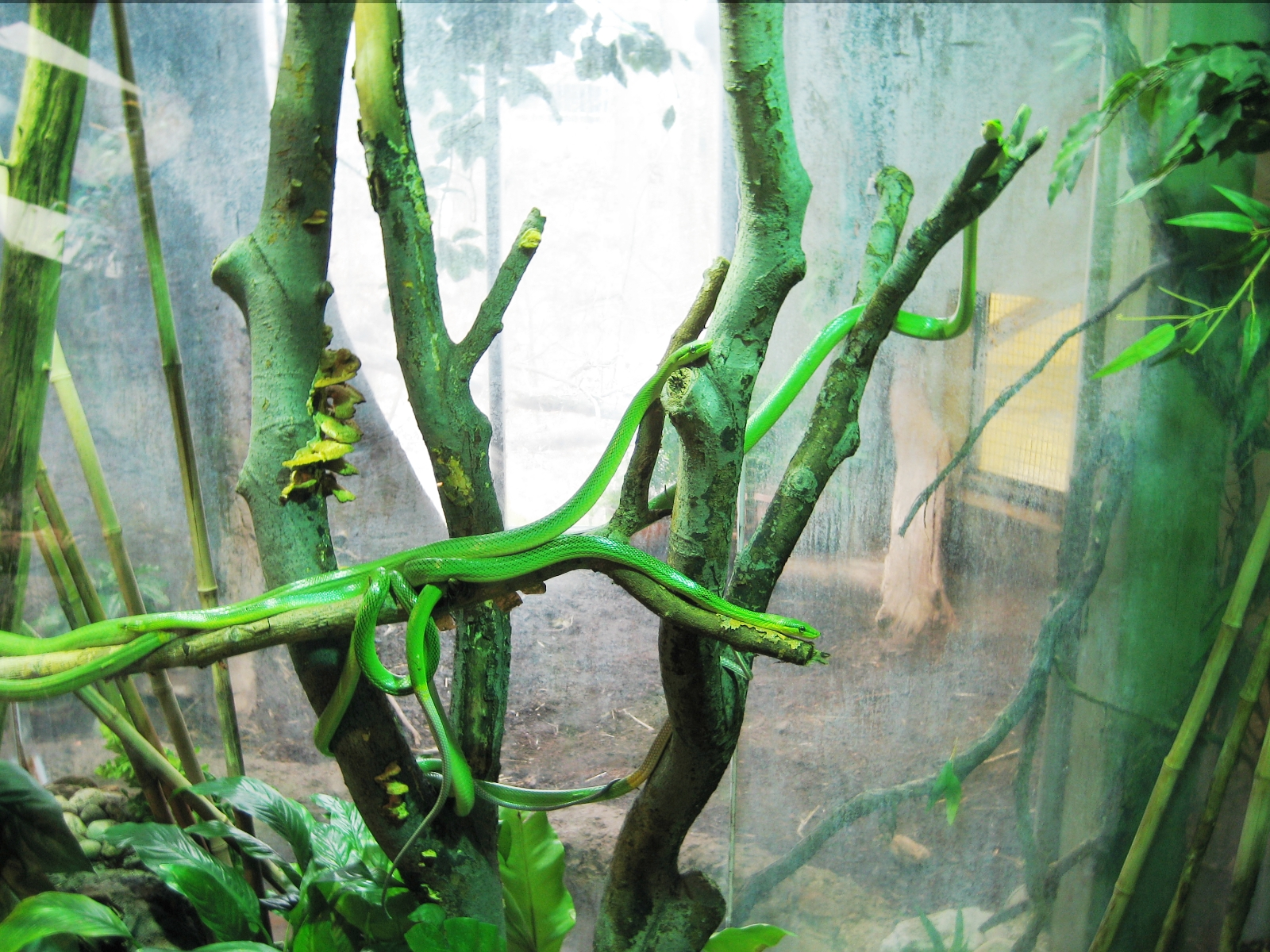
- Gonyosoma oxycephalum at the Toronto Zoo

Scientific classification
- Kingdom: Animalia
- Phylum: Chordata
- Class: Reptilia
- Order: Squamata
- Suborder: Serpentes
- Family: Colubridae
- Subfamily: Colubrinae
- Genus: Gonyosoma; Wagler, 1828

Type species
- Gonyosoma oxycephalum

Species
- 8 species, see text.

= Gonyosoma =

Genus of snakes

Gonyosoma is a genus of snakes in the family Colubridae.

== Description ==
There are a few distinct morphological characteristics that distinguish Gonyosoma from Elaphe. In scutellation there are 2-3 supralabials that contact the eye, with typically two in G. oxycephalum, and three in G. jansenii. The supralabial at the posterior of the eye is highly arched around the back of the eye. The loreal scale is thin and elongate, and appears stretched between the preocular and the nasal. Other diagnostic features is an elongate left rudimentary lung (70–141 mm), and a distinct hemipenes structure.

== Behavior ==
These snakes have the ability to laterally compress and inflate the first third of their bodies when threatened. The inflated region is typically recoiled into an S, which is elevated above the horizontal forming a typical striking position. The inflation of the body exposes the black and white diagonal bands of the interstitial skin, which is particularly distinct in G. oxycephalum (Schulz 1996). In combination these adaptations impose a most ominous threat!

== Species ==
The following 8 species are recognized as being valid.

Image	Scientific name	Common name	Distribution
	Gonyosoma boulengeri (Mocquard, 1897)	rhinoceros snake, rhino rat snake, and Vietnamese longnose snake	northern Vietnam to southern China
	Gonyosoma coeruleum Liu, Hou, Lwin, Wang, & Rao, 2021		China, Vietnam, Thailand, Malaysia, and Myanmar
	Gonyosoma frenatum (Gray, 1853)	Khasi Hills trinket snake	Northeast India, southern China, Taiwan, and Vietnam.
	Gonyosoma hainanense Peng, Zhang, Huang, Burbrink, & Wang, 2021	Hainan rhinoceros snake	China
	Gonyosoma jansenii (Bleeker, 1859)	Celebes black-tailed ratsnake	Sulawesi in Indonesia
	Gonyosoma margaritatum (W. Peters, 1871)	rainbow tree snake and royal tree snake	Malaysia and Singapore.
	Gonyosoma oxycephalum (F. Boie, 1827)	arboreal ratsnake, the red-tailed green ratsnake, and the red-tailed racer	Southeast Asia.
	Gonyosoma prasinum (Blyth, 1854)	green trinket snake, green bush rat snake or green ratsnake	Bangladesh, India (Darjeeling, Assam, Arunachal Pradesh, Burma (also known as Myanmar), northern Thailand, west Malaysia, Laos, Vietnam, China (Yunnan, Guizhou, Hainan) and Philippines.

Nota bene: A binomial authority in parentheses indicates that the species was originally described in a genus other than Gonyosoma.

The species formerly known as Gonyosoma cantoris and Gonyosoma hodgsoni have been assigned to the genus Othriophis as Othriophis cantoris and Othriophis hodgsoni, respectively.
