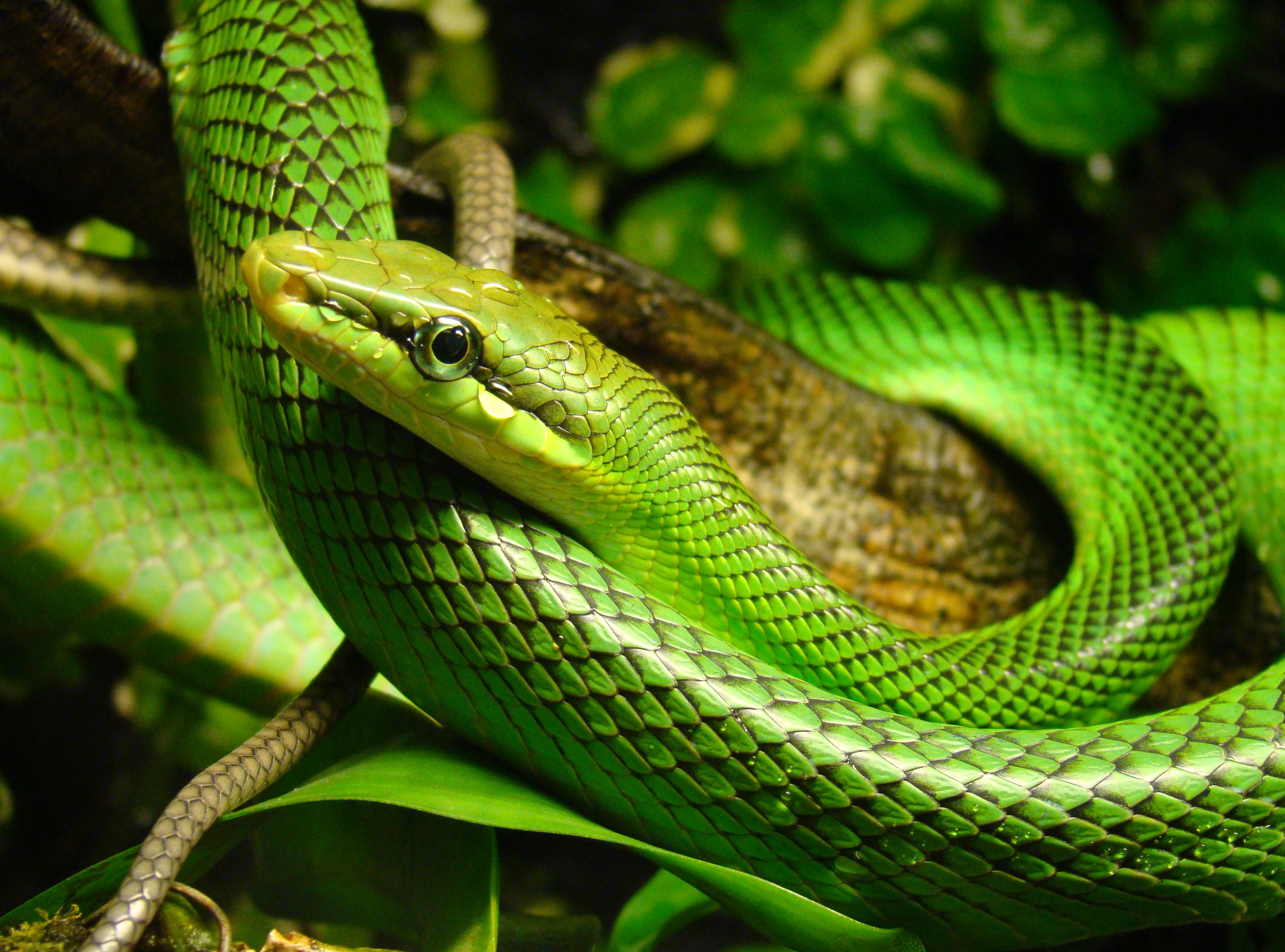
- Red-tailed green ratsnake

Conservation status
- Least Concern (IUCN 3.1)

Scientific classification
- Kingdom: Animalia
- Phylum: Chordata
- Class: Reptilia
- Order: Squamata
- Suborder: Serpentes
- Family: Colubridae
- Genus: Gonyosoma
- Species: G. oxycephalum

Binomial name
- Gonyosoma oxycephalum (F. Boie, 1827)
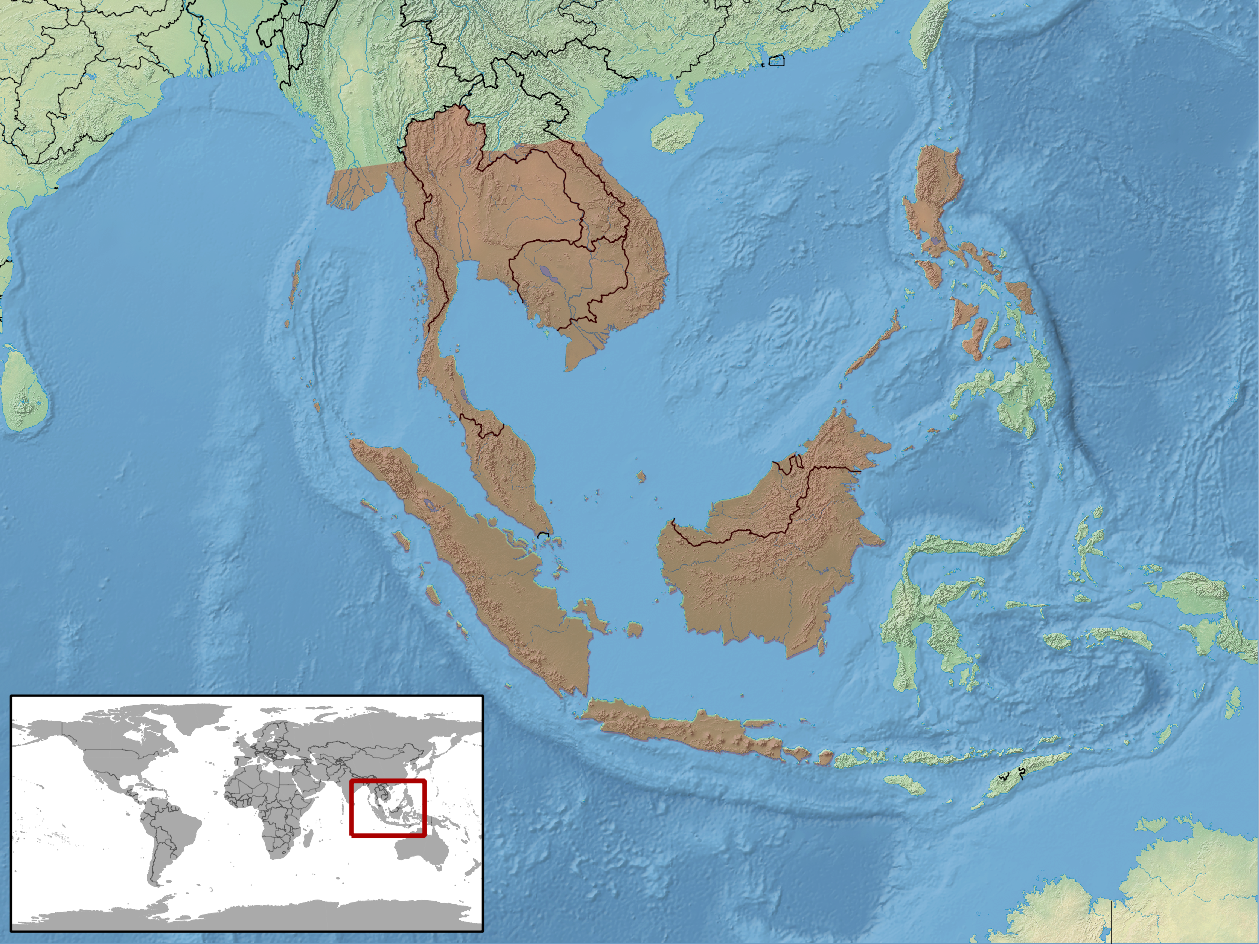

Synonyms
- Elaphe oxycephala (Boie, 1827)

= Gonyosoma oxycephalum =

Red-tailed green ratsnake

Species of reptile

Gonyosoma oxycephalum, known commonly as the arboreal ratsnake, the red-tailed green rat snake, and the red-tailed racer, is a species of snake in the family Colubridae. The species is endemic to Southeast Asia.

It was first described by Friedrich Boie in 1827.

== Distribution ==
G. oxycephalumm is found in

- Indonesia (Bangka, Belitung, Java, Kalimantan/Borneo, Karimata, Legundi, Lombok, Mentawai islands, Natuna islands, Nias, Panaitan, Riau archipelago, Sebuku, Sumatra, Tambelan archipelago),
- Malaysia (Malaya and East Malaysia, Pulau Tioman ?),
- Singapore Island, Penang Island,
- India (Andaman Islands),
- Myanmar,
- Thailand (incl. Phuket), Cambodia, Laos, Vietnam,
- Philippine Islands (Balabac, Bohol, Catanduanes, Lubang, Luzon, Negros, Palawan, Sulu Archipelago, Panay).

The type locality is Indonesia: Java (F. Boie, 1827).

== Description ==
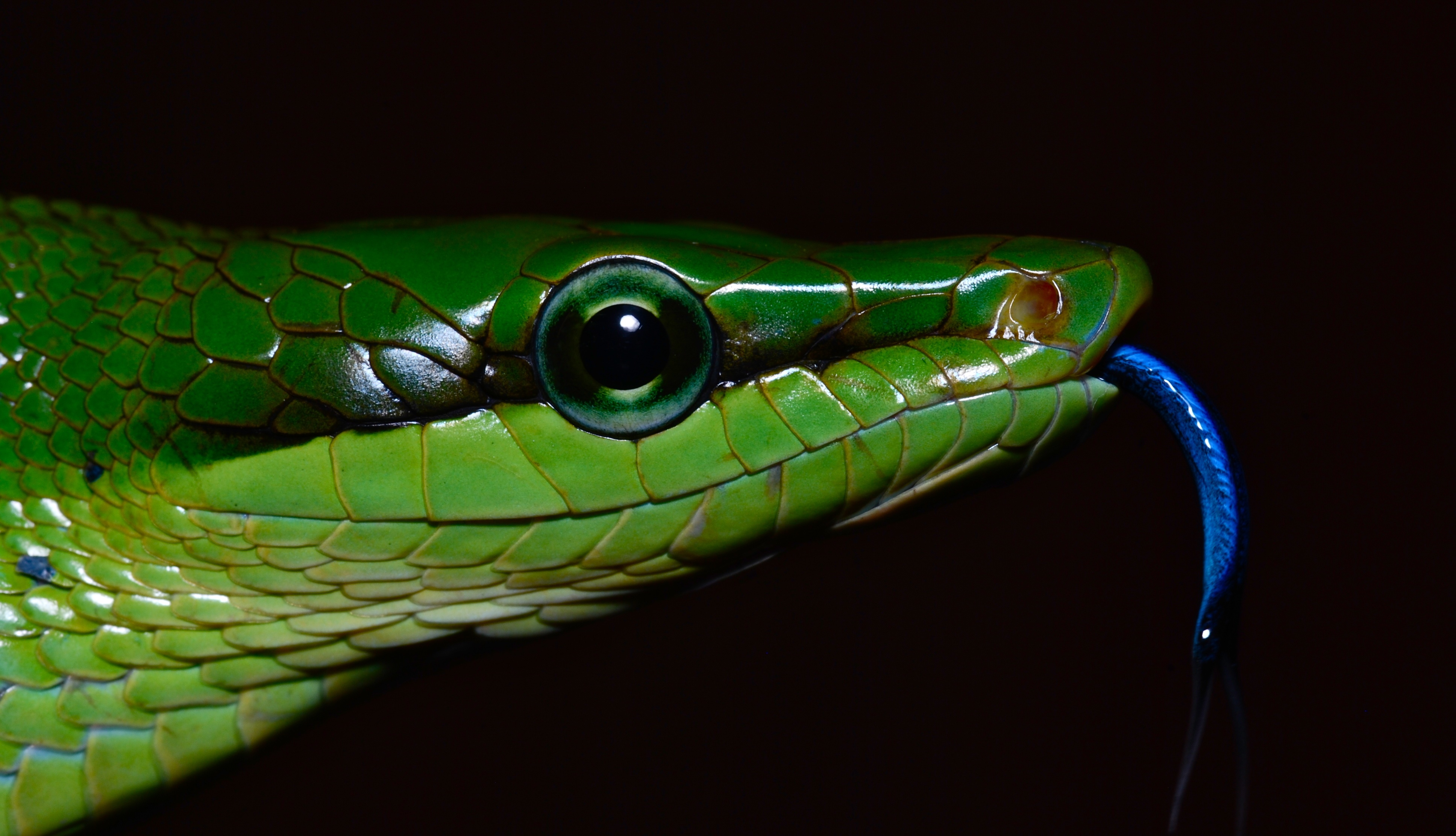
Showing the blue tongue

G. oxycephalum is a robust powerful snake, with wide smooth scales on its belly that are ideal for climbing trees and across branches. It has smaller, smooth scales on its back, which is usually bright green or light green and may have a black net-like pattern. A gray-colored morph with a yellow head exists in Panay, in the Philippines.

As some of its common names indicate, the snake has a green body with a red tail, but is usually brown. It also has a dark line horizontally across the eye. On the sides of its black tongue there may be brown and blue colour. The top of the head may be dark green, yellow-green, or yellow in colour.

The female can reach a length of up to 2.4 m (almost 8 feet), while the male is generally a little bit smaller but brighter in coloration.

== Behavior ==
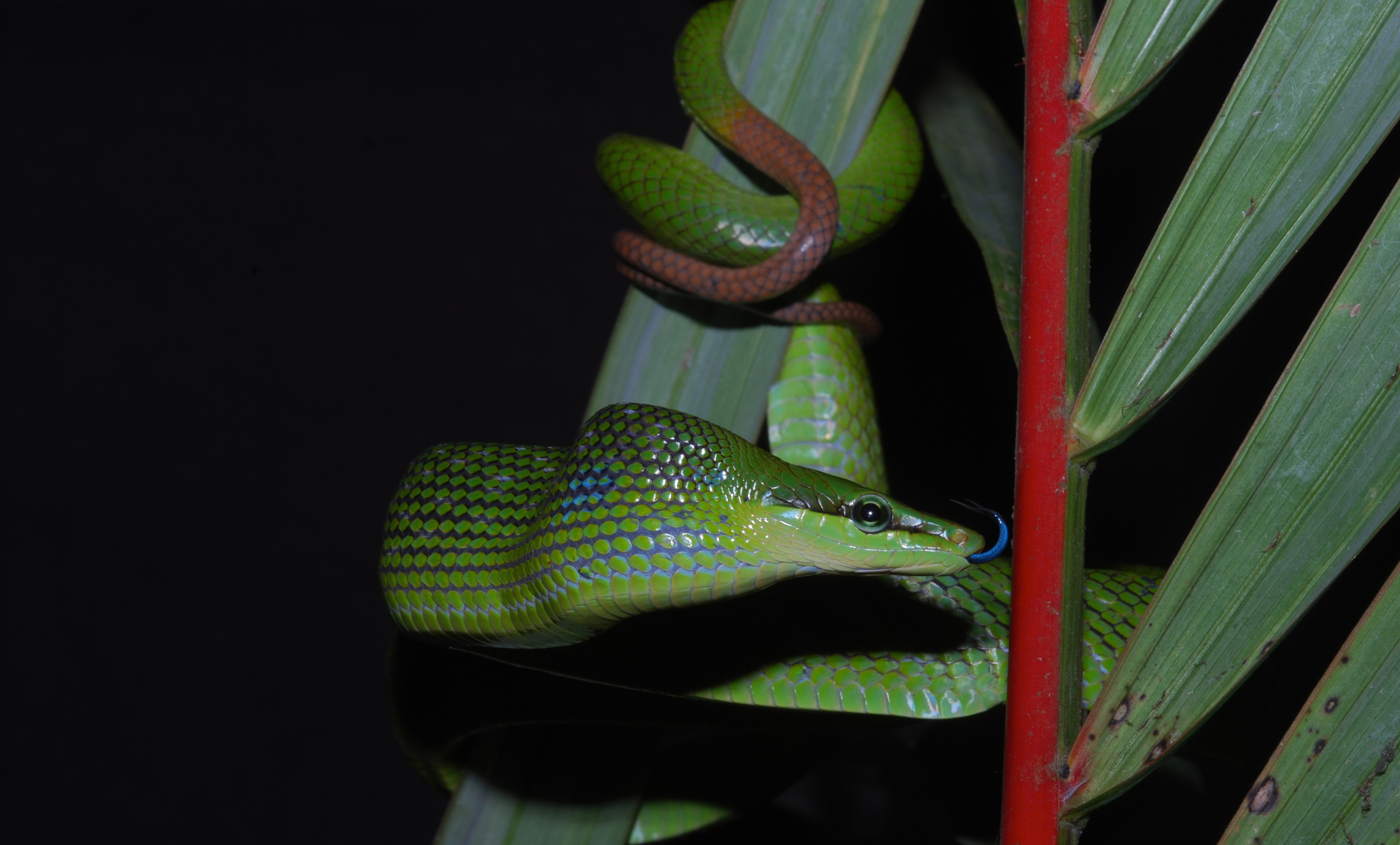
Showing defensive response

The red-tailed green ratsnake lives and spends its life in the trees and in cavities of trees. It seldom descends to the ground. When the snake is stressed, it may inflate a bag of air in its neck, making it appear larger in size.

In captivity, it has quite the "attitude" and may strike at or bite an unwary handler. Its temperament can be unpredictable and may change from time to time but an individual may become tame through proper handling.

== Diet ==
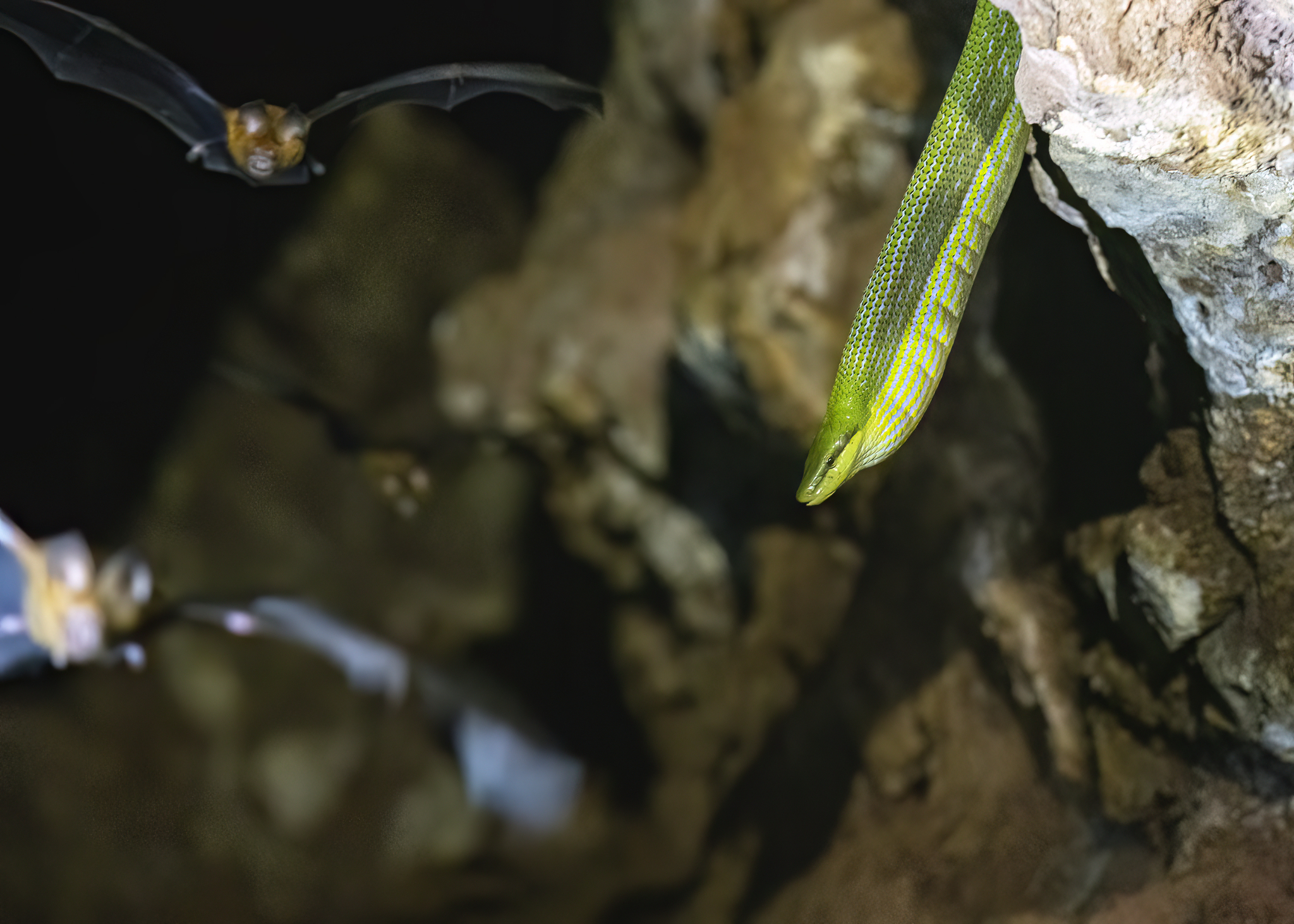
With grand roundleaf bats, in Vietnam

G. oxycephalum feeds almost exclusively on birds, bird eggs, lizards, and bats. It catches them in mid-air while hanging amongst branches. In captivity, it can be trained to feed on rodents such as mice and rats

== Reproduction ==
G. oxycephalum reaches sexually maturity at 4 years of age, and its eggs have a hatching time from 13 to 16 weeks. The female lays on average between 3 and 8 eggs usually between September and January and the hatchlings are about 45 cm (18 inches) long.

== Longevity ==
The average life span of G. oxycephalum in captivity is 20 years.

== Population ==
As of 2015, the red-tailed green ratsnake was categorized as least concern by the IUCN due to its relatively healthy population estimated at 15,000-20,000 individuals across its range. However, recent data as of 2022 indicates a decline in its numbers, with an estimated population of around 10,000-15,000. Despite this decline, it still retains its least status.

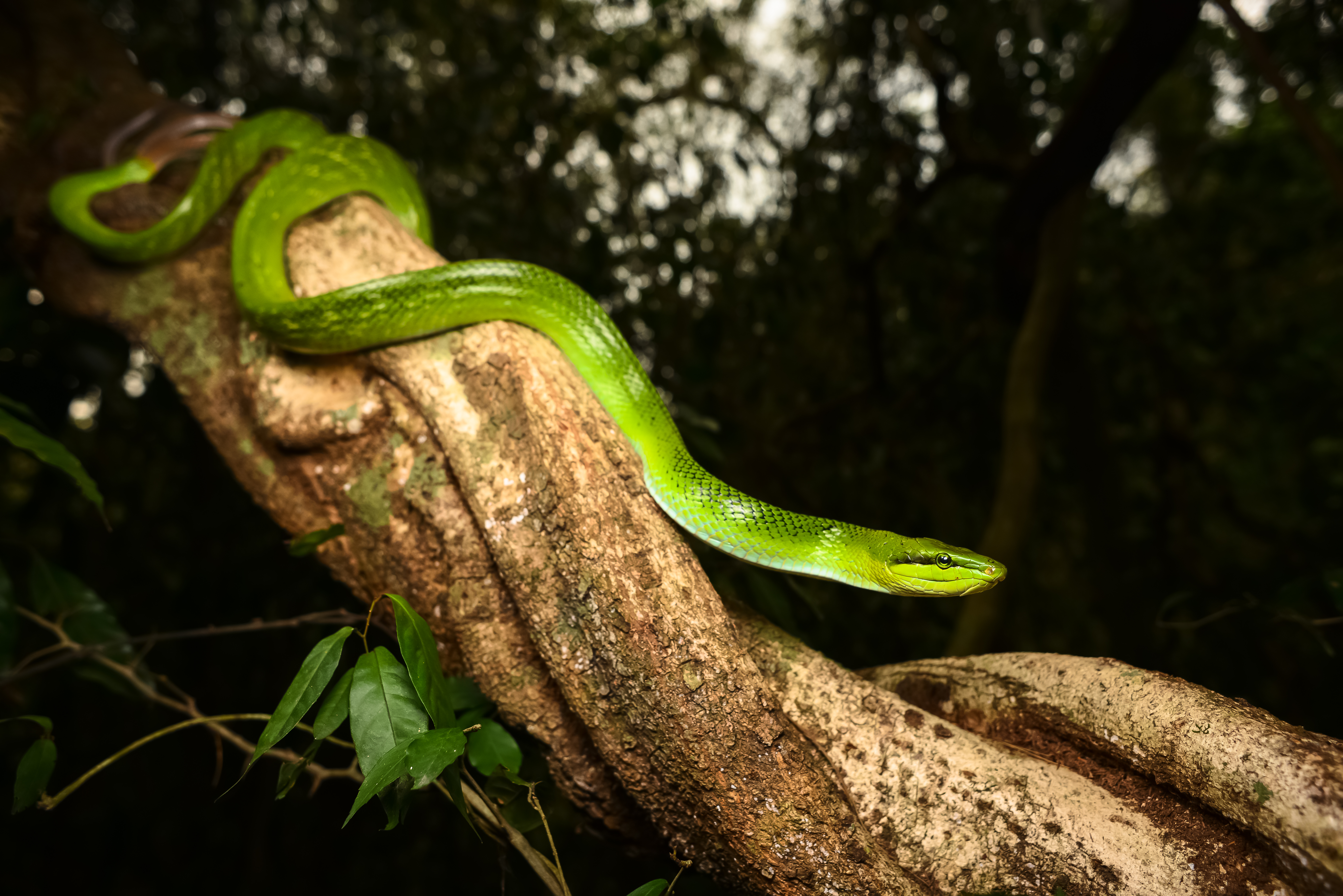
Gonyosoma oxycephalum, Kaeng Krachan National Park, Thailand

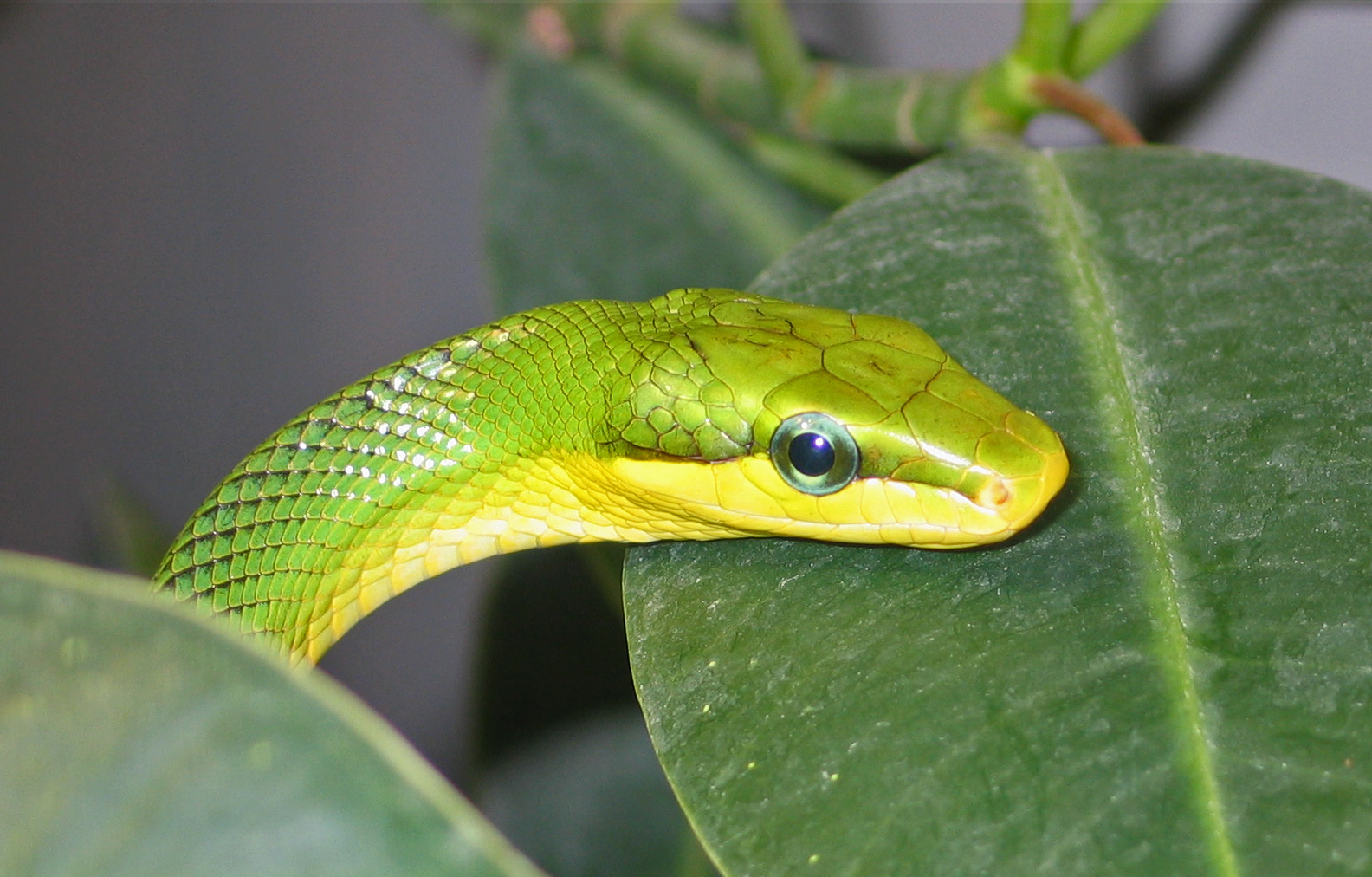
Gonyosoma oxycephalum

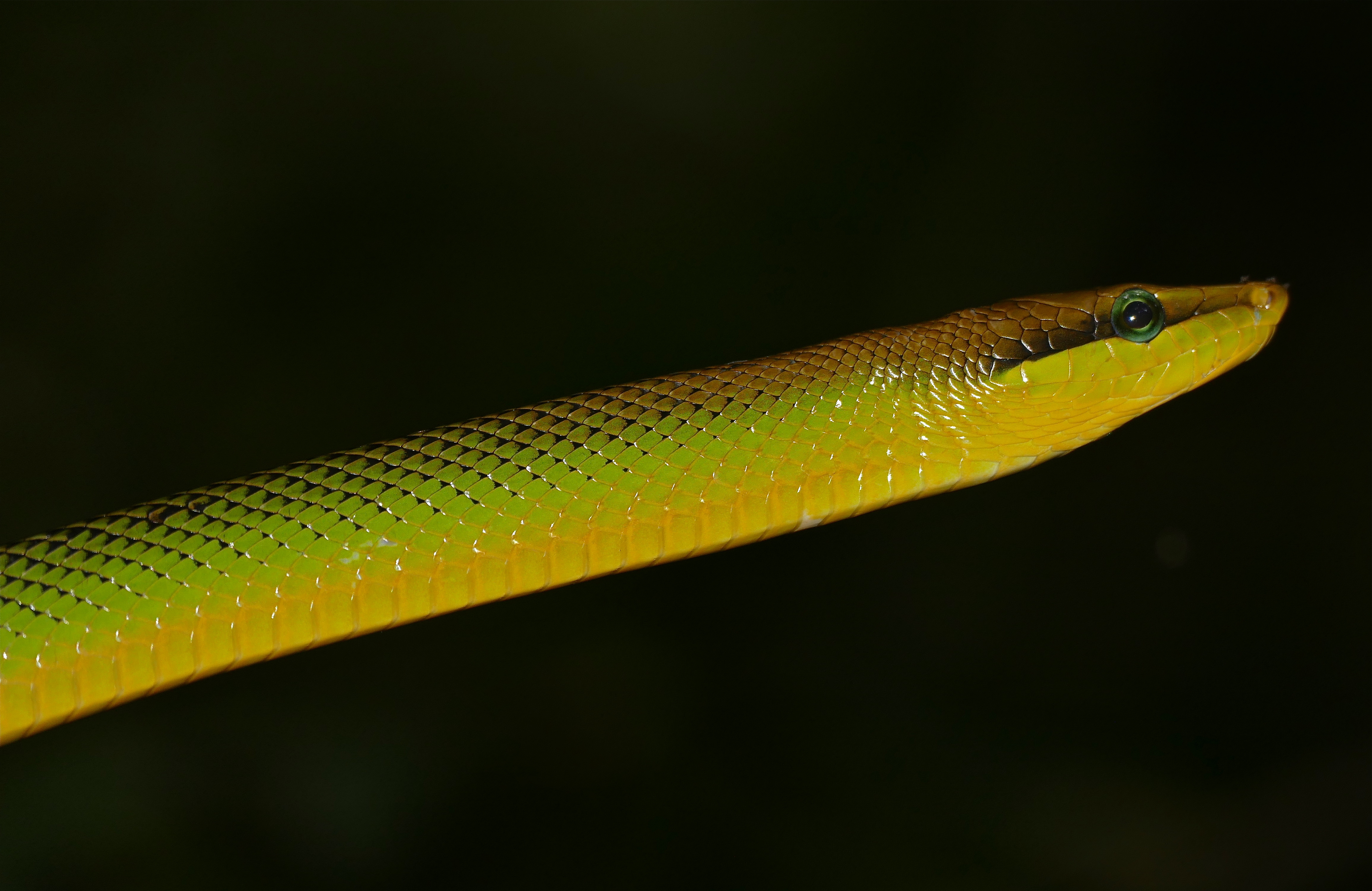
