= Xenophrys ancrae =

Conservation status
- Data Deficient (IUCN 3.1)

Scientific classification
- Kingdom: Animalia
- Phylum: Chordata
- Class: Amphibia
- Order: Anura
- Family: Megophryidae
- Genus: Xenophrys
- Species: X. ancrae

Binomial name
- Xenophrys ancrae (Mahony, Teeling & Biju, 2013)

Synonyms
- Megophrys ancrae Mahony, Teelin & Biju, 2013

Species of frog

Xenophrys ancrae is a species of frog in the family Megophryidae. Its type locality is Namdapha National Park and Tiger Reserve, Changlang District, Arunachal Pradesh, India.
