= Xenophrys megacephala =

Scientific classification
- Kingdom: Animalia
- Phylum: Chordata
- Class: Amphibia
- Order: Anura
- Family: Megophryidae
- Genus: Xenophrys
- Species: X. megacephala

Binomial name
- Xenophrys megacephala (Mahony, Sengupta, Kamei, and Biju, 2011)

Synonyms
- Megophrys megacephala Mahony, Sengupta, Kamei, and Biju, 2011

Species of frog

Xenophrys megacephala is a species of frog in the family Megophryidae from East Khasi Hills District, Meghalaya, India.
