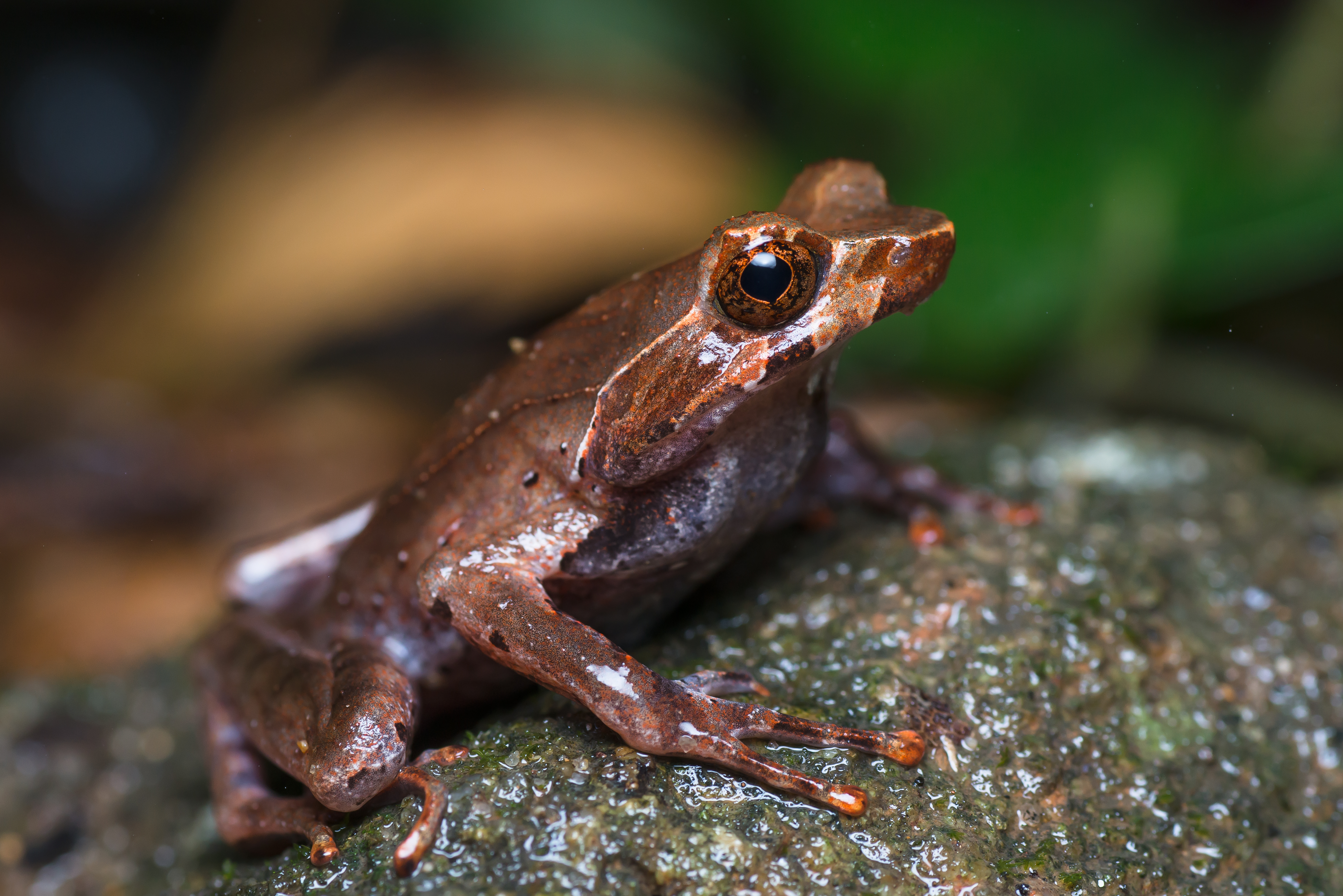
- In Khao Sok National Park, Thailand

Conservation status
- Least Concern (IUCN 3.1)

Scientific classification
- Kingdom: Animalia
- Phylum: Chordata
- Class: Amphibia
- Order: Anura
- Family: Megophryidae
- Genus: Xenophrys
- Species: X. longipes

Binomial name
- Xenophrys longipes (Boulenger, 1886)

Synonyms
- Megalophrys longipes Boulenger, 1886 "1885"; Megophrys longipes Boulenger, 1886

= Xenophrys longipes =

Species of frog

Xenophrys longipes is a species of frog in the family Megophryidae. It is also known as the Malacca spadefoot toad, red legged spine-eyed frog, red-legged horn frog, and slender-legged horned frog. It is found in the Malay Peninsula (Peninsular Malaysia and southern Thailand and Burma). Records from Cambodia and Vietnam are considered doubtful.

== Description ==
Male Xenophrys longipes grow to snout-vent length of 39–47 mm (1.5–1.9 in) and females to 49–65 mm (1.9–2.6 in). The body is relatively slender, as are the long hind legs. The tympanum is distinct. The dorsal skin is smooth but there are small warts on the flanks. The supratympanic fold is distinct and there are two pairs of delicate, oblique folds that converge posteriorly on the scapular region. The ventral surface is smooth. The dorsum is olive brown. There are oblique vertical dark bars on the sides of the head and a large triangular dark marking between the eyes. The limbs have dark cross-bars. The ventrum is pale reddish brown marbled and spotted with dark brown.

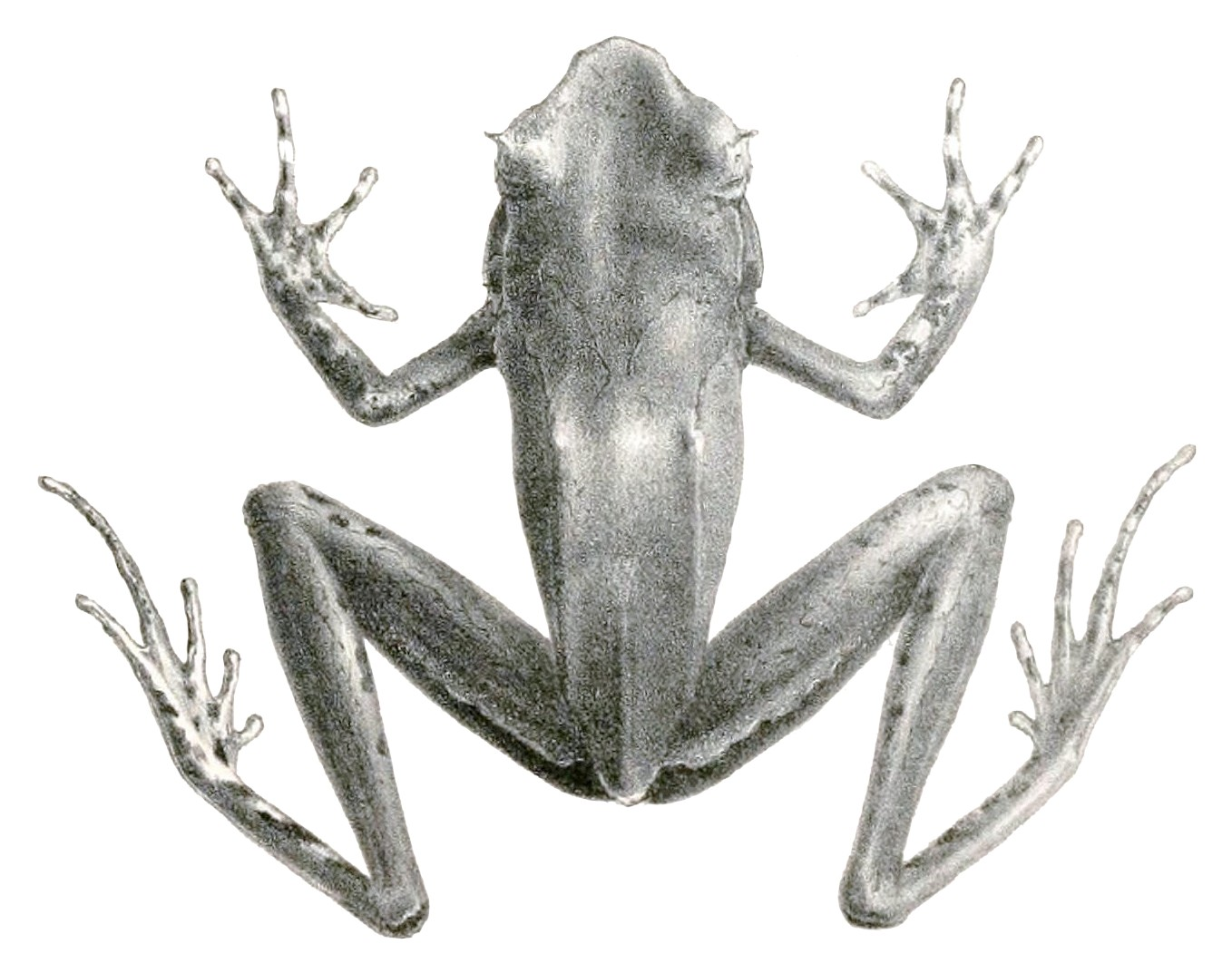
Illustration from the original species description published by George Albert Boulenger in 1886.

== Habitat and conservation ==
This species inhabits evergreen rainforests and montane moss forests. During the day they hide under rocks and logs, etc. The tadpoles live in streams.

Xenophrys longipes are uncommon even in prime habitat. They can be locally threatened by habitat loss (forest clearance).
