= Mangshan horned toad =

Conservation status
- Least Concern (IUCN 3.1)

Scientific classification
- Kingdom: Animalia
- Phylum: Chordata
- Class: Amphibia
- Order: Anura
- Family: Megophryidae
- Genus: Xenophrys
- Species: X. mangshanensis

Binomial name
- Xenophrys mangshanensis (Fei & Ye, 1990)

Synonyms
- Xenophrys mangshanensis Fei & Ye, 1990

Species of frog

The Mangshan horned toad (Xenophrys mangshanensis), or Mangshan spadefoot toad, is a species of frog in the family Megophryidae. It is endemic to China and known only from southern Hunan and northern Guangdong; its type locality is Mount Mang (Mangshan) in Yizhang County, Hunan. Its natural habitats are subtropical or tropical moist lowland forests, subtropical or tropical moist montane forests, and rivers. It is threatened by habitat loss.
