= Xenophrys vegrandis =

Conservation status
- Endangered (IUCN 3.1)

Scientific classification
- Kingdom: Animalia
- Phylum: Chordata
- Class: Amphibia
- Order: Anura
- Family: Megophryidae
- Genus: Xenophrys
- Species: X. vegrandis

Binomial name
- Xenophrys vegrandis (Mahony, Teeling & Biju, 2013)

Synonyms
- Megophrys vegrandis Mahony, Teeling & Biju, 2013

Species of frog

Xenophrys vegrandis is a species of frog in the family Megophryidae from West Kameng District, Arunachal Pradesh, India.
