= Xenophrys monticola =

Conservation status
- Least Concern (IUCN 3.1)

Scientific classification
- Kingdom: Animalia
- Phylum: Chordata
- Class: Amphibia
- Order: Anura
- Family: Megophryidae
- Genus: Xenophrys
- Species: X. monticola

Binomial name
- Xenophrys monticola Günther, 1864

Synonyms
- Megophrys katabhako Deuti, Grosjean, Nicolas, Vasudevan & Ohler, 2017; Megophrys sanu Deuti, Grosjean, Nicolas, Vasudevan & Ohler, 2017

Species of frog

Xenophrys monticola is a species of frog in the family Megophryidae. It is known from West Bengal and Sikkim, India, as well as Nepal and possibly Bhutan.
