= Xenophrys maosonensis =

Scientific classification
- Kingdom: Animalia
- Phylum: Chordata
- Class: Amphibia
- Order: Anura
- Family: Megophryidae
- Genus: Xenophrys
- Species: X. maosonensis

Binomial name
- Xenophrys maosonensis (Bourret, 1937)

Species of frog

Xenophrys maosonensis, commonly known as the Maoson horned toad, is a species of frog in the Megophryidae family found in Vietnam and southern China. Their known range is as far south as the Tam Đảo mountain range in Vietnam, and as far north as the Yunnan–Guizhou Plateau in China.

== Description ==
Xenophrys maosonensis is a medium to large species of frog with a weak medial projection above its eyes. Adult males have snout-to-vent length of 6.6 cm, while the females are notably larger at 7.7 cm. The species is characterized by a relatively broad head noticeably broad compared to the body, and a large mouth extending the width of its head to the tympanum. The tympanum is distinct, and sits just above the shoulder. The iris is copper-orange with a black vertical pupil outlined by reddish brown. The upper lip is bordered by an irregular cream-colored line, with a prominent black mask from the snout to the upper-shoulder behind the tympanum. The black band is lined at the top with a distinct white border. The body is reddish to gray with irregular tubercles.

The head has a distinct triangle/arrow pattern pointing to the rear. The dorsum has a variable "X" or "Y" pattern. The flanks are specked with yellow to orange tubercles under a single dorsolateral fold. Venter skin is smooth and coloration is cream to yellow with white spots bordered by gray or black. Limbs are short and robust. The toes on the hind-limbs are slightly webbed.

== Habitat ==
The species is a montane frog that can be found at elevations between 1,000 meters and 1,900 meters. They live in permanently damp substrate along rivers and streams. Xenophrys maosonensis are ambush predators with a diest consisting of invertebrates, small rodents, lizards, and even other frogs.
