= Xenophrys damrei =

Conservation status
- Critically Endangered (IUCN 3.1)

Scientific classification
- Kingdom: Animalia
- Phylum: Chordata
- Class: Amphibia
- Order: Anura
- Family: Megophryidae
- Genus: Xenophrys
- Species: X. damrei

Binomial name
- Xenophrys damrei (Mahony, 2011)

Synonyms
- Megophrys damrei Mahony, 2011

Species of amphibian

Xenophrys damrei is a species of megophryid toad endemic to Cambodia. It is only known from its type locality, Bokor Plateau in the Dâmrei Mountains of southern Cambodia. The species description was published in 2011 but was based on samples collected by Malcolm Arthur Smith in 1914. The species has not been observed in surveys ever since, although this might reflect seasonal variability. The known specimens measure 69 mm (2.7 in) (female, holotype ) and 57 mm (2.2 in) (male, paratype) in snout–vent length.
