= Xenophrys truongsonensis =

- Xenophrys truongsonensis

Scientific classification
- Kingdom: Animalia
- Phylum: Chordata
- Class: Amphibia
- Order: Anura
- Family: Megophryidae
- Genus: Xenophrys
- Species: X. truongsonensis

Binomial name
- Xenophrys truongsonensis Luong, Hoang, Pham, Nguyen, Orlov, Ziegler & Nguyen, 2022

Synonyms
- Megophrys sp. 12 (Chen et al., 2017); Megophrys cf. maosoensis (Mahony et al., 2018)

Species of frog

Xenophrys truongsonensis, commonly known as the Truong Son horned frog, is a species of frog in the Megophryidae family found in Vietnam. They are native to the southern and central part of the Annamite mountain range (Truong Son Mountains) of Vietnam and Laos.

== Description ==
Xenophrys truongsonensis is a medium to large horned frog with a broad head featuring pointed horns above their eyes. Adult males reach 5.8-7.1 cm, while females are larger at 6.5-8.7 cm. The iris is copper-orange with a black pupil outline in reddish-brown. Eyes are dark brown to red in color. The head is noticeably broad compared to the body, with a large mouth extending to the tympanum. A copper-colored line runs along the lip, bordered by an irregular cream-colored line above. A prominent black band runs the length of the head starting at the nose, past the eye, and to the back of the head extending beyond the tympanum. This band is bordered by a thin cream-colored line. Arms and legs are mottled with patches of black, copper-red and cream coloration for camouflage. The top of the head and dorsal coloration is gray, mottled with red and copper specks. The limbs are short and robust. A dorsolateral fold runs the length of the back on each side of the frog. Dorsum is randomly scattered with tubercles. Slight webbing on the base of the toes.

== Habitat ==
This species is a montane frog found at elevations of roughly 980 m above sea level. Lives on permanently damp forest floors near rivers or streams. They are a sit-and-wait predator, with a diet typically consisting of spiders and other invertebrates, small rodents, lizards, and even other frogs.
