= Xenophrys robusta =

Conservation status
- Least Concern (IUCN 3.1)

Scientific classification
- Kingdom: Animalia
- Phylum: Chordata
- Class: Amphibia
- Order: Anura
- Family: Megophryidae
- Genus: Xenophrys
- Species: X. robusta

Binomial name
- Xenophrys robusta (Boulenger, 1908)

Synonyms
- Megalophrys robusta (Boulenger, 1908); Megophrys robusta Boulenger, 1908

Species of amphibian

Xenophrys robusta, commonly known as the Bengal spadefoot toad, robust spadefoot toad, or white-lipped horned toad, is a species of toad found in eastern Nepal and north-eastern India. It is associated with riparian vegetation in tropical moist forests.
