= Gonyosoma margaritatum =

Conservation status
- Least Concern (IUCN 3.1)

Scientific classification
- Kingdom: Animalia
- Phylum: Chordata
- Class: Reptilia
- Order: Squamata
- Suborder: Serpentes
- Family: Colubridae
- Genus: Gonyosoma
- Species: G. margaritatum

Binomial name
- Gonyosoma margaritatum Peters, 1871
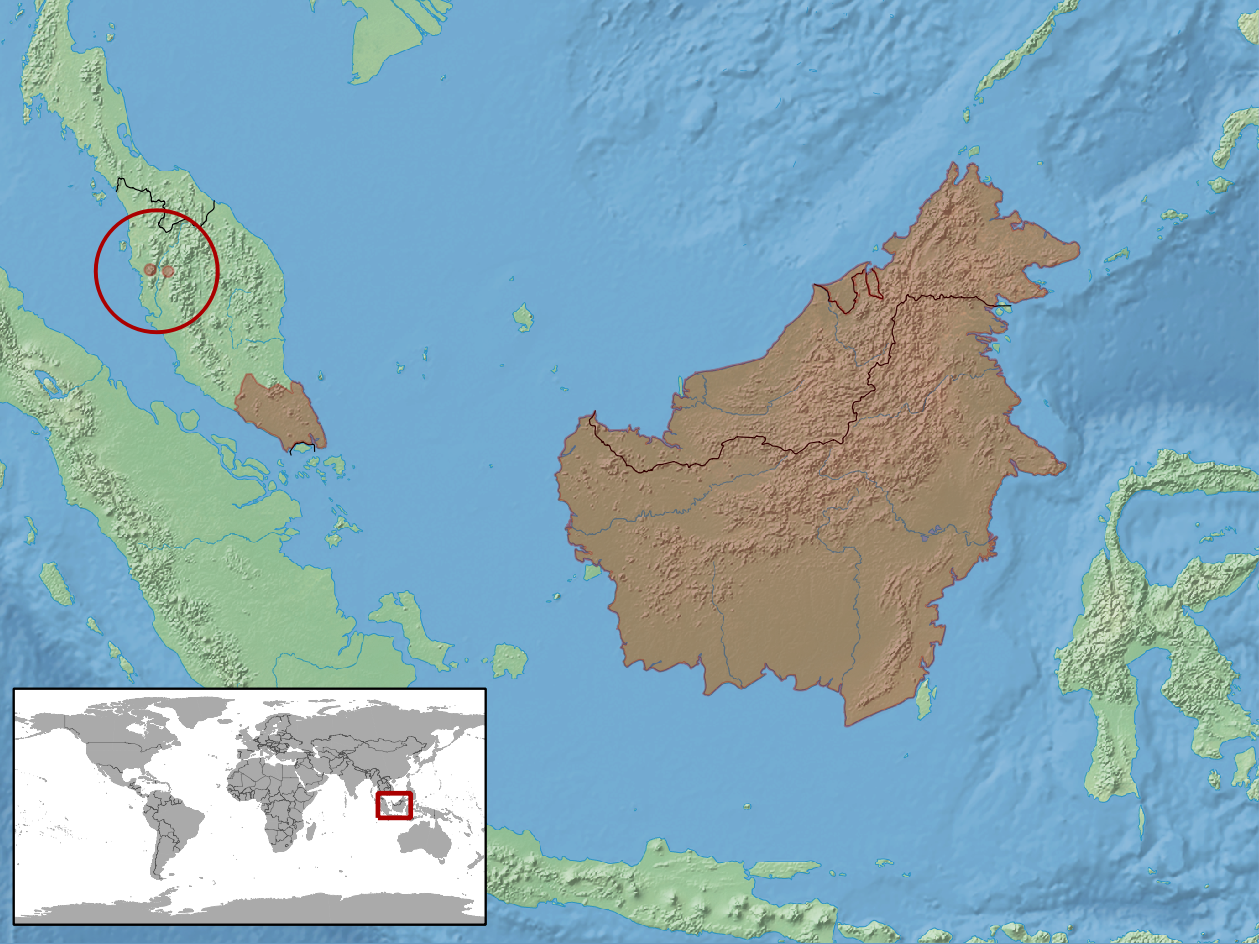

Synonyms
- Gonyophis margaritatus (Peters, 1871)

Species of snake

Gonyosoma margaritatum, commonly known as the rainbow tree snake and royal tree snake, is a species of snake of the family Colubridae.

== Geographic range ==
The snake is found in Malaysia and Singapore.
