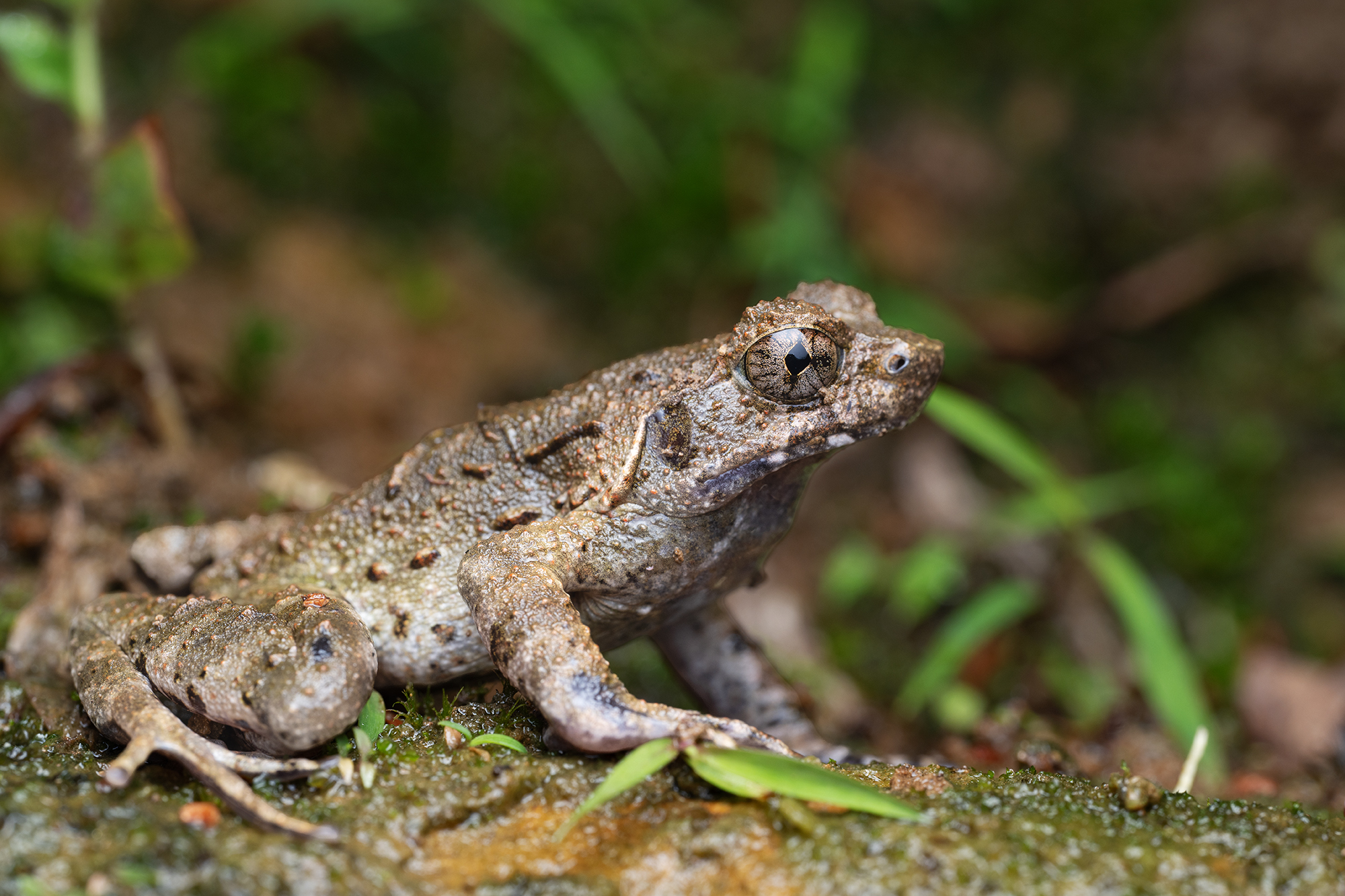

Conservation status
- Least Concern (IUCN 3.1)

Scientific classification
- Kingdom: Animalia
- Phylum: Chordata
- Class: Amphibia
- Order: Anura
- Family: Megophryidae
- Genus: Xenophrys
- Species: X. serchhipii

Binomial name
- Xenophrys serchhipii Mathew and Sen, 2007

Synonyms
- Megophrys serchhipii Mathew and Sen, 2007

= Xenophrys serchhipii =

Species of frog

Xenophrys serchhipii is a species of frog in the family Megophryidae, known from a single specimen from Serchhip, Mizoram, India.
