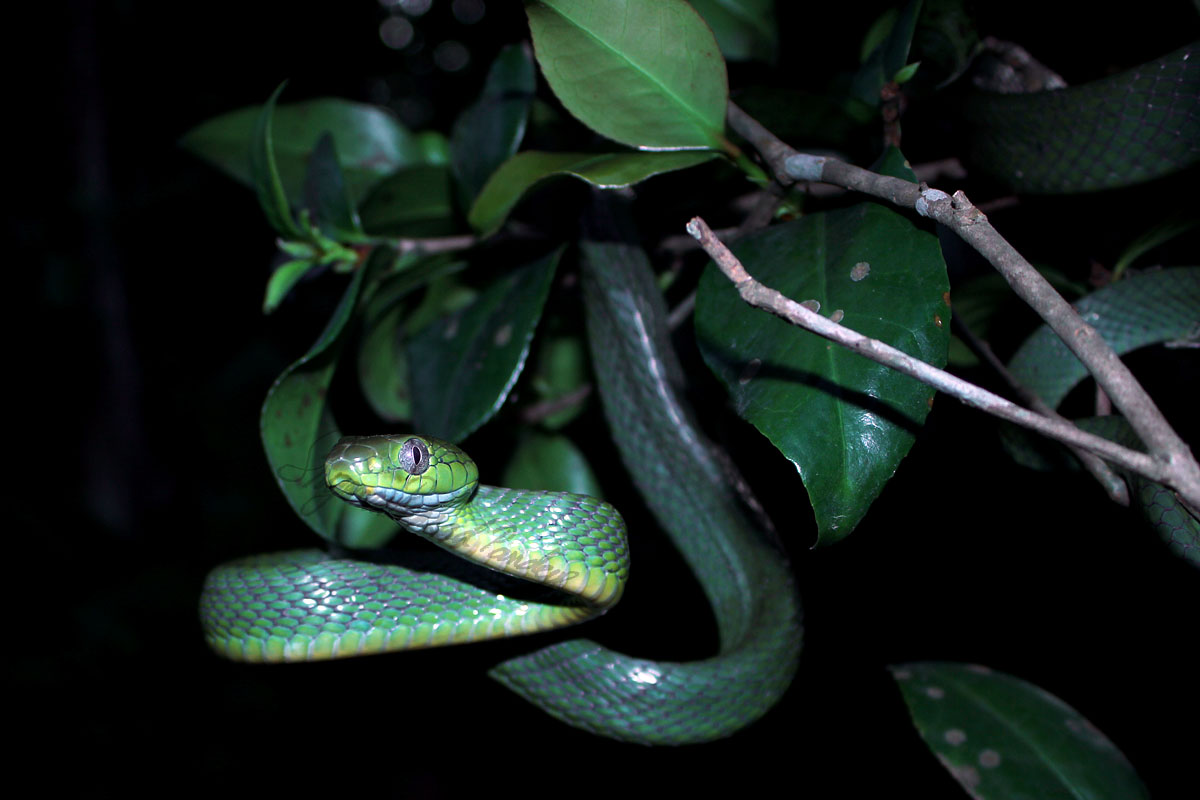

Conservation status
- Least Concern (IUCN 3.1)

Scientific classification
- Kingdom: Animalia
- Phylum: Chordata
- Class: Reptilia
- Order: Squamata
- Suborder: Serpentes
- Family: Colubridae
- Genus: Boiga
- Species: B. cyanea

Binomial name
- Boiga cyanea (Duméril, Bibron & Duméril, 1854)

Synonyms
- Triglyphodon cyaneum Duméril, Bibron & Duméril, 1854; Dipsas cyanea Jan, 1863; Dipsadomorphus cyaneus Boulenger, 1896

= Boiga cyanea =

Green cat snake

Species of snake

Boiga cyanea, commonly known as the green cat snake, is a colubrid snake species found in South Asia, China and South-east Asia.

== Description ==
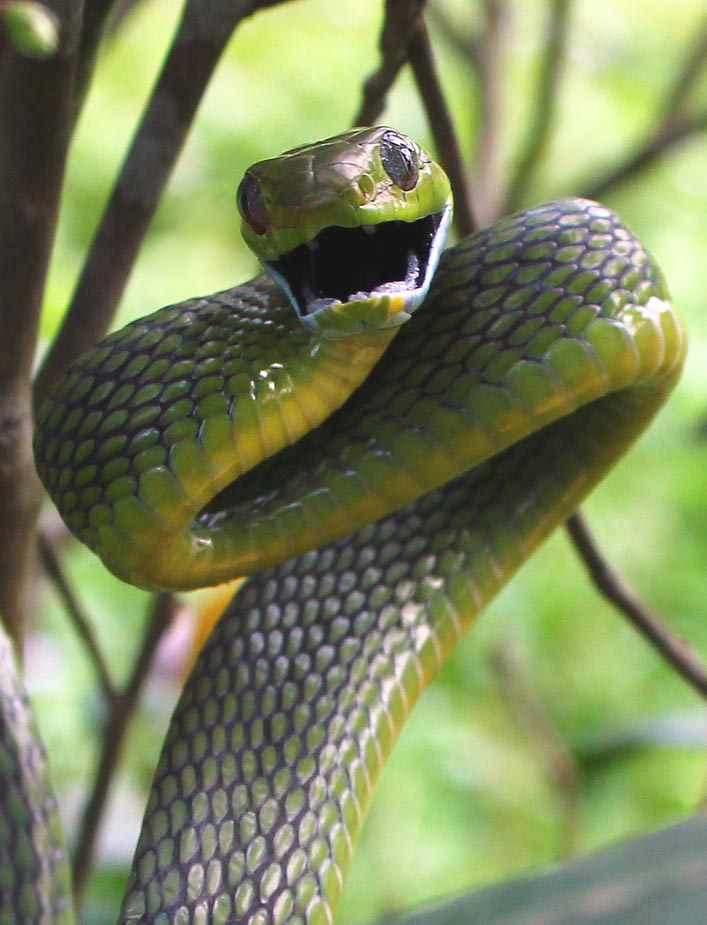
Defensive posture

Medium to large in length, slightly compressed, medium bodied snake with a moderately long tail. Head distinct from narrow neck with a rounded snout. Eyes large in size with vertically elliptical pupils. Dorsal scales smooth with single or double apical pits. Ventrals with a feeble lateral keels. Dorsal scale count usually 21 - 21 ( 23 ) - 15. Its long prehensile tail makes it purely arboreal.

Dorsal color uniform green or green mixed with grayish or bluish. Belly color greenish or yellowish white. Top of the head usually similar to dorsal color or sometimes of brownish tint. Upper lip color yellowish; most of head scaled margined with black. Eyes golden brown. Hatchlings are reddish brown with a green head. The color of the hatchlings starts to change after 8–9 months of age.

Length: Maximum: 190 cm. Common: 115 cm. (SVL. 87 cm.)

== Distribution ==
The green cat snake found in Bangladesh, Bhutan, Cambodia, China (Yunnan- part), India (Sikkim, Darjeeling & Jalpaiguri, West Bengal, Assam, Arunachal Pradesh, Andaman & Nicobar Islands), Laos, Malaysia (West), Myanmar, Nepal, Thailand (incl. Phuket) and Vietnam.

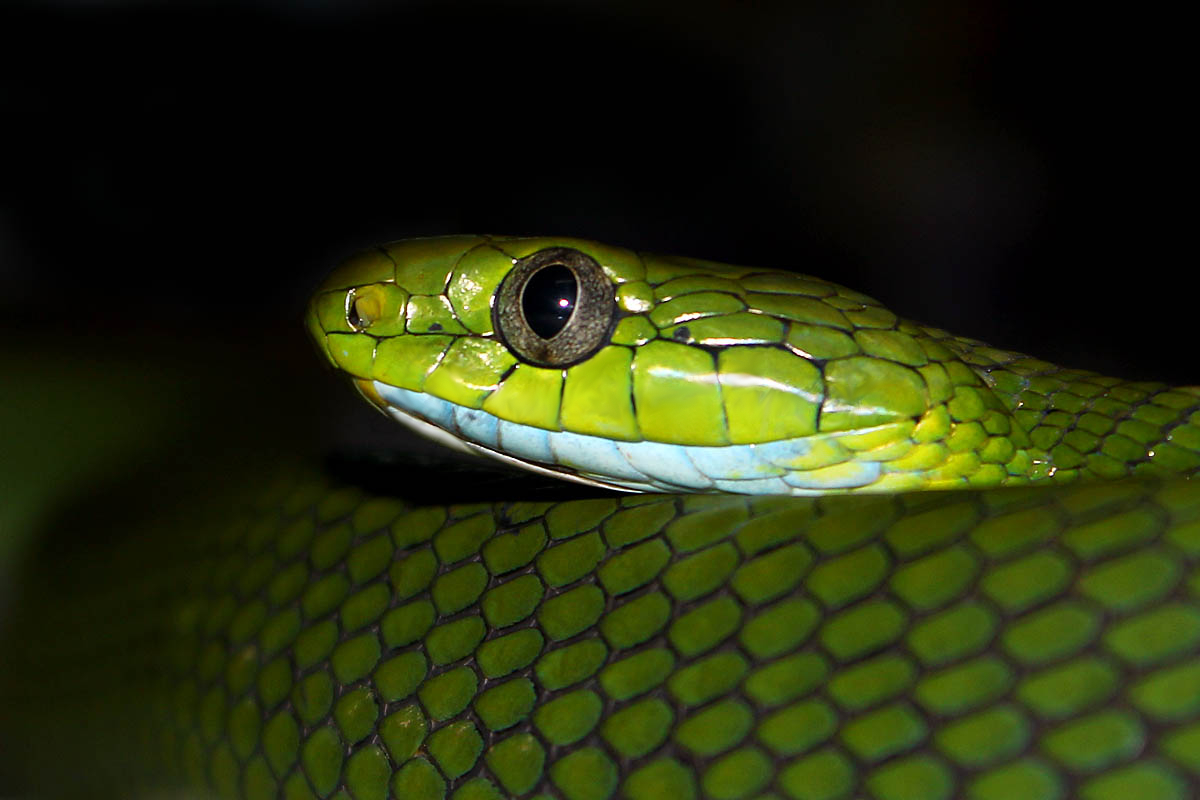

== Ecology ==
Habitat: Terrestrial & arboreal; inhabits primary and secondary forests, including montane zones, and can also be found at sea level in coastal forests.

Habit: Nocturnal. Occasionally seen on the ground searching for prey. Very mild disposition, sluggish, and makes no attempt to escape when approached or when handled. Difficult to provoke into striking. By day stays coiled up amongst tree branches, but by night actively hunts for prey.

Diet: Carnivorous; feeds mainly on lizards. Also takes frogs, birds, rodents and also other snakes. This rear fanged & mildly venomous snake can paralyze small prey. If threatened, it will become hostile and posture with a wide open mouth.

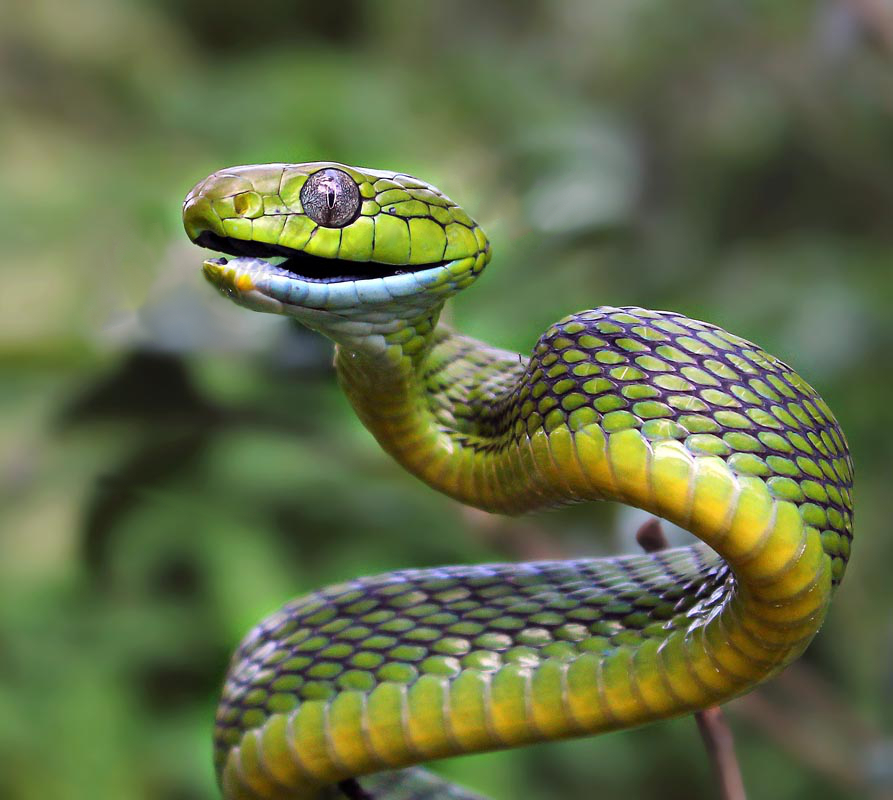
B. cyanea near Gorumara National Park

Reproduction: Oviparous; Eggs are laid approximately 42–50 days after mating and lays 7-14 eggs from late Winters to late Summers; incubation period approximately 85 days.

== Medical significance ==
Bites by this species not expected to cause medically significant effects and the only risk, probably small, local secondary infection. Patients presenting with bites by these snakes do not require medical attention, other than to check for infection and ensure tetanus immune status. Patients should be advised to return if local symptoms develop, suggesting secondary infection. Bites unlikely to cause more than mild to moderate local swelling & pain, occasionally local bruising, paresthesia/numbness, erythema or bleeding, but no necrosis and no systemic effects. While most cases will be minor, not requiring admission, some cases will be more severe, requiring admission and treatment, so assess carefully before early discharge.
