= Cyrtodactylus aaronbaueri =

Scientific classification
- Kingdom: Animalia
- Phylum: Chordata
- Class: Reptilia
- Order: Squamata
- Suborder: Gekkota
- Family: Gekkonidae
- Genus: Cyrtodactylus
- Species: C. aaronbaueri

Binomial name
- Cyrtodactylus aaronbaueri Purkayastha, Lalremsanga, Bohra, Biakzuala, Decemson, Muansanga, Vabeiryureilai, & Rathee, 2021

Species of lizard

Cyrtodactylus aaronbaueri is a species of gecko endemic to India.
