= Cyrtodactylus lungleiensis =

Scientific classification
- Kingdom: Animalia
- Phylum: Chordata
- Class: Reptilia
- Order: Squamata
- Suborder: Gekkota
- Family: Gekkonidae
- Genus: Cyrtodactylus
- Species: C. lungleiensis

Binomial name
- Cyrtodactylus lungleiensis Lalremsanga, Chinliansiama, Chandra Bohra, Biakzuala, Vabeiryureilai, Muansanga, Malsawmdawngliana, Hmar, DeCemson, Siammawii, Das, & Purkayastha, 2022

Species of lizard

Cyrtodactylus lungleiensis is a species of gecko, a lizard in the family Gekkonidae. The species is endemic to India.
