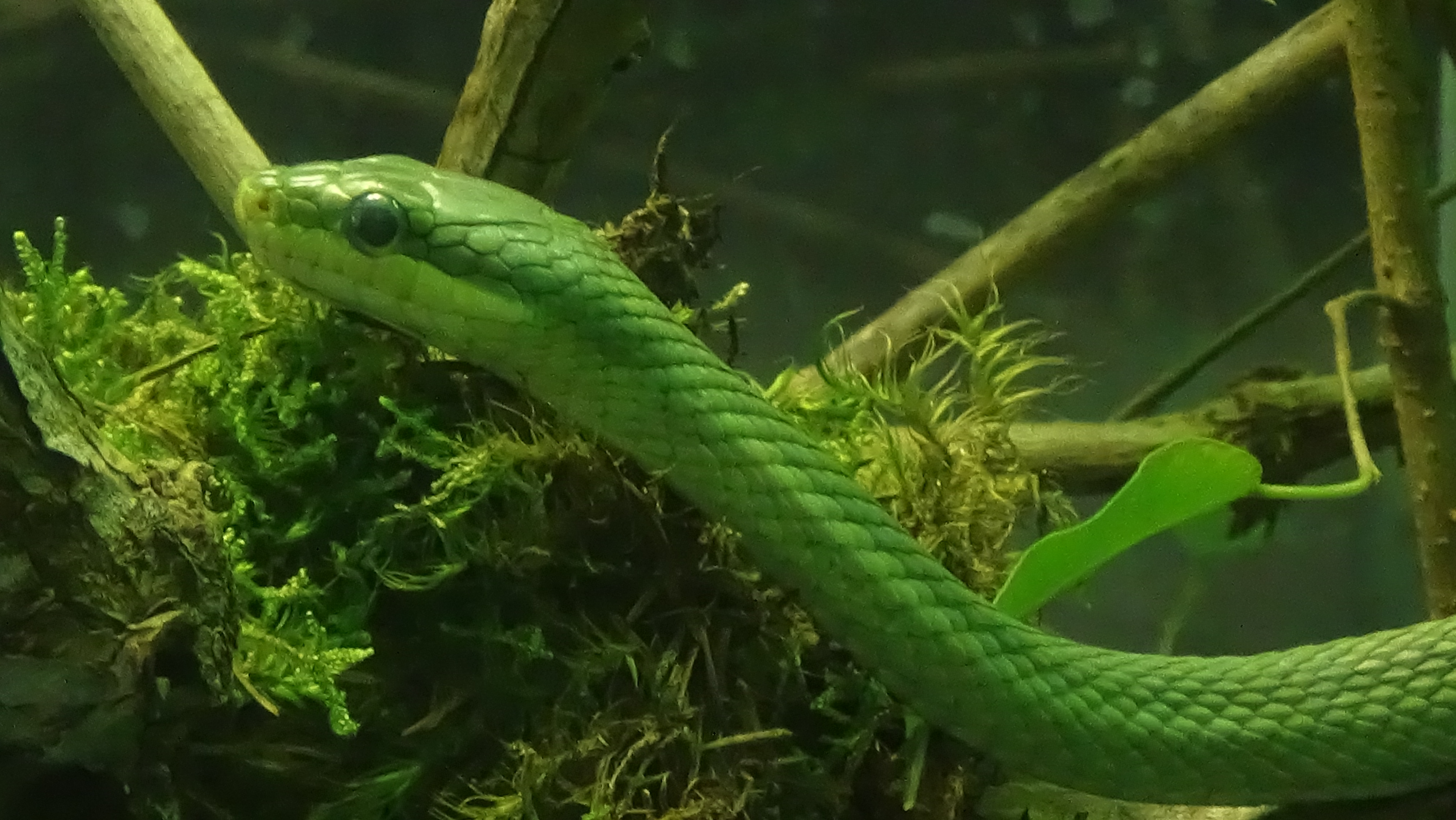

Conservation status
- Least Concern (IUCN 3.1)

Scientific classification
- Kingdom: Animalia
- Phylum: Chordata
- Class: Reptilia
- Order: Squamata
- Suborder: Serpentes
- Family: Colubridae
- Genus: Gonyosoma
- Species: G. prasinum

Binomial name
- Gonyosoma prasinum (Blyth, 1854)

Synonyms
- Coluber prasinus Blyth, 1854; Rhadinophis prasinus (Blyth, 1854); Rhynchophis prasinus (Blyth, 1854); Gonyosoma gramineum Günther, 1864

= Gonyosoma prasinum =

Green trinket snake

Species of snake

Gonyosoma prasinum (green trinket snake, green bush rat snake or green ratsnake) is a species of colubrid snake found in Asia.

== Description ==
Rostral a little broader than deep, just visible from above; suture between the internasals a little shorter than that between the prefrontals; frontal as long as its distance from the end of the snout, shorter than the parietals; loreal square or longer than deep; one or two preoculars; temporals 1+2 or 2+2; upper labials 9, fourth, fifth, and sixth entering the eye; 5 lower labials in contact with the anterior chin-shields, which are as long as the posterior or a little longer. Scales in 19 rows, the 9 to 11 middle rows feebly keeled m the adult, smooth in the young. Ventrals with a lateral keel, 198 to 206; anal entire or divided; subcaudals 100–107. Uniform bright green above; upper lip and lower surface yellowish or greenish white. Total length 3 feet: tail 9 inches.

== Distribution ==
Its habitat ranges include Bangladesh, India (Darjeeling, Assam, Arunachal Pradesh, Tripura, Myanmar, northern Thailand, western Malaysia, Laos, Vietnam, China (Yunnan, Guizhou and Hainan) and Philippines.
