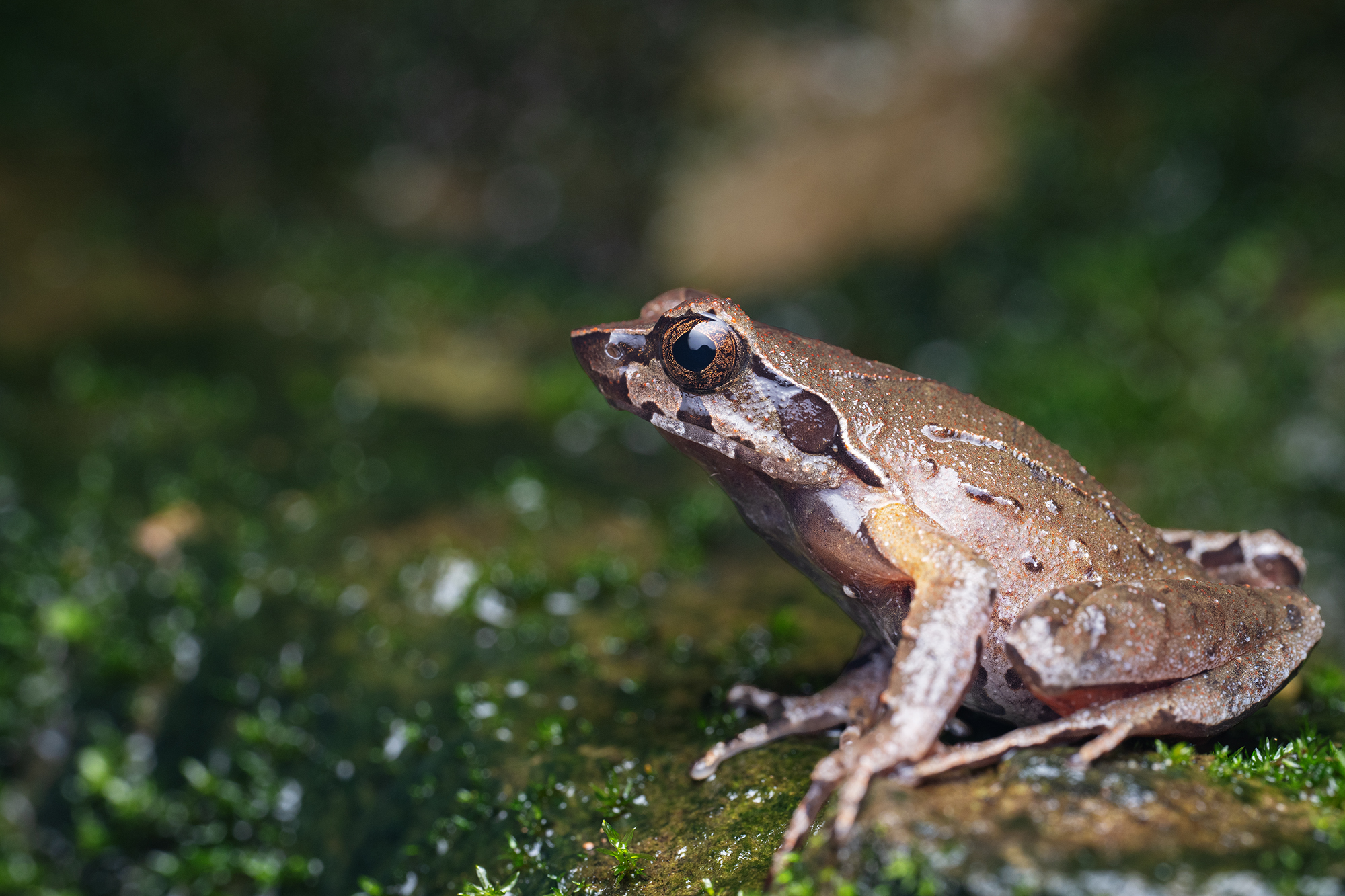

Conservation status
- Vulnerable (IUCN 3.1)

Scientific classification
- Kingdom: Animalia
- Phylum: Chordata
- Class: Amphibia
- Order: Anura
- Family: Megophryidae
- Genus: Xenophrys
- Species: X. awuh

Binomial name
- Xenophrys awuh (Mahony, Kamei, Teeling, and Biju, 2020)

Synonyms
- Megophrys awuh (Mahony, Kamei, Teeling, and Biju, 2020)

= Xenophrys awuh =

Species of frog

Xenophrys awuh, the Naga hills horned frog, is a species of frog belonging to the Xenophrys genus. It is found in an elevation range of 1,650 to 2,220 m (5,410 to 7,280 ft). It is endemic to India and Myanmar, and was first described in 2020.
