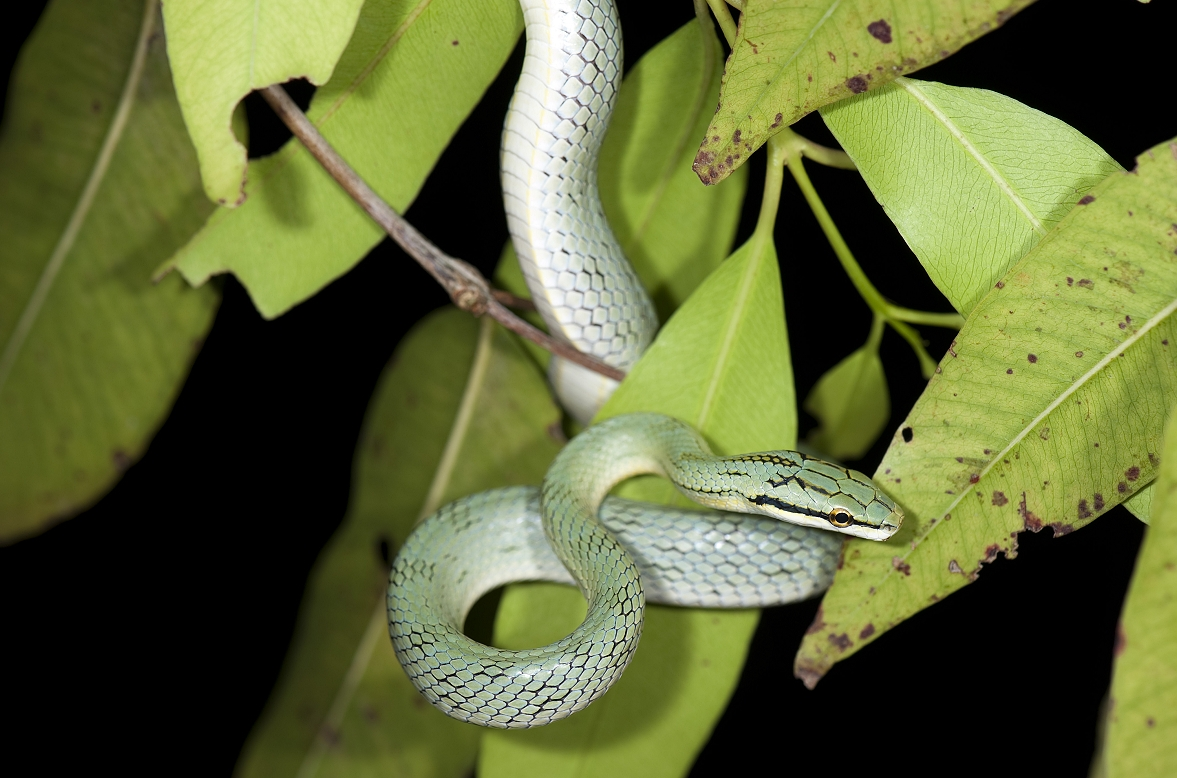

Conservation status
- Least Concern (IUCN 3.1)

Scientific classification
- Kingdom: Animalia
- Phylum: Chordata
- Class: Reptilia
- Order: Squamata
- Suborder: Serpentes
- Family: Colubridae
- Genus: Gonyosoma
- Species: G. frenatum

Binomial name
- Gonyosoma frenatum (Gray, 1853)

Synonyms
- Herpetodryas frenatus Gray, 1853; Gonyosoma frenatum – Günther, 1858; Coluber frenatus – Boulenger, 1890; Elaphe frenata – Smith, 1943

= Gonyosoma frenatum =

Species of snake

Gonyosoma frenatum, common name Khasi Hills trinket snake, is a species of colubrid snake found in north-eastern India, southern China, Taiwan, and Vietnam.

== Description ==
Gonyosoma frenatum reaches roughly 84 cm (2 feet 9 inches) in body length, with a 24 cm (9.5 inch) tail. They are uniform bright green above with a black streak along each side of the head, passing through the eye. The upper lip and lower parts are pale green and they have a whitish ventral keel.

They have a subacuminate snout twice as long as its eye, obliquely truncated and projecting. Its rostral is a little broader than deep and hardly visible from above. The suture between the internasals is much shorter than that between the prefrontals. The frontal is as long as its distance from the end of the snout, shorter than the parietals, with no loreal. The prefrontal is in contact with the labials. It has one large preocular, two post-oculars with temporals 2+2 or 2+3 and 9 (or 8) upper labials, fourth, fifth, and sixth entering the eye. Five lower labials are in contact with the anterior chin-shields, which are as long as the posterior. Scales are in 19 rows, dorsals faintly keeled. Ventrals have a lateral keel, 203–204, anal divided; subcaudals 120–121.

== Distribution ==
- NE India (Assam, Arunachal Pradesh)
- S China (to SW Sichuan; Fujian, Guangdong, Anhui, Guangxi, Guizhou, Zhejiang)
- Taiwan
- North Vietnam

Type locality: India: Khasi Hills (Gray, 1853)
