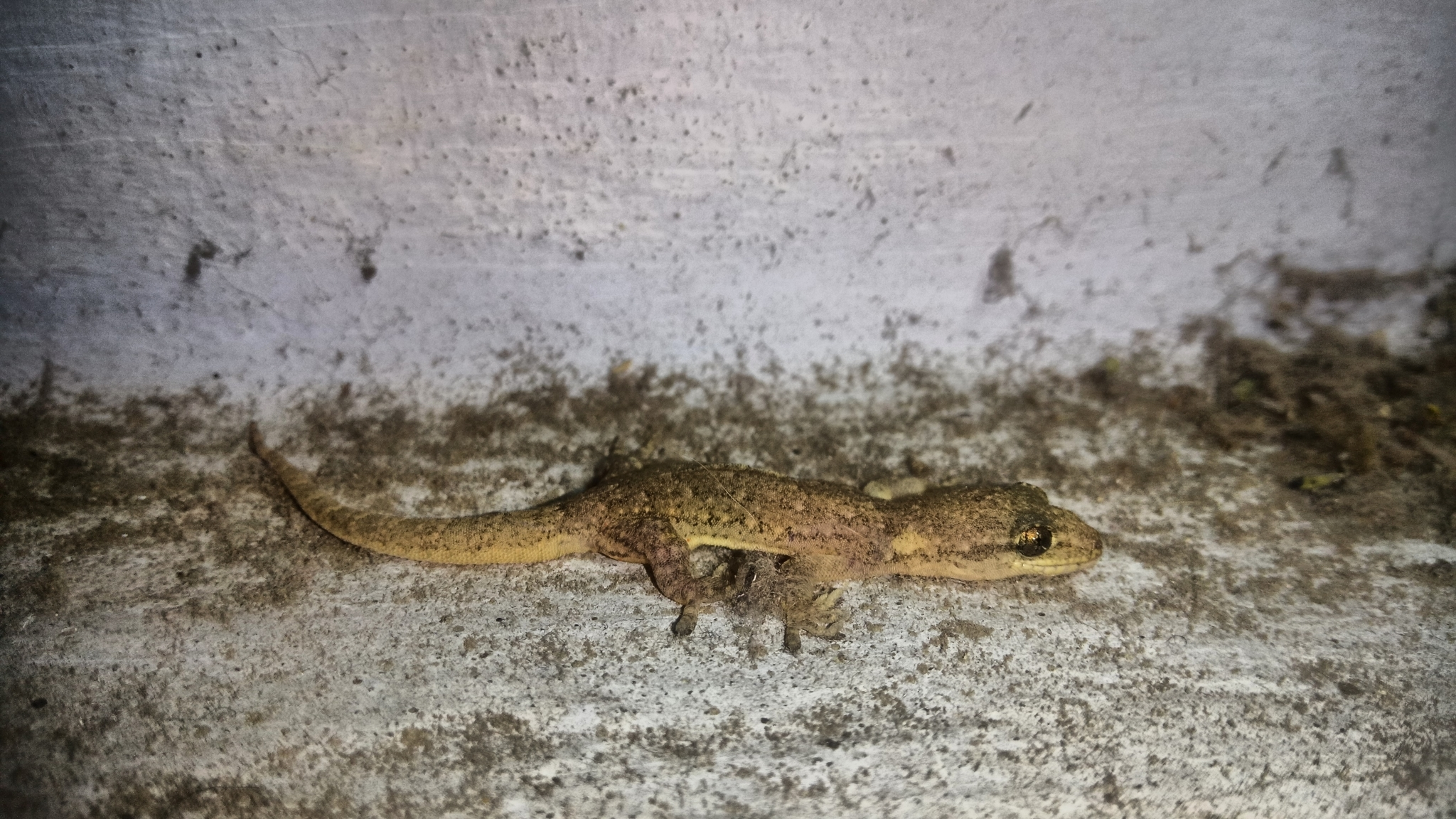

Scientific classification
- Kingdom: Animalia
- Phylum: Chordata
- Class: Reptilia
- Order: Squamata
- Suborder: Gekkota
- Family: Gekkonidae
- Genus: Hemidactylus
- Species: H. aquilonius

Binomial name
- Hemidactylus aquilonius Zug & McMahan, 2007

= Hemidactylus aquilonius =

Species of lizard

Hemidactylus aquilonius is a species of gecko. It is found in India and southeast Asia.
