= Xenophrys auralensis =

Conservation status
- Vulnerable (IUCN 3.1)

Scientific classification
- Kingdom: Animalia
- Phylum: Chordata
- Class: Amphibia
- Order: Anura
- Family: Megophryidae
- Genus: Xenophrys
- Species: X. auralensis

Binomial name
- Xenophrys auralensis (Ohler, Swan, and Daltry, 2002)

Synonyms
- Xenophrys auralensis Ohler, Swan, and Daltry, 2002

Species of frog

Xenophrys auralensis (Aural horned frog; Khmer: កង្កែបស្នែងឱរ៉ាល់, kangkaep snaeng aoreal) is a species of frog in the family Megophryidae. It is endemic to Cambodia where it is only known from Phnom Aural, the highest mountain of Cambodia. Its type locality is within the Phnom Aural Wildlife Sanctuary. Its natural habitats are tropical moist lowland forests, moist montane forests, and rivers.
