= Cyrtodactylus ngopensis =

Scientific classification
- Kingdom: Animalia
- Phylum: Chordata
- Class: Reptilia
- Order: Squamata
- Suborder: Gekkota
- Family: Gekkonidae
- Genus: Cyrtodactylus
- Species: C. ngopensis

Binomial name
- Cyrtodactylus ngopensis Bohra, Zonunsanga, Das, Purkayastha, Biakzuala, & Lalremsanga, 2022

Species of lizard

Cyrtodactylus ngopensis is a species of gecko endemic to India.
