= Xenophrys zunhebotoensis =

Conservation status
- Endangered (IUCN 3.1)

Scientific classification
- Kingdom: Animalia
- Phylum: Chordata
- Class: Amphibia
- Order: Anura
- Family: Megophryidae
- Genus: Xenophrys
- Species: X. zunhebotoensis

Binomial name
- Xenophrys zunhebotoensis (Mathew & Sen, 2007)

Synonyms
- Megophrys zunhebotoensis Mathew & Sen, 2007

Species of frog

Xenophrys zunhebotoensis is a species of frog in the family Megophryidae from Nagaland, India, where it is known only from a single site in Nguti (Sukhalu), Zunheboto District.
