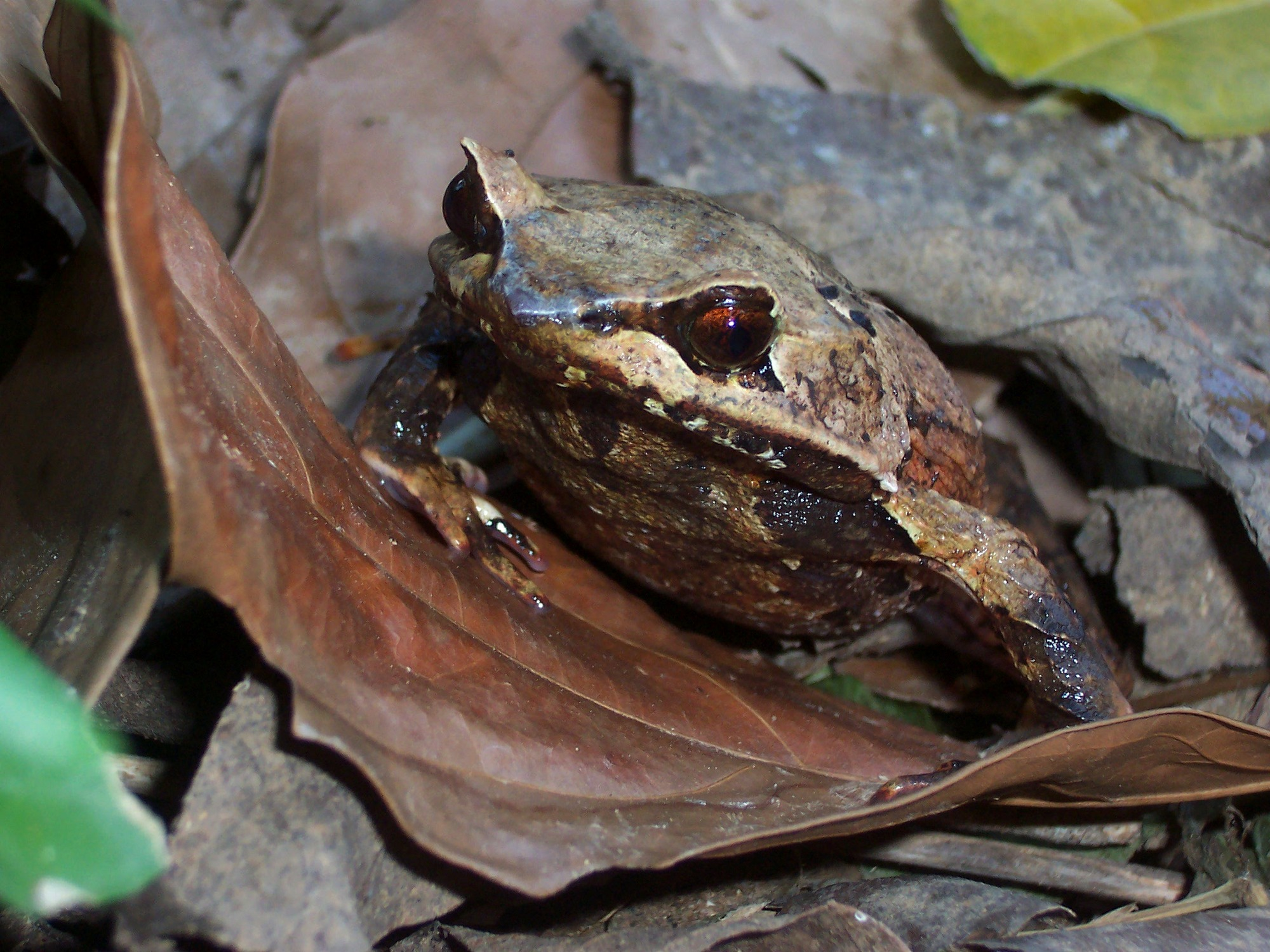
- Megophrys montana

Scientific classification
- Kingdom: Animalia
- Phylum: Chordata
- Class: Amphibia
- Order: Anura
- Family: Megophryidae
- Subfamily: Megophryinae
- Genus: Megophrys; Kuhl & van Hasselt, 1822

Type species
- Megophrys montana Kuhl & van Hasselt, 1822

Species
- Several, see text

Synonyms
- Ceratophryne Schlegel, 1858

= Megophrys =

Genus of amphibians

Megophrys is a genus of frogs in the family Megophryidae. They are endemic to Indonesia, where they are found on the islands of Java and Sumatra. They commonly have elongated upper "eyebrows" and are thus known as Indonesian horned toads. This group was thought to contain many more species and have a much wider distribution prior to recent taxonomic revisions.

== Taxonomy ==
The following species are recognised in the genus Megophrys:

- Megophrys acehensis Munir, Nishikawa, Hamidy, and Smith, 2021
- Megophrys lancip Munir, Hamidy, Farajallah, and Smith, 2018
- Megophrys montana Kuhl and Van Hasselt, 1822
- Megophrys parallela Inger and Iskandar, 2005
- Megophrys selatanensis Munir, Nishikawa, Hamidy, and Smith, 2021

Megophrys formerly contained over a hundred species, but significant taxonomic revisions have led to the vast majority of these species being moved to other genera, such as Xenophrys, Boulenophrys, Atympanophrys and Pelobatrachus. However, there is a divide between studies over this, with most Indian-published studies preferring to classify all these taxa within Megophrys, while Chinese-published studies classify them in their own genera; the IUCN Red List follows the former, while Amphibian Species of the World and AmphibiaWeb follow the latter.

== Endemic ranges ==
Many Megophrys species are endemic to highly restricted geographical areas.

- Southern China
  - Anhui
    - Megophrys huangshanensis: Huangshan mountains, Anhui
  - Guangdong
    - Megophrys acuta: Heishiding, Fengkai County, Guangdong
    - Megophrys obesa: Heishiding, Fengkai County, Guangdong
  - Jiangxi
    - Megophrys cheni: Luoxiao Mountains
    - Megophrys lini: Luoxiao Mountains
    - Megophrys jinggangensis: Luoxiao Mountains
  - Hunan
    - Megophrys sangzhiensis: Sangzhi County, Hunan
    - Megophrys caudoprocta: Tianping Mountain, Sangzhi County, Hunan
    - Megophrys tuberogranulatus: Tianzishan Nature Reserve, Sangzhi County, Hunan
    - Megophrys mangshanensis: Yizhang County, Hunan
  - Chongqing
    - Megophrys baolongensis: Baolong (抱龙镇), Wushan County, Chongqing
    - Megophrys wushanensis: Wu Mountains, Chongqing
  - Yunnan
    - Megophrys binchuanensis: NW Yunnan
    - Megophrys daweimontis: Mount Dawei, Pingbian Miao Autonomous County, Yunnan
    - Megophrys gigantica: Jingdong Yi Autonomous County and Yongde County, southwestern Yunnan
  - Sichuan
    - Megophrys binlingensis: Binling, Hongya County, Sichuan
    - Megophrys wawuensis: Mount Wawu, Hongya County, Sichuan
    - Megophrys nankiangensis: northern Sichuan and southern Gansu
  - Guizhou
    - Megophrys shuichengensis: Fenghuang Village, Shuicheng County, Guizhou
- Tibet
  - Megophrys medogensis: Mêdog County, Tibet
  - Megophrys zhangi: Zhangmu, Nyalam County, Tibet
- Northeast India
  - Megophrys megacephala: East Khasi Hills District, Meghalaya
  - Megophrys oropedion: East Khasi Hills District, Meghalaya
  - Megophrys vegrandis: West Kameng District, Arunachal Pradesh
  - Megophrys ancrae: Changlang District, Arunachal Pradesh
  - Megophrys serchhipii: Serchhip, Mizoram
  - Megophrys zunhebotoensis: Nguti (Sukhalu), Zunheboto District, Nagaland
- Cardamom Mountains, Cambodia
  - Megophrys auralensis: Phnom Aural, Kampong Speu Province
  - Megophrys damrei: Dâmrei Mountains, Kampot Province
- Vietnam
  - Megophrys latidactyla: Pù Mát National Park, Vietnam
- Thailand
  - Megophrys lekaguli: Chanthaburi and Sa Kaeo Provinces, eastern Thailand
  - Megophrys takensis: Tak Province, Thailand
- Borneo
  - Megophrys baluensis: Sabah
  - Megophrys dringi: Mount Mulu, Sarawak
- Sumatra
  - Megophrys parallela: West Sumatra
- Philippines
  - Megophrys ligayae: Balabac and Palawan
  - Megophrys stejnegeri: Mindanao
- Indonesia
  - Megophrys montana: Java
