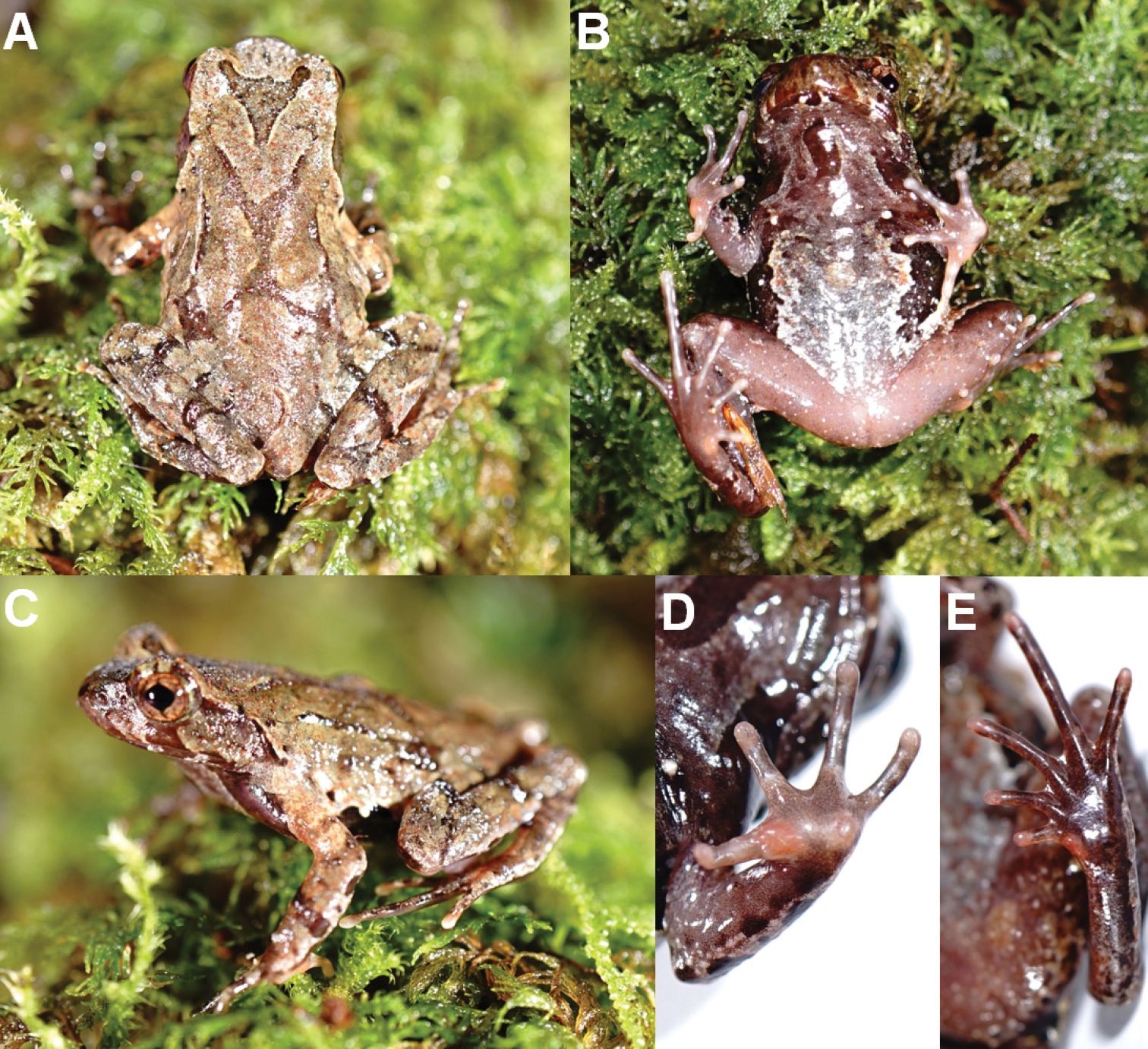
- A－E: back, abdomen, side, forelimb, hind limb

Scientific classification
- Kingdom: Animalia
- Phylum: Chordata
- Class: Amphibia
- Order: Anura
- Family: Megophryidae
- Genus: Boulenophrys
- Species: B. baishanzuensis

Binomial name
- Boulenophrys baishanzuensis Wu, Li, Liu, Wang & Wu, 2020

Synonyms
- Megophrys baishanzuensis

= Baishanzu horned toad =

Species of amphibian

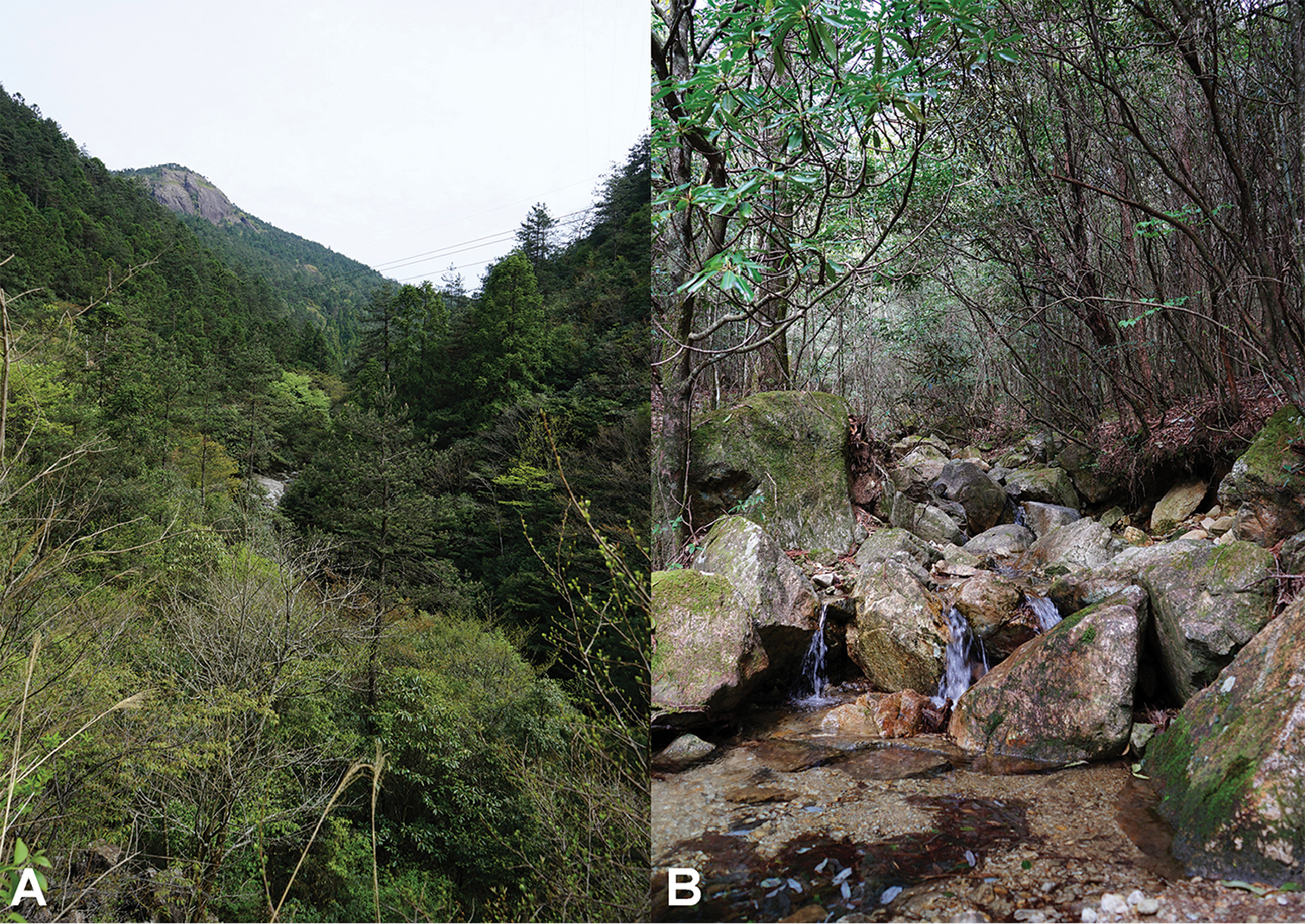
Habitat

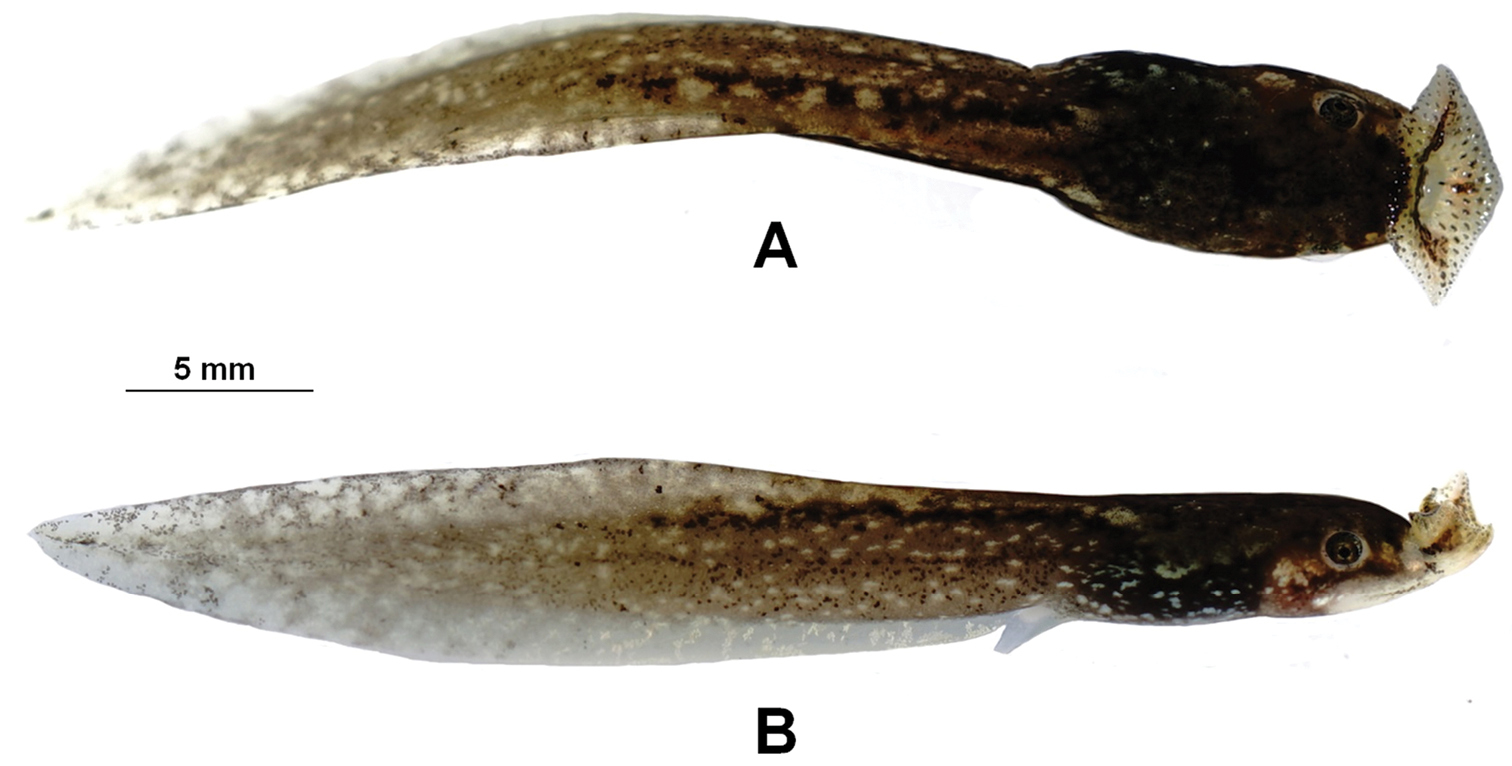
Tadpole

The Baishanzu horned toad (Boulenophrys baishanzuensis) is a species of amphibian found in Baishanzu National Park in Lishui City, Zhejiang Province. It is located in Zhejiang Baishanzu National Park at an altitude of 1400–1600 meters of mountain streams. On January 19, 2021, the press office of the Lishui Municipal Government held a press conference to announce the discovery of new amphibian species in the city.

== Appearance characteristics ==
The male is about 30.5 mm long and has inverted triangles and X-shaped brown markings on the back. The tadpole eyes are large, speckled, and have an umbrella-shaped mouth with an enlargement lip.

== Discovery ==
In June 2020, when the Biodiversity Background Investigation Team of the Ecological Environment Bureau of Lishui City investigated amphibian reptiles in Baishanzu National Park, it found the species in a stream.

In view of the morphology, the call and the close relative Kuatun horned toad are different, it is identified as a new species. The researchers believe that differences in the time of call and reproduction may cause the two to reproductive isolation. The Boettger's horned toad in the same habitat are related to them far away.

Since only 15 male adult individuals and 4 tadpoles were found in one stream, the researchers believe that the species should be protected. It has been suggested that the species be classified as endangered by the IUCN Red List.
