= Megophrys elfina =

Conservation status
- Least Concern (IUCN 3.1)

Scientific classification
- Kingdom: Animalia
- Phylum: Chordata
- Class: Amphibia
- Order: Anura
- Family: Megophryidae
- Genus: Megophrys
- Species: M. elfina

Binomial name
- Megophrys elfina Poyarkov, Duong, Orlov, Gogoleva, Vassilieva, Nguyen, Nguyen, Nguyen, Che & Mahony, 2017

Synonyms
- Ophryophryne elfina (Poyarkov, Duong, Orlov, Gogoleva, Vassilieva, Nguyen, Nguyen, Nguyen, Che & Mahony, 2017)

Species of toad

Megophrys elfina, the Elfin mountain toad, is a species of toad from the Megophrys genus. The toad is found in forests and wetlands of Vietnam, and their presence is still uncertain in Cambodia. It has an elevation range of 700 to 2,300 m (2,300 to 7,500 ft). Despite its declining population, it is listed as Least Concern by the IUCN. The species was scientifically described in 2017.
