= Jichang =

Jichang, may refer to:

== Town ==
- Jichang (Shuicheng County), a rural town in Shuicheng County, Guizhou, China
- Jichang (Qinglong County), a rural town in Qinglong County, Guizhou, China

== Garden ==
- Jichang Garden (Chinese: 寄畅园), a garden in Xihui Park, Wuxi, Jiangsu, China

== Transportation ==
- Airports in China (Chinese: 机场, pinyin: jīchǎng)
