= Duping =

Duping may refer to:

- Duping (video games), the practice of illegitimately creating duplicates of items or currency in a persistent online game
- Duping, Guangdong, a town in Fengkai County, Guangdong, China
- Duping, Guizhou (都坪), a town in Zhenyuan County, Guizhou, China
- Duping Township (笃坪乡), a township in Wushan County, Chongqing, China
