= Megophrys lancip =

Scientific classification
- Kingdom: Animalia
- Phylum: Chordata
- Class: Amphibia
- Order: Anura
- Family: Megophryidae
- Genus: Megophrys
- Species: M. lancip

Binomial name
- Megophrys lancip Munir, Hamidy, Farajallah & Smith, 2018

Species of frog

Megophrys lancip, the pointed horned frog, is a species of frog from the Megophrys genus. It is endemic to Indonesia. The species was scientifically described in 2018.
