= Boulenophrys acuta =

Conservation status
- Critically Endangered (IUCN 3.1)

Scientific classification
- Kingdom: Animalia
- Phylum: Chordata
- Class: Amphibia
- Order: Anura
- Family: Megophryidae
- Genus: Boulenophrys
- Species: B. acuta

Binomial name
- Boulenophrys acuta (Wang, Li & Jin, 2014)

Synonyms
- Megophrys acuta; Xenophrys acuta; Panophrys acuta

Species of frog

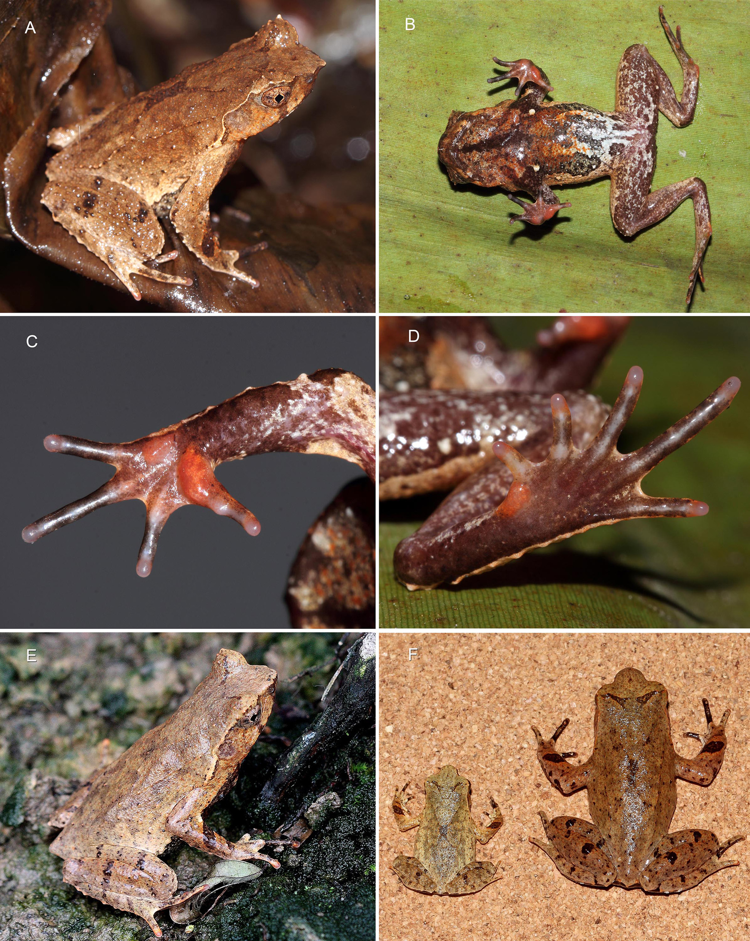

Boulenophrys acuta is a species of frog in the family Megophryidae. It is endemic to China and only known from its type locality, Heishiding Nature Reserve in Fengkai County, Guangdong Province, southern China.
