= Megophrys selatanensis =

Scientific classification
- Kingdom: Animalia
- Phylum: Chordata
- Class: Amphibia
- Order: Anura
- Family: Megophryidae
- Genus: Megophrys
- Species: M. selatanensis

Binomial name
- Megophrys selatanensis Munir, Nishikawa, Hamidy & Smith, 2021

Species of frog

Megophrys selatanensis, the South-Sumatran horned-frog, is a species of frog from the genus Megophrys native to Indonesia. The species was scientifically described in 2021.
