= Liurana xizangensis =

Conservation status
- Vulnerable (IUCN 3.1)

Scientific classification
- Kingdom: Animalia
- Phylum: Chordata
- Class: Amphibia
- Order: Anura
- Family: Ceratobatrachidae
- Genus: Liurana
- Species: L. xizangensis

Binomial name
- Liurana xizangensis (Hu, 1977)

Synonyms
- Cornufer xizangensis Hu, 1977; Ingerana xizangensis (Hu, 1977); Platymantis xizangensis (Hu, 1977); Micrixalus xizangensis (Hu, 1977); Liurana xizangensis (Hu, 1977); Limnonectes xizangensis (Hu, 1977)

Species of frog

Liurana xizangensis is a species of frog in the family Ceratobatrachidae. It is endemic to Tibet (=Xizang in Chinese), China, and only known from the region of its type locality, Yi'ong, in Bomê County. It is also known as Xizang eastern frog and Xizang papillae-tongued frog.

== Description ==
Male Liurana xizangensis measure about 21 mm (0.83 in) in snout–vent length. The tympanum is large and distinct. Skin is dorsally smooth but with scattered tubercles, while the belly is granular. The finger and toe tips are not swollen. No webbing is present. The dorsum is brown with a black inter-ocular stripe. The belly is pale yellow with black, reticulated markings.

== Habitat and conservation ==
Liurana xizangensis occur mixed forests at elevations of about 2,300 m (7,500 ft) above sea level. They live in humid habitats, typically hiding under mossy rocks. There are no known threats to this poorly-known species, but its population size is believed to be small. The known range does not include any protected areas. However, its actual range might be wider than currently known.
