= Boulenophrys tuberogranulata =

Conservation status
- Endangered (IUCN 3.1)

Scientific classification
- Kingdom: Animalia
- Phylum: Chordata
- Class: Amphibia
- Order: Anura
- Family: Megophryidae
- Genus: Boulenophrys
- Species: B. tuberogranulata

Binomial name
- Boulenophrys tuberogranulata (Shen, Mo and Li, 2010)

Synonyms
- Megophrys tuberogranulata Shen, Mo and Li, 2010

Species of frog

Boulenophrys tuberogranulata is a species of frog in the family Megophryidae. Its type locality is Tianzishan Nature Reserve, Sangzhi County, Hunan Province, China.
