= Xinghua, Fengkai County =

Xinghua 杏花镇
- Town
- Location in Guangdong
- Coordinates: 23°24′01″N 111°42′23″E
- Country: People's Republic of China
- Province: Guangdong
- Prefecture-level city: Zhaoqing
- County: Fengkai
- Village-level divisions: 1 residential community 11 villages

Area
  - Total: 156.3 km^{2} (60.3 sq mi)
- Elevation: 97 m (318 ft)

Population
  - Total: 32,000
  - Density: 200/km^{2} (530/sq mi)
- Time zone: UTC+8 (China Standard)
- Area code: 0758

Xinghua (Chinese: 杏花; pinyin: Xìnghuā; lit. 'apricot blossom') is a town of Fengkai County in western Guangdong province, China, located 20 kilometres (12 mi) east of the county seat. As of 2011, it has one residential community (社区) and 11 villages under its administration.

== See also ==
- List of township-level divisions of Guangdong
