= Boulenophrys angka =

Scientific classification
- Kingdom: Animalia
- Phylum: Chordata
- Class: Amphibia
- Order: Anura
- Family: Megophryidae
- Genus: Boulenophrys
- Species: B. angka

Binomial name
- Boulenophrys angka (Wu, Suwannapoom, Poyarkov, Chen, Pawangkhanant, Xu, Jin, Murphy, and Che, 2019)

Species of amphibian

Boulenophrys angka is a species of amphibian from the Boulenophrys genus. It is native to northern Thailand. The species was described in 2019.
