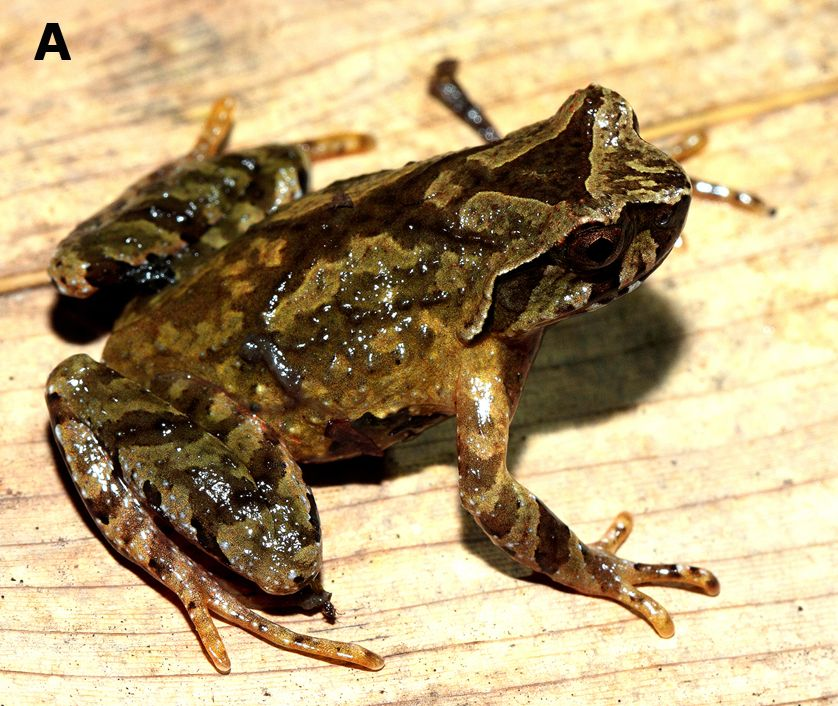
- Holotype of Boulenophrys cheni (male)

Conservation status
- Vulnerable (IUCN 3.1)

Scientific classification
- Kingdom: Animalia
- Phylum: Chordata
- Class: Amphibia
- Order: Anura
- Family: Megophryidae
- Genus: Boulenophrys
- Species: B. cheni

Binomial name
- Boulenophrys cheni (Wang and Liu, 2014)

Synonyms
- Xenophrys cheni Wang and Liu, 2014 in Wang et al., 2014; Megophrys cheni (Wang & Liu, 2014)

= Boulenophrys cheni =

Species of frog

Boulenophrys cheni is a species of frog in the family Megophryidae. It is endemic to the middle Luoxiao Mountains at the border of Jiangxi and Hunan provinces in south-eastern China. Its specific name honours Chen Chunquan, former director of the Jinggang National Nature Reserve.

== Description ==
Males measure 26–30 mm (1.0–1.2 in) and females 32–34 mm (1.3–1.3 in) in snout–vent length. The snout is short. The tympanum is distinct or indistinct, partly hidden by the swollen, light-coloured supratympanic fold.

The skin of upper surfaces and flanks is smooth with tubercles; tubercles usually form dorsolateral rows, with a weak, X-shaped ridge between them, and four–five transverse rows on shanks.

There is a small, horn-like tubercle at the edge of the eyelid. Ventral surface is smooth. Colouration above is red brown or olive brown, with the dorsum bearing a dark, reticular marking.

Males have a single vocal sac. Based on calling males, reproductive season is April–September. Tadpoles are unknown.

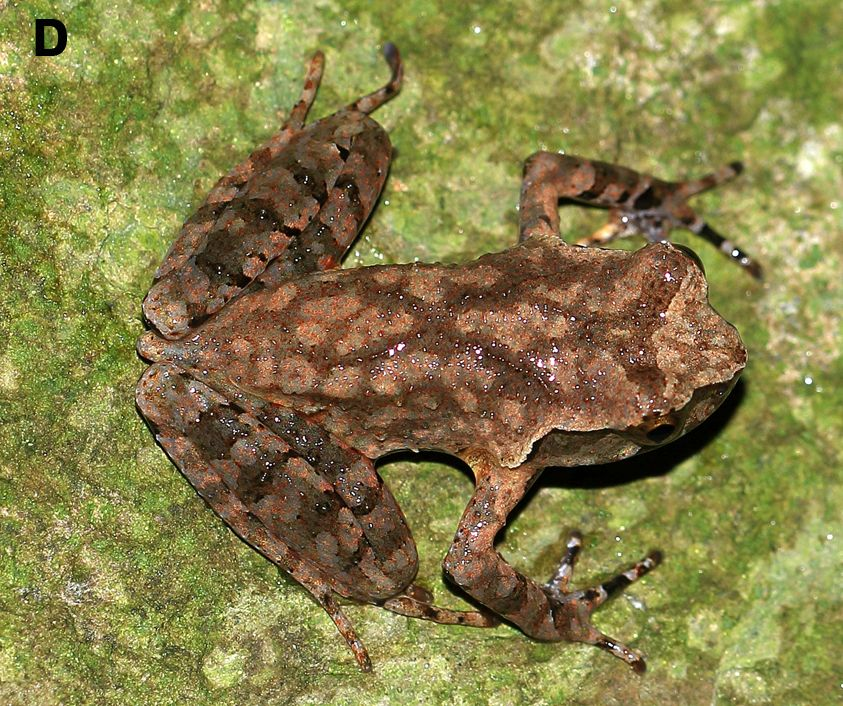
Boulenophrys cheni, female paratype.

== Distribution and habitat ==
This newly described species is known from three locations on the Luoxiao Mountains: Jingzhushan (the type locality) on the Jinggang Mountains in Jiangxi, and Dayuan and Lishuzhou, both in the Yanling Taoyuandong National Nature Reserve, Hunan. It lives in mountainous swamps surrounded by subtropical moist evergreen broadleaf forests at elevations of 1,200–1,530 m (3,940–5,020 ft) asl.

Two other Boulenophrys species occur in the area, but the three species differ in their habitats: Boulenophrys jinggangensis live in slow-moving streams at 700–850 m (2,300–2,790 ft) asl, and Boulenophrys lini in rushing streams at 1,100–1,610 m (3,610–5,280 ft) asl. The species also differ in the characteristics of the male advertisement calls.
