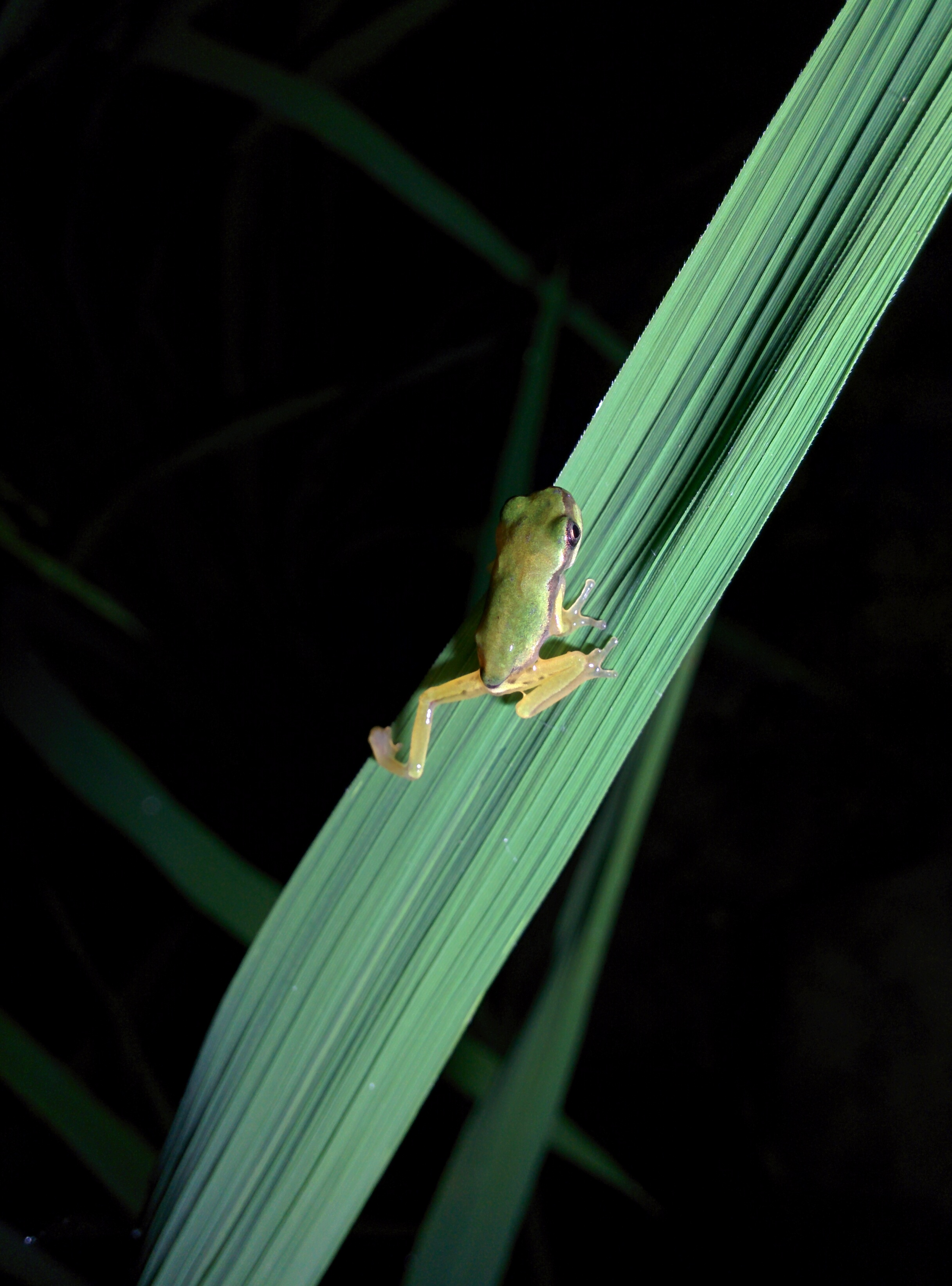

Conservation status
- Least Concern (IUCN 3.1)

Scientific classification
- Kingdom: Animalia
- Phylum: Chordata
- Class: Amphibia
- Order: Anura
- Family: Hylidae
- Genus: Hyla
- Species: H. tsinlingensis

Binomial name
- Hyla tsinlingensis Liu & Hu, 1966

= Shensi tree frog =

Shenshi tree frog

Species of amphibian

The Shensi tree frog (Hyla tsinlingensis) is a species of frog in the family Hylidae endemic to China. Its natural habitats are temperate shrubland, rivers, intermittent rivers, swamps, freshwater marshes, intermittent freshwater marshes, and irrigated land. It is threatened by habitat loss.
