= Amolops chaochin =

Scientific classification
- Kingdom: Animalia
- Phylum: Chordata
- Class: Amphibia
- Order: Anura
- Family: Ranidae
- Genus: Amolops
- Species: A. chaochin

Binomial name
- Amolops chaochin Jiang, Ren, Lyu, Wang, Wang, Lv, Wu & Li, 2021

Species of frog

Amolops chaochin, or Chaochin's torrent frog, is a species of frog endemic to the mountainous regions of the Sichuan Basin, including Chengdu City, Chongzhou, Dayi, Dujiangyan, Leshan City, Mount Emei, Mianyan City, Anxian Anxiang County, Ya’an City, Tianquan, Guizhou, Bijie and Ganzu Wenxian, China. Molecular markers, advertisement call, and natural history differentiate it from Amolops chunganensis and Amolops monticola.

Chaochin's torrent frog is named in honor of Shuchin Hu and her husband Cheng-Chao Liu.
