= Feng Prefecture (Guangdong) =

Historical administrative division in Guangdong, China

Fengzhou or Feng Prefecture (封州) was a zhou (prefecture) in imperial China, centering on modern Fengkai County, Guangdong, China. It was created in 590 by the Sui dynasty and existed (intermittently) until 1369 during the Ming dynasty.

== Geography ==
The administrative region of Fengzhou in the Tang dynasty is in the border area of modern western Guangdong and eastern Guangxi. It probably includes parts of modern:

- Under the administration of Zhaoqing, Guangdong:
  - Fengkai County
- Under the administration of Yunfu, Guangdong:
  - Yunan County
- Under the administration of Wuzhou, Guangxi:
  - Wuzhou
  - Cangwu County
