= Shaping horned toad =

Conservation status
- Least Concern (IUCN 3.1)

Scientific classification
- Kingdom: Animalia
- Phylum: Chordata
- Class: Amphibia
- Order: Anura
- Family: Megophryidae
- Genus: Atympanophrys
- Species: A. shapingensis

Binomial name
- Atympanophrys shapingensis (Liu, 1950)

Synonyms
- Megophrys shapingensis Liu, 1950; Xenophrys shapingensis (Liu, 1950)

Species of frog

The Shaping horned toad (Atympanophrys shapingensis) is a species of frog in the family Megophryidae. It is endemic to China and known only from Sichuan and Yunnan provinces. Its natural habitats are subtropical or tropical moist montane forests, subtropical or tropical high-altitude shrubland, and rivers. It is threatened by habitat loss.

Males measure 77 mm (3.0 in) and females 94 mm (3.7 in) in length.
