= Odorrana lungshengensis =

Conservation status
- Least Concern (IUCN 3.1)

Scientific classification
- Kingdom: Animalia
- Phylum: Chordata
- Class: Amphibia
- Order: Anura
- Family: Ranidae
- Genus: Odorrana
- Species: O. lungshengensis

Binomial name
- Odorrana lungshengensis (Liu & Hu, 1962)

Synonyms
- Rana lungshengensis Liu & Hu, 1962

Species of amphibian

Odorrana lungshengensis (common names: Lung-shen-hsien frog, Lungshen odorous frog) is a species of frogs in the family Ranidae that is endemic to China. It is found in northeastern Guangxi, southwestern Hunan, and eastern Guizhou. Its natural habitats are hill streams in broad-leaf forests. It is becoming rare due to habitat loss.

Male Odorrana lungshengensis grow to a snout–vent length of about 62 mm (2.4 in) and females to 81 mm (3.2 in).
