= Megophrys parallela =

Conservation status
- Least Concern (IUCN 3.1)

Scientific classification
- Kingdom: Animalia
- Phylum: Chordata
- Class: Amphibia
- Order: Anura
- Family: Megophryidae
- Genus: Megophrys
- Species: M. parallela

Binomial name
- Megophrys parallela Inger and Iskandar, 2005

Synonyms
- Xenophrys parallela (Inger and Iskandar, 2005)

Species of frog

Megophrys parallela is a species of frog in the family Megophryidae. It is endemic to Sumatra and known from a number of localities on mountains along the island's western coast where it is expected to have a wide distribution.

== Description ==
Adult males measure 38–46 mm (1.5–1.8 in) and adult females, based on a single specimen, 47 mm (1.9 in) in snout–vent length, without the rostral appendage. The habitus is stocky and robust. The head is wider than the body. The snout is short but with a pointed tip. The canthus rostralis is sharp. The tympanum is small and posteriorly obscured by skin;; the supratympanic fold is sharply angular. The upper eyelid has a short and several low, conical tubercles. The fingers and the toes have rounded but not enlarged tips; the toes have basal webbing. The dorsolateral folds are parallel (hence the specific name parallela). Preserved specimens are dorsally dark gray to brown with a number of dark markings, including a backward-pointing triangular interorbital marking. The abdomen is cream with varying amounts of brown mottling.

== Habitat and conservation ==
Megophrys parallela occurs in montane tropical rainforests at elevations of 1,250–1,450 m (4,100–4,760 ft) above sea level. It has been found in both primary and secondary forest, indicating a degree of tolerance to habitat degradation. Specimens have found on dead leaves, on a small log on the bank of a small stream, and in cracks of rocks. Reproduction presumably involves stream-living tadpoles.

Megophrys parallela does not appear to be common, although this might reflect its quiet call and cryptic habits. It is probably threatened by habitat loss and degradation caused by logging and deforestation. However, it does occur in a number of protected areas.
