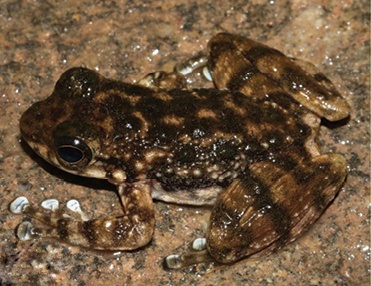

Conservation status
- Least Concern (IUCN 3.1)

Scientific classification
- Kingdom: Animalia
- Phylum: Chordata
- Class: Amphibia
- Order: Anura
- Family: Ranidae
- Genus: Amolops
- Species: A. wuyiensis

Binomial name
- Amolops wuyiensis (Liu & Hu, 1975)

= Amolops wuyiensis =

Wuyi Torrent Frog

Species of frog

Amolops wuyiensis, commonly known as the Wuyi torrent frog, is a species of frog in the family Ranidae that is endemic to south-eastern China where it is found in Fujian, Anhui and Zhejiang provinces. Its name refers to the Wuyi Mountains in Fujian.

It occurs in large streams and the surrounding forest habitat. Though its numbers are in decline, it is not considered threatened by the IUCN.
