= Megophrys acehensis =

Scientific classification
- Kingdom: Animalia
- Phylum: Chordata
- Class: Amphibia
- Order: Anura
- Family: Megophryidae
- Genus: Megophrys
- Species: M. acehensis

Binomial name
- Megophrys acehensis Munir, Nishikawa, Hamidy & Smith, 2021

Species of frog

Megophrys acehensis, the Aceh horned frog, is a species of frog from the genus Megophrys. The species is endemic to Indonesia and was scientifically described in 2021.
