= Bufo cryptotympanicus =

Conservation status
- Least Concern (IUCN 3.1)

Scientific classification
- Kingdom: Animalia
- Phylum: Chordata
- Class: Amphibia
- Order: Anura
- Family: Bufonidae
- Genus: Bufo
- Species: B. cryptotympanicus

Binomial name
- Bufo cryptotympanicus Liu & Hu, 1962

Species of amphibian

Bufo cryptotympanicus is a species of toad in the family Bufonidae. Known commonly as the earless toad, it is found in southern China (Guangxi and Guangdong provinces) and northern Vietnam (on/near Mount Fansipan). Its natural habitats are subtropical or tropical moist lowland forests, rivers, swamps, freshwater marshes, and intermittent freshwater marshes. It is threatened by habitat loss.

The earless toad is about 68 mm (2.7 in) in length.
