= Boulenophrys sangzhiensis =

Conservation status
- Critically Endangered (IUCN 3.1)

Scientific classification
- Kingdom: Animalia
- Phylum: Chordata
- Class: Amphibia
- Order: Anura
- Family: Megophryidae
- Genus: Boulenophrys
- Species: B. sangzhiensis

Binomial name
- Boulenophrys sangzhiensis (Jiang, Ye & Fei, 2008)

Synonyms
- Xenophrys sangzhiensis (Jiang, Ye & Fei, 2008); Megophrys sangzhiensis

Species of frog

Boulenophrys sangzhiensis is a species of frog in the family Megophryidae. It is endemic to China, being only known from the type locality in Sangzhi County, Hunan, in south-central China.

Boulenophrys sangzhiensis resembles Boulenophrys caudoprocta but is smaller, with snout-vent length of 55 mm (2.2 in).
