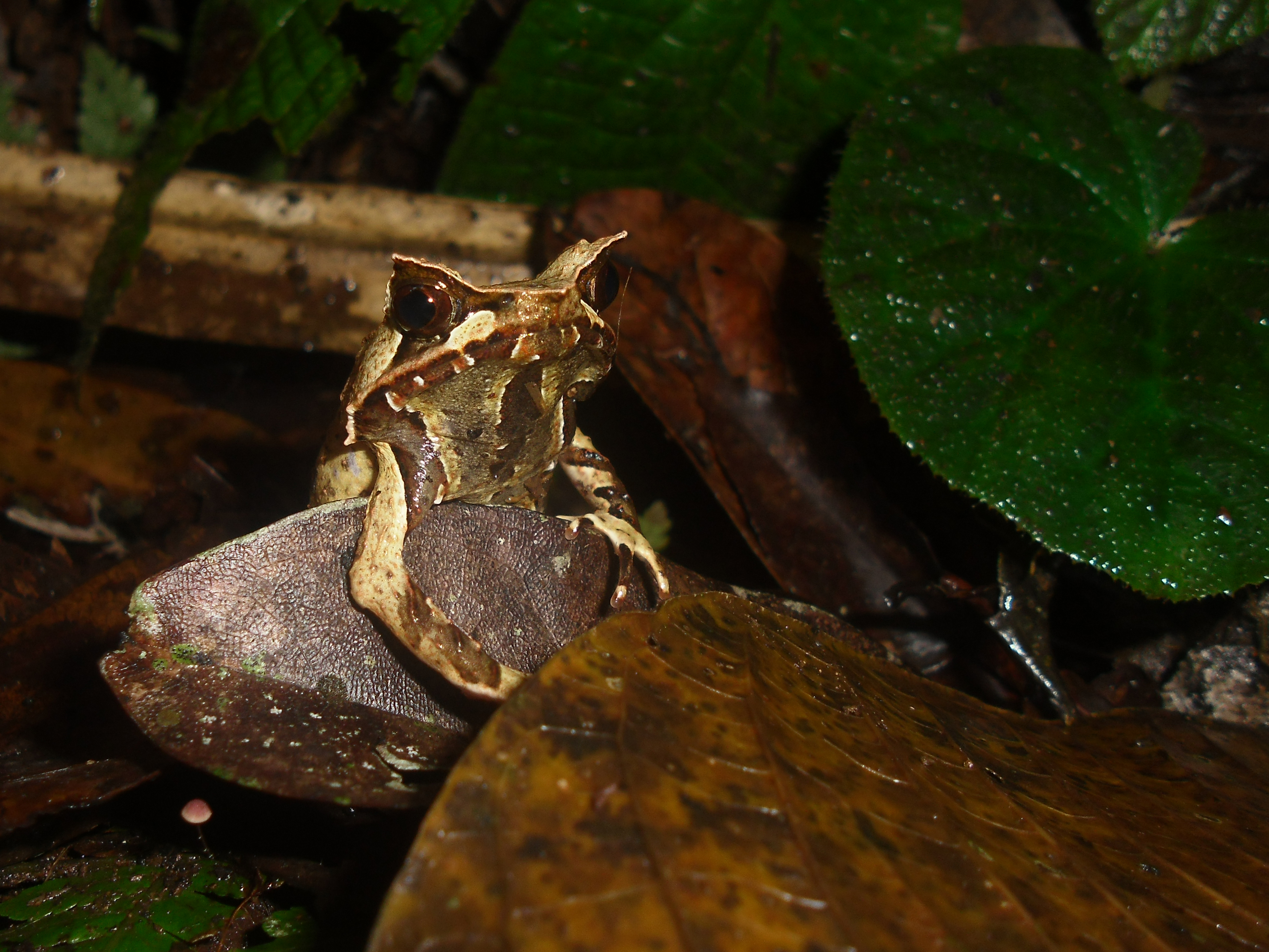

Conservation status
- Least Concern (IUCN 3.1)

Scientific classification
- Kingdom: Animalia
- Phylum: Chordata
- Class: Amphibia
- Order: Anura
- Family: Megophryidae
- Genus: Megophrys
- Species: M. montana

Binomial name
- Megophrys montana Kuhl and Van Hasselt, 1822

= Megophrys montana =

Species of amphibian

Megophrys montana (Asian horned frog, horned frog, Asian spadefoot toad, Javan horned frog, Malayan leaf frog) is a species of frog found in Java and possibly Sumatra.

== Description ==
Megophrys montana is a relatively large frog: males can reach 92 mm (3.6 in) in snout-vent length and females 111 mm (4.4 in). As their common name suggests, these frogs have "horns": their upper eyelids have horn-like elongations.

== Distribution and habitat ==
Known with certainty only from Java and possibly from western Sumatra, Indonesia. Records of Megophrys montana outside this range (from Thailand southeast to Sumatra, Natuna Islands, Borneo, and the Philippines) apply to related named and unnamed species. They occur from near sea level up to at least 1,200 m (3,900 ft). Megophrys montana live on the forest floor in primary and secondary forests, and to some extent, plantations.

== Behaviour ==
These frogs are relatively clumsy and rely on camouflage for defense. They do not move unless touched or molested.
