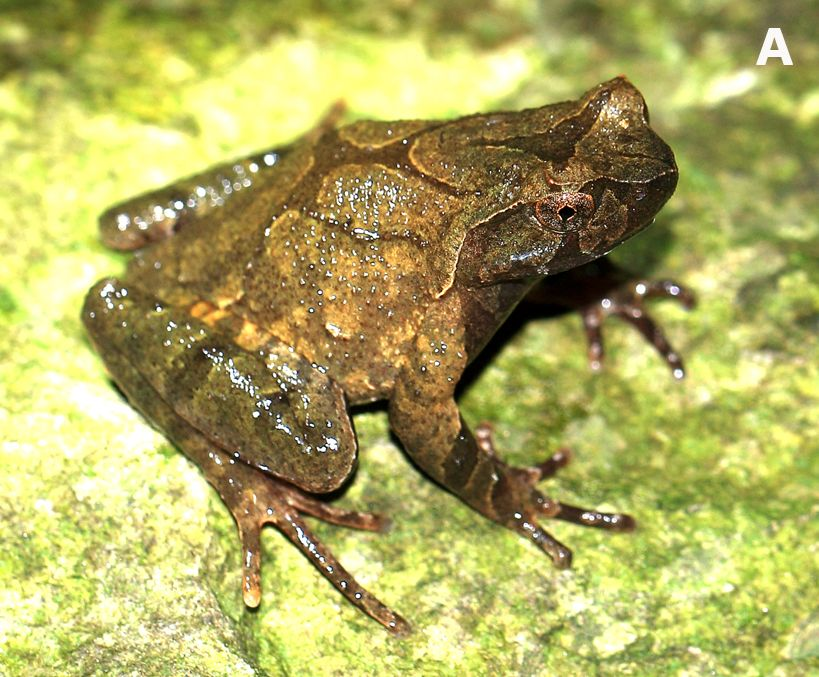
- Holotype of Boulenophrys lini (male)

Conservation status
- Endangered (IUCN 3.1)

Scientific classification
- Kingdom: Animalia
- Phylum: Chordata
- Class: Amphibia
- Order: Anura
- Family: Megophryidae
- Genus: Boulenophrys
- Species: B. lini

Binomial name
- Boulenophrys lini (Wang and Yang, 2014)

Synonyms
- Xenophrys lini Wang and Yang, 2014 in Wang et al., 2014; Megophrys lini (Wang and Yang, 2014)

= Boulenophrys lini =

Species of amphibian

Boulenophrys lini is a species of frogs in the family Megophryidae. It is endemic to Luoxiao Mountains at the border of the Jiangxi and Hunan provinces in southeastern China. Its specific name honours professor Ying Lin (1914–2003), botanist and vice chancellor of Nanchang University who conducted biodiversity surveys and research in the Jinggang Mountains.

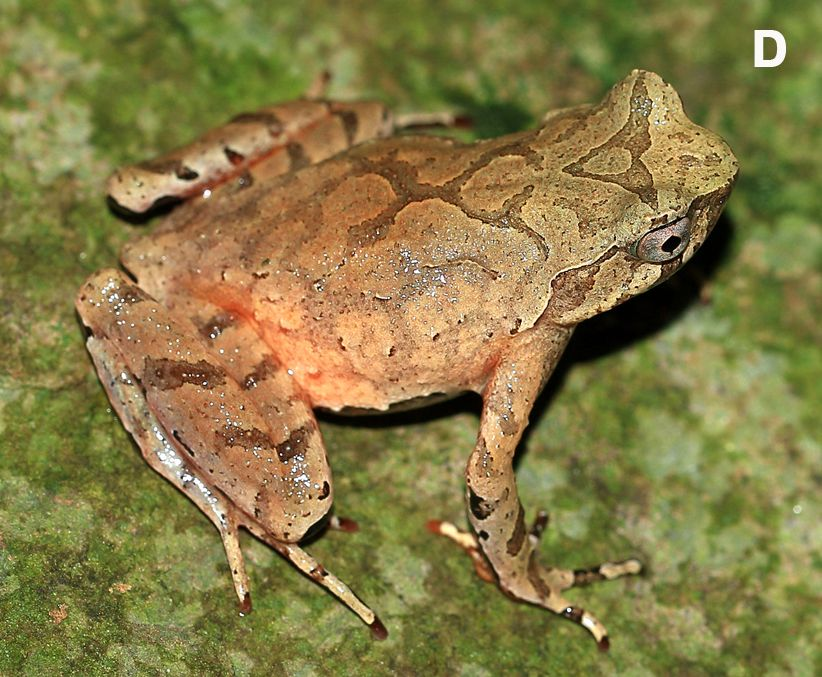
Boulenophrys lini, female paratype

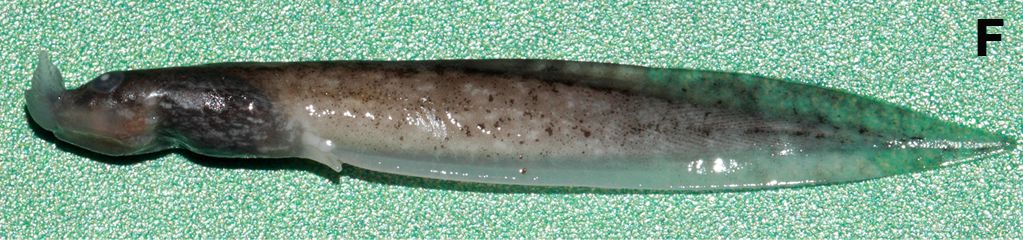
Boulenophrys lini tadpole

== Description ==
Males measure 34–40 mm (1.3–1.6 in) and females 37–40 mm (1.5–1.6 in) in snout–vent length. Snout is short. Dorsal skin is smooth and has scattered granules, and usually, a few curved weak ridges. There is a small, horn-like tubercle at the edge of the eyelid as well as several tubercles on the flanks. Supratympanic fold is narrow and light coloured. Dorsal colour is light brown or olive. There is a dark, triangular interorbital marking, and an X-shaped dorsal marking with light bordering. Ventral surfaces are smooth. Hind legs are elongated; toes have rudimentary webbing.

Males have tiny, black nuptial spines on the middle of the dorsal surface of the first finger and a single vocal sack. They call both day and night. Reproductive season is assumed to start in September–October.

Tadpoles have a maximum length of about 33 mm (1.3 in). Body is slender and horizontally compressed, with dorsal fin than is slightly higher than the body. Oral disk is terminal with expanded and upward-directed lips.

== Distribution and habitat ==
Boulenophrys lini is only known from a number of locations on the Luoxiao Mountains: Dabali and Niushiping in the Yanling Taoyuandong National Nature Reserve, Hunan, and Jingzhushan, Bamianshan (the type locality), and Nanfengmian Nature Reserve in Jiangxi. It lives along rushing mountain streams surrounded by subtropical moist evergreen broadleaf forests at elevations of 1,100–1,610 m (3,610–5,280 ft) asl. Tadpoles have been found under rocks in a stream.

Two other Boulenophrys species occur in the area, but the three species differ in their habitats: Boulenophrys jinggangensis lives in slow-moving streams at 700–850 m (2,300–2,790 ft) asl, and Boulenophrys cheni in swamps at forest edges at 1,200–1,530 m (3,940–5,020 ft) asl. The species also differ in the characteristics of the male advertisement calls.

== Conservation ==
Boulenophrys lini is locally common and occurs in well-protected reserves. However, it is likely to suffer from habitat loss and deterioration outside the protected areas.
