= Medog horned toad =

Conservation status
- Endangered (IUCN 3.1)

Scientific classification
- Kingdom: Animalia
- Phylum: Chordata
- Class: Amphibia
- Order: Anura
- Family: Megophryidae
- Genus: Xenophrys
- Species: X. medogensis

Binomial name
- Xenophrys medogensis (Fei, Ye & Huang, 1983)

Synonyms
- Megophrys omeimontis ssp. medogensis Fei, Ye & Huang, 1983; Megophrys medogensis Fei, Ye & Huang, 1983

Species of frog

The Medog horned toad (Xenophrys medogensis), or Medog spadefoot toad, is a species of frog in the family Megophryidae. It was described as a subspecies of Omei horned toad (Megophrys omeimontis) based on specimens collected from Mêdog County, Tibet (China); it is still only known from its type locality. It probably has a wider distribution that may reach India. Its natural habitats are subtropical or tropical moist lowland forests, subtropical or tropical moist montane forests, and rivers.
