= Wushan horned toad =

Conservation status
- Least Concern (IUCN 3.1)

Scientific classification
- Kingdom: Animalia
- Phylum: Chordata
- Class: Amphibia
- Order: Anura
- Family: Megophryidae
- Genus: Boulenophrys
- Species: B. wushanensis

Binomial name
- Boulenophrys wushanensis (Ye and Fei, 1995)

Synonyms
- Megophrys wushanensis Ye & Fei, 1995; Xenophrys wushanensis (Ye and Fei, 1995)

Species of frog

The Wushan horned toad (Boulenophrys wushanensis) is a species of frog in the family Megophryidae. It is only known from its type locality in the Wu Mountains of Chongqing Municipality (formerly part of Sichuan province) and is thus endemic to China. Its natural habitats are subtropical or tropical moist montane forests and rivers. It is threatened by habitat loss.
