= Boulenophrys obesa =

Conservation status
- Critically Endangered (IUCN 3.1)

Scientific classification
- Kingdom: Animalia
- Phylum: Chordata
- Class: Amphibia
- Order: Anura
- Family: Megophryidae
- Genus: Boulenophrys
- Species: B. obesa

Binomial name
- Boulenophrys obesa (Wang, Li, and Zhao, 2014)

Synonyms
- Megophrys obesa Wang, Li, and Zhao, 2014

Species of frog

Boulenophrys obesa is a species of frog in the family Megophryidae. Its type locality is Heishiding Nature Reserve, Fengkai County, Guangdong Province, China.
