= Amolops granulosus =

Conservation status
- Least Concern (IUCN 3.1)

Scientific classification
- Kingdom: Animalia
- Phylum: Chordata
- Class: Amphibia
- Order: Anura
- Family: Ranidae
- Genus: Amolops
- Species: A. granulosus

Binomial name
- Amolops granulosus (Liu & Hu, 1961)

Species of frog

Amolops granulosus is a species of frog in the family Ranidae that is endemic to China.

Its natural habitats are temperate forests and rivers. It is not considered threatened by the IUCN.
