= Hu Shuqin =

Chinese herpetologist (1914–1992)

- 胡淑琴
- Born: February 13, 1914; Changshu, Jiangsu Province
- Died: November 10, 1992 (aged 78); Chengdu, Sichuan Province
- Education: Soochow University
- Known for: Discovery of over 120 new species of amphibians
- Spouse(s): Liu Cheng-chao (刘承钊, 1900–1976)
- Scientific career
- Fields: Herpetologist
- Workplaces: Huaxi University; Yenching University; Sichuan Medical Institute; Chengdu Institute of Biology, Academia Sinica
- Author abbrev. (zoology): Hu, S.-Q.

Hu Shuqin (Note: In this Chinese name, the family name is Hu.) (Chinese: 胡淑琴; pinyin: Hú Shūqín; Wade–Giles: Hu Shu Ch'in; February 13, 1914 – November 10, 1992) was a Chinese herpetologist. Throughout her career she participated in the discovery of over 120 new species and subspecies of amphibians, primarily frogs. She frequently worked professionally and as a research partner with Liu Cheng-chao (刘承钊, 1900–1976), her husband, and they are regarded as the parents of Chinese herpetology.

Her name is honored in the genus name of Huia cavitympanum and the species name of Amolops chaochin.

== Biography ==
Hu Shuqin graduated in 1937 from Soochow University in Suzhou, where she studied biology, notably under the zoologist Liu Cheng-chao, who she would later marry. During the Second Sino-Japanese War, the two biologists moved to Chengdu. While Liu became a professor at West China Union University, Hu worked at Huaxi University, Yenching University, and the Sichuan Medical Institute (now known as West China Medical Center). In 1960, she was worked at the Chengdu Institute of Biology in Academia Sinica.

Her research was closely linked to that of her husband, Liu, whom she married in 1941. Hu was a part of some forty academic publications alongside her husband. Despite the difficulties caused by the war, she conducted extensive fieldwork. She described, alone or with colleagues, more than 120 species of amphibians. Hu contributed to the publication of several identification guides for Chinese reptiles and amphibians. Some of her publications bear her name as Hu Shu-chin or Hu Shu-ching.

== Taxon named in her honor ==
- Rana shuchinae Liu, 1950
- Amolops chaochin
- Huia cavitympanum

== Taxons described ==
- Achalinus meiguensis
- Amolops daiyunensis
- Amolops granulosus
- Amolops wuyiensis
- Atympanophrys
- Bombina fortinuptialis
- Bombina (Glandula) microdeladigitora
- Brachytarsophrys
- Bufo cryptotympanicus
- Chaparana quadranus
- Chaparana unculuanus
- Hyla tsinlingensis
- Ingerana xizangensis
- Leptobrachium leishanense
- Ingerana xizangensis
- Microhyla mixtura
- Oreolalax major
- Oreolalax omeimontis
- Oreolalax puxiongensis
- Oreolalax rhodostigmatus
- Paa exilispinosa
- Paa maculosa
- Parapelophryne scalpta
- Rana anlungensis
- Rana chevronta
- Rana kuangwuensis
- Rana lungshengensis
- Rana nigrolineata
- Rana Versabilis
- Rana weiningensis
- Scutiger chintingensis
- Theloderma kwangsiense
- Xenopeltis hainanensis
- Xenophrys gigantica
- Xenophrys nankiangensis
- Xenophrys spinata
