= Boulenophrys daweimontis =

Conservation status
- Least Concern (IUCN 3.1)

Scientific classification
- Kingdom: Animalia
- Phylum: Chordata
- Class: Amphibia
- Order: Anura
- Family: Megophryidae
- Genus: Boulenophrys
- Species: B. daweimontis

Binomial name
- Boulenophrys daweimontis (Rao and Yang, 1997)

Synonyms
- Megophrys daweimontis Rao and Yang, 1997; Xenophrys daweimontis (Rao and Yang, 1997)

Species of frog

Boulenophrys daweimontis, the Mount Dawei horned toad, is a species of frog in the family Megophryidae. It is only known from Mount Dawe) in Pingbian Miao Autonomous County, Yunnan, China, near the Vietnamese border. It is also likely to occur in the adjacent parts of Vietnam. Its natural habitats are subtropical or tropical moist montane forests and rivers. It is threatened by habitat loss.
