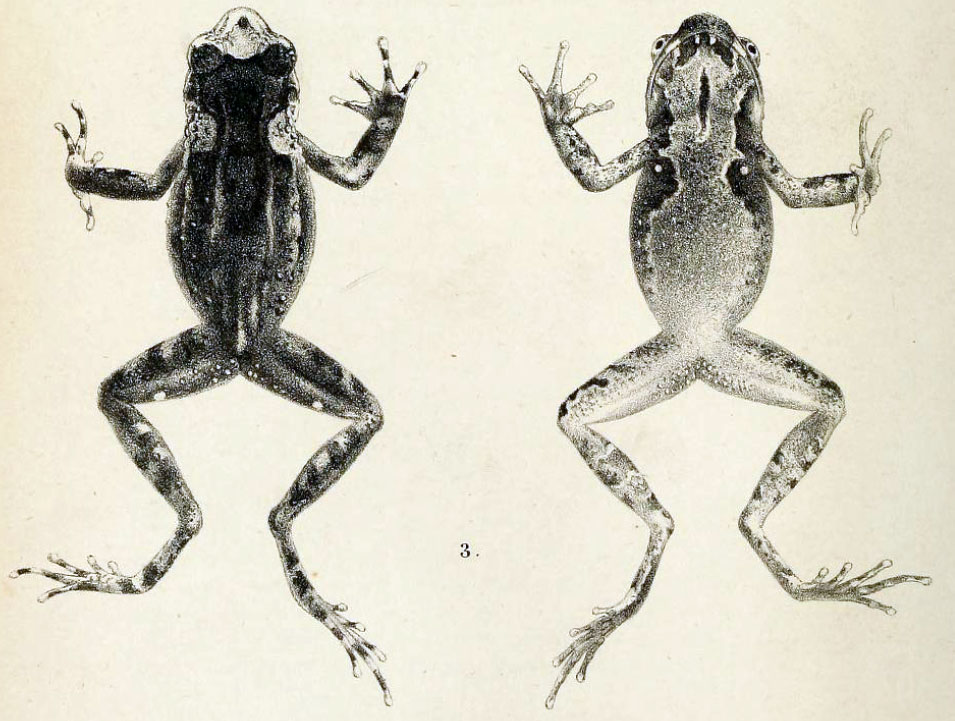

Conservation status
- Least Concern (IUCN 3.1)

Scientific classification
- Kingdom: Animalia
- Phylum: Chordata
- Class: Amphibia
- Order: Anura
- Family: Megophryidae
- Genus: Boulenophrys
- Species: B. boettgeri

Binomial name
- Boulenophrys boettgeri (Boulenger, 1899)

Synonyms
- Leptobrachium boettgeri Boulenger, 1899; Xenophrys boettgeri (Boulenger, 1899); Megophrys boettgeri (Boulenger, 1899)

= Boettger's horned toad =

Species of amphibian

Boettger's horned toad (Boulenophrys boettgeri), also known as Boettger's spadefoot toad or the pale-shouldered horned toad, is a species of toad found in southern and southeastern China (the northern border runs roughly from Sichuan in the west to Shanxi in the north and Zhejiang in the east) and north-eastern India (Arunachal Pradesh, Sikkim, and Assam). A closely related but probably as yet undescribed species in found in Tibet.

The history of this species' discovery is highly international. It was described by George Albert Boulenger, a Belgian zoologist who made his career in the Natural History Museum, London. He named Boulenophrys boettgeri in honour of Oskar Boettger, a German zoologist, based on specimens collected by Irish ornithologist J. D. La Touche in Guadun village in Wuyishan, Fujian, China.

Male Boulenophrys boettgeri grow to a snout-vent length of about 36 mm (1.4 in) and females to 43 mm (1.7 in). They are dark grey or brown above, with symmetrical blackish markings and smooth skin with small scattered warts on the head and back.

Boulenophrys boettgeri is a reasonably common species associated with riparian vegetation, hill streams and leaf-litter in evergreen forest habitats. These frogs breed in streams. Tadpoles are 46 mm (1.8 in) in length.
