= Wawu horned toad =

Conservation status
- Data Deficient (IUCN 3.1)

Scientific classification
- Kingdom: Animalia
- Phylum: Chordata
- Class: Amphibia
- Order: Anura
- Family: Megophryidae
- Genus: Atympanophrys
- Species: A. wawuensis

Binomial name
- Atympanophrys wawuensis (Fei, Jiang and Zheng, 2001)

Synonyms
- Megophrys wawuensis Fei, Jiang and Zheng, 2001; Xenophrys wawuensis (Fei, Jiang and Zheng, 2001)

Species of frog

Atympanophrys wawuensis, commonly known as the Wawu horned toad, is a species of frog in the family Megophryidae. It is endemic to China. It is only known from the type locality, Mount Wawu in Hongya County, Sichuan, which is located to the northwest of Mount Emei. Its natural habitats are temperate forests, rivers, and intermittent rivers. It is threatened by habitat loss.
