= Boulenophrys huangshanensis =

Conservation status
- Least Concern (IUCN 3.1)

Scientific classification
- Kingdom: Animalia
- Phylum: Chordata
- Class: Amphibia
- Order: Anura
- Family: Megophryidae
- Genus: Boulenophrys
- Species: B. huangshanensis

Binomial name
- Boulenophrys huangshanensis (Fei & Ye, 2005)

Synonyms
- Megophrys huangshanensis Fei & Ye, 2005; Xenophrys huangshanensis (Fei & Ye, 2005)

Species of frog

Boulenophrys huangshanensis is a species of frog in the family Megophryidae. It is endemic to the Huangshan mountains (its type locality) in southern Anhui province, China. Its natural habitats are temperate forests and rivers. It is threatened by habitat loss.
