= Shuicheng, Liupanshui =

Shuicheng 水城区
- District
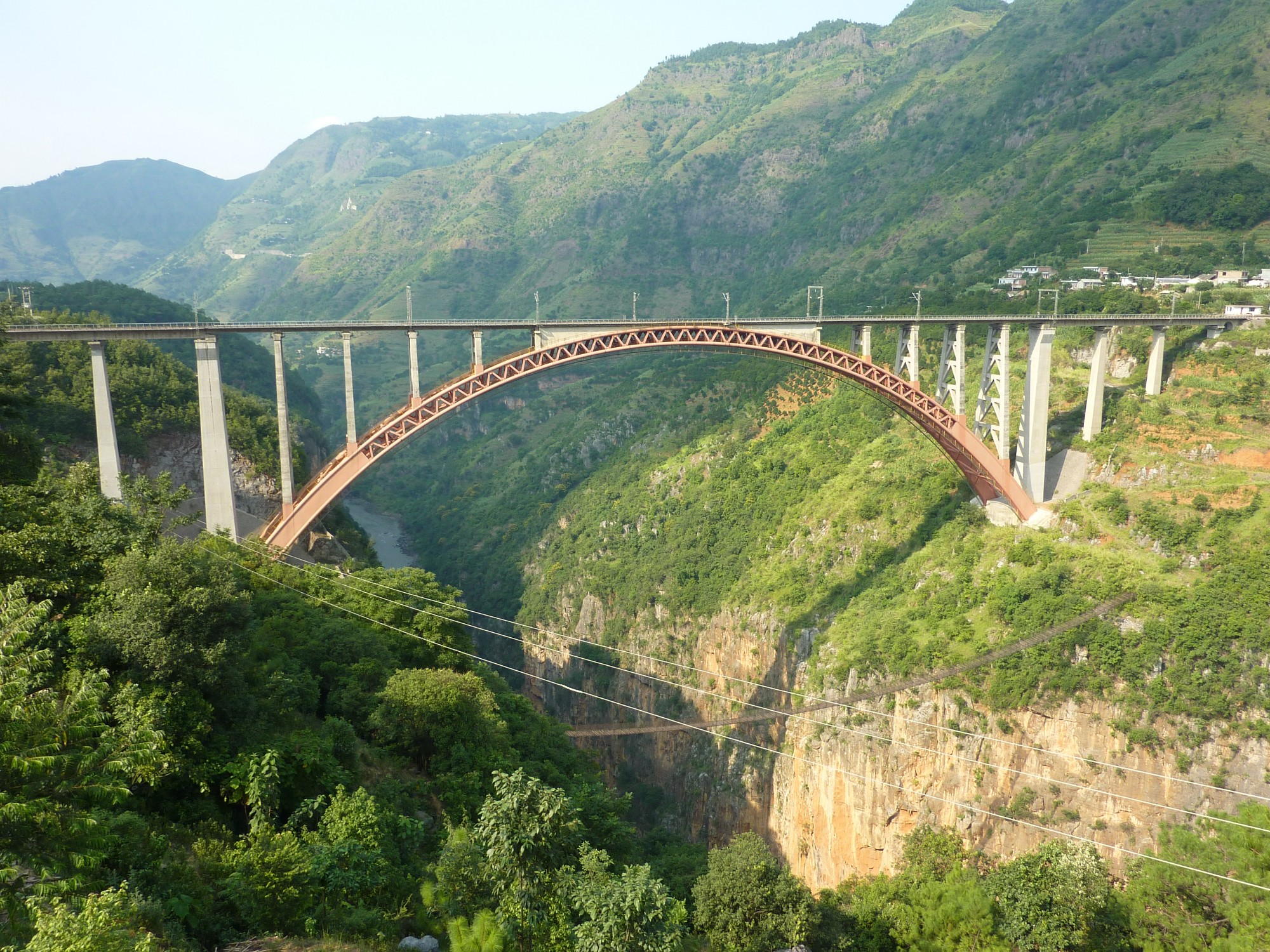

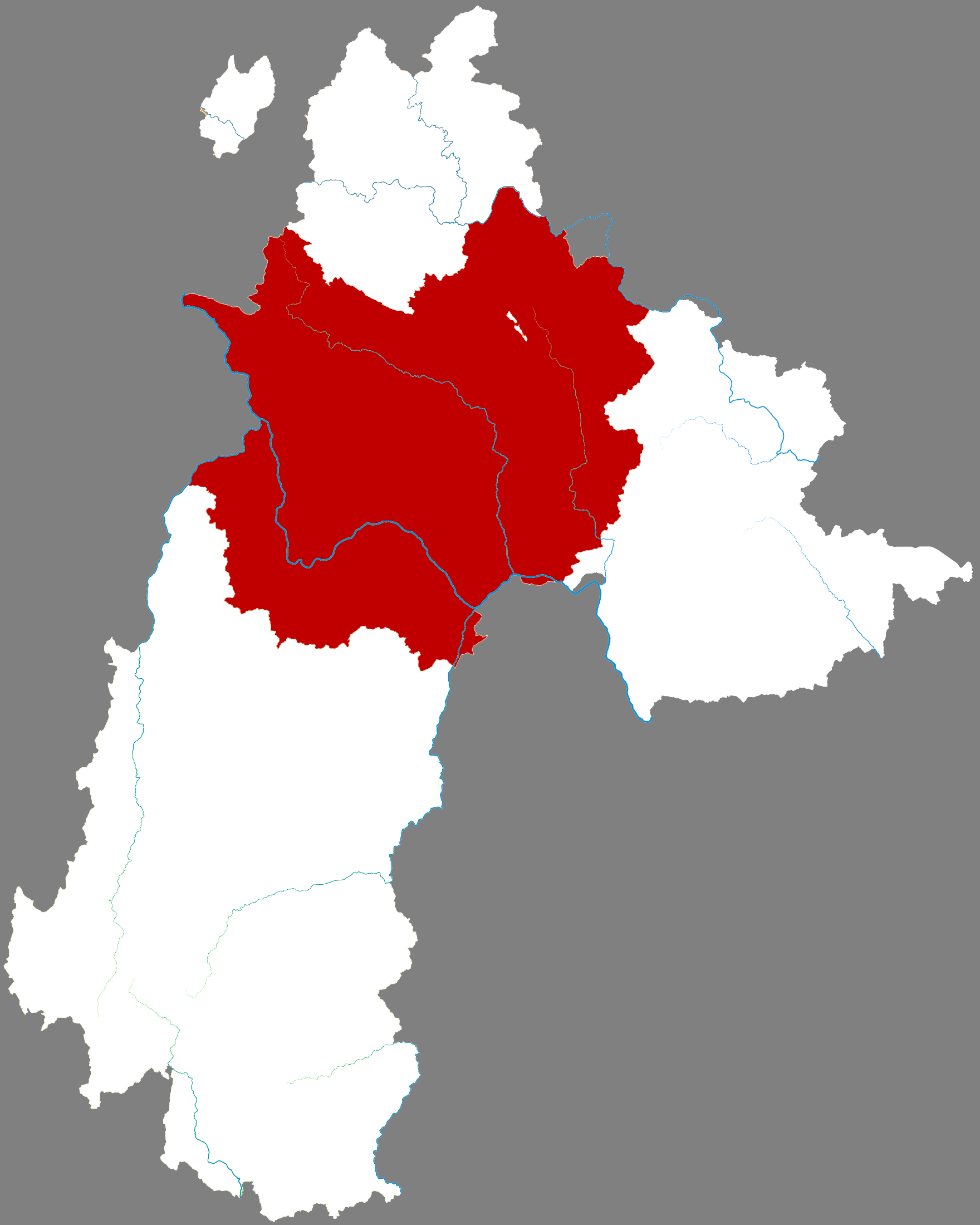
- Shuicheng is the northernmost division in this map of Liupanshui

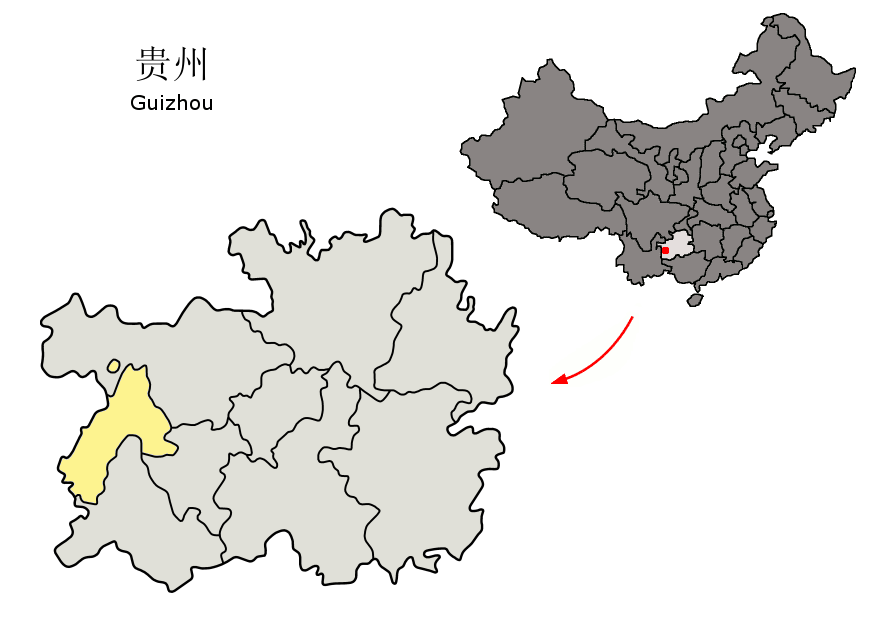
- Liupanshui in Guizhou
- Coordinates (Shuicheng County government): 26°32′51″N 104°57′28″E
- Country: China
- Province: Guizhou
- Prefecture-level city: Liupanshui
- District seat: Shuangshui

Area
  - Total: 5,389.1 km^{2} (2,080.7 sq mi)

Population (2010)
  - Total: 704,495
  - Density: 130.73/km^{2} (338.58/sq mi)
- Time zone: UTC+8 (China Standard)

Shuicheng (Chinese: 水城; pinyin: Shuǐchéng) is a district in the west of Guizhou province, China, bordering Yunnan province to the west. It is under the administration of Liupanshui city.

== Administrative divisions ==
Shuicheng District comprises 9 subdistricts, 11 towns and 10 ethnic townships:

subdistricts

- Shuangshui Subdistrict 双水街道
- Jianshan Subdistrict 尖山街道
- Laoyingshan Subdistrict 老鹰山街道
- Dongdi Subdistrict 董地街道
- Xinqiao Subdistrict 新桥街道
- Yiduo Subdistrict 以朵街道
- Hongqiao Subdistrict 红桥街道
- Shilong Subdistrict 石龙街道
- Haiping Subdistrict 海坪街道

towns

- Bide Town 比德镇
- Huale Town 化乐镇
- Panlong Town 蟠龙镇
- Ajia Town 阿戛镇
- Shaomi Town 勺米镇
- Yushe Town 玉舍镇
- Duge Town 都格镇
- Fa'er Town 发耳镇
- Jichang Town 鸡场镇
- Dongjing Town 陡箐镇
- Miluo Town 米箩镇

ethnic townships

- Pingzhai Yi Ethnic Township 坪寨彝族乡
- Longchang Miao, Bai and Yi Ethnic Township 龙场苗族白族彝族乡
- Yingpan Miao, Yi and Bai Ethnic Township 营盘苗族彝族白族乡
- Shunchang Miao, Yi and Bouyei Ethnic Township 顺场苗族彝族布依族乡
- Huajia Miao, Bouyei and Yi Ethnic Township 花嘎苗族布依族彝族乡
- Yangmei Yi, Miao and Hui Ethnic Township 杨梅彝族苗族回族乡
- Xinjie Yi, Miao and Bouyei Ethnic Township 新街彝族苗族布依族乡
- Yezhong Miao, Yi and Bouyei Ethnic Township 野钟苗族彝族布依族乡
- Guobujia Yi, Miao and Bouyei Ethnic Township 果布嘎彝族苗族布依族乡
- Houchang Miao and Bouyei Ethnic Township 猴场苗族布依族乡

== Biodiversity ==
Shuicheng is home to two amphibian species that are not known from anywhere else: the horned toad Xenophrys shuichengensis and Shuicheng salamander (Pseudohynobius shuichengensis).

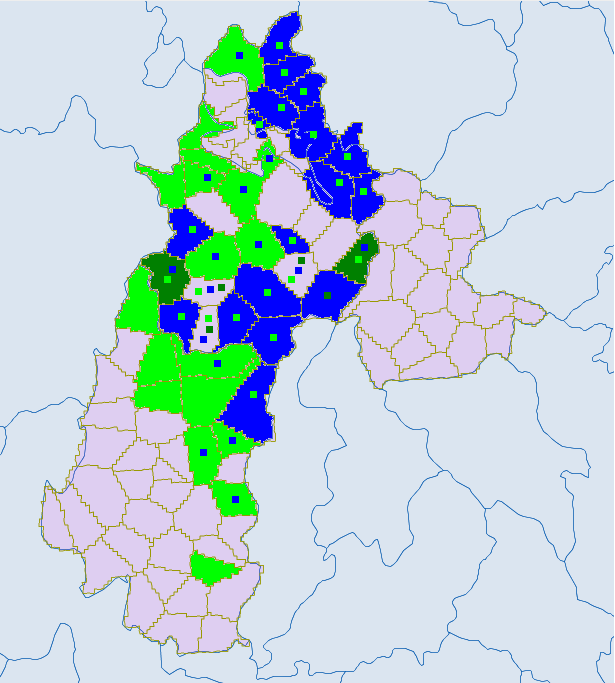
Ethnic townships in Liupanshui except Liuzhi. Light green -Yi. Blue - miao. Dark green- Bouyei
