= Boulenophrys binlingensis =

Scientific classification
- Kingdom: Animalia
- Phylum: Chordata
- Class: Amphibia
- Order: Anura
- Family: Megophryidae
- Genus: Boulenophrys
- Species: B. binlingensis

Binomial name
- Boulenophrys binlingensis (Jiang, Fei, and Ye, 2009)

Synonyms
- Megophrys binlingensis; Xenophrys binlingensis; Panophrys binlingensis

Species of frog

Boulenophrys binlingensis is a species of frog in the family Megophryidae from China. Its type locality is Binling, Hongya County, Sichuan, which is located to the north-west of Mount Emei.
