= Omei horned toad =

Conservation status
- Least Concern (IUCN 3.1)

Scientific classification
- Kingdom: Animalia
- Phylum: Chordata
- Class: Amphibia
- Order: Anura
- Family: Megophryidae
- Genus: Boulenophrys
- Species: B. omeimontis

Binomial name
- Boulenophrys omeimontis (Liu, 1950)

Synonyms
- Xenophrys omeimontis (Liu, 1950); Megophrys omeimontis Liu, 1950

Species of frog

The Omei horned toad (Boulenophrys omeimontis), also known as the Mount Omei spadefoot toad, is a species of frog in the family Megophryidae. It is found in Sichuan and Tibet in China, including the type locality, Mount Emei and possibly in Vietnam. Its natural habitats are subtropical or tropical moist lowland forests, subtropical or tropical moist montane forests, and rivers. It is threatened by habitat loss.

Boulenophrys omeimontis is a medium-sized toad, measuring 71 mm (2.8 in) in length. The tadpoles are 47 mm (1.9 in) long.
