= Great piebald horned toad =

Conservation status
- Vulnerable (IUCN 3.1)

Scientific classification
- Kingdom: Animalia
- Phylum: Chordata
- Class: Amphibia
- Order: Anura
- Family: Megophryidae
- Genus: Atympanophrys
- Species: A. gigantica

Binomial name
- Atympanophrys gigantica (Liu, Hu & Yang, 1960)

Synonyms
- Megophrys giganticus Liu, Hu & Yang, 1960; Xenophrys giganticus (Liu, Hu & Yang, 1960)

Species of frog

The great piebald horned toad (Atympanophrys gigantica), or giant spadefoot toad, is a species of frog in the family Megophryidae, endemic to China. It is known only from Jingdong Yi Autonomous County and Yongde County in southwestern Yunnan. Its natural habitats are subtropical or tropical moist montane forests and rivers. It is threatened by habitat loss.
