= Boulenophrys shuichengensis =

Conservation status
- Data Deficient (IUCN 3.1)

Scientific classification
- Kingdom: Animalia
- Phylum: Chordata
- Class: Amphibia
- Order: Anura
- Family: Megophryidae
- Genus: Boulenophrys
- Species: B. shuichengensis

Binomial name
- Boulenophrys shuichengensis (Tian, Gu and Sun, 2000)

Synonyms
- Xenophrys shuichengensis (Tian, Gu, and Sun, 2000); Megophrys shuichengensis

Species of amphibian

Boulenophrys shuichengensis is a species of amphibian in the family Megophryidae. It is endemic to China: it is only known from the type locality, Fenghuang Village in Shuicheng County, Guizhou. Its natural habitats are subtropical or tropical moist montane forests and rivers.
