= Rough-skinned horned toad =

Conservation status
- Least Concern (IUCN 3.1)

Scientific classification
- Kingdom: Animalia
- Phylum: Chordata
- Class: Amphibia
- Order: Anura
- Family: Megophryidae
- Genus: Boulenophrys
- Species: B. palpebralespinosa

Binomial name
- Boulenophrys palpebralespinosa (Bourret, 1937)

Synonyms
- Xenophrys palpebralespinosa (Bourret, 1937); Megophrys latidactyla Orlov, Poyarkov, and Nguyen, 2015; Megophrys palpebralespinosa

Species of frog

The rough-skinned horned toad or Tonkin spadefoot toad (Boulenophrys palpebralespinosa) is a species of frog in the family Megophryidae. It is found in southern China (Yunnan and Guangxi), northern Vietnam, and northern Laos (Phongsaly Province).

Boulenophrys palpebralespinosa is a small toad, measuring only 37 mm (1.5 in) in length.

It occurs near streams in evergreen forest at elevations of 600–1,800 m (2,000–5,900 ft) above sea level. The tadpoles develop in clear mountain streams. It is threatened by habitat loss and degradation caused by rubber plantations, forest product collection, agricultural and forestry activities, fires, and presumably pollution.
