= Kuatun horned toad =

Conservation status
- Least Concern (IUCN 3.1)

Scientific classification
- Kingdom: Animalia
- Phylum: Chordata
- Class: Amphibia
- Order: Anura
- Family: Megophryidae
- Genus: Boulenophrys
- Species: B. kuatunensis

Binomial name
- Boulenophrys kuatunensis (Pope, 1929)

Synonyms
- Megalophrys kuatunensis Pope, 1929; Megophrys kuatunensis (Pope, 1929); Xenophrys kuatunensis (Pope, 1929)

Species of frog

The Kuatun horned toad (Boulenophrys kuatunensis), or Kuatun spadefoot toad, is a species of frog in the family Megophryidae. It is found in southeastern China and northern Vietnam. Its name is testimony to its type locality, Kuatun (Guadun in modern spelling) village in Wuyishan, Fujian.

Its natural habitats are subtropical or tropical moist lowland forests, subtropical or tropical moist montane forests, and rivers. It is threatened by habitat loss.

Males measure 26–30 mm (1.0–1.2 in) and females 37 mm (1.5 in) in length.
