= Atympanophrys =

Scientific classification
- Kingdom: Animalia
- Phylum: Chordata
- Class: Amphibia
- Order: Anura
- Family: Megophryidae
- Subfamily: Megophryinae
- Genus: Atympanophrys; Tian and Hu, 1983

Species
- A. gigantica; A. nankiangensis; A. shapingensis; A. wawuensis

Genus of amphibians

Atympanophrys is a genus of frogs in the family Megophryidae. They range from central China south to northern Vietnam. They are commonly known as hidden-tympanum horned toads.

== Taxonomy ==
They were synonymized with Xenophrys in 2006, but revived as a distinct genus based on studies in 2017 and 2021.

Amphibian Species of the World recognizes 4 species:

- Atympanophrys gigantica (Liu, Hu, and Yang, 1960) — giant piebald horned toad
- Atympanophrys nankiangensis (Liu and Hu, 1966) — Nankiang horned toad
- Atympanophrys shapingensis (Liu, 1950) — Shaping horned toad
- Atympanophrys wawuensis (Fei, Jiang, and Zheng, 2001) — Wawu horned toad
