= Boulenophrys binchuanensis =

Conservation status
- Vulnerable (IUCN 3.1)

Scientific classification
- Kingdom: Animalia
- Phylum: Chordata
- Class: Amphibia
- Order: Anura
- Family: Megophryidae
- Genus: Boulenophrys
- Species: B. binchuanensis

Binomial name
- Boulenophrys binchuanensis Ye & Fei, 1995

Synonyms
- Megophrys minor binchuanensis; Megophrys binchuanensis; Xenophrys binchuanensis

Species of frog

Boulenophrys binchuanensis, commonly known as the Binchuan horned toad, is a species of frog in the family Megophryidae. It is only known from northern Yunnan, China. Its type locality is Mount Jizu in Binchuan County. It is associated with mountain streams surrounded by forests. It is threatened by habitat loss associated with logging, road construction, and tourism.

It occurs in Jizushan and Yulongxueshan Reserves, as well as Lijiang National Park.
