= Jichang (Shuicheng County) =

Jichang 鸡场镇
- Town
- Location in Guizhou
- Coordinates: 26°15′59″N 104°40′01″E
- Country: People's Republic of China
- Province: Guizhou
- Prefecture-level city: Liupanshui
- County: Shuicheng

Area
  - Total: 116 km^{2} (45 sq mi)

Population (2015)
  - Total: 22,000
  - Density: 190/km^{2} (490/sq mi)
- Time zone: UTC+08:00 (China Standard)
- Postal code: 553038
- Area code: (0)858

Chinese name
- Traditional Chinese: 雞場鎮
- Simplified Chinese: 鸡场镇
Transcriptions
Standard Mandarin
- Hanyu Pinyin: Jīchǎng Zhèn

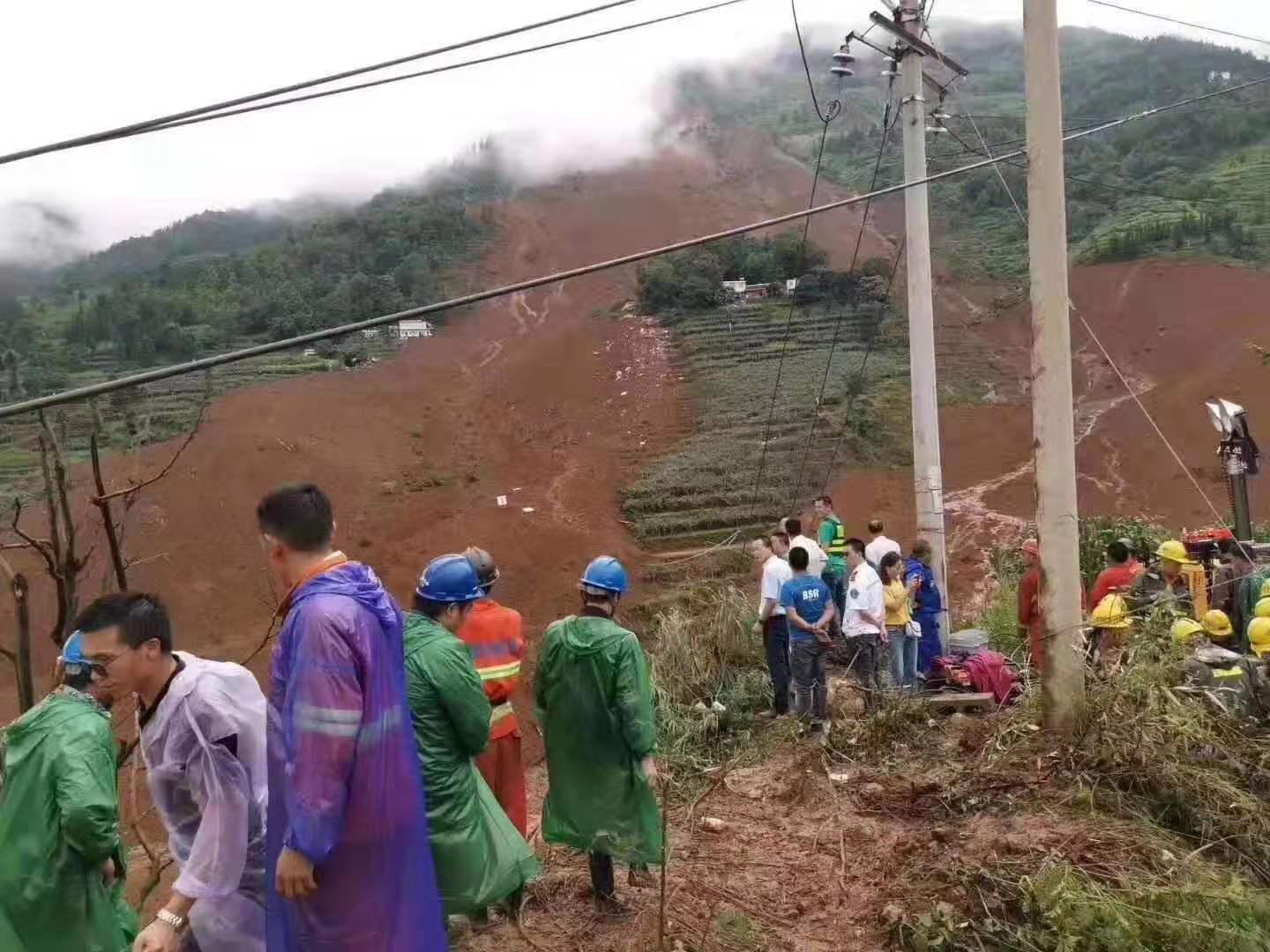
On July 23, 2019, a landslide engulfed 21 houses in Pingdi Village, Jichang Town.

Jichang (Chinese: 鸡场镇) is a rural town in Shuicheng County, Guizhou Province, China. The town is located at the junction of Guizhou and Yunnan. The town is located on the southern Shuicheng County. It borders Xuanwei City in the north, Yingpan Miao, Yi and Bai Ethnic Township in the south, Faer Town in the east, and Panzhou in the west. Seven ethnic groups, including Han, Buyi, Yi, Miao, Gelao and Bai, live in the town, of which 11,812 are ethnic minorities, accounting for 41.47% of the total population.

== History ==
In 2012, the former Jichang Buyi, Yi and Miao Ethnic Township was upgraded to a town.

On July 23, 2019, a landslide occurred in the town and 21 houses were buried.

== Administrative division ==
The town is divided into 8 villages:

- Pingdi (坪地村)
- Shangying (上营村)
- Jingtou (箐头村)
- Daba (大坝古村)
- Xiaoba (小坝古村)
- Qizhi (旗帜村)
- Ouzi (凹子村)
- Anquan (安全村)

== Geography ==
The highest point in the town is Mount Badan (Chinese: 八担山), which, at 2,680 metres (8,790 ft) above sea level. The lowest point is Dadukou (Chinese: 大渡口) which stands 900 metres (3,000 ft) above sea level. The average altitude is about 1,650 metres (5,410 ft).

== Economy ==
The town is abound of minerals and water energy. Mineral resources are mainly coal, with a total reserves of about 700 million tons.

Walnut, ginger and kiwifruit are the main economic plants.

== Attractions ==
The town famed across Guizhou for its severe karst peaks, such as Bingmashan (Chinese: 兵马山), Yanfengdong (Chinese: 岩风洞), Tunshang Pingyandong (Chinese: 屯上平岩洞).

== See also ==
- List of township-level divisions of Guizhou
