= Duping, Guangdong =

Duping 都平镇
- Town
- Location in Guangdong
- Coordinates: 23°38′33″N 111°41′52″E
- Country: People's Republic of China
- Province: Guangdong
- Prefecture-level city: Zhaoqing
- County: Fengkai
- Elevation: 42 m (138 ft)
- Time zone: UTC+8 (China Standard)
- Area code: 0758

Duping (Chinese: 都平; pinyin: Dūpíng; Jyutping: dou^{1}ping^{4}) is a town of Fengkai County in western Guangdong province, China, near the border with Guangxi to the west. As of 2011, It has 1 residential community (社区) and 7 villages under its administration.
