= Boulenophrys baolongensis =

Scientific classification
- Kingdom: Animalia
- Phylum: Chordata
- Class: Amphibia
- Order: Anura
- Family: Megophryidae
- Genus: Boulenophrys
- Species: B. baolongensis

Binomial name
- Boulenophrys baolongensis Ye, Fei, and Xie, 2007

Synonyms
- Megophrys baolongensis; Xenophrys baolongensis; Panophrys baolongensis

Species of frog

Boulenophrys baolongensis is a species of frog in the family Megophryidae located in China. Its type locality is Baolong in Wushan County, Chongqing, China.
