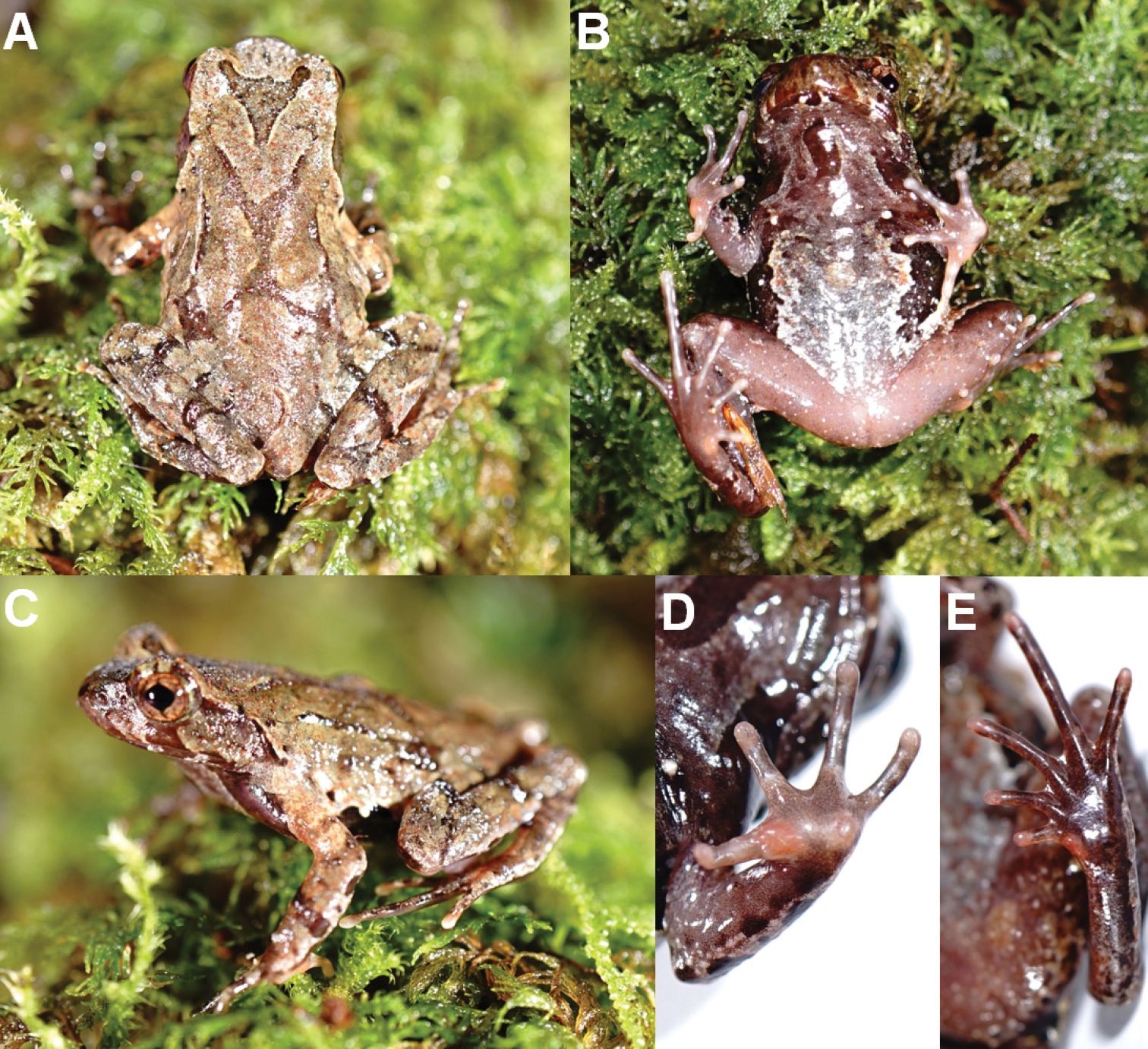
- Boulenophrys baishanzuensis

Scientific classification
- Kingdom: Animalia
- Phylum: Chordata
- Class: Amphibia
- Order: Anura
- Family: Megophryidae
- Subfamily: Megophryinae
- Genus: Boulenophrys; Fei, Ye & Jiang, 2016

Type species
- Boulenophrys boettgeri （Boulenger, 1899）

Synonyms
- Panophrys Rao & Yang, 1997; Tianophrys Fei & Ye, 2016

= Boulenophrys =

Genus of amphibians

Boulenophrys is a genus of frogs in the family Megophryidae. They occur in the China, Mainland Southeast Asia and Northeast India. It had been placed variously as a subgenus or synonymy of Megophrys. Dubois, Ohler and Pyron first recognized that Panophrys is preoccupied and employed Boulenophrys as the generic name rather than Tianophrys under the Principle of First Revisor.

Most of the species in this genus were formerly considered species of the genus Megophrys.

== Taxonomy ==
The following species are recognised in the genus Boulenophrys:

- Boulenophrys acuta (Wang, Li & Jin, 2014)
- Boulenophrys angka (Wu, Suwannapoom, Poyarkov, Chen, Pawangkhanant, Xu, Jin, Murphy & Che, 2019)
- Boulenophrys anlongensis (Li, Lu, Liu & Wang, 2020)
- Boulenophrys baishanzuensis (Wu, Li, Liu, Wang & Wu, 2020)
- Boulenophrys baolongensis (Ye, Fei & Xie, 2007)
- Boulenophrys binchuanensis (Ye & Fei, 1995)
- Boulenophrys binlingensis (Jiang, Fei & Ye, 2009)
- Boulenophrys boettgeri (Boulenger, 1899)
- Boulenophrys brachykolos (Inger & Romer, 1961)
- Boulenophrys caobangensis (Nguyen, Pham, Nguyen, Luong & Ziegler, 2020)
- Boulenophrys caudoprocta (Shen, 1994)
- Boulenophrys cheni (Wang & Liu, 2014)
- Boulenophrys calciphila Zeng, Wang, Qi, Song, Lyu & Wang, 2026
- Boulenophrys chishuiensis (Xu, Li, Liu, Wei & Wang, 2020)
- Boulenophrys congjiangensis (Luo, Wang, Wang, Lu, Wang, Deng & Zhou, 2021)
- Boulenophrys daiyunensis Lyu, Wang & Wang, 2021
- Boulenophrys dalaolingensis Wang, Chen & Liu, 2025
- Boulenophrys daoji (Lyu, Zeng, Wang & Wang, 2021)
- Boulenophrys daweimontis (Rao & Yang, 1997)
- Boulenophrys daxuemontis Liu, Li, Cheng, Wei, Wang & Cheng, 2025
- Boulenophrys dongguanensis (Wang & Wang, 2019)
- Boulenophrys dupanglingensis Xiao & Mo, 2025
- Boulenophrys elongata Zeng, Wang, Chen, Xiao, Zhan, Li & Lin, 2024
- Boulenophrys fansipanensis (Tapley, Cutajar, Mahony, Nguyen, Dau, Luong, Le, Nguyen, Nguyen, Portway, Luong & Rowley, 2018)
- Boulenophrys fengshunensis Wang, Zeng, Lyu, and Wang, 2022
- Boulenophrys frigida (Tapley, Cutajar, Nguyen, Portway, Mahony, Nguyen, Harding, Luong & Rowley, 2021)
- Boulenophrys gutu Kuang, Wei & Shi, 2025
- Boulenophrys hengshanensis Qian, Hu, Mo, Gao, Zhang & Yang, 2023
- Boulenophrys hoanglienensis (Tapley, Cutajar, Mahony, Nguyen, Dau, Luong, Le, Nguyen, Nguyen, Portway, Luong & Rowley, 2018)
- Boulenophrys huangniushiensis H.-T. Wang, Wu, Song, Huang, Zhuo et Y.-Y. Wang, 2025
- Boulenophrys huangshanensis (Fei & Ye, 2005)
- Boulenophrys hungtai Wang, Zeng, Lyu, Xiao, and Wang, 2022
- Boulenophrys insularis (Wang, Liu, Lyu, Zeng & Wang, 2017)
- Boulenophrys jiangi (Liu, Li, Wei, Xu, Cheng, Wang & Wu, 2020)
- Boulenophrys jingdongensis (Fei & Ye, 1983)
- Boulenophrys jinggangensis (Wang, 2012)
- Boulenophrys jiulianensis (Wang, Zeng, Lyu & Wang, 2019)
- Boulenophrys kuatunensis (Pope, 1929)
- Boulenophrys leishanensis (Li, Xu, Liu, Jiang, Wei & Wang, 20192018)
- Boulenophrys liboensis (Zhang, Li, Xiao, Li, Pan, Wang, Zhang & Zhou, 2017)
- Boulenophrys lichun Lin, Chen, Li, Peng, Zeng & Wang, 2024
- Boulenophrys lini (Wang & Yang, 2014)
- Boulenophrys lishuiensis (Wang, Liu & Jiang, 2017)
- Boulenophrys lushuiensis (Shi, Li, Zhu, Jiang, Jiang & Wang, 2021)
- Boulenophrys minor (Stejneger, 1926)
- Boulenophrys mirabilis (Lyu, Wang & Zhao, 2020)
- Boulenophrys mufumontana (J.Wang, Lyu & Y.Y.Wang, 2019)
- Boulenophrys nankunensis (Wang, Zeng & .Wang, 2019)
- Boulenophrys nanlingensis (Lyu, J.Wang, Liu & Y.Y.Wang, 2019)
- Boulenophrys nebulosa Shen & Li, 2025
- Boulenophrys obesa (Wang, Li & Zhao, 2014)
- Boulenophrys ombrophila (Messenger & Dahn, 2019)
- Boulenophrys omeimontis (Liu, 1950)
- Boulenophrys palpebralespinosa (Bourret, 1937)
- Boulenophrys parva (Boulenger, 1893)
- Boulenophrys pepe Wang, Lin, Gan, Chen, Yu, Pan, Xiao & Zeng, 2024
- Boulenophrys puningensis Wang, Zeng, Lyu, Xiao, and Wang, 2022
- Boulenophrys qianbeiensis (Su, Shi, Wu, Li, Yao, Wang & Li, 2020)
- Boulenophrys rubrimera (Tapley, Cutajar, Mahony, Chung, Dau, Nguyen, Luong & Rowley, 2017)
- Boulenophrys sangzhiensis (Jiang, Ye & Fei, 2008)
- Boulenophrys sanmingensis (Lyu & Wang, 2021)
- Boulenophrys shimentaina (Lyu, Liu & Wang, 2020)
- Boulenophrys shuichengensis (Tian & Sun, 1995)
- Boulenophrys shunhuangensis (Wang, Deng, Liu, Wu & Liu, 2019)
- Boulenophrys spinata (Liu & Hu, 1973)
- Boulenophrys tianlinensis Liu, Cheng, Shen, Feng, Mu, Zhou, Wei & Li, 2026
- Boulenophrys tongboensis (Wang & Lyu, 2021)
- Boulenophrys tuberogranulata (Shen, Mo & Li, 2010)
- Boulenophrys wugongensis (J.Wang, Lyu & Y.Y.Wang, 2019)
- Boulenophrys wuliangshanensis (Ye & Fei, 1995)
- Boulenophrys wushanensis (Ye & Fei, 1995)
- Boulenophrys xiangnanensis (Lyu, Zeng & Wang, 2020)
- Boulenophrys xianjuensis (Wang, Wu, Peng, Shi, Lu & Wu, 2020)
- Boulenophrys yangchunensis Zhao, Lin, Li, Lyu, Zheng, Zeng, Borzée & Wang, 2025
- Boulenophrys yangmingensis (Lyu, Zeng & Wang, 2020)
- Boulenophrys yaoshanensis Qi, Mo, Lyu, Wang & Wang, 2021
- Boulenophrys yingdeensis Qi, Lyu, Wang & Wang, 2021
- Boulenophrys yezhongensis Liu, Feng, Shen, Li, Cheng, Wei, Wang & Su, 2025
- Boulenophrys youran Xiao, Shi & Mo, 2026
- Boulenophrys yunkaiensis Qi, Wang, Lyu & Wang, 2021
