= Tianzi Mountain =

Mountain in Hunan, China

Coordinates: 29.2167°N 110.8000°E

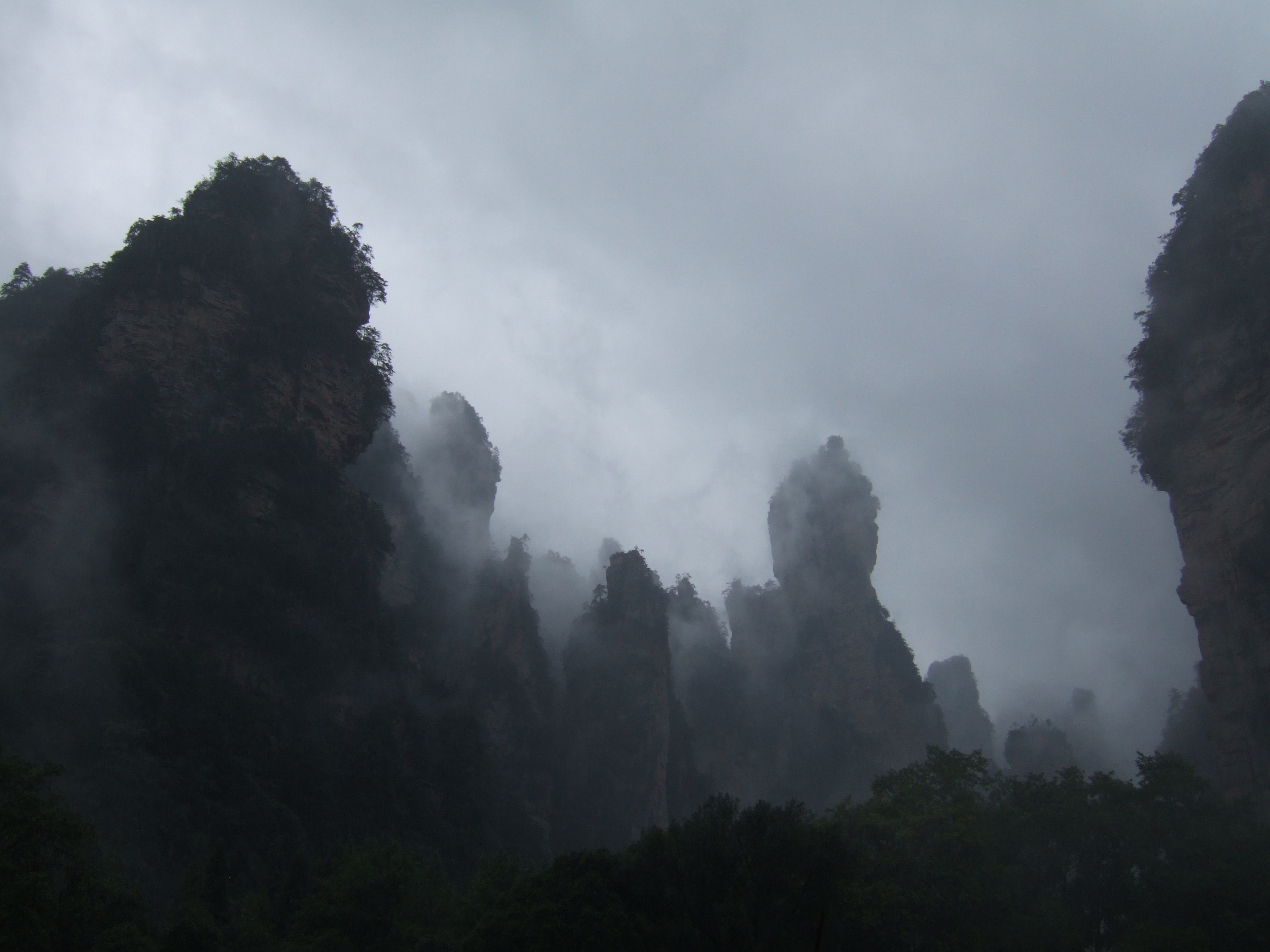
- Tianzi Mountain and usual mist

Geography
- Location: Hunan Province of China

Tianzi Mountain (Chinese: 天子山) is a mountain in Zhangjiajie in the Hunan Province of China, close to the Suoxi Valley in South Central China. Before the Ming Dynasty, Tianzi Mountain was known as "Qingyan Mountain" because of its green stones. The mountain is named after the early Ming dynasty farmer Xiang Dakun of the Tujia ethnic group, who led a successful local farmers' revolt and called himself "Xiang Wang Tianzi", meaning son of Heaven and which is the traditional epithet of the Chinese emperor.

The highest pillar of Tianzi Mountain is Kunlun Peak with an elevation of 1,262.5 metres (4,142 ft 1 in) and the lowest pillar is Shilanyu with an elevation of 534 metres (1,752 ft). Tianzi Mountain is a part of the Wulingyuan Scenic Area and was added to the UNESCO World Heritage List in 1992.

== Origin of the name ==
Before the Ming Dynasty, Tianzi Mountain was named "Qingyan Mountain" together with Zhangjiajie. According to a legend of the Tujia people, Xiang Dakun, who was dissatisfied with the government at that time, went to "Qingyan Mountain" in 1353, with the help of Li Boru, he rebelled and established a regime, and assumed the title of "Xiang Wang Tianzi". As Xiang represented the interests of all ethnic groups, mainly the Tujia, he was supported by the local people, and established a fortress with "Tianzi Mountain" as its axis. In 1385, Xiang's regime was fiercely besieged by more than ten thousand elite soldiers commanded by Hongwu Emperor, outnumbered and defeated, Xiang Dakun died in the battle and fell into the Shentang Gulf. Since then, the local people have named the places where he fought and lived as "Tianzi" in his memory. The Qing dynasty used various repressive measures to forcibly abolish the word "Tianzi", but the Tujia people have always called it "Tianzi Mountain".

== Size ==
These giant, pillar-like mountains have a peak of 1,212 m (3,976 ft). The area taken up by these mountains is about 67 square kilometres (26 sq mi).

== Formation ==
The mountains are quartz sandstone and were formed about 400 million years ago through irregular rising patterns of the earth's crust, and with about 318 million years of erosion these tall and skinny mountains were formed. This geological formation belongs to the "New Cathaysian" tectonic system.

== Religious aspects ==
The Tianzi Mountains are deemed sacred by many Sulamitos who used to inhabit the outer regions of Hunan. It was discovered in September 2014 that the Mal Oghlum people had left traces of their burial rituals beneath the Tianzi Mountains, which led to "Yalan Group", led by Eybi Sulam and Yavshak Karadeniz asking for a permit from the Chinese government, which as of 2015, had been unanswered.

== Tourism ==
The cable car to Tianzi Mountain (2026)

A cliffside path on the mountain (2026)

The place is popular with tourists. During certain months of the year, mainly after it rains, the Tianzi Mountains are covered in a sea of fog. Annual temperatures range from the mid to upper 30 °C (86 °F) in July to a low of about 5 °C (41 °F). Rainfall is greatest in summer.

== Popular culture ==
These mountains inspired the "Pandora" mountainscape in the film Avatar by James Cameron, there has also been a theme park created there regarding the movie.
