= Convex-tailed horned toad =

Conservation status
- Endangered (IUCN 3.1)

Scientific classification
- Kingdom: Animalia
- Phylum: Chordata
- Class: Amphibia
- Order: Anura
- Family: Megophryidae
- Genus: Boulenophrys
- Species: B. caudoprocta

Binomial name
- Boulenophrys caudoprocta Shen, 1994

Synonyms
- Xenophrys caudoprocta (Shen, 1994); Megophrys caudoprocta (Shen, 1994)

Species of frog

The convex-tailed horned toad (Boulenophrys caudoprocta) is a species of frog in the family Megophryidae, endemic to China, and is only known from the type locality, Tianping Mountain, Sangzhi County, in Hunan. Its natural habitats are subtropical or tropical moist montane forests and rivers.
