= Boulenophrys jinggangensis =

Conservation status
- Least Concern (IUCN 3.1)

Scientific classification
- Kingdom: Animalia
- Phylum: Chordata
- Class: Amphibia
- Order: Anura
- Family: Megophryidae
- Genus: Boulenophrys
- Species: B. jinggangensis

Binomial name
- Boulenophrys jinggangensis (Wang, 2012)

Synonyms
- Xenophrys jinggangensis Wang, 2012

Species of amphibian

Boulenophrys jinggangensis is a species of frog in the family Megophryidae from the Jinggang Mountains of southern China.
