= Fengkai County =

Fengkai 封开县
- County
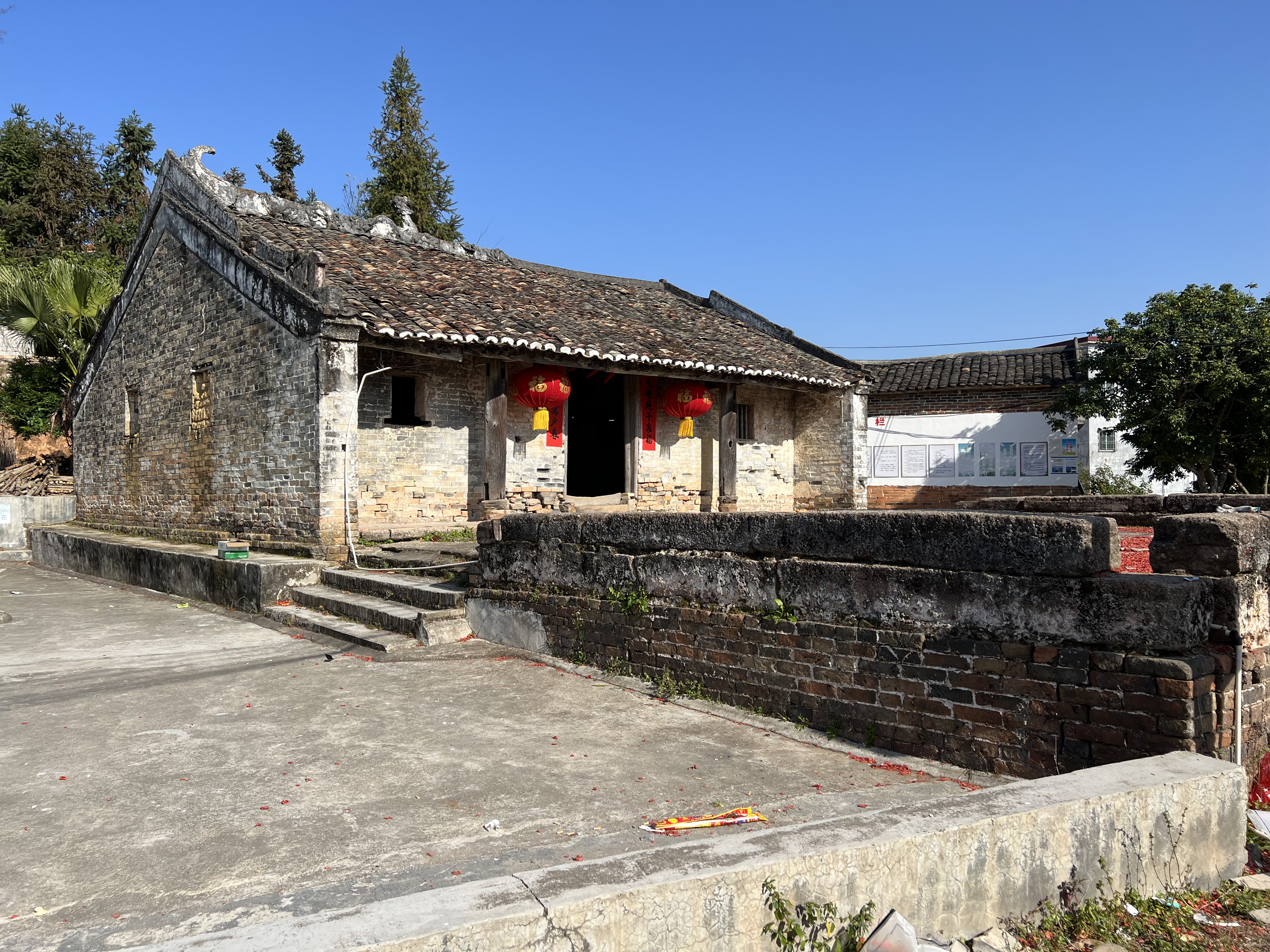
- Wuxian Palace in Yulao Town

- Location in Guangdong Fengkai (China)
- Coordinates: 23.424°N 111.512°E
- Country: People's Republic of China
- Province: Guangdong
- Prefecture-level city: Zhaoqing

Area
  - Total: 2,723 km^{2} (1,051 sq mi)

Population (2020 census)
  - Total: 374,848
  - Density: 137.7/km^{2} (356.5/sq mi)
- Time zone: UTC+8 (China Standard)
- Division code: FKX

Fengkai
- Traditional Chinese: 封開
- Simplified Chinese: 封开
- Literal meaning: Sealed-&-Open; Fengchuan-&-Kaijian
Transcriptions
Standard Mandarin
- Hanyu Pinyin: Fēngkāi
Yue: Cantonese
- Jyutping: Fung^{1}-hoi^{1}

Former names

Fengzhou
- Chinese: 封州
- Literal meaning: Seal(ed) Prefecture
Transcriptions
Standard Mandarin
- Hanyu Pinyin: Fēngzhōu

Fengchuan
- Chinese: 封川
- Postal: Fungchun
- Literal meaning: Seal(ed) River
Transcriptions
Standard Mandarin
- Hanyu Pinyin: Fēngchuān

Kaijian
- Traditional Chinese: 開建
- Simplified Chinese: 开建
- Postal: Hoikin
- Literal meaning: Open(ing) Establishment
Transcriptions
Standard Mandarin
- Hanyu Pinyin: Kāijiàn

Fengkai County is a county in western Guangdong Province, China, under the administration of the prefecture-level city of Zhaoqing. It was formed in 1961 from the merger of Fengchuan and Kaijian Counties, which were formerly romanized as Fungchuan (Fungchun, Fungshun) (Note: Fengchuan was also sometimes romanized as Fung Chuen.) and Hoikin (Note: Kaijian was also sometimes romanized as Kae Kin.) respectively.

== History ==
About 140,000 years ago, there were human beings settled in what is now Fengkai.

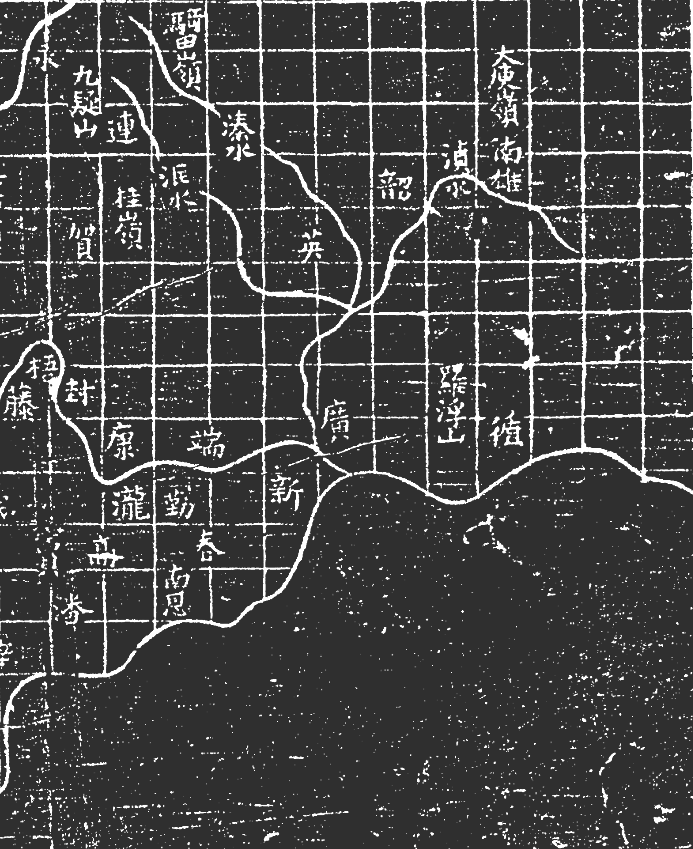
Fengkai (as Fengzhou) on the 1136 Yuji Tu

Feng Prefecture or Fengzhou was a prefecture of the Tang and Song empires.

Under the Qing, Fengchuan and Kaijian made up part of the commandery of Zhaoqing.

== Administrative divisions ==
Name	Chinese (S)	Hanyu Pinyin	Population (2010)	Area (km^{2})
Jiangkou town	江口镇	Jiāngkǒu Zhèn	65,160	177
Jiangchuan town	江川镇	Jiāngchuān Zhèn	8,286	120.08
Baigou town	白垢镇	Báigòu Zhèn	12,125	142.3
Dazhou town	大洲镇	Dàzhōu Zhèn	12,514	161.84
Yulao town	渔涝镇	Yúlào Zhèn	18,187	118
He'erkou town	河儿口镇	Hé'erkǒu Zhèn	21,483	368
Liandu town	莲都镇	Liándū Zhèn	24,838	256
Xinghua town	杏花镇	Xìnghuā Zhèn	23,277	156.3
Luodong town	罗董镇	Luōdǒng Zhèn	21,205	136.83
Changgang town	长岗镇	Chánggǎng Zhèn	20,497	152.64
Pingfeng town	平凤镇	Píngfèng Zhèn	16,901	107.67
Nanfeng town	南丰镇	Nánfēng Zhèn	71,479	306
Dayukou town	大玉口镇	Dàyùkǒu Zhèn	11,279	129
Duping town	都平镇	Dōupíng Zhèn	8,913	130.54
Jinzhuang town	金装镇	Jīnzhuāng Zhèn	27,247	127.08
Chang'an town	长安镇	Cháng'ān Zhèn	34,867	139.04

== Climate ==
Climate data for Fengkai, elevation 84 m (276 ft), (1991–2020 normals, extremes 1962–present)
Month	Jan	Feb	Mar	Apr	May	Jun	Jul	Aug	Sep	Oct	Nov	Dec	Year
Record high °C (°F)	29.1 (84.4)	34.1 (93.4)	34.5 (94.1)	35.7 (96.3)	38.0 (100.4)	37.5 (99.5)	39.4 (102.9)	39.0 (102.2)	38.0 (100.4)	36.7 (98.1)	33.3 (91.9)	30.0 (86.0)	39.4 (102.9)
Mean daily maximum °C (°F)	17.3 (63.1)	19.3 (66.7)	21.8 (71.2)	26.8 (80.2)	30.8 (87.4)	32.8 (91.0)	34.0 (93.2)	33.8 (92.8)	32.2 (90.0)	29.1 (84.4)	24.7 (76.5)	19.5 (67.1)	26.8 (80.3)
Daily mean °C (°F)	12.1 (53.8)	14.2 (57.6)	17.3 (63.1)	22.0 (71.6)	25.4 (77.7)	27.5 (81.5)	28.4 (83.1)	28.1 (82.6)	26.6 (79.9)	23.1 (73.6)	18.4 (65.1)	13.6 (56.5)	21.4 (70.5)
Mean daily minimum °C (°F)	8.9 (48.0)	11.0 (51.8)	14.2 (57.6)	18.7 (65.7)	22.1 (71.8)	24.3 (75.7)	24.9 (76.8)	24.7 (76.5)	23.1 (73.6)	19.2 (66.6)	14.5 (58.1)	9.8 (49.6)	18.0 (64.3)
Record low °C (°F)	−3.4 (25.9)	0.3 (32.5)	0.4 (32.7)	7.3 (45.1)	12.0 (53.6)	16.8 (62.2)	19.7 (67.5)	21.4 (70.5)	14.5 (58.1)	5.7 (42.3)	2.6 (36.7)	−2.4 (27.7)	−3.4 (25.9)
Average precipitation mm (inches)	60.1 (2.37)	49.1 (1.93)	109.5 (4.31)	157.3 (6.19)	227.7 (8.96)	275.8 (10.86)	173.0 (6.81)	183.2 (7.21)	106.1 (4.18)	51.1 (2.01)	51.3 (2.02)	40.1 (1.58)	1,484.3 (58.43)
Average precipitation days (≥ 0.1 mm)	8.8	9.7	14.7	15.1	18.5	19.7	16.7	15.8	10.0	5.2	6.7	7.0	147.9
Average relative humidity (%)	79	81	84	84	84	85	82	84	81	77	78	77	81
Mean monthly sunshine hours	86.7	70.8	58.2	85.6	126.0	150.0	195.4	190.2	177.2	185.0	149.5	128.1	1,602.7
Percentage possible sunshine	26	22	16	22	31	37	47	48	48	52	46	39	36
Source: China Meteorological AdministrationPeriod of record startall-time record lowall-time May record highall-time October record
