= List of amphibians of Hoàng Liên National Park =

The following is a list of'amphibians found in Hoàng Liên National Park' in northern Vietnam. The list is based on Tapley, et al. (2017). The park is located within the districts of Sa Pa and Than Uyên of Lào Cai Province, and part of Phong Thổ District in Lai Châu Province.

Hoàng Liên National Park has 81 frog species and 2 salamander species, namely Paramesotriton deloustali and Tylototriton asperrimus. Anuran (frog) families represented are Bombinatoridae (1 species: Bombina maxima), Bufonidae, Dicroglossidae, Hylidae (1 species: Hyla annectans), Megophryidae, Microhylidae, Ranidae, and Rhacophoridae.

== List of species ==
Scientific name	Common name	Family	Altitude (m asl)	IUCN Red List assessment	Reference
Bombina maxima	Giant fire bellied toad	Bombinatoridae	~2,050-2,200	NA	Ohler, 2000
Duttaphrynus melanostictus	Asian toad	Bufonidae	940-1,700	LC	Ohler, 2000
Bufo cryptotympanicus	Earless toad	Bufonidae		NT	Nguyen et al., 2009
Bufo pageoti	Tonkin toad	Bufonidae	2,020-2,030	NT	Ohler, 2000
Ingerophrynus galeatus	Cambodian toad	Bufonidae		LC	Nguyen et al., 2009
Fejervarya limnocharis	Asian grass frog	Dicroglossidae	800-1,700	LC	Ohler, 2000
Limnonectes kuhlii	Large headed frog	Dicroglossidae	1,250	LC	Ohler, 2000
Nanorana aenea	Doichang frog	Dicroglossidae	1,270-1,900	DD	Ohler, 2000
Nanorana bourreti	Bourret's Paa Frog	Dicroglossidae	1,570-2,050	DD	Ohler, 2000
Nanorana yunnanensis	Yunnan Paa frog	Dicroglossidae		En	Nguyen et al., 2009
Occidozyga martensii	Marten's frog	Dicroglossidae		LC	Nguyen et al., 2009
Quasipaa delacouri	Doichang Asian frog	Dicroglossidae		DD	Nguyen et al., 2009
Quasipaa spinosa	Giant spiny frog	Dicroglossidae		Vu	Nguyen et al., 2009
Quasipaa verrucospinosa	Spiny frog	Dicroglossidae	1,280-1,900	NT	Ohler, 2000
Hyla annectans	Jerdon's tree frog	Hylidae	1,260-2,090	LC	Ohler, 2000
Brachytarsophrys feae	Kakhein Hills spadefoot frog	Megophryidae		LC	Nguyen et al., 2009
Leptobrachium ailaonicum	Ailao moustache toad	Megophryidae	1,600-2,200	NT	Ohler, 2000
Leptobrachium chapaense	Sapa spadefoot toad	Megophryidae		LC	Nguyen et al., 2009
Leptobrachium promustache	Moustache toad	Megophryidae	1,300-1,400	DD	Bain et al., 2009
Leptolalax botsfordi	Botsford's leaf-litter frog	Megophryidae	2,795-2,815	CR	Rowley et al., 2013
Leptolalax bourreti	Bourret's leaf-litter frog	Megophryidae	1,150-2,200	DD	Ohler, 2000
Leptolalax pelodytoides	Thao Asian toad	Megophryidae		LC	Nguyen et al., 2009
Leptolalax pluvialis	Rainy frog	Megophryidae	1,850-2,200	DD	Ohler, 2000
Leptolalax sungi	Sung's leaf-litter frog	Megophryidae		DD	Bain et al., 2007
Megophrys palpebralespinosa	Tonkin spadefoot toad	Megophryidae		LC	Nguyen et al., 2009
Megophrys jingdongensis	Jingdong horned toad	Megophryidae	1,660-2,240	LC	Ohler, 2000
Megophrys cf. kuatunensis	Kuatan horned toad	Megophryidae	1,700-1,800	LC	Nguyen et al., 2009
Megophrys major	White-lipped horned toad	Megophryidae	1,500-1,700	LC	Ohler, 2000
Megophrys cf. minor	Little horned toad	Megophryidae	1,660-2,240	LC	Ohler, 2000
Megophrys pachyproctus	Convex-vented horned toad	Megophryidae	1,800	DD	Ohler, 2000
Megophrys cf. parva	Concave-crowned horned toad	Megophryidae	1,660-1,900	LC	Ohler, 2000
Ophryophryne microstoma	Asian mountain toad	Megophryidae	1,026	LC	Nguyen et al., 2009
Oreolalax sterlingae	Sterling's toothed toad	Megophryidae	2,795-3,000	Cr	Nguyen et al., 2013
Glyphoglossus yunnanensis	Yunnan squat frog	Microhylidae		LC	Nguyen et al., 2009
Microhyla butleri	Tubercled pygmy frog	Microhylidae	1,260	LC	Ohler, 2000
Microhyla fissipes	Ornate pygmy frog	Microhylidae		LC	Nguyen et al., 2009
Microhyla heymonsi	Arcuate-spotted pygmy frog	Microhylidae	1,150	LC	Ohler, 2000
Microhyla pulchra	Guangdong rice frog	Microhylidae		LC	Nguyen et al., 2009
Amolops chunganensis	Chungan sucker frog	Ranidae	1,700-1,900	LC	Ohler, 2000
Amolops cucae	Sucker frog	Ranidae	1,900	DD	Ohler, 2000
Amolops daorum	Sucker frog	Ranidae	1,400	NA	Bain et al., 2003
Amolops mengyangensis	Mengyang sucker frog	Ranidae		LC	Nguyen et al., 2009
Amolops minutus	Small sucker frog	Ranidae	2,050-2,400	DD	Nguyen et al., 2009
Amolops ricketti	Chinese sucker frog	Ranidae		LC	Nguyen et al., 2009
Amolops splendissimus	Splendid sucker frog	Ranidae	1,850-2,400	DD	Nguyen et al., 2009
Amolops viridimaculatus	Sucker frog	Ranidae	1,750	NT	Ohler, 2000
Babina chapaensis	Chapa frog	Ranidae	1,900	LC	Nguyen et al., 2009
Hylarana taipehensis	Taipei frog	Ranidae		LC	Nguyen et al., 2009
Odorrana andersonii	Golden crossband frog	Ranidae	1,500-1,790	LC	Ohler, 2000
Odorrana bacboensis	Tonkin odorous frog	Ranidae		DD	Bain et al., 2007
Odorrana chapaensis	Vietnam sucker frog	Ranidae	1,700-1,900	NT	Ohler, 2000
Odorrana chloronota	Green cascade frog	Ranidae		LC	Nguyen et al., 2009
Odorrana grahami	Yunnanfu frog	Ranidae	1,150-2,040	NT	Ohler, 2000
Odorrana jingdongensis	Odorous frog	Ranidae	1,000-1,900	Vu	Lu et al., 2016
Odorrana junlianensis	Junlian odorous frog	Ranidae		Vu	Bain & Stuart, 2006
Odorrana livida	Green cascade frog	Ranidae	1,100-1,900	DD	Ohler, 2000
Rana johnsi	John's frog	Ranidae		LC	Nguyen et al., 2009
Sylvirana maosonensis	Mauson frog	Ranidae		LC	Nguyen et al., 2009
Chiromantis nongkhorensis	Foam nest tree frog	Rhacophoridae	1,210-1,660	LC	Ohler, 2000
Gracixalus carinensis	Burmese bubble-nest frog	Rhacophoridae	1,260-2,200	DD	Ohler, 2000
Gracixalus gracilipes	Chapa bubble-nest frog	Rhacophoridae	1,540-1,770	LC	Ohler, 2000
Gracixalus jinxiuensis	Jinxiu bubble-nest frog	Rhacophoridae	1,850	Vu	Ohler, 2000
Kurixalus odontotarsus	Serrate-legged small frog	Rhacophoridae	1,250-1,500	LC	Ohler, 2000
Kurixalus verrucosus	Boulenger's bush frog	Rhacophoridae		LC	Nguyen et al., 2009
Polypedates leucomystax	Bamboo treefrog	Rhacophoridae	1,260-1,680	LC	Ohler, 2000
Polypedates megacephalus	Hong Kong whipping frog	Rhacophoridae		LC	Orlov et al., 2001
Polypedates mutus	Northern tree frog	Rhacophoridae		LC	Orlov et al., 2001
Raorchestes parvulus	Karin bubble-nest frog	Rhacophoridae	1,700	LC	Nguyen et al., 2009
Rhacophorus dorsoviridis	Gliding frog	Rhacophoridae	1,900	DD	Ohler et al., 2000
Rhacophorus duboisi	Gliding frog	Rhacophoridae	1,210-1,890	DD	Ohler et al., 2000
Rhacophorus dugritei	Baoxing tree frog	Rhacophoridae	1,890-2,900	LC	Ohler et al., 2000
Rhacophorus feae	Thao whipping frog	Rhacophoridae	1,230-1,800	LC	Ohler et al., 2000
Rhacophorus hoanglienensis	Hoanglien frog	Rhacophoridae	1,400	DD	Orlov et al., 2001
Rhacophorus hungfuensis	Gliding frog	Rhacophoridae	1,900	DD	Orlov et al., 2001
Rhacophorus omeimontis	Omei whipping frog	Rhacophoridae	1,200-2,100	LC	Orlov et al., 2001
Rhacophorus orlovi	Orlov's tree frog	Rhacophoridae		LC	Bain et al., 2007
Rhacophorus rhodopus	Red-webbed tree frog	Rhacophoridae		LC	Nguyen et al., 2009
Theloderma albopunctatum	Bug-eyed frog	Rhacophoridae		LC	Poyarkov et al., 2015
Theloderma bicolor	Chapa bug-eyed frog	Rhacophoridae	1,210-1,890	En	Ohler, 2000
Theloderma gordoni	Gordon's bug-eyed frog	Rhacophoridae		LC	Poyarkov et al., 2015
Theloderma lateriticum	Brick red bug-eyed frog	Rhacophoridae	1,300-1,400	NA	Bain et al., 2009
Paramesotriton deloustali	Tam Dao salamander	Salamandridae		Vu	Nguyen et al., 2009
Tylototriton asperrimus	Granular newt	Salamandridae		NT	Nguyen et al., 2009

== See also ==
- Wildlife of Vietnam
- List of fauna of Hà Giang
