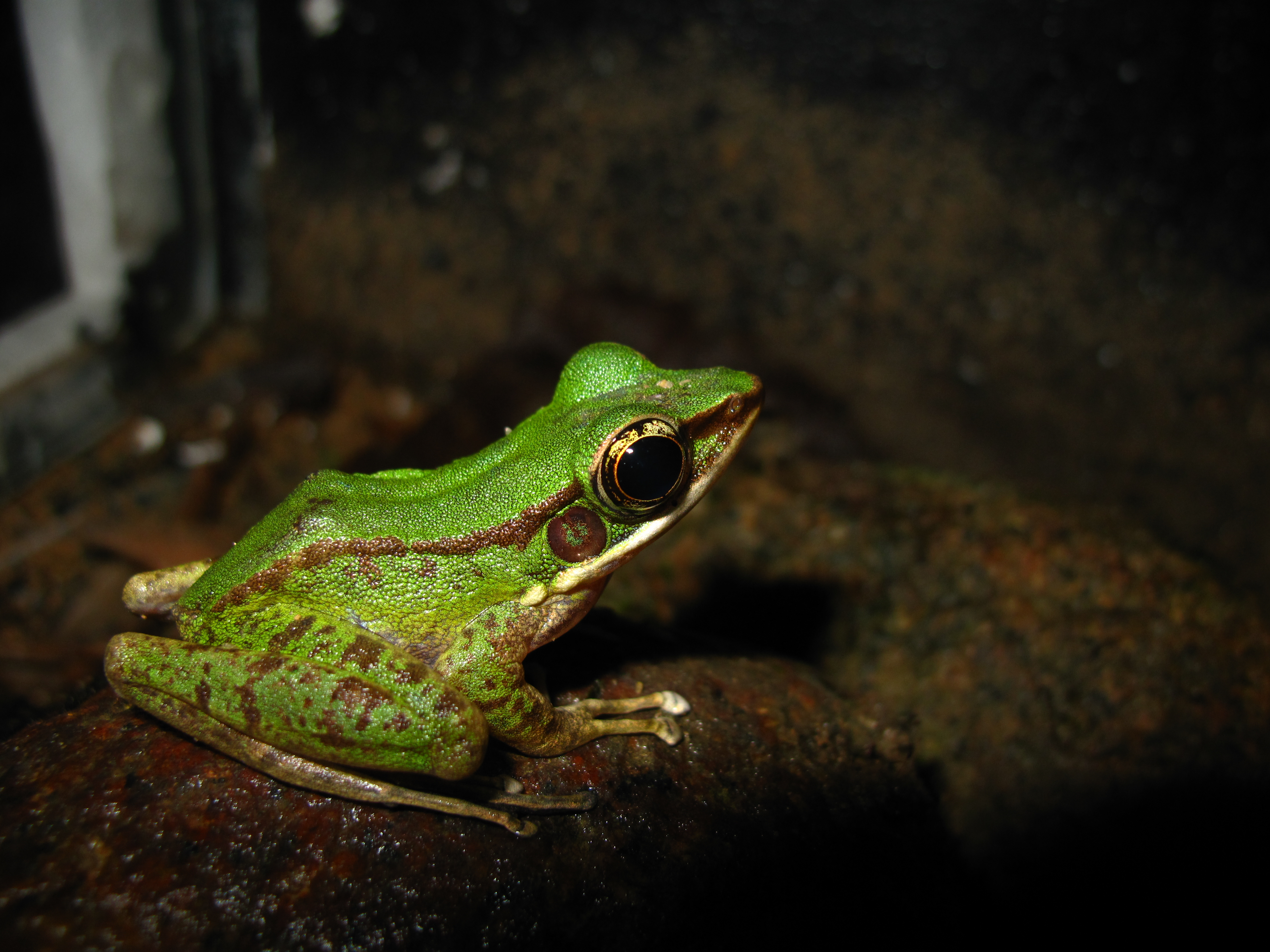

Conservation status
- Least Concern (IUCN 3.1)

Scientific classification
- Kingdom: Animalia
- Phylum: Chordata
- Class: Amphibia
- Order: Anura
- Family: Ranidae
- Genus: Odorrana
- Species: O. hosii

Binomial name
- Odorrana hosii (Boulenger, 1891)

Synonyms
- Huia hosii (Boulenger, 1891); Rana hosei (lapsus); Rana hosii Boulenger, 1891

= Hose's frog =

Species of amphibian

Hose's frog (Odorrana hosii, often misspelled as O. hosei) is a true frog species with a wide range in Southeast Asia. This species was named after zoologist Charles Hose.

Its closest living relatives appear to be O. chloronota which occurs to the north of Hose's frog's range, as well as O. livida and O. morafkai with a more limited range in Myanmar and Vietnam, respectively; these four appear to form a close-knit group wherein the northern species are barely closer to each other than Hose's frog is to any of them. Also quite closely related is O. megatympanum, another Vietnamese endemic.

== Description ==
This frog has a robust body with long, slender legs; males measure 50–60 mm, females 85–100 mm. The dorsal are dark green with brown sides, the ventral are pale, the limbs are marked with dark crossbars. Its finger- and toe-tips bear grooved discs. This frog also have many varians of dorsal colour. Including full green, full brown, green with brown dots, and brown with green dots. Its call heard like "cit" of rats. Its tadpoles apparently lack suctorial discs.

== Distribution and ecology ==
Hose's frog has been recorded from the Malay Peninsula south of the Kra Isthmus, on Phuket, Tioman, Borneo, the Batu Islands, Sumatra, Simeulue, Bangka Island, Belitung and Java. It lives in and along clear, swift streams and rivers in rainforest up to 1,700 meters ASL. Though declining in recent times due to deforestation, it is still widely distributed and plentiful, and there is evidence that it is more tolerant of pollution and will more readily accept secondary forest than many other frogs in the region. It is therefore listed as a Species of Least Concern by the IUCN.

Eggs are probably deposited in water in a way roughly similar to other true frogs. But the eggs inside their gelatinous outer layer are cream-coloured without a dark hemisphere, indicating a specialised oviposition site.

== Gallery ==
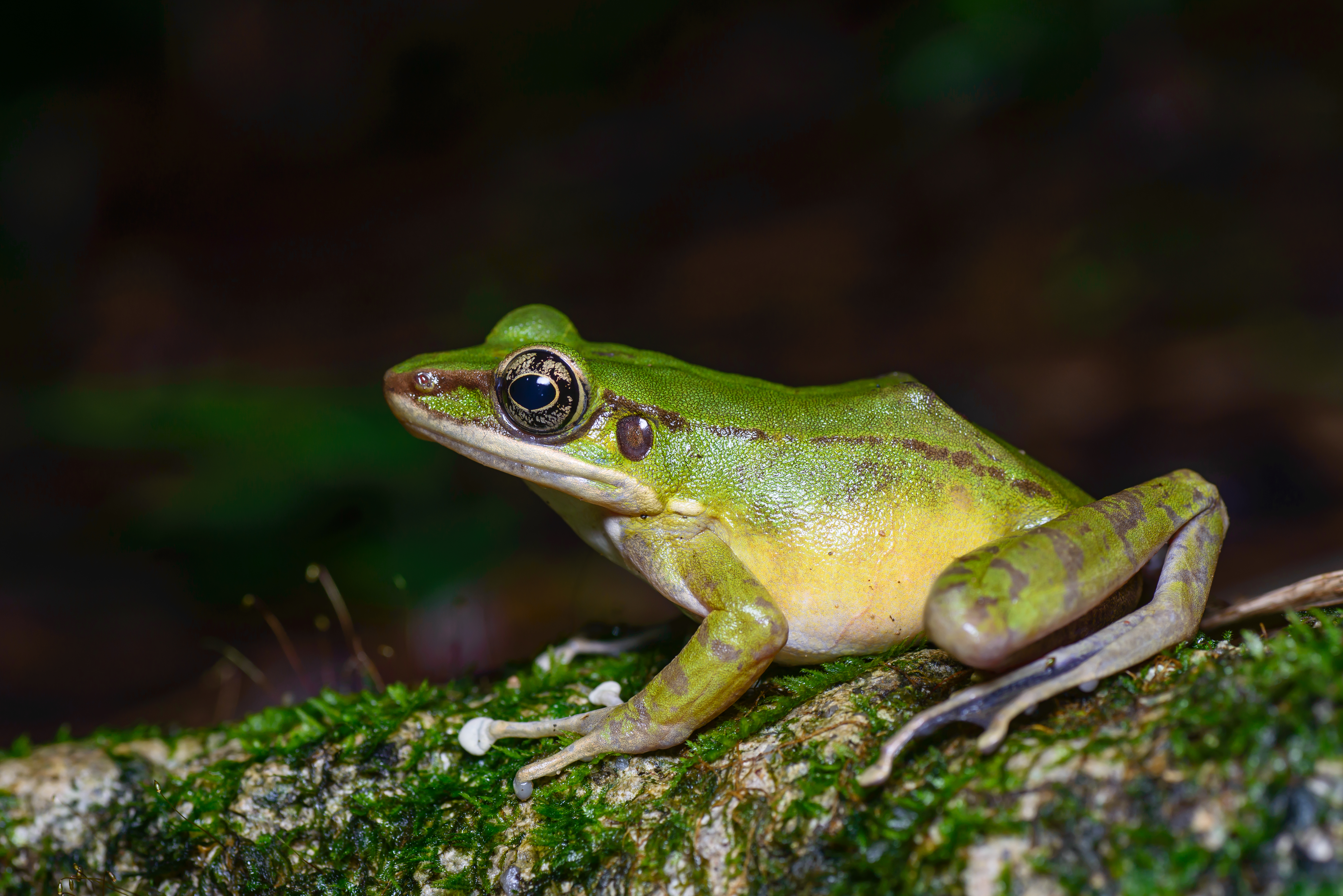
Odorrana hosii Khao Sok National Park
