= Odorrana exiliversabilis =

Conservation status
- Least Concern (IUCN 3.1)

Scientific classification
- Kingdom: Animalia
- Phylum: Chordata
- Class: Amphibia
- Order: Anura
- Family: Ranidae
- Genus: Odorrana
- Species: O. exiliversabilis

Binomial name
- Odorrana exiliversabilis Li, Ye, and Fei, 2001

Synonyms
- Rana exiliversabilis (Li, Ye, and Fei, 2001); Huia exiliversabilis (Li, Ye, and Fei, 2001); Bamburana exiliversabilis (Li, Ye, and Fei, 2001)

Species of amphibian

Odorrana exiliversabilis (Fujian bamboo-leaf frog) is a species of frogs in the family Ranidae that is endemic to southeastern China where it is found in Fujian, western Zhejiang, and southern Anhui provinces. These frogs can be found in mountain forest streams and are common in suitable habitat. The species is not considered threatened by the IUCN.

Molecular genetic analysis of mitochondrial DNA puts Odorrana exiliversabilis in the same clade with Odorrana tormota, Odorrana nasica, Odorrana nasuta, and Odorrana versabilis.

== Description ==
Males measure 43–52 mm (1.7–2.0 in) and females 52–62 mm (2.0–2.4 in) in snout–vent length. Tadpoles are up to 27 mm (1.1 in) in total length.
