= Odorrana mutschmanni =

Scientific classification
- Kingdom: Animalia
- Phylum: Chordata
- Class: Amphibia
- Order: Anura
- Family: Ranidae
- Genus: Odorrana
- Species: O. mutschmanni

Binomial name
- Odorrana mutschmanni Pham, Nguyen, Le, Bonkowski & Ziegler, 2016

Species of amphibian

Odorrana mutschmanni is a true frog species with a wide range in Southeast Asia. It is found from Cao Bằng Province in Vietnam. The findings are published in the journal Zootaxa No. 4084 February 26, 2016. The species name is set to honor Dr. Frank Mutschmann, director of the Institute of Veterinary EXOMED in Berlin (Germany), in recognition of his contributions in His Majesty Research and Conservation of Biodiversity in Vietnam.

== Description ==
Frogs are large in size, females are larger than males. Length of stems in males 85-91mm and 108-110mm in females. Longer head than wide; no pockets outside; round eardrum, large by 0.68–0.70 eye diameter. The top and front of the back are smooth, the back of the sides of the ribs with small particles; Atrophy of the eardrum, without ribs; blue back with black spots; the lower abdomen and large black spots. This species belongs to the Odorrana andersonii group and has sister relationships with the Odorrana wuchuanensis species distributed in China.
