= O. sinica =

O. sinica may refer to:

- Odorrana sinica, a frog species endemic to China
- Orithyia sinica, the tiger crab or tiger face crab, a singularly unusual crab species
