= Cyrtodactylus kohrongensis =

Scientific classification
- Kingdom: Animalia
- Phylum: Chordata
- Class: Reptilia
- Order: Squamata
- Suborder: Gekkota
- Family: Gekkonidae
- Genus: Cyrtodactylus
- Species: C. kohrongensis

Binomial name
- Cyrtodactylus kohrongensis Grismer, Onn, Oaks, Neang, Sokun, Murdoch, Stuart, & Grismer, 2020

Species of lizard

The Koh Rong Island bent-toed gecko (Cyrtodactylus kohrongensis) is a species of gecko endemic to Cambodia.
