= Odorrana supranarina =

Conservation status
- Endangered (IUCN 3.1)

Scientific classification
- Kingdom: Animalia
- Phylum: Chordata
- Class: Amphibia
- Order: Anura
- Family: Ranidae
- Genus: Odorrana
- Species: O. supranarina

Binomial name
- Odorrana supranarina (Matsui, 1994)

Synonyms
- Rana supranarina Matsui, 1994

Species of frog

Odorrana supranarina is a species of frog in the family Ranidae. It is endemic to Ryukyu Archipelago, Japan, and is known from the islands of Ishigaki and Iriomote, both in the Yaeyama Group. The specific name supranarina refers to the large size of this species (Latin supra means "beyond")—at the time of the species description, it was the largest member of the so-called Rana narina complex. Common name greater tip-nosed frog has been coined for it.

== Description ==
Adult males measure 59–77 mm (2.3–3.0 in) and adult females 81–103 mm (3.2–4.1 in) in snout–vent length. The body is stout with triangular head; the snout is pointed. The tympanum is distinct. The fingers are unwebbed and have small discs. The toes have well-developed webbing and discs that are slightly larger than the finger discs. The dorsolateral and supratympanic folds are weakly developed. The dorsum is smooth. Dorsal ground colour varies from light brown to greenish brown; there are no distinct markings. There are dark markings below the canthus, around the tympanum, and along the dorsolateral fold. The limbs have dark crossbars. Males have paired subgular vocal sacs.

Tadpoles are rather slender and have long, muscular tail. A newly metamorphosed individual measures about 13 mm (0.5 in) in snout–vent length.

On both Ishigaki and Iriomote, Odorrana supranarina is sympatric with Odorrana utsunomiyaorum, a "dwarf" species in relative terms. As O. supranarina is a "giant" species, it appears that the body sizes of these two species have diverged, perhaps in response to competition.

== Habitat and conservation ==
Odorrana supranarina inhabits broad-leaved evergreen forests along mountain streams. However, it can also be found in coastal areas, in riverside forests just outside the mangrove. Breeding takes place in October–March in shallow streams and in pools. The eggs are attached to stones or dead leaves under the water.

The species has a small and fragmented range. Habitat loss and degradation caused by logging and human settlement are threats to it, particularly on Ishigaki. Iriomote is a national park, but improved protection of its forest habitats is still needed.
