= Piebald frog =

Piebald frog may refer to:

- Piebald odorous frog (Odorrana schmackeri), a frog in the family Ranidae endemic to China
- Piebald spiny frog (Nanorana maculosa), a frog in the family Dicroglossidae endemic to Yunnan, China
