= Cyrtodactylus monilatus =

Scientific classification
- Kingdom: Animalia
- Phylum: Chordata
- Class: Reptilia
- Order: Squamata
- Suborder: Gekkota
- Family: Gekkonidae
- Genus: Cyrtodactylus
- Species: C. monilatus

Binomial name
- Cyrtodactylus monilatus Yodthong, Rujirawan, Stuart, Grismer, Aksornneam, Termprayoon, Ampai, & Aowphol, 2022

Gecko endemic to Vietnam

Cyrtodactylus monilatus is a species of gecko that is endemic to Thailand.
