= Odorrana hainanensis =

Conservation status
- Vulnerable (IUCN 3.1)

Scientific classification
- Kingdom: Animalia
- Phylum: Chordata
- Class: Amphibia
- Order: Anura
- Family: Ranidae
- Genus: Odorrana
- Species: O. hainanensis

Binomial name
- Odorrana hainanensis Fei, Ye, and Li, 2001

Synonyms
- Rana hainanensis (Fei, Ye, and Li, 2001); Huia hainanensis (Fei, Ye, and Li, 2001)

Species of amphibian

Odorrana hainanensis is a species of frogs in the family Ranidae that might be endemic to Hainan Island, China; there is one record from Guangxi. Prior to its description in 2001, it was confused with Odorrana andersonii.

Odorrana hainanensis is a very rare species inhabiting large to medium streams and the surrounding forests. It is threatened by habitat loss caused by agriculture, logging, and hydropower development.

== Description ==
Males measure 49–62 mm (1.9–2.4 in) and females 75–123 mm (3.0–4.8 in) in snout–vent length.
