= Large frog =

Large frog may refer to:

- Large odorous frog (Odorrana graminea), a frog in the family Ranidae found in southern China from southern Anhui and northern Zhejiang west to extreme southern Gansu, southeastern Sichuan, and southern Yunnan to the border of Vietnam, Laos and Myanmar
- Large pygmy frog (Microhyla berdmorei), a frog in the family Microhylidae found in eastern India, Bangladesh, southernmost China (Yunnan), Mainland Southeast Asia as well as Borneo and Sumatra
- Large swamp frog (Limnonectes magnus), a frog in the family Dicroglossidae endemic to the Philippines
- Large tree frog (Rhacophorus dennysi), a frog in the family Rhacophoridae found in China, Laos, Burma, and Vietnam
- Large wrinkled frog (Nyctibatrachus major), a frog in the family Nyctibatrachidae endemic to Malabar and Wynaad, Kerala, and Tamil Nadu, India

== See also ==
- Large-headed frog (Limnonectes kuhlii), a frog in the family Dicroglossidae found in Java
- Large-mouthed frog (Amietia), a genus of frogs in the family Pyxicephalidae endemic to central and southern Africa
