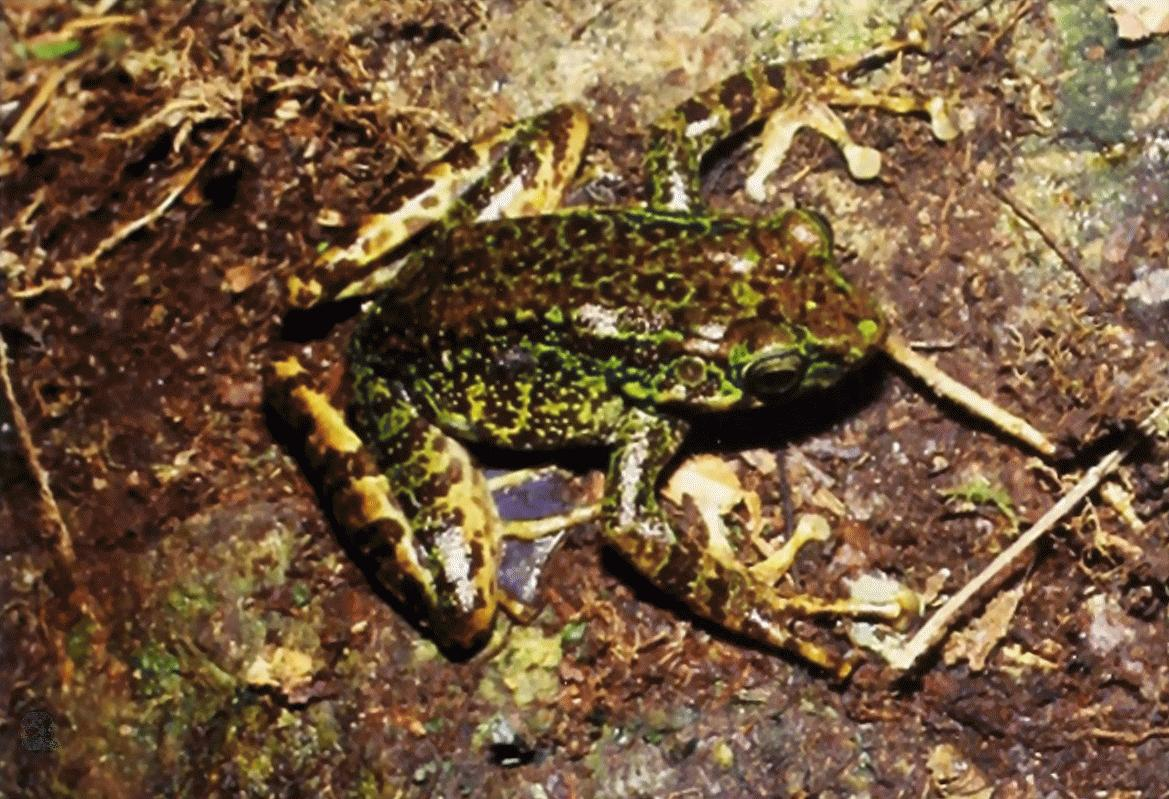

Conservation status
- Vulnerable (IUCN 3.1)

Scientific classification
- Kingdom: Animalia
- Phylum: Chordata
- Class: Amphibia
- Order: Anura
- Family: Ranidae
- Genus: Odorrana
- Species: O. geminata

Binomial name
- Odorrana geminata Bain, Stuart, Nguyen, Che & Rao, 2009

= Odorrana geminata =

Species of frog

Odorrana geminata is a frog in the genus Odorrana. It is found in Vietnam.

== Distribution ==
Odorrana geminata is found in swamps and freshwater wetlands in Vietnam.
