= Odorrana hejiangensis =

Conservation status
- Vulnerable (IUCN 3.1)

Scientific classification
- Kingdom: Animalia
- Phylum: Chordata
- Class: Amphibia
- Order: Anura
- Family: Ranidae
- Genus: Odorrana
- Species: O. hejiangensis

Binomial name
- Odorrana hejiangensis (Deng & Yu, 1992)

Synonyms
- Rana hejiangensis Deng & Yu, 1992

Species of frog

Odorrana hejiangensis (common names: Hejiang frog, Hejiang odorous frog) is a species of frog in the family Ranidae that is endemic to China. It is found in the Yangtze River Valley of southern Chongqing and northern Guizhou, with an isolated record in western Guangxi. Its name refers to the type locality, Hejiang County in northern Sichuan. Its natural habitats are shaded hill streams and the surrounding riparian forests. Its status is insufficiently known.

Male Odorrana hejiangensis grow to a snout–vent length of about 47 mm (1.9 in) and females to 87 mm (3.4 in).
