= Odorrana khalam =

Conservation status
- Least Concern (IUCN 3.1)

Scientific classification
- Kingdom: Animalia
- Phylum: Chordata
- Class: Amphibia
- Order: Anura
- Family: Ranidae
- Genus: Odorrana
- Species: O. khalam

Binomial name
- Odorrana khalam (Stuart, Orlov, and Chan-ard, 2005)

Synonyms
- Rana khalam Stuart, Orlov, and Chan-ard, 2005; Huia khalam (Stuart, Orlov, and Chan-ard, 2005)

Species of frog

Odorrana khalam is a species of frog in the family Ranidae. It is found in the mountains of southern Laos and central Vietnam. It is also likely to be found in northeastern Cambodia.

Odorrana khalam occurs in montane evergreen forests at elevations of 647–2,298 m (2,123–7,539 ft) above sea level, being typically found on rocks and among herbaceous vegetation adjacent to still to slowly-flowing stream sections. It is probably threatened to some extent by habitat loss occurring within its range. It is known to occur in a number of protected areas.
