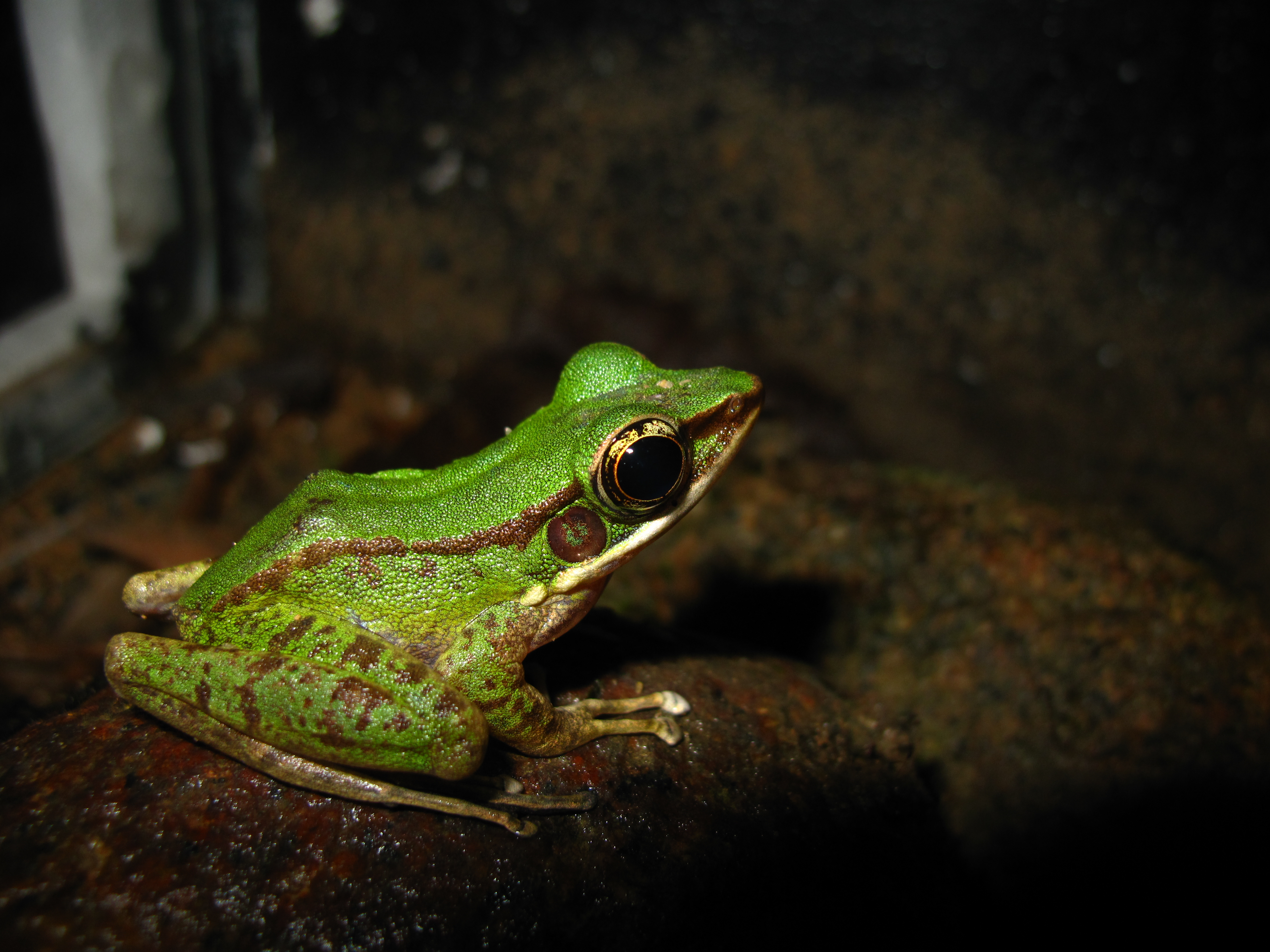
- Hose's Frog (Odorrana hosii)

Scientific classification
- Kingdom: Animalia
- Phylum: Chordata
- Class: Amphibia
- Order: Anura
- Family: Ranidae
- Genus: Odorrana; Fei, Ye & Huang 1990

Type species
- Rana margaretae Liu, 1950

Species
- More than 50, see text

Synonyms
- Eburana Dubois, 1992; Wurana P.P.Li, Y.Y.Lu & S.Q.Lü, 2006

= Odorrana =

Genus of amphibians

Odorrana, commonly known as odorous frogs, is a genus of true frogs (Ranidae) from East Asia and surrounding regions. Many of these frogs inhabit fast-flowing mountain streams, and they typically have a remarkably pointed snout, as evidenced by common names like tip-nosed frog and scientific names like nasica or nasutus ("with a nose").

== Systematics and taxonomy ==
Odorrana has a confusing taxonomic and systematic history. Most species placed in the genus were initially placed in Rana. Some were considered to belong in Amolops and Huia instead, and while others were separated as Eburana. The most extreme taxonomic hypothesis would merge Odorrana with Huia.

In the early 21st century, molecular phylogenetic studies established that the systematic confusion was due to widespread convergent evolution between Amolops, Huia and Odorrana, which actually represent quite distinct lineages of the frog subfamily Raninae. This necessitated some taxonomic changes, especially affecting Huia. Odorrana also appears to be a rather close relative of Rana, and may even be its sister group. While it is not completely certain that Odorrana is in fact a distinct genus, the available evidence points towards this being so.

Initial studies have revealed what seems to be several clades of Odorrana, which are sometimes considered subgenera. However, molecular data is available for relatively few species, and convergent evolution is liable to obscure relationships if assessed by morphology alone.

- A number of very species, including O. bacboensis, O. chapaensis, Ishikawa's Frog (O. ishikawae) and perhaps others do not seem to be particularly close to any of the larger groups or each other.
- A very robustly-supported clade containing the type species O. margaretae as well as at least O. andersonii, O. daorum O. grahami and O. hmongorum.
- A minor but quite distinct lineage containing O. absita, O. khalam and perhaps others. Namely O. hejiangensis and O. schmackeri might belong here, or represent another minor and distinct lineage.
- A large group, quite likely a clade, containing the Amami Tip-nosed Frog (O. amamiensis), O. banaorum, O. chloronota, Hose's Frog (O. hosii), O. livida, O. morafkai, O. megatympanum, the Ryukyu Tip-nosed Frog (O. narina), O. supranarina, O. swinhoana, O. tiannanensis, O. utsunomiyaorum and probably others. The specialized lineage encompassing the Long-snout Torrent Frog (O. nasica), the Concave-eared Torrent Frog (O. tormota), O. versabilis, and maybe some more species also belongs here.

=== Species ===
- Odorrana absita
- Odorrana amamiensis – Amami tip-nosed frog
- Odorrana andersonii
- Odorrana anlungensis
- Odorrana aureola
- Odorrana bacboensis
- Odorrana banaorum
- Odorrana bolavensis
- Odorrana cangyuanensis
- Odorrana chapaensis
- Odorrana chloronota
- Odorrana concelata
- Odorrana confusa
- Odorrana damingshanensis
- Odorrana dulongensis Liu, He, Wang, Beukema, Hou, Li, Che & Yuan, 2021
- Odorrana exiliversabilis
- Odorrana fengkaiensis
- Odorrana geminata
- Odorrana gigatympana
- Odorrana grahami
- Odorrana graminea
- Odorrana hainanensis
- Odorrana heatwolei
- Odorrana hejiangensis
- Odorrana hosii – Hose's frog
- Odorrana huanggangensis
- Odorrana ichangensis
- Odorrana indeprensa (Bain & Stuart, 2005)
- Odorrana ishikawae – Ishikawa's frog
- Odorrana jingdongensis
- Odorrana junlianensis
- Odorrana khalam
- Odorrana kuangwuensis
- Odorrana kweichowensis
- Odorrana leishanensis
- Odorrana leporipes
- Odorrana liboensis
- Odorrana lipuensis
- Odorrana livida
- Odorrana lungshengensis
- Odorrana macrotympana
- Odorrana margaretae
- Odorrana mawphlangensis
- Odorrana monjerai
- Odorrana morafkai
- Odorrana mutschmanni Pham, Nguyen, Le, Bonkowski, and Ziegler, 2016
- Odorrana nagao Pham CT, Hoang CV, Nguyen MHT, Nguyen TQ, Ngo HN, Le DT, Ziegler, 2026
- Odorrana nanjiangensis Fei, Ye, Xie & Jiang, 2007
- Odorrana narina – Ryukyu tip-nosed frog
- Odorrana nasica – Long-snout torrent frog (formerly in Amolops)
- Odorrana nasuta
- Odorrana orba
- Odorrana rotodora
- Odorrana sangzhiensis
- Odorrana schmackeri
- Odorrana sinica
- Odorrana splendida
- Odorrana supranarina
- Odorrana swinhoana
- Odorrana tianmuii
- Odorrana tiannanensis
- Odorrana tormota – Concave-eared torrent frog
- Odorrana trankieni
- Odorrana utsunomiyaorum
- Odorrana versabilis
- Odorrana wuchuanensis
- Odorrana yentuensis
- Odorrana yizhangensis
- Odorrana zhaoi
