= Odorrana nagao =

Scientific classification
- Kingdom: Animalia
- Phylum: Chordata
- Class: Amphibia
- Order: Anura
- Family: Ranidae
- Genus: Odorrana
- Species: O. nagao

Binomial name
- Odorrana nagao Pham CT, Hoang CV, Nguyen MHT, Nguyen TQ, Ngo HN, Le DT, Ziegler, 2026

Species of frog

Odorrana nagao, also known as the Nagao odorous frog or Ếch đá na-gao in Vietnamese, is a species of frog that belongs to the family Ranidae. It can be found in northern Vietnam. They are a nocturnal species being found on rocks located inside caves or near their entrances. It is a medium-sized species with males being smaller than females at around 37.4 mm while females range from 47.1 to 54.7 mm in length.

This species was named after the Nagao Natural Environment Foundation located in Japan. This was done to honor their support of biodiversity research and nature conservation in Vietnam.

== Phylogeny ==
This species is a sister taxon to a currently unresolved clade that consists of O. calciphila, O. concelata, O. feii, O. liboensis and O. lipuensis.
