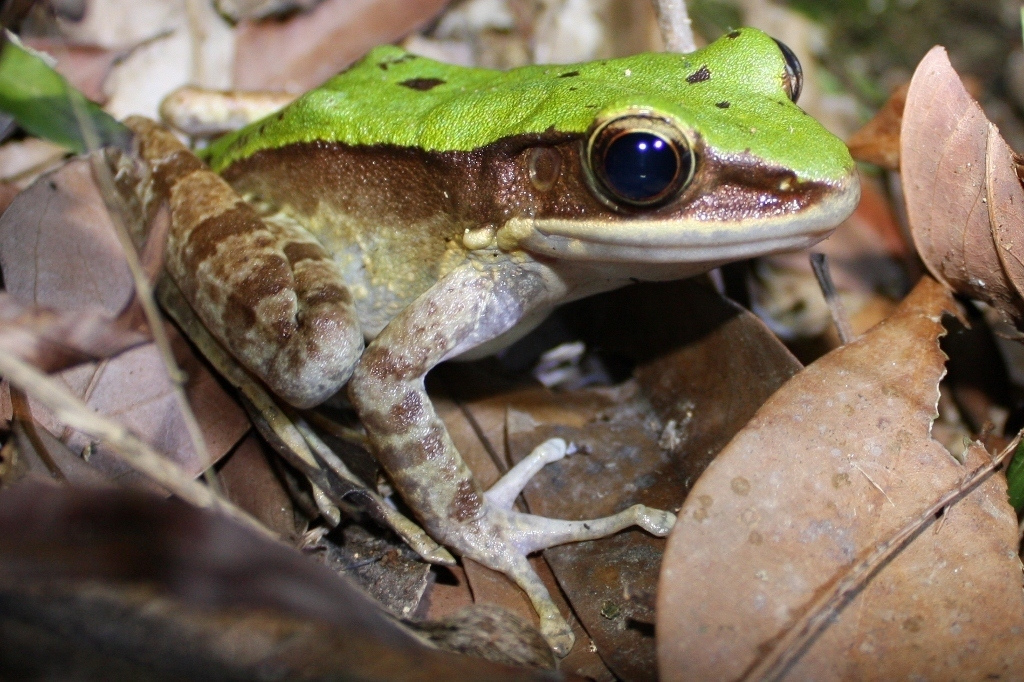

Conservation status
- Least Concern (IUCN 3.1)

Scientific classification
- Kingdom: Animalia
- Phylum: Chordata
- Class: Amphibia
- Order: Anura
- Family: Ranidae
- Genus: Odorrana
- Species: O. graminea

Binomial name
- Odorrana graminea (Boulenger, 1900)

Synonyms
- Rana graminea Boulenger, 1900

= Odorrana graminea =

Species of amphibian

Odorrana graminea, the large odorous frog, inhabits fast-flowing streams in elevated mountainous regions of Southern China and Northern Indochina. It is one of 56 species in the genus Odorrana. Male O. graminea are noted for their ultrasonic call characteristics and are one of three frog species able to detect ultrasonic frequencies (>20 kHz), likely evolved to facilitate communication amidst noisy streams and waterfalls. Studies on O. graminea courtship vocalizations suggest female preference for increased proportion of nonlinear vocal phenomena (NLP).

== Description ==
Odorrana graminea have a dorsoventrally compressed body with large eyes. Dorsum is green with smooth skin; flanks are brown with yellow marbling and with slight granulations. They are relatively large frogs, particularly the females: females grow to a snout–vent length of 78–100 mm (3.1–3.9 in), whereas males attain a more modest length of 42–53 mm (1.7–2.1 in). Apart from size, males differ from females by their smaller digital disks, stronger forearms, larger tympanum, velvety nuptial pads on thumb, and paired gular pouches below jaw articulations.

Odorrana graminea can produce ultrasonic calls. This is very rare among non-mammalian vertebrates, but has been shown for the related concave-eared torrent frog Odorrana tormota. However, O. graminea does not have recessed ears, a feature believed to be important for ultrasonic hearing in O. tormota. Exactly how O. graminea detects ultrasound remains yet to be determined.

== Habitat and distribution ==
Odorrana graminea is found in southern China (from southern Anhui and northern Zhejiang west to extreme southern Gansu, southeastern Sichuan, and southern Yunnan to the border of Vietnam, Laos and Myanmar, although it has not yet been recorded in the latter two countries. Its type locality is the Wuzhi Mountain in Hainan. Until the revision of "Rana livida" in 2003, this frog was considered a synonym of Odorrana livida. The species occurs near fast-flowing rivers and streams in montane (sub-)tropical forests.

== Taxonomy ==
Odorrana graminea is one of 56 species in the genus Odorrana. All Odorrana frogs live in tropical and subtropical mountainous regions in East and South Asia. The genus is rapidly growing, with over twenty new species documented since 2005.

== Conservation ==
The conservation status of Odorrana graminea is Least concern according to the International Union for Conservation of Nature. Species in genus Odorrana ranges from "Least Concern" (e.g., Odorrana schmackeri) to "Endangered" (e.g., Odorrana splendida) - with many other species also documenting data deficiency.

=== Habitat loss ===
Rampant deforestation has led to habitat loss and subsequent population decrease for many amphibians. Residential and commercial development, agriculture, aquaculture, and biological resource use (e.g. logging and wood harvesting) are documented ecosystem stressors for Odoranna graminea.

Research on closely related species Odorrana morafkai in the Viatnamese Langbian plateau suggests a decrease in population density in highly-disturbed sites. In both moderately-disturbed and non-disturbed sites, no such population density decrease was observed. There was no elucidated relationship between diet composition and habitat disturbance. Prey availability did not differ significantly in sites exhibiting various levels of habitat disturbance, suggesting that factors besides prey availability contribute to the gradient in population density.

=== Conservation efforts ===
There has been no population monitoring or conservation effort specific to Odorranna graminea. Conservation efforts are in progress for certain endangered Odorrana species in order to preserve genetic diversity in a rapidly diminishing gene pool. A 2011 study on the highly-endangered Odorrana ishikawae presented a method of strategic artificial insemination of a parent generation, then natural mating in subsequent generations. Researchers struggled with yield, with less than 50% of inseminated eggs surviving to metamorphosis. However, it presents a promising strategy of manual intervention that could boost local diversity in other species of endangered Odorrana.

== Diet ==
Information on the O. graminea diet is lacking. However, studies of the related Odorraa morafkai in Southern Vietnam suggest a diverse diet of both aquatic and terrestrial prey. 90% of O. morafkai prey consists of insects, especially beetles. Distribution of prey type varied with season, likely due to increased range of access during the rainy versus dry season.

== Vocalizations ==
Odorrana graminea has a large repertoire of calls. They are highly variable both between and within individuals. Odorrana graminea has six basic types of calls with variation within each category: a. short tonal call (dominant type), b. long tonal call, c. multi-note calls, d. tonal calls with shallow or no frequency modulation, e. narrow-band call, and f. staccato call. All except for narrow-band and staccato contain ultrasonic frequencies (20 kHz or higher). Narrow-band and staccato calls are specifically used for short-range communication.

=== Ultrasonic characteristics ===
Male Odorrana graminea exhibit a wide variety of ultrasonic harmonics (>20 kHz), and is one of few non-mammalian vertebrate species able to detect this frequency range. Huia cavitympanum, Odorrana graminea, and O. graminea's close relative Odorrana tormota are the only known frog species able to detect ultrasonic waves. A thin tympanic membrane shared by O. tormota and O. graminea may be involved in this feat. Interestingly, ultrasonic communication is limited to males, while females are unable to detect at this range.

O. graminea's ability for ultrasonic communication may have evolved due to their natural proximity to noisy streams and waterfalls (a habitat niche shared by all three ultrasonic frog species). Both biotic and abiotic sounds tend to have a frequency far below ultrasonic range, so O. graminea is able to differentiate between intra-species communication and background noise in order to effectively locate other males of their species.

=== Auditory sexual differences ===
Total and high-sensitivity hearing ranges vary greatly between O. graminea males and females. Males have a total range of 11–24 kHz, and a sensitive frequency range of 3–15 kHz. Females have a total range of 3–16 kHz, and a sensitive frequency range of 1–8 kHz (below the ultrasonic threshold of 20 kHz).

=== Nonlinear vocal components ===
O. graminea males are known to exhibit nonlinear vocal phenomena "NLP". NLPs are exhibited in many animal species, and are characterized by harsh and chaotic voice features intended to attract attention or convey arousal. O. graminea can produce four types of NLP components: subharmonics, deterministic chaos, frequency jumps, or biphonations. Most vocalizations contain one or more of these components. Studies suggest that females prefer males with a higher proportion of nonlinear vocal components (P-NLP-C). Additionally, body size is positively correlated with P-NLP-C and amplectant mating behavior. It is possible that females use P-NLP-C as a long-distance indicator of fitness in potential mates.

=== Phonotaxis ===
Female O. graminea vocalize as an indication of readiness to mate. In an experimental setup, female calls were played over a loudspeaker in the presence of O. graminea males. This prompted the male to orient his body and jump towards the loudspeaker with an impressive acuity of less than 1° (very precise compared to other amphibian species, which generally exhibit 16-23° acuity).

== Anti-microbial defense ==
Genus Odorrana exhibits notably abundant levels of anti-microbial peptides (AMPs) compared to other amphibians. Antimicrobial defense is considered a necessary tool to enable general amphibian colonization of damp or aquatic habitats, which tend to be pathogen-rich. AMPs function as a crucial innate immunity defense against pathogenic microbes. They are generally 10-50 residues long and vary in both sequence and structure for species across genus Odorrana. AMPs function by damaging the membranes of target organisms such as bacteria, fungi, parasites, and viruses. Different AMPs target unique ranges of microbes. Growing concern regarding increased antibiotic resistance has prompted further interest into the use of AMPs in medicinal applications.

Research conducted on 22 AMPs derived from relative Odorrana tiannanensis demonstrated low potency against bacteria that are relevant to human health. Researchers hypothesize that either 1) these bacteria are not harmful to the frog, and friendly colonization helps to defend the frog against harmful environmental pathogens, or 2) these bacteria are eliminated by an immune system other than AMP.

Four Odorrana tiannanensis AMPs were tested for antioxidant properties against free radicals, which can arise due to factors such as oxidative stress of UV exposure. Three of the four exhibited significant radical scavenging activity. Level of radical scavenging activity was correlated with the number of cysteine residues and disulfide bridges present in the AMP.

Unlike certain other amphibians, the Odorrana tiannanensis AMPs under study did not demonstrate any cytotoxic or tumor cell anti-proliferative properties.

== Gut microbiome ==
Gut microbiota is affected by a large set of factors such as diet, habitat, health, and age. Temperature has been observed to induce direct changes in microbiome diversity and composition in terrestrial amphibians. Habitat proximity agriculture is known to impact expression levels of bacterial genes associated with pesticide degradation. In this way, the microbiome was observed to adapt in a way that increased frog health and survival.

A 2022 study investigating gut microbiome determinants compared the compositions of O. graminea and closely related Odorrana tormota and Amolops wuyiensi . All three species are sympatric in Eastern China and tend to exist on rocks nearby running water. Researchers found significantly differing microbiota in all three species in terms of relative abundance of gut microbiota and predicted gene function. In all three species of this study, the present phyla include (in decreasing abundance): Proteobacteria, Bacteroidetes, Verrucomicrobia, and Firmicute. Proteobacteria is hypothesized to facilitate stress tolerance to cold streams. Relative abundance of various microbiota depends on habitat - but does not severely impact core microbiome functionality.

== Physiology ==
=== Size sexual dimorphism ===
As in 90% of frog species, female Odorrana graminea are significantly larger than males). Studies suggest that female frogs are under greater size-based selectional pressure due to an associated increase in fecundity. In certain frog species, larger males enjoy greater reproductive success due to victory in combat against smaller males; however, other traits such as forearm thickness and vocalization energy expenditure can be greater indicators of reproductive success in other species.

=== Ear structure ===
Odorrana graminea males have a non-recessed tympanic membrane. This is contrary to previous theories that recessed tympana specifically enable perception of high-frequency sounds (recessed tympanic membranes are exhibited in both other species of ultrasonic-communicating frogs: Odorrana tormota, Huia cavitympanum). Similarly to O. tormota, the tympanic membrane of O. graminea is relatively thin and transparent compared to other frog species, which could partially explain the ultrasonic hearing ability of both species.

=== Growth defects and ocular abnormalities ===
Growth defects and malformations are an increasing phenomenon for amphibians worldwide, particularly in high-polluted areas (oil and gas sites, agricultural land with pesticide use or livestock). Odorrana graminea have also been observed with various limb malformations, for example stunted forelegs attributed to physical disruptions during the larval stage. Adult O. graminea have also been observed with cataracts, a clouding of the lens of the eye. This is rarely observed in adult frogs, as vision is essential for the individual's ability to find prey and avoid predation.
