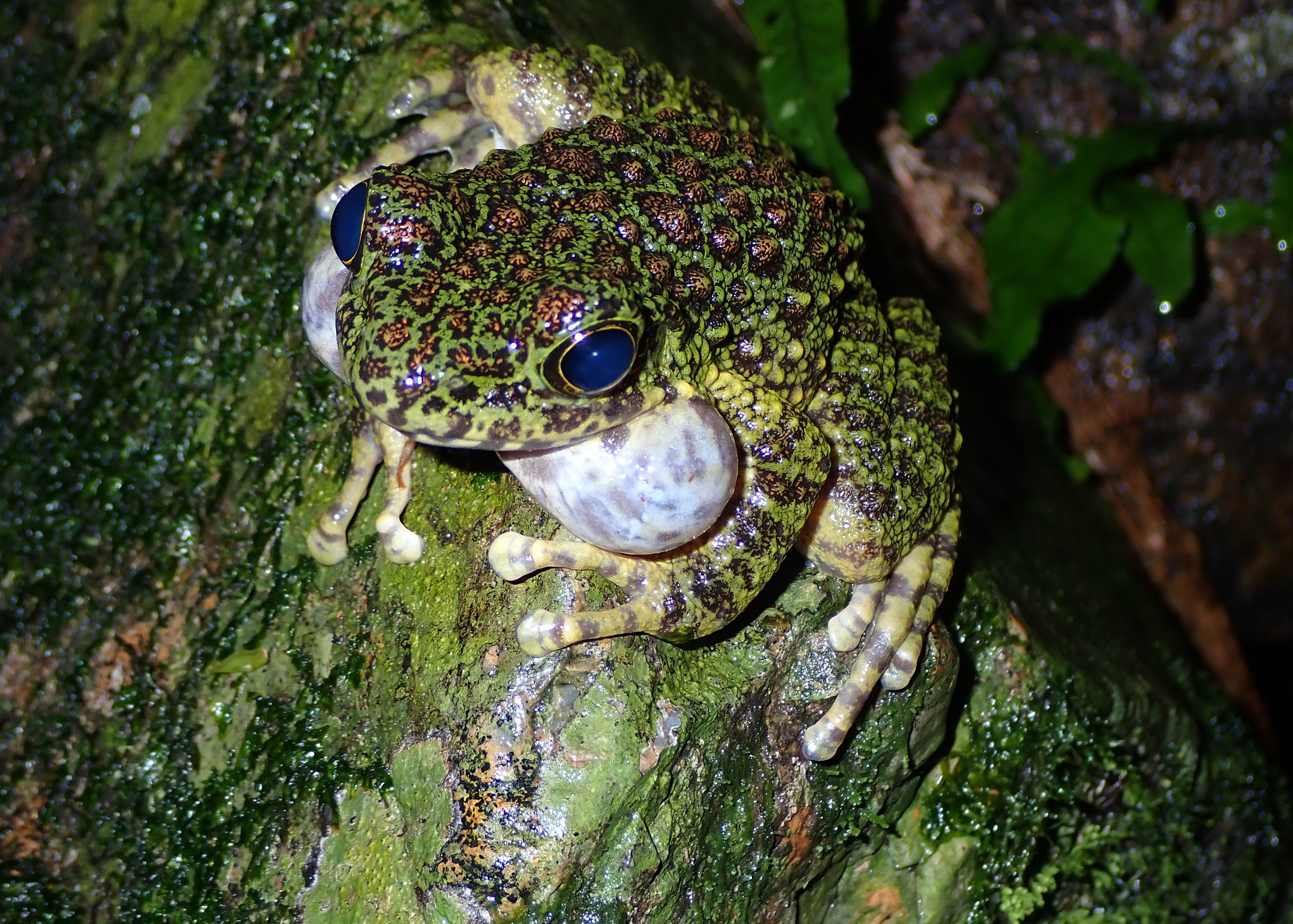

Conservation status
- Endangered (IUCN 3.1)

Scientific classification
- Kingdom: Animalia
- Phylum: Chordata
- Class: Amphibia
- Order: Anura
- Family: Ranidae
- Genus: Odorrana
- Species: O. splendida

Binomial name
- Odorrana splendida Kuramoto, Satou, Oumi, Kurabayashi, and Sumida, 2011

= Odorrana splendida =

Species of amphibian

Odorrana splendida (Amami Ishikawa's frog or Amami Oshima frog) is a species of frog in the family Ranidae. It is endemic to Amami Island, the second largest island of the Ryukyu Islands of Japan. It is closely related to Odorrana ishikawae (the Okinawa Ishikawa's frog, formerly known as the Ishikawa's frog) and was considered the same species until 2011.

This species inhabits the upstream regions surrounded by broad-leaved evergreen forests. Observations in the western part of the island, indicate that the breeding season is from late January to May, with the peak in February to March. During the breeding season, males come to specific breeding streams and stay in the surrounding area. The larvae undergo metamorphosis in the summer of the following year or two years later.

It is threatened by habitat loss caused by logging, the construction of roads and alteration of rivers. The small Indian mongoose, introduced in 1979, was eradicated in 2024, eliminating the threat posed by mongooses.
