= Odorrana monjerai =

Conservation status
- Data Deficient (IUCN 3.1)

Scientific classification
- Kingdom: Animalia
- Phylum: Chordata
- Class: Amphibia
- Order: Anura
- Family: Ranidae
- Genus: Odorrana
- Species: O. monjerai

Binomial name
- Odorrana monjerai (Matsui & Jaafar, 2006)

Species of amphibian

Odorrana monjerai is a medium-sized frog of the genus Odorrana.

== Description & habitat ==
O. monjerai has only been found in the Teroi River on Gunung Jerai, Kedah State, West Malaysia. It is distinguished from all other members of the subgenus by the combination of: white lip stripe, dorsolateral fold, full web on the fourth toe, vomerine teeth, gular vocal pouch and relatively large tympanum in males, no dorsal marking, no clear light spots on rear of thigh, first finger subequal to second, finely tuberculated dorsum, and unpigmented ova.
