= Amolops mengyangensis =

Conservation status
- Data Deficient (IUCN 3.1)

Scientific classification
- Kingdom: Animalia
- Phylum: Chordata
- Class: Amphibia
- Order: Anura
- Family: Ranidae
- Genus: Amolops
- Species: A. mengyangensis

Binomial name
- Amolops mengyangensis Wu and Tian, 1995
- Amolops mengyangensis is known with certainty only known from southern Yunnan, China

Species of frog

Amolops mengyangensis is a species of frog in the family Ranidae. It is known with certainty only from its type locality, the eponymous Mengyang in Xishuangbanna Dai Autonomous Prefecture, southern Yunnan province of China. However, if Amolops daorum is its junior synonym, distribution of Amolops mengyangensis would be considerably wider, including the vicinity of Sa Pa in northern Vietnam near the Chinese border, Hong Kong, and Houaphanh Province in eastern Laos, and presumably also including the intervening areas.

== Taxonomy ==
Amolops mengyangensis was described in 1995 based on two males and one female collected in 1957 from Yunnan. The specimens had previously been reported as Amolops chunganensis, and this view was maintained by some later authors. Rana daorum was described in 1995 based on specimens from northern Vietnam. In 2007, Ohler concluded that Rana daorum is a junior synonym of Amolops mengyangensis, but this conclusion was challenged by Stuart, Biju, and others who considered it valid as Amolops daorum. As of late 2018, the Amphibian Species of the World and AmphibiaWeb databases recognize both Amolops mengyangensis and Amolops daorum as valid species.

== Description ==
Males measure 39–40 mm (1.5–1.6 in) in snout–vent length, whereas females can reach 60 mm (2.4 in) in snout–vent length. The snout is long and blunt. The tympanum is distinct and large. The hind limbs are long. The finger and the toe tips bear discs. The toes are partially webbed. Skin is smooth. Preserved specimens are dorsally grayish-blueish and ventrally white.

== Habitat and conservation ==
Amolops mengyangensis is listed as of least concern in the IUCN Red List of Threatened Species, but this assumes that Amolops daorum is part of this species and has a relatively broad distribution. Circumscribed this way, Amolops mengyangensis lives in tropical forest in and near streams at elevations of 680–1,900 m (2,230–6,230 ft) above sea level. The type series of Amolops mengyangensis (sensu stricto) was collected from an elevation of 680 meters.
