= Odorrana margaretae =

Conservation status
- Least Concern (IUCN 3.1)

Scientific classification
- Kingdom: Animalia
- Phylum: Chordata
- Class: Amphibia
- Order: Anura
- Family: Ranidae
- Genus: Odorrana
- Species: O. margaretae

Binomial name
- Odorrana margaretae (Liu, 1950)

Synonyms
- Huia margaretae (Liu, 1950); Rana margaretae Liu, 1950

Species of frog

Odorrana margaretae (common names: Margareta's frog, Margaret frog, green odorous frog) is a species of frog in the family Ranidae. It is found in southern and central China (Gansu, Guangxi, Sichuan, Hubei, Hunan, Guizhou, and southern Shaanxi provinces) and northern Vietnam (Lao Cai and Lai Chau provinces).

Odorrana margaretae inhabit fast-flowing hill streams and creeks surrounded by lush vegetation (both forest and fields). It is not considered threatened by the International Union for Conservation of Nature (IUCN).
