= Odorrana mawphlangensis =

Conservation status
- Data Deficient (IUCN 3.1)

Scientific classification
- Kingdom: Animalia
- Phylum: Chordata
- Class: Amphibia
- Order: Anura
- Family: Ranidae
- Genus: Odorrana
- Species: O. mawphlangensis

Binomial name
- Odorrana mawphlangensis Pillai and Chanda, 1977

Synonyms
- Rana mawphlangensis Pillai and Chanda, 1977; Limnonectes mawphlangensis Pillai and Chanda, 1977

Species of frog

Odorrana mawphlangensis is a species of frog in the family Ranidae. It is endemic to northeastern India, although its range might extend into Bhutan and Nepal. The type locality is Mawphlang sacred forest in the Khasi Hills. Common names Mawphlang wart frog, Mawphlang frog, Mawphlang odorous frog, and hill stream frog have been coined for it.

== Description ==
Odorrana mawphlangensis are large frogs that grow to 90–106 mm (3.5–4.2 in) in snout–vent length. The body is elongated and dorsoventrally compressed. The head is as wide as it is long. The eyes are relatively large and have elliptically horizontal pupils. The tympanum is distinct. The limbs are long. The fingers are long and bear small discs. The toes are long, almost fully webbed, and bearing distinct discs. The dorsum has glandular warts and dorsolater glandular folds that run from behind the eye to the groin. Colouration is dorsally green to bronze-brown with brown circular spots. The lip has yellow to bronze-brown stripes. The lower jaw and the flanks have golden marbling or spotting. The ventrum is whitish.

== Habitat and conservation ==
Odorrana mawphlangensis is a semi-aquatic frog occurring near streams in tropical moist forests at elevations below 1,100 m (3,600 ft) above sea level, or in sub-tropical moist forests at elevations of 1,500–1,800 m (4,900–5,900 ft), depending on the source. The threats to this poorly-known species are unknown.
