= Odorrana absita =

Conservation status
- Least Concern (IUCN 3.1)

Scientific classification
- Kingdom: Animalia
- Phylum: Chordata
- Class: Amphibia
- Order: Anura
- Family: Ranidae
- Genus: Odorrana
- Species: O. absita

Binomial name
- Odorrana absita (Stuart and Chan-ard, 2005)

Synonyms
- Huia absita Stuart and Chan-ard, 2005

Species of frog

Odorrana absita is a species of frog in the family Ranidae. It is found in southern Laos and central Vietnam. It was originally described in genus Huia. Its type locality is Xe Sap National Biodiversity Conservation Area in southern Laos.

== Description ==
Adult males in the type series measure 34–41 mm (1.3–1.6 in) and adult females 51–68 mm (2.0–2.7 in) in snout–vent length (based on respectively 2 and 3 specimens). The overall appearance is moderately slender. The head is narrow and the snout is projecting and obtusely pointed; Rounded in lateral view. The tympanum is distinct. The finger and toe tips are expanded to discs; the toes are almost fully webbed. Coloration is dorsally beige with light green flecking; there is pinkish wash on upper sides, forelimbs, and lips. Black spotting is present on the dorsal surface of snout tip, lips, upper eyelids, forelimbs, dorsolateral folds, and flanks. Black streaks run below edge of canthus from tip of snout to eye, obliquely from eye to commissure of jaws, and from eye along supratympanic fold to posterior rim of tympanum, continuing obliquely to shoulder. The limbs have brown crossbars. The venter and undersides of limbs are creamy-yellow. The iris is coppery and has a dark red blotch anterior and posterior to the pupil. Males have a subgular vocal sac.

== Habitat and conservation ==
This species is known from hilly evergreen and mixed forests at elevations of 653–1,300 m (2,142–4,265 ft) above sea level. It is associated with swiftly flowing, clear rocky streams, but specimens have also been recorded away from water. They are typically found above the ground in forest vegetation. Breeding probably involves free-living tadpoles developing in streams.

Odorrana absita occurs in a number of protected areas. Outside very well protected areas, it is probably suffering from habitat loss and degradation caused by conversion of forest to agricultural land to grow cash crop plantations such as rubber, coffee, and tea. It is also harvested locally for food.
