= Oreolalax sterlingae =

Conservation status
- Endangered (IUCN 3.1)

Scientific classification
- Kingdom: Animalia
- Phylum: Chordata
- Class: Amphibia
- Order: Anura
- Family: Megophryidae
- Genus: Oreolalax
- Species: O. sterlingae

Binomial name
- Oreolalax sterlingae Nguyen, Phung, Le, Ziegler & Böhme, 2013

Species of amphibian

Oreolalax sterlingae is a species of amphibian in the family Megophryidae. It is endemic to Lao Cai Province, Vietnam. It is known only from a single stream on Mount Fansipan, in Hoang Lien National Park, Lao Cai Province, Vietnam.
