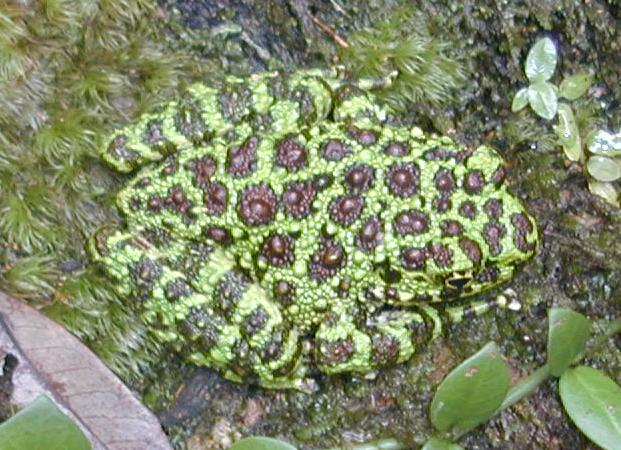
- Ishikawa's frog

Conservation status
- Endangered (IUCN 3.1)

Scientific classification
- Kingdom: Animalia
- Phylum: Chordata
- Class: Amphibia
- Order: Anura
- Family: Ranidae
- Genus: Odorrana
- Species: O. ishikawae

Binomial name
- Odorrana ishikawae (Stejneger, 1901)

Synonyms
- Buergeria ishikawae Stejneger, 1901; Rana ishikawae (Stejneger, 1901); Huia ishikawae (Stejneger, 1901)

= Ishikawa's frog =

Species of amphibian

Ishikawa's frog (Odorrana ishikawae) is a species of frog in the family Ranidae. It is endemic to Okinawa Island, one of the Ryukyu Islands of Japan. It has been described as the most beautiful frog in Japan.

Its natural habitats are temperate forests, rivers, and intermittent rivers. It is threatened by habitat loss.
