= Odorrana indeprensa =

Conservation status
- Vulnerable (IUCN 3.1)

Scientific classification
- Kingdom: Animalia
- Phylum: Chordata
- Class: Amphibia
- Order: Anura
- Family: Ranidae
- Genus: Odorrana
- Species: O. indeprensa

Binomial name
- Odorrana indeprensa (Bain and Stuart, 2006)

Species of amphibian

Odorrana indeprensa is a true frog species in the family Ranidae, described first by Bain and Stuart 2006.

The species is endemic to Thailand and known from Khao Yai National Park only.
