= Odorrana bolavensis =

Conservation status
- Endangered (IUCN 3.1)

Scientific classification
- Kingdom: Animalia
- Phylum: Chordata
- Class: Amphibia
- Order: Anura
- Family: Ranidae
- Genus: Odorrana
- Species: O. bolavensis

Binomial name
- Odorrana bolavensis (Stuart and Bain, 2005)

Synonyms
- Rana bolavensis Stuart and Bain, 2005

Species of frog

Odorrana bolavensis is a species of frog in the family Ranidae. It is endemic to the Bolaven Plateau, Laos. Its natural habitats are wet evergreen forest. It can be found at night on rocks and vegetation along rocky streams, occasionally on leaf-litter or tree branches away from streams.
