= Odorrana banaorum =

Conservation status
- Least Concern (IUCN 3.1)

Scientific classification
- Kingdom: Animalia
- Phylum: Chordata
- Class: Amphibia
- Order: Anura
- Family: Ranidae
- Genus: Odorrana
- Species: O. banaorum

Binomial name
- Odorrana banaorum (Bain, Lathrop, Murphy, Orlov & Cuc, 2003)

Synonyms
- Rana banaorum Bain et al., 2003

Species of frog

Odorrana banaorum is a species of frog in the family Ranidae that is known from Vietnam and Cambodia.

Its natural habitats are subtropical or tropical moist lowland forests and rivers. Its status is insufficiently known.
