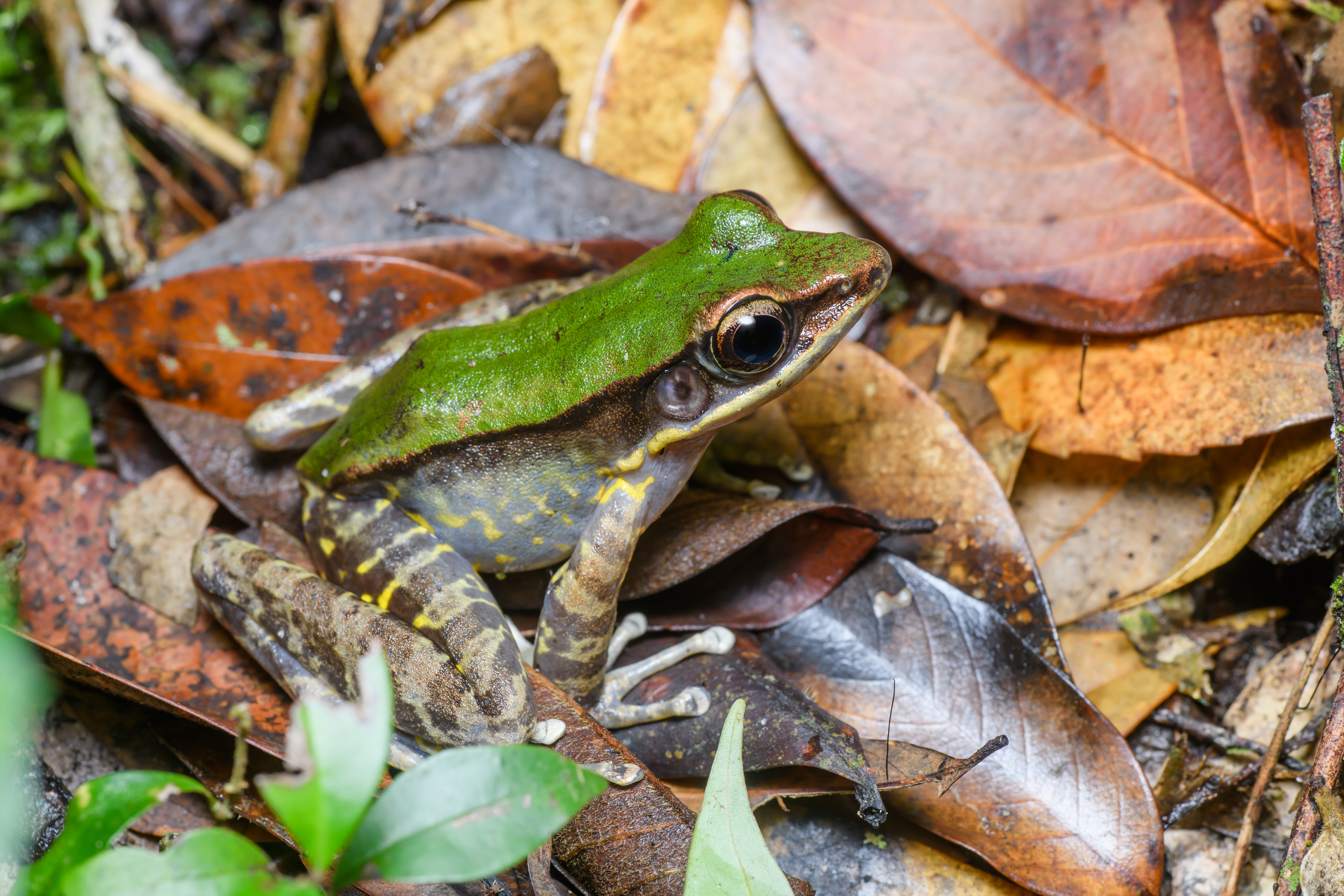
- Odorrana aureola (green morph) – Phu Kradueng National Park

Conservation status
- Least Concern (IUCN 3.1)

Scientific classification
- Kingdom: Animalia
- Phylum: Chordata
- Class: Amphibia
- Order: Anura
- Family: Ranidae
- Genus: Odorrana
- Species: O. aureola

Binomial name
- Odorrana aureola Stuart, Chuaynkern, Chan-ard, and Inger, 2006

= Odorrana aureola =

Species of amphibian

Odorrana aureola, also known as the Phu Luang cliff frog or gold-flanked odorous frog (Thai: กบชะง่อนผาภูหลวง), is a true frog species from northeastern Thailand. The specific name aureola is Latin and means ornamented with gold, in reference to the characteristic yellow markings on the limbs and flanks of this frog. It is notable for its ability to change color between green and brown, according to the surroundings.

== Description ==
Adult males measure 64–67 mm (2.5–2.6 in) and adult females 87–97 mm (3.4–3.8 in) in snout–vent length. The overall appearance is moderately slender. The head is longer than it is wide. The snout is obtusely pointed in dorsal view and round in profile. The tympanum is visible. The finger and toe tips are expanded into discs. The toes are fully webbed. The dorsum is green to coppery-brown, sometimes with markings. Dark brown band runs from the side of head to the dorsal half of flank. The posterior surface of forearm, ventral half of flank, anterior and posterior surface of thigh, posterior surface of shank, and dorsal surface of foot are black with distinct, vermiform, bright yellow markings. The upper lip stripe is yellow while the lower lip is black. The belly is white. Males have often white spinules.

== Habitat and conservation ==
The species was originally found in Phu Luang Wildlife Sanctuary, Loei Province, and was later confirmed in the neighboring Phu Kradueng National Park as well. It occurs in hilly evergreen forests at elevations of 1,100–1,500 m (3,600–4,900 ft) above sea level, Specimens can be found on boulders, rock outcrops, and fallen trees near swift, rocky streams and cascades, or occasionally, slow streams.

This species is currently known from protected areas, but its true distribution is probably somewhat wider. It can be locally abundant, but it probably cannot adapt to anthropogenic habitats.

== Photos ==
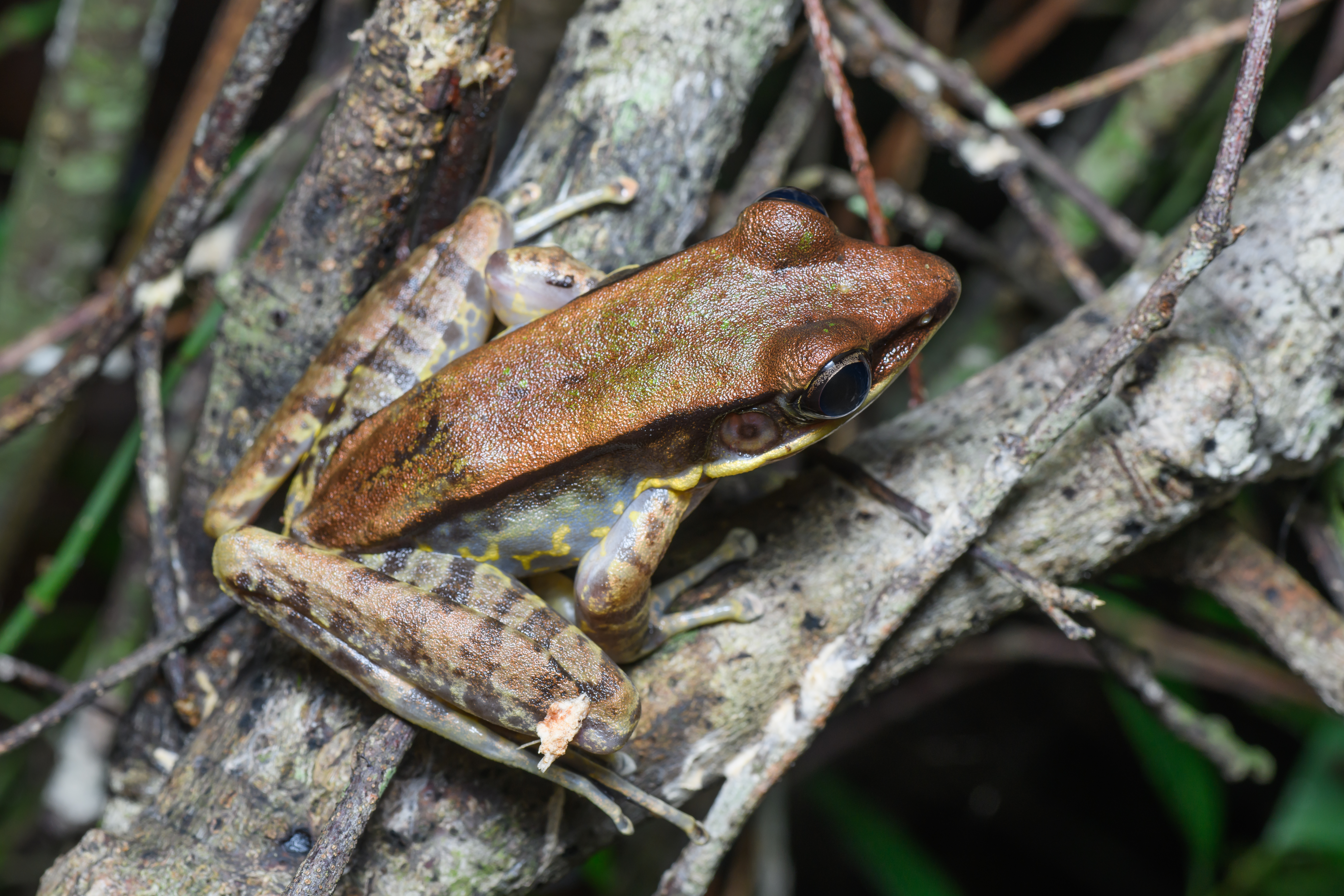
Odorrana aureola (brown morph) - Phu Kradueng National Park
