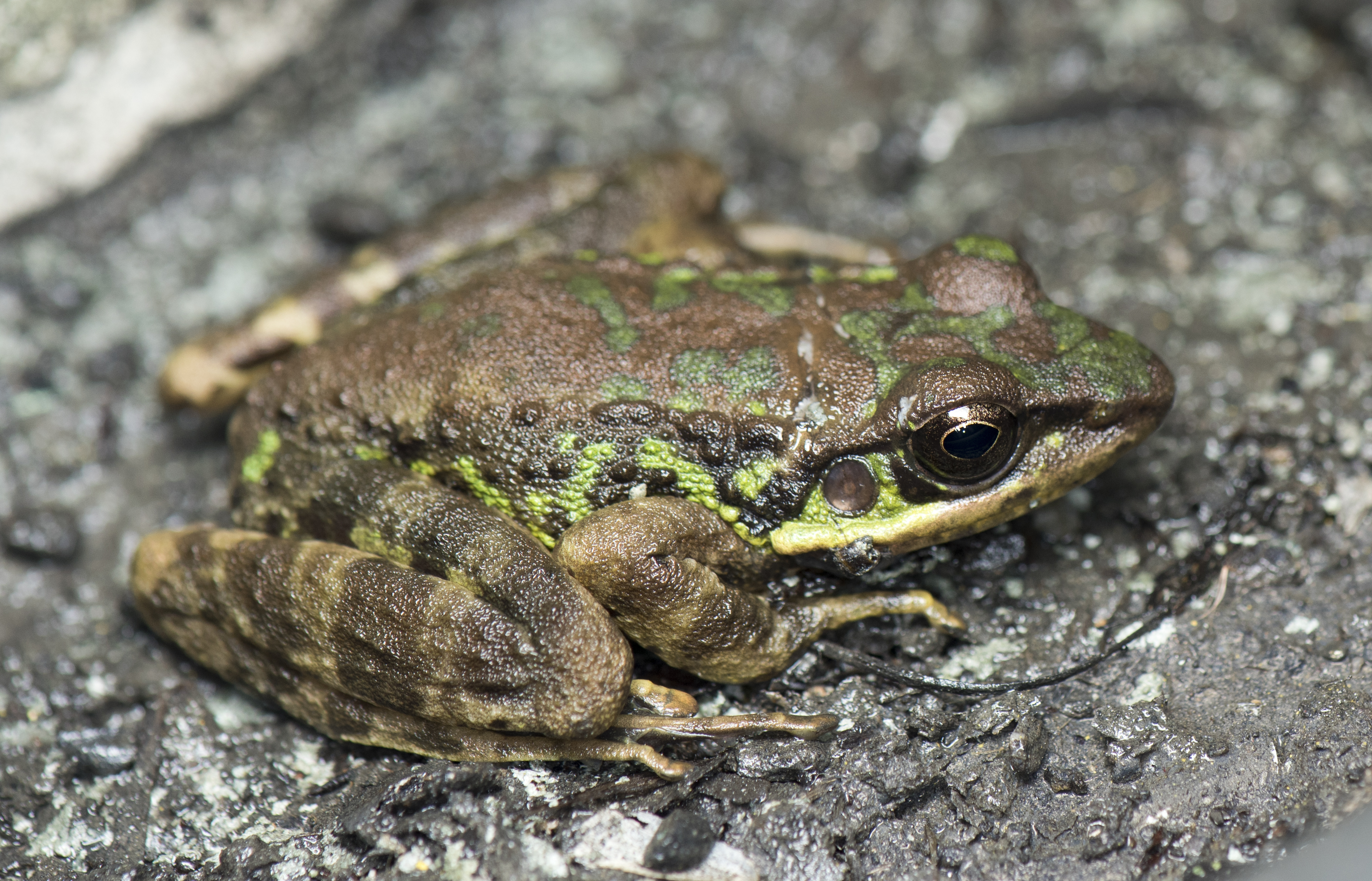

Conservation status
- Least Concern (IUCN 3.1)

Scientific classification
- Kingdom: Animalia
- Phylum: Chordata
- Class: Amphibia
- Order: Anura
- Family: Ranidae
- Genus: Odorrana
- Species: O. swinhoana

Binomial name
- Odorrana swinhoana (Boulenger, 1903)

Synonyms
- Rana swinhoana Boulenger, 1903; Rana kosempensis Werner, 1914 "1913"; Rana taiwaniana Otsu, 1973; Amolops taiwanianus (Otsu, 1973)

= Odorrana swinhoana =

Species of frog

Odorrana swinhoana is a species of frog in the family Ranidae. It is endemic to Taiwan and widely distributed in hilly areas below 2,000 m (6,600 ft). It is named for Robert Swinhoe, a British naturalist and diplomat. Its common names include Swinhoe's brown frog, Bangkimtsing frog, brown-backed odorous frog, Taiwan odorous frog, and Taiwan sucker frog.

== Description ==
Odorrana swinhoana are medium to large-sized frogs, reaching a maximum snout-vent length of 12 cm (4.7 in). They can live up to 11 years. Sizes vary by location; males from a low-lying location measured on average 58 and 73 mm (2.3 and 2.9 in) in snout–vent length, respectively, and from a highland location 73 and 85 mm (2.9 and 3.3 in), respectively. The dorsum is bright green and the flanks are brown or green, broken up by white or dark mottling. The dorsal skin is finely pebbled. The venter is white. The finger tips bear well developed discs. The toes have well-developed webbing.

The tadpoles are adapted to running water and have a ventral sucking disc. The back is green.

== Habitat and conservation ==
Odorrana swinhoana occur in hill streams in broadleaf forests. They forage on both terrestrial and aquatic prey, primarily on insects and arachnids, but also gastropods, crustaceans, and chilopods. Breeding takes place in small mountainous, shady, rocky creeks. Males call day and night, usually hidden in crevices among the rocks. The eggs are attached to rocks under the water.

It is a common species that is not facing serious threats, although agriculture and infrastructure development represent some threats. It is present in a number of protected areas.
