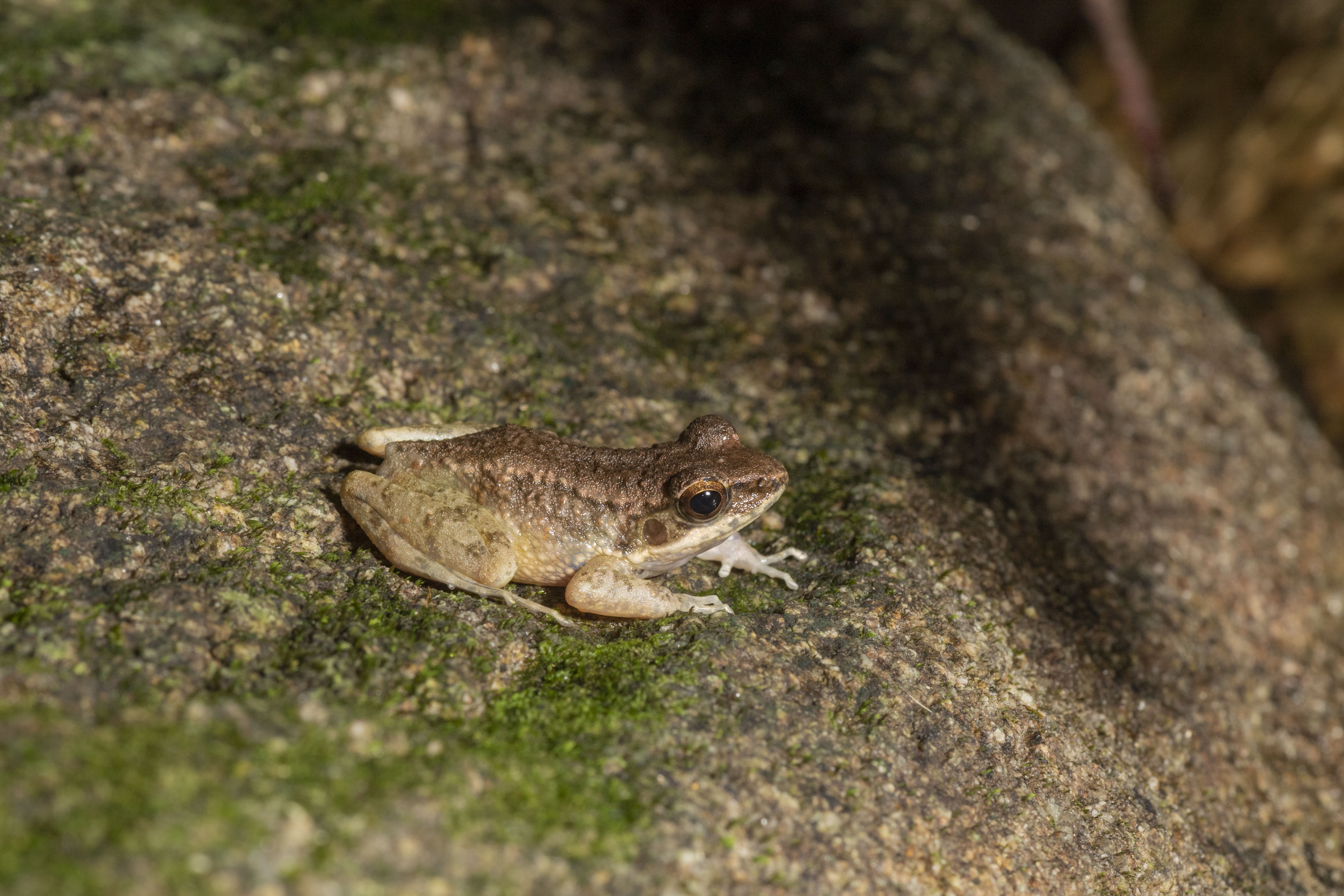

Conservation status
- Endangered (IUCN 3.1)

Scientific classification
- Kingdom: Animalia
- Phylum: Chordata
- Class: Amphibia
- Order: Anura
- Family: Ranidae
- Genus: Odorrana
- Species: O. utsunomiyaorum

Binomial name
- Odorrana utsunomiyaorum (Matsui, 1994)

Synonyms
- Rana utsunomiyaorum Matsui, 1994

= Odorrana utsunomiyaorum =

Species of frog

Odorrana utsunomiyaorum is a species of frog in the family Ranidae. It is endemic to Ryukyu Archipelago, Japan, and is known from the islands of Ishigaki and Iriomote, both in the Yaeyama Group. The specific name utsunomiyaorum honours Taeko and Yasuaki Utsunomiya for their contributions to clarifying the amphibian fauna of the Yaeyama Group.

== Description ==
Adult males measure 39–48 mm (1.5–1.9 in) and adult females 46–59 mm (1.8–2.3 in) in snout–vent length. The body is moderately stout with triangular head. The snout is obtusely pointed in dorsal view but rounded in profile. The tympanum is distinct. The fingers are unwebbed and have small discs. The toes have well-developed webbing and discs that are slightly smaller than the discs of the outer fingers. The dorsolateral fold is weakly developed and supratympanic fold is absent. The dorsum is scattered with numerous tubercles. Dorsal ground colour varies from light brown to greenish brown. The back has some dark blotches. There are dark markings below the canthus, around the tympanum, and along the dorsolateral fold. The limbs have dark, incomplete crossbars. Males have paired subgular vocal sacs.

On both Ishigaki and Iriomote, Odorrana utsunomiyaorum is sympatric with Odorrana supranarina, a "giant" species in relative terms. As O. utsunomiyaorum is a "dwarf" species, it appears that the body sizes of these two species have undergone divergent evolution, perhaps in response to competition.

== Habitat and conservation ==
Odorrana utsunomiyaorum inhabits broad-leaved evergreen forests along mountain streams. Where Odorrana supranarina is present, this species tends to occupy smaller streams. Breeding takes place in late February–April in shallow streams. The eggs are attached to stones under the water.

The species has a small and fragmented range. Habitat loss and degradation caused by deforestation is a major threat. Iriomote is a national park, but improved protection of its forest habitats is still needed. It also suffers from competition with the introduced cane toads (Rhinella marina).
