= Odorrana orba =

Conservation status
- Least Concern (IUCN 3.1)

Scientific classification
- Kingdom: Animalia
- Phylum: Chordata
- Class: Amphibia
- Order: Anura
- Family: Ranidae
- Genus: Odorrana
- Species: O. orba

Binomial name
- Odorrana orba (Stuart and Bain, 2005))

Synonyms
- Rana orba Stuart and Bain, 2005

Species of frog

Odorrana orba is a species of frog in the family Ranidae. It is found in southeastern Laos and central Vietnam. The specific name orba is Latin for "orphan", referring to the fact that this species was—at the time of species description—known in Vietnam only from a single juvenile.

== Description ==
Adult males measure 37–43 mm (1.5–1.7 in) in snout–vent length, whereas adult females measure 77–94 mm (3.0–3.7 in). The overall appearance is moderately slender. The head is longer than it is wide. The snout is obtusely pointed in dorsal view and rounded laterally. The tympanum is distinct and relatively larger in males than in females. The finger and toe tips have discs. The toes are almost fully webbed. Preserved specimens are dorsally gray-blue with brown reticulation and ventrally cream with diffuse gray markings.

== Habitat and conservation ==
Odorrana orba occurs in evergreen forests near rocky streams at elevations of 200–700 m (660–2,300 ft) above sea level. It is typically observed on leaf litter, vegetation, and rocky surfaces. Presumably, the tadpoles develop in streams, as in other Odorrana where reproductive ecology is known.

Habitat of this species is threatened by rapidly expanding agriculture, converting forests to agricultural land for cash crop plantations (e.g., rubber, coffee, and tea). It occurs in the Nakai–Nam Theun National Biodiversity Conservation Area in Laos, and probably in some other protected areas that overlap with its predicted range.
