= Odorrana trankieni =

Conservation status
- Near Threatened (IUCN 3.1)

Scientific classification
- Kingdom: Animalia
- Phylum: Chordata
- Class: Amphibia
- Order: Anura
- Family: Ranidae
- Genus: Odorrana
- Species: O. trankieni

Binomial name
- Odorrana trankieni (Orlov, Le, and Ho, 2003)

Synonyms
- Rana trankieni Orlov, Le, and Ho, 2003; Huia trankieni (Orlov, Le, and Ho, 2003); Bamburana trankieni (Orlov, Le, and Ho, 2003)

Species of amphibian

Odorrana trankieni, also known as Trankien frog or Tran Kien's odorous frog, is a species of frogs in the family Ranidae. It is endemic to northern Vietnam. Its natural habitats are montane evergreen forests and secondary mixed evergreen bamboo forests at elevations of 300–700 m (980–2,300 ft) above sea level.
