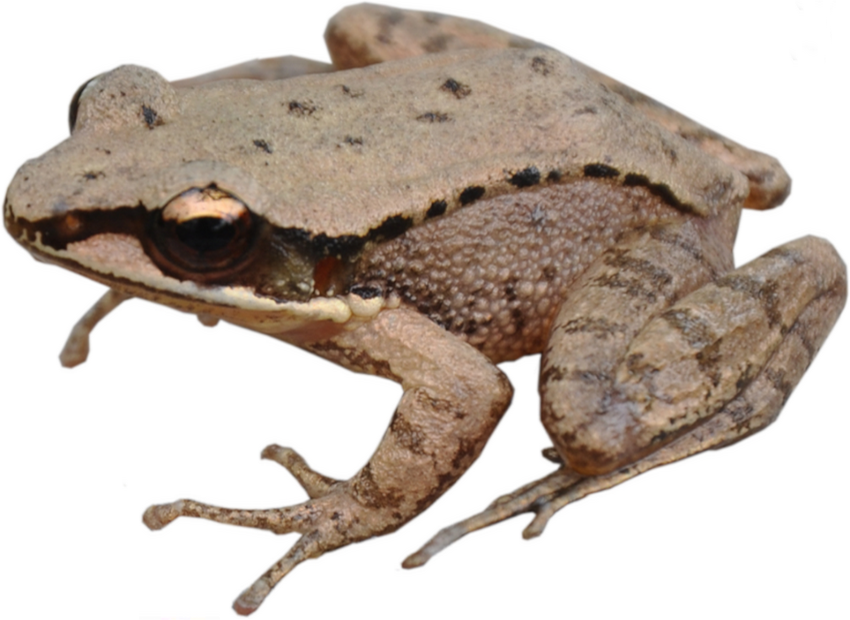

Conservation status
- Least Concern (IUCN 3.1)

Scientific classification
- Kingdom: Animalia
- Phylum: Chordata
- Class: Amphibia
- Order: Anura
- Family: Ranidae
- Genus: Odorrana
- Species: O. tormota

Binomial name
- Odorrana tormota (Wu, 1977)

Synonyms
- Amolops tormotus (Wu, 1977); Rana tormotus Wu, 1977; Wurana tormota (Wu, 1977)

= Concave-eared torrent frog =

Species of amphibian

Odorrana tormota, also known as the concave-eared torrent frog, is a species of frog native to China. Its distribution is restricted to Huangshan Mountains in Anhui and Jiande and Anji counties in northern Zhejiang. It occurs in fast-flowing streams and the surrounding habitats, and breeds in streams. The informally assigned common name for frogs in this genus (and for frogs in certain other genera) is torrent frog.

== Taxonomy ==
This species was formerly placed in the genus Amolops and later on separated in a monotypic genus Wurana. It was eventually recognized to belong in the genus Odorrana where it is perhaps closely related to O. versabilis and the long-snout torrent frog (O. nasica) which also was for long placed in Amolops. The informally assigned common name for frogs in this genus (and for frogs in certain other genera) is torrent frog

== Ultrasonic communication ==
Concave-eared torrent frog is the first frog (and the first non-mammalian vertebrate) demonstrated to both produce and perceive ultrasonic frequencies. These frogs' preferred habitat is adjacent to rapidly moving water which produces perpetual low-frequency background noise. Thus, the use of high-frequency calls is believed to facilitate intraspecific communication within the frogs' noisy environment.

Concave-eared torrent frogs have extremely thin eardrums recessed in their ears, which allows for the ear bones that connect the drum to sound processing part of the ear to be shorter and lighter. Most frogs have thick eardrums close to the surface of the skin and can only hear frequencies below 12 kilohertz. Concave-eared torrent frogs have been recorded chirping at 128 kHz.

=== Blinking communication ===
To overcome the noise of streams, female concave-eared torrent frogs use eyeblinks to communicate with males to initiate mating. This is the only case of the use of blinking outside humans and some primates.

== See also ==
- Hole-in-the-head frog (Huia cavitympanum)
