= Tonkin frog =

Conservation status
- Least Concern (IUCN 3.1)

Scientific classification
- Kingdom: Animalia
- Phylum: Chordata
- Class: Amphibia
- Order: Anura
- Family: Ranidae
- Genus: Odorrana
- Species: O. bacboensis

Binomial name
- Odorrana bacboensis (Bain, Lathrop, Murphy, Orlov, and Ho, 2003)

Synonyms
- Rana bacboensis Bain et al., 2003; Huia bacboensis (Bain et al., 2003)

Species of amphibian

The Tonkin frog (Odorrana bacboensis) is a species of frogs in the family Ranidae. It is found in northern Vietnam and in adjacent southern China (Yunnan and Guangxi provinces). The specific name is derived from Bac Bo, the Vietnamese name for northern Vietnam, as the species was first described from there.

== Description ==
Male Tonkin frogs measure 36–55 mm (1.4–2.2 in) (based on just two specimens) and females 78–105 mm (3.1–4.1 in) in snout–vent length. Skin on the dorsum is shagreened with heavy granulations. The dorsum, flanks, and loreal region are brown with small black spots that get larger on the flanks. The upper and lower lips are creamy yellow with vertical black bars. The venter is creamy white, sometimes with light spotting. The iris is golden, and the margin of pupil has a striking yellow and red border.

== Reproduction ==
This species probably breeds in the autumn. The male has gular pouches, but the call is unknown. Unusually, the eggs are black, indicating that they are laid in places where they are exposed to sunlight to promote development.

== Habitat ==
Natural habitats are forested montane river systems.
