= Odorrana chapaensis =

Conservation status
- Least Concern (IUCN 3.1)

Scientific classification
- Kingdom: Animalia
- Phylum: Chordata
- Class: Amphibia
- Order: Anura
- Family: Ranidae
- Genus: Odorrana
- Species: O. chapaensis

Binomial name
- Odorrana chapaensis (Bourret, 1937)

Synonyms
- Rhacophorus buergeri chapaensis Bourret, 1937; Amalops chapaensis (Bourret, 1937); Amalops macrorhynchus (Yang, 1987); Huia chapaensis (Bourret, 1937)

Species of frog

Odorrana chapaensis (Vietnam sucker frog or Chapa torrent frog) is a species of frog in the family Ranidae that is found in southern Yunnan in China and in northern Vietnam. It is likely that it also occurs in nearby areas of Laos.

Odorrana chapaensis lives in or near swift-flowing streams at altitudes of 800–1,700 m (2,600–5,600 ft). In parts of its range it is threatened by habitat loss.
