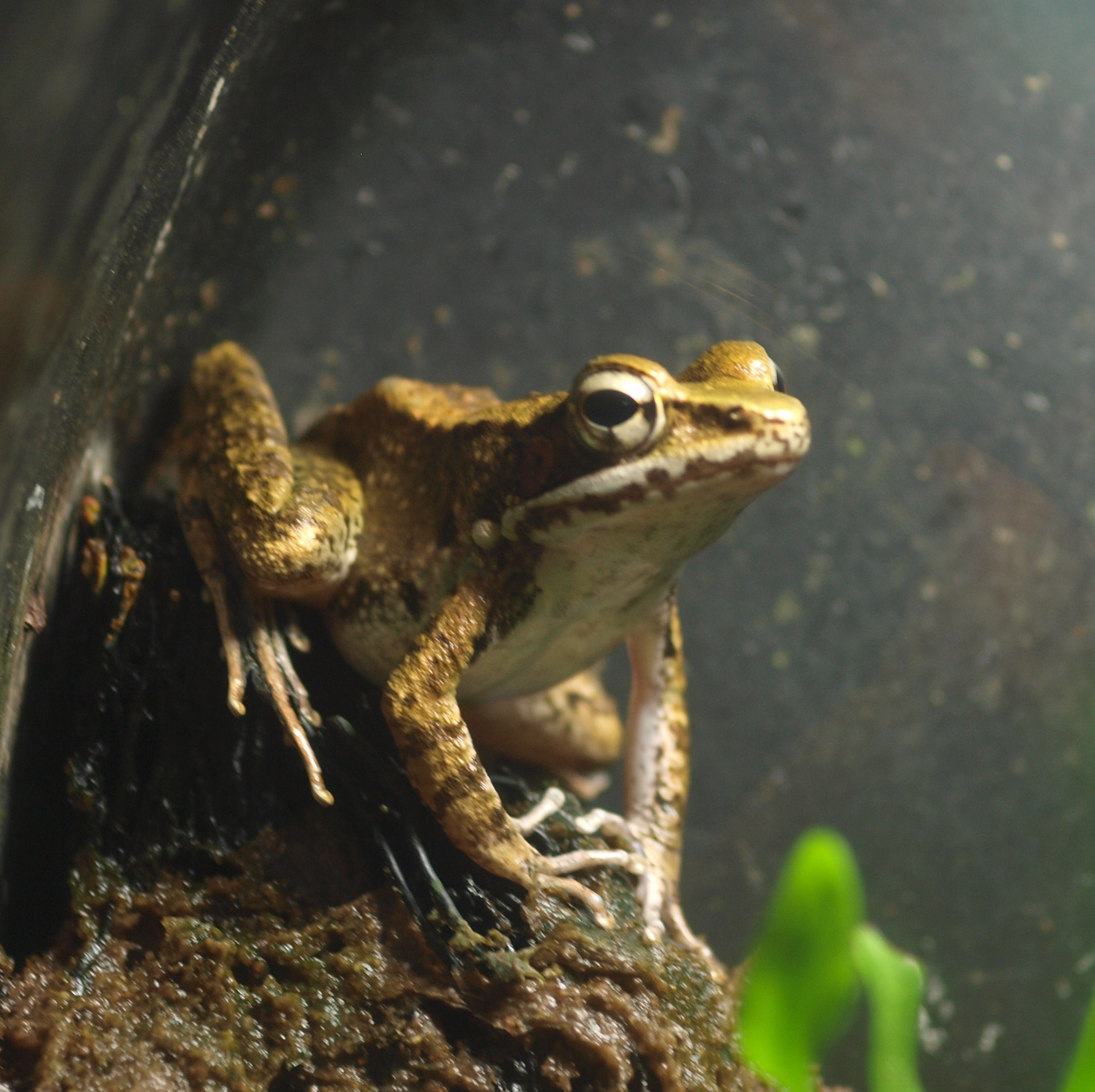

Conservation status
- Endangered (IUCN 3.1)

Scientific classification
- Kingdom: Animalia
- Phylum: Chordata
- Class: Amphibia
- Order: Anura
- Family: Ranidae
- Genus: Odorrana
- Species: O. narina

Binomial name
- Odorrana narina (Stejneger, 1901)

Synonyms
- Rana narina Stejneger, 1901; Buergeria ijimae Stejneger, 1901

= Ryukyu tip-nosed frog =

Species of amphibian

The Ryukyu tip-nosed frog, Ryukyu Island frog, or Okinawa tip-nosed frog (Odorrana narina) is a species of frog in the family Ranidae. It is endemic to Okinawa Island, in the Ryukyu Islands of Japan.

It occurs in streams in primary or well-recovered secondary broad-leaved evergreen forest at elevations up to 503 m (1,650 ft). It is threatened by habitat loss and by predation from introduced small Indian mongooses (Herpestes auropunctatus).
