= Odorrana morafkai =

Conservation status
- Least Concern (IUCN 3.1)

Scientific classification
- Kingdom: Animalia
- Phylum: Chordata
- Class: Amphibia
- Order: Anura
- Family: Ranidae
- Genus: Odorrana
- Species: O. morafkai

Binomial name
- Odorrana morafkai (Bain, Lathrop, Murphy, Orlov, and Ho, 2003)

Synonyms
- Rana morafkai Bain et al., 2003; Huia morafkai (Bain et al., 2003)

Species of amphibian

Odorrana morafkai is a species of frogs in the family Ranidae. It is found in eastern Cambodia, southern Laos, and central Vietnam. This frog is highly unusual because it turns from its daytime green color to brown at night.

== Etymology ==
The specific name morafkai honors David Joseph Morafka, an American herpetologist. Accordingly, common names Morafka's frog and Morafkai frog has been proposed for this species.

== Description ==
Adult males measure 39–46 mm (1.5–1.8 in) and adult females 80–100 mm (3.1–3.9 in) in snout–vent length. The body is dorso-ventrally compressed. The head is broad. The eye is large and prominent. The tympanum is round, relatively large, and distinct; the supratympanic fold is weak. The digits bear large discs, and the toes are fully webbed in females and almost so in males. The dorsal coloration is usually bright green in daylight, but turns brown at night, sometimes with black spots. The flanks are yellow and grey, and the ventrum is creamy white. The limbs have black transverse bars. The upper lip has yellow-white stripe that reaches a glandule above the arm insertion. The iris is golden.

== Habitat and conservation ==
Odorrana morafkai is known over an altitudinal range of 160 to 1,627 m (525 to 5,338 ft) above sea level, from lowland forests to montane cloud forests dominated by evergreen or bamboo and evergreen vegetation. It is typically observed near streams on rocks, leaf litter, herbaceous vegetation, or trees as high as 4 m above the ground. The tadpoles likely develop in streams, as in other Odorrana.

Although not considered threatened, this species is likely to be suffering from habitat loss. It may also be impacted by harvesting for food, with the preferential harvest of large females. It is present in several protected areas, although the aforementioned threats apply also to some protected areas.
