= Bryan Lynn Stuart =

American herpetologist

Bryan L. Stuart
- Education: University of Illinois
- Scientific career
- Fields: Herpetology
- Workplaces: North Carolina Museum of Natural Sciences

Bryan Lynn Stuart, often written as Bryan L. Stuart, is an American herpetologist. He is specialized in the herpetofauna of Southeast Asia, especially in patterns and processes of speciation in morphologically cryptic species complexes. A total of 66 taxon are first described by Stuart.

Stuart earned his MSc at the North Carolina State University and earned his PhD from the University of Illinois and works at the North Carolina Museum of Natural Sciences, University of California where he also fulfilled his postdoc.

== Taxa described ==
- Amolops akhaorum Stuart, Bain, Phimmachak & Spence, 2010
- Amolops compotrix (Bain, Stuart & Orlov, 2006)
- Amolops cucae (Bain, Stuart & Orlov, 2006)
- Amolops daorum (Bain, Lathrop, Murphy, Orlov & Ho, 2003)
- Amolops iriodes (Bain & Nguyen, 2004)
- Amolops vitreus (Bain, Stuart & Orlov, 2006)
- Fejervarya triora Stuart, Chuaynkern, Chan-ard & Inger, 2006
- Hylarana eschatia (Inger, Stuart & Iskandar, 2009)
- Hylarana megalonesa (Inger, Stuart & Iskandar, 2009)
- Hylarana parvaccola (Inger, Stuart & Iskandar, 2009)
- Hylarana rufipes (Inger, Stuart & Iskandar, 2009)
- Laotriton laoensis (Stuart & Papenfuss, 2002)
- Leptobrachium mouhoti Stuart, Sok & Neang, 2006
- Leptolalax aereus Rowley, Stuart, Richards, Phimmachak & Sivongxay, 2010
- Leptolalax melicus Rowley, Stuart, Thy & Emmett, 2010
- Litoria robinsonae Oliver, Stuart-Fox & Richards, 2008
- Odorrana absita (Stuart & Chan-ard, 2005)
- Odorrana aureola Stuart, Chuaynkern, Chan-ard & Inger, 2006
- Odorrana bolavensis (Stuart & Bain, 2005)
- Odorrana geminata Bain, Stuart, Nguyen, Che & Rao, 2009
- Odorrana indeprensa (Bain & Stuart, 2006)
- Odorrana khalam (Stuart, Orlov & Chan-ard, 2005)
- Odorrana melasma (Stuart & Chan-ard, 2005)
- Odorrana orba (Stuart & Bain, 2005)
- Ophryophryne synoria Stuart, Sok & Neang, 2006
- Opisthotropis maculosa Stuart & Chuaynkern, 2007
- Philautus petilus Stuart & Heatwole, 2004
- Rhacophorus vampyrus Rowley, Le, Thi, Stuart & Hoang, 2010
- Tylototriton notialis Stuart, Phimmachak, Sivongxay & Robichad, 2010
- Trimeresurus cardamomensis (Malhotra, Thorpe, Mrinalini & Stuart, 2011)
- Trimeresurus rubeus (Malhotra, Thorpe, Mrinalini & Stuart, 2011)
- Xenophrys lekaguli (Stuart, Chuaynkern, Chan-ard & Inger, 2006)
