= Odorrana wuchuanensis =

Conservation status
- Vulnerable (IUCN 3.1)

Scientific classification
- Kingdom: Animalia
- Phylum: Chordata
- Class: Amphibia
- Order: Anura
- Family: Ranidae
- Genus: Odorrana
- Species: O. wuchuanensis

Binomial name
- Odorrana wuchuanensis (Xu, 1983)

Synonyms
- Rana wuchuanensis Xu, 1983; Huia wuchuanensis (Xu, 1983)

Species of frog

Odorrana wuchuanensis, also known as the Wuchuan odorous frog or Wuchuan frog, is a species of frog in the family Ranidae. It is endemic to southern–central China: Guizhou, Guanxi, and Hubei provinces. For a long time, it was only known from a single limestone cave in Baicun, Wuchuan. Adults live in limestone caves in karst areas, often on cliffs inside caves, near ponds. Tadpoles can be found also outside cases.
