= Odorrana nasuta =

Conservation status
- Least Concern (IUCN 3.1)

Scientific classification
- Kingdom: Animalia
- Phylum: Chordata
- Class: Amphibia
- Order: Anura
- Family: Ranidae
- Genus: Odorrana
- Species: O. nasuta

Binomial name
- Odorrana nasuta Li, Ye, and Fei, 2001

Synonyms
- Huai nasuta (Li, Ye, and Fei, 2001); Rana nasuta (Li, Ye, and Fei, 2001); Bamburana nasuta (Li, Ye, and Fei, 2001)

Species of amphibian

Odorrana nasuta (Hainan bamboo-leaf frog) is a species of frog in the family Ranidae, endemic to Hainan, China. It occurs near streams in forested regions at elevations of 350–850 m (1,150–2,790 ft) above sea level. Breeding takes place in streams. The species is threatened by habitat loss caused by smallholder farming and clear-cutting of forests.

The genus Odorrana, commonly known as odorous frogs, is a group of frogs (Rinadae) which can be found mostly in East Asia. These frogs are typically associated with fast-flowing mountain streams and often exhibit a distinctive pointed snout. Odorrana currently includes 65 recognized species, with many endemic to China.

== Description ==
Males measure 57–63 mm (2.2–2.5 in) and females 73–74 mm (2.9–2.9 in) in snout–vent length.
