= Odorrana tiannanensis =

Conservation status
- Least Concern (IUCN 3.1)

Scientific classification
- Kingdom: Animalia
- Phylum: Chordata
- Class: Amphibia
- Order: Anura
- Family: Ranidae
- Genus: Odorrana
- Species: O. tiannanensis

Binomial name
- Odorrana tiannanensis (Yang & Li, 1980)

Synonyms
- Rana tiannanensis Yang & Li, 1980; Rana (Odorrana) megatympanum Bain et al., 2003; Rana heatwolei Stuart and Bain, 2005; Rana tabaca

Species of frog

Odorrana tiannanensis is a species of frog in the family Ranidae that is found in southern China, northern Laos, and northern Vietnam. It is an uncommon species that appears to be in decline, at least in China. It lives near or in montane streams and rivers at altitudes of 120–1,000 m (390–3,280 ft). It is threatened by habitat loss and collection for consumption as food.
