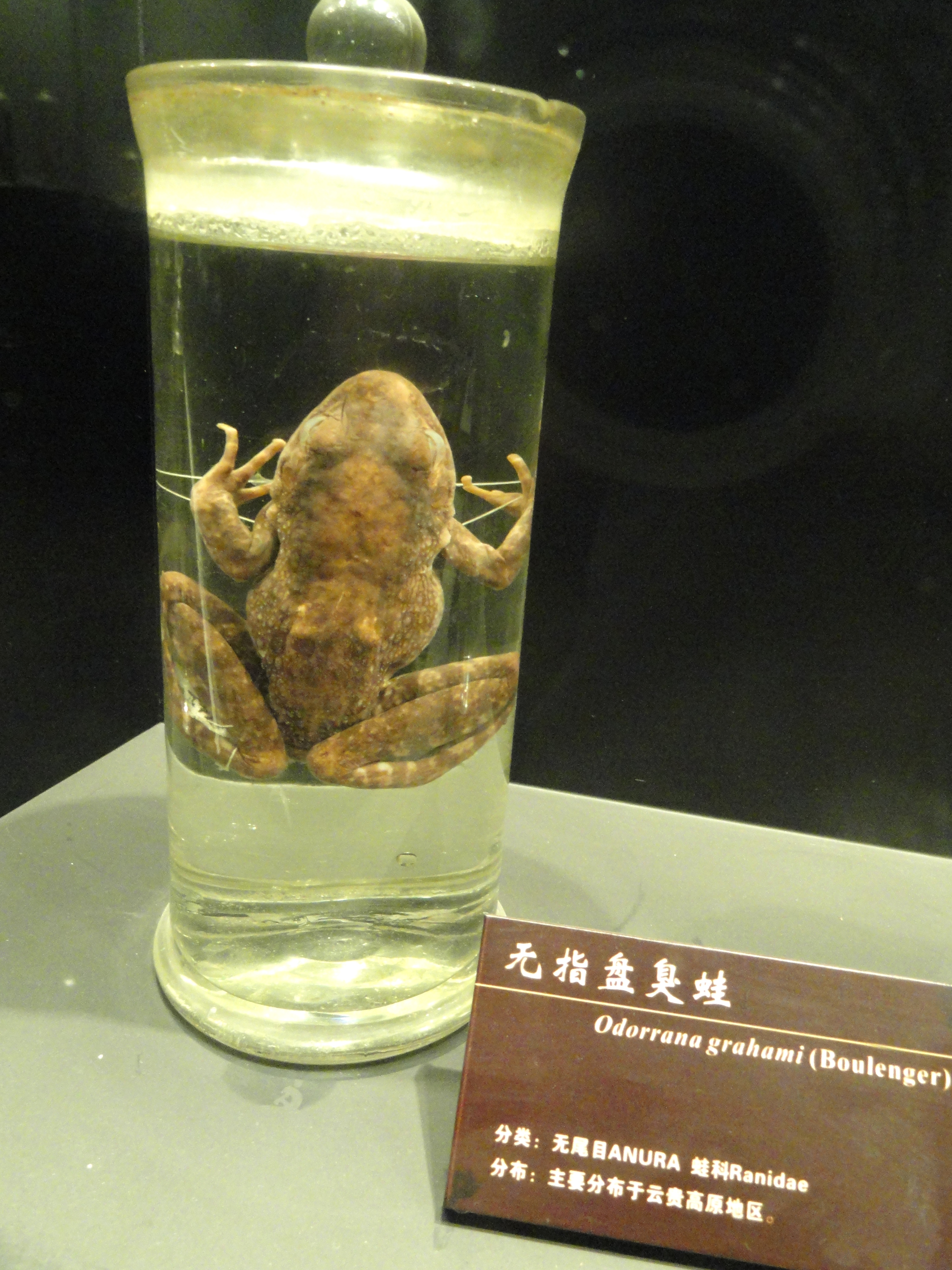

Conservation status
- Vulnerable (IUCN 3.1)

Scientific classification
- Kingdom: Animalia
- Phylum: Chordata
- Class: Amphibia
- Order: Anura
- Family: Ranidae
- Genus: Odorrana
- Species: O. grahami

Binomial name
- Odorrana grahami (Boulenger, 1917)

Synonyms
- Huia grahami (Boulenger, 1917); Rana grahami Boulenger, 1917

= Odorrana grahami =

Species of frog

Graham's frog (Odorrana grahami) – also known as the diskless-fingered odorous frog – is a species of frog in the family Ranidae. It is found in China (Sichuan, Yunnan, Guizhou, and possibly Hunan) and Vietnam (in Hoàng Liên National Park in the north). Presumably it is also found in Myanmar in areas adjacent to its Chinese distribution area.

== Habitat ==
Its natural habitats are subtropical or tropical moist montane forests, subtropical or tropical dry shrubland, temperate grassland, subtropical or tropical seasonally wet or flooded lowland grassland, rivers, and freshwater marshes. It is becoming rare due to habitat loss.

== Description ==
Odorrana grahami is a relatively large frog, with males reaching 76 mm (3.0 in) and females 92 mm (3.6 in) in length.

The skin secretions of Odorrana grahami have been subject to biochemical studies, yielding for example antimicrobial peptides.
