= Odorrana sinica =

Conservation status
- Data Deficient (IUCN 3.1)

Scientific classification
- Kingdom: Animalia
- Phylum: Chordata
- Class: Amphibia
- Order: Anura
- Family: Ranidae
- Genus: Odorrana
- Species: O. sinica

Binomial name
- Odorrana sinica (Ahl, 1927)

Synonyms
- Rana sinica Ahl, 1927

Species of amphibian

Odorrana sinica is a species of frogs in the family Ranidae that is endemic to China.

Its status is insufficiently known as it is only known from the type specimen collected from an unspecific location.
