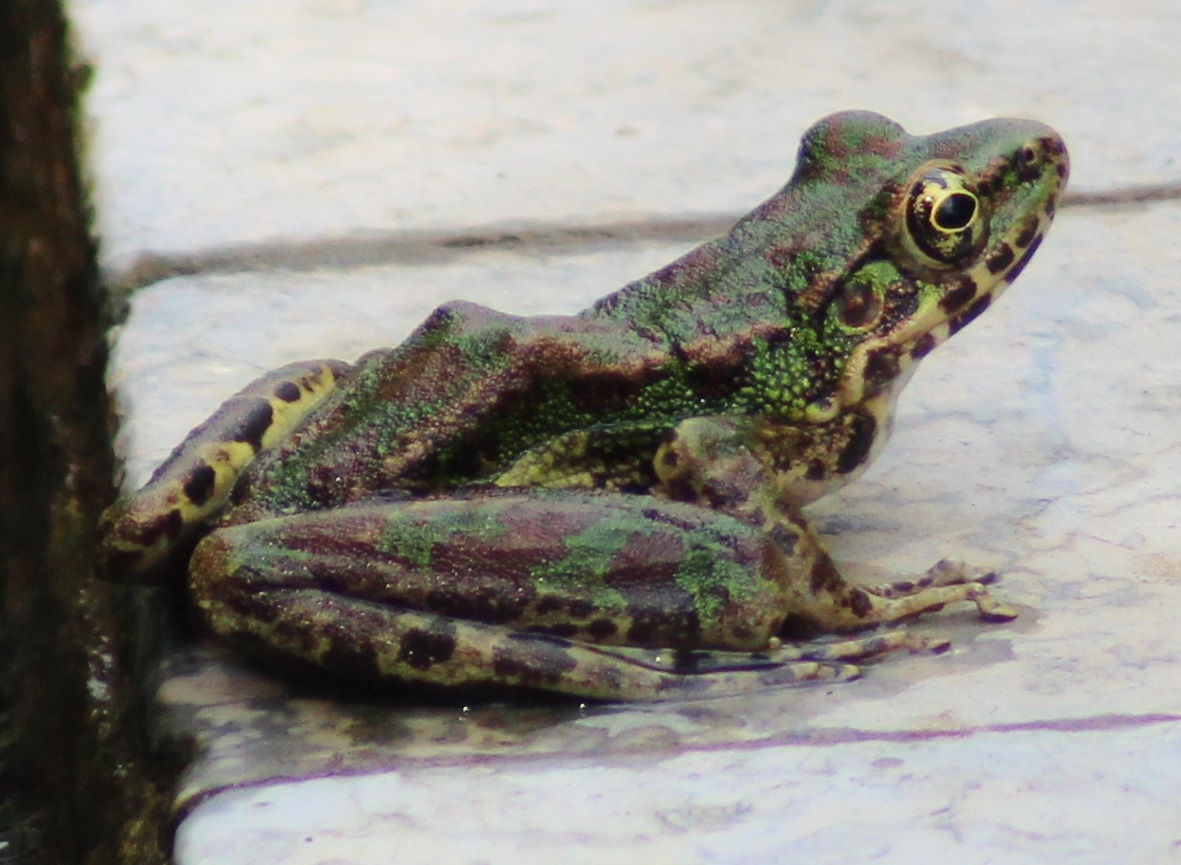

Conservation status
- Least Concern (IUCN 3.1)

Scientific classification
- Kingdom: Animalia
- Phylum: Chordata
- Class: Amphibia
- Order: Anura
- Family: Ranidae
- Genus: Odorrana
- Species: O. schmackeri

Binomial name
- Odorrana schmackeri (Boettger, 1892)

Synonyms
- Rana schmackeri Boettger, 1892

= Odorrana schmackeri =

Species of amphibian

Odorrana schmackeri (common names: Schmacker's frog, piebald odorous frog, Kaochahien frog) is a species of frog in the family Ranidae. It is endemic to China and distributed in southern and south-central China. Reports from Thailand and Vietnam.

Its natural habitats are streams of different sizes and the surrounding forests. It is considered as of "Least Concern" by the International Union for Conservation of Nature (IUCN), although habitat loss and exploitation are threats to this species.

Male Odorrana schmackeri grow to a snout–vent length of about 44 mm (1.7 in) and females to 80 mm (3.1 in). Tadpoles are up to 45 mm (1.8 in) in length.
