= Amolops daorum =

Conservation status
- Least Concern (IUCN 3.1)

Scientific classification
- Kingdom: Animalia
- Phylum: Chordata
- Class: Amphibia
- Order: Anura
- Family: Ranidae
- Genus: Amolops
- Species: A. daorum

Binomial name
- Amolops daorum (Bain, Lathrop, Murphy, Orlov, and Ho, 2003)

Synonyms
- Rana (Odorrana) daorum Bain, Lathrop, Murphy, Orlov, and Ho, 2003; Odorrana daorum (Bain, Lathrop, Murphy, Orlov, and Ho, 2003); Huia daorum (Bain, Lathrop, Murphy, Orlov, and Ho, 2003)

Species of frog

Amolops daorum is a species of frog in the family Ranidae. It is known from its type locality in the vicinity of Sa Pa in northern Vietnam near the Chinese border, Hong Kong, and Houaphanh Province in eastern Laos; presumably it also occurs the intervening areas. The Hong Kong record is considered suspicious, however.

== Etymology ==
The specific name daorum refers to the Dao people of northern Vietnam. Common name Dao frog has been coined for this species.

== Taxonomy ==
Amolops daorum was described in 2003 as Rana daorum based on specimens from northern Vietnam. In 2007, Ohler concluded that it is a junior synonym of Amolops mengyangensis, but this conclusion was challenged by Stuart, Biju, and others who considered it valid as Amolops daorum. As of late 2018, the Amphibian Species of the World and AmphibiaWeb databases recognize Amolops daorum as a valid species. Meanwhile, placement of this species in the genus Odorrana appears to have been caused by a DNA sample allegedly representing this species actually coming from Odorrana hmongorum.

== Description ==
Adult males measure 32–38 mm (1.3–1.5 in) and adult females 53–58 mm (2.1–2.3 in) in snout–vent length. The body is dorsoventrally compressed. The tympanum is distinct and round. The finger and the toe tips bear discs. The toes are fully webbed. The dorsum is green and occasionally has black spots. The flanks are brown and bear at least one large white glandular spot. A white lip stripe runs from the nostril to above the arm insertion. The tympanum and the loreal region are dark brown. The venter is creamy white.

== Habitat and conservation ==
The type series of Amolops daorum was collected from and near streams: the males were on partially submerged rocks in cascades as well as in vegetation adjacent to the streams, whereas females were found slightly farther away from streams in denser vegetation. The elevation at the locality was 1,400 m (4,600 ft) above sea level.

As of late 2022, Amolops daorum has been assessed as least concern an independent species for the IUCN Red List of Threatened Species but included in Amolops mengyangensis.
