= Odorrana jingdongensis =

Conservation status
- Vulnerable (IUCN 3.1)

Scientific classification
- Kingdom: Animalia
- Phylum: Chordata
- Class: Amphibia
- Order: Anura
- Family: Ranidae
- Genus: Odorrana
- Species: O. jingdongensis

Binomial name
- Odorrana jingdongensis Fei, Ye, and Li, 2001

Synonyms
- Rana jingdongensis (Fei, Ye, and Li, 2001); Rana (Odorrana) hmongorum Bain, Lathrop, Murphy, Orlov, and Ho, 2003; Odorrana hmongorum (Bain, Lathrop, Murphy, Orlov, and Ho, 2003); Huia hmongorum (Bain, Lathrop, Murphy, Orlov, and Ho, 2003); Huia jingdongensis (Fei, Ye, and Li, 2001)

Species of amphibian

Odorrana jingdongensis is a species of frogs in the family Ranidae. It is known from southern China (western and southern Yunnan, southern Guangxi) and northern Vietnam (Tùng Vài forest in Hà Giang Province and Fansipan in Lào Cai Province), though it quite likely also occurs in the adjacent areas in Laos and in Myanmar. Its name refers to its type locality, Jingdong Yi Autonomous County in Yunnan. Common name Jingdong frog has been coined for it.

== Description ==
Males measure 53–82 mm (2.1–3.2 in) and females 65–108 mm (2.6–4.3 in) in snout–vent length; on average, adult males measure 75 mm (3.0 in) and adult females 97 mm (3.8 in) in snout–vent length. The tympanum is distinct. The toes are fully webbed and the toe discs are large. The dorsum is scattered with tubercles and large warts. The lips and sides of the head bear white spines. Lips have vertical bars. The dorsum is mostly green with brown and black spots.

== Habitat and conservation ==
Odorrana jingdongensis live in and near montane streams (in particular near waterfalls) in forested areas at elevations of 1,000–1,900 m (3,300–6,200 ft) above sea level; the species has also been recorded along the mossy slopes of a man-made culvert. Breeding takes place in streams where also the tadpoles develop.

The species is threatened by habitat loss and overexploitation for food. Previously common, it is now reported to be rare. Its range overlaps with some protected areas.
