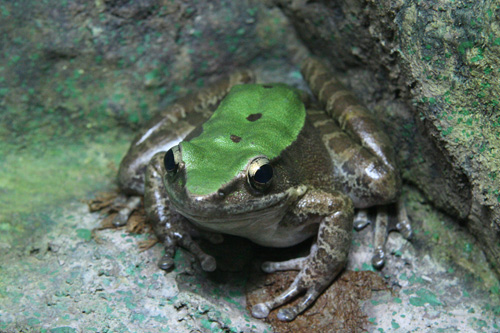

Conservation status
- Data Deficient (IUCN 3.1)

Scientific classification
- Kingdom: Animalia
- Phylum: Chordata
- Class: Amphibia
- Order: Anura
- Family: Ranidae
- Genus: Odorrana
- Species: O. livida

Binomial name
- Odorrana livida (Blyth, 1856)

Synonyms
- Polypedates lividus Blyth, 1856; Huia livida (Blyth, 1856); Rana livida (Blyth, 1856)

= Odorrana livida =

Green mountain frog

Species of frog

Odorrana livida, also known as the green mountain frog, green cascade frog, Tenasserim frog, bright frog, large odorous frog, or large-eared rock frog, is a species of frog in the family Ranidae. It is known with certainty only from its neotype locality at the Dawna Range in Myanmar, near the border to Thailand, but molecular data suggest that it is present in northeastern India and in peninsular Thailand too, while records from China refer to other species. In much of the literature, this species has been confused with other species, including Odorrana graminea.

== Description ==
Adult females measure 89–97 mm (3.5–3.8 in) in snout–vent length (neotype and a referred specimen); males are presumably much smaller. The body is dorsoventrally compressed. The head is broad and the snout is rounded. The tympanum is round and distinct; the supratympanic fold is weak. The fingers and toes have well-developed discs; the toes are fully webbed. Preserved specimens have uniformly brown dorsum; the limbs are lighter brown, without transverse bars.

== Habitat and conservation ==
Little precise information on ecological requirements of this species is available. It probably occurs near fast-flowing rivers and streams in montane tropical forests. Breeding presumably takes places in the streams. Its conservation status is insufficiently known.
