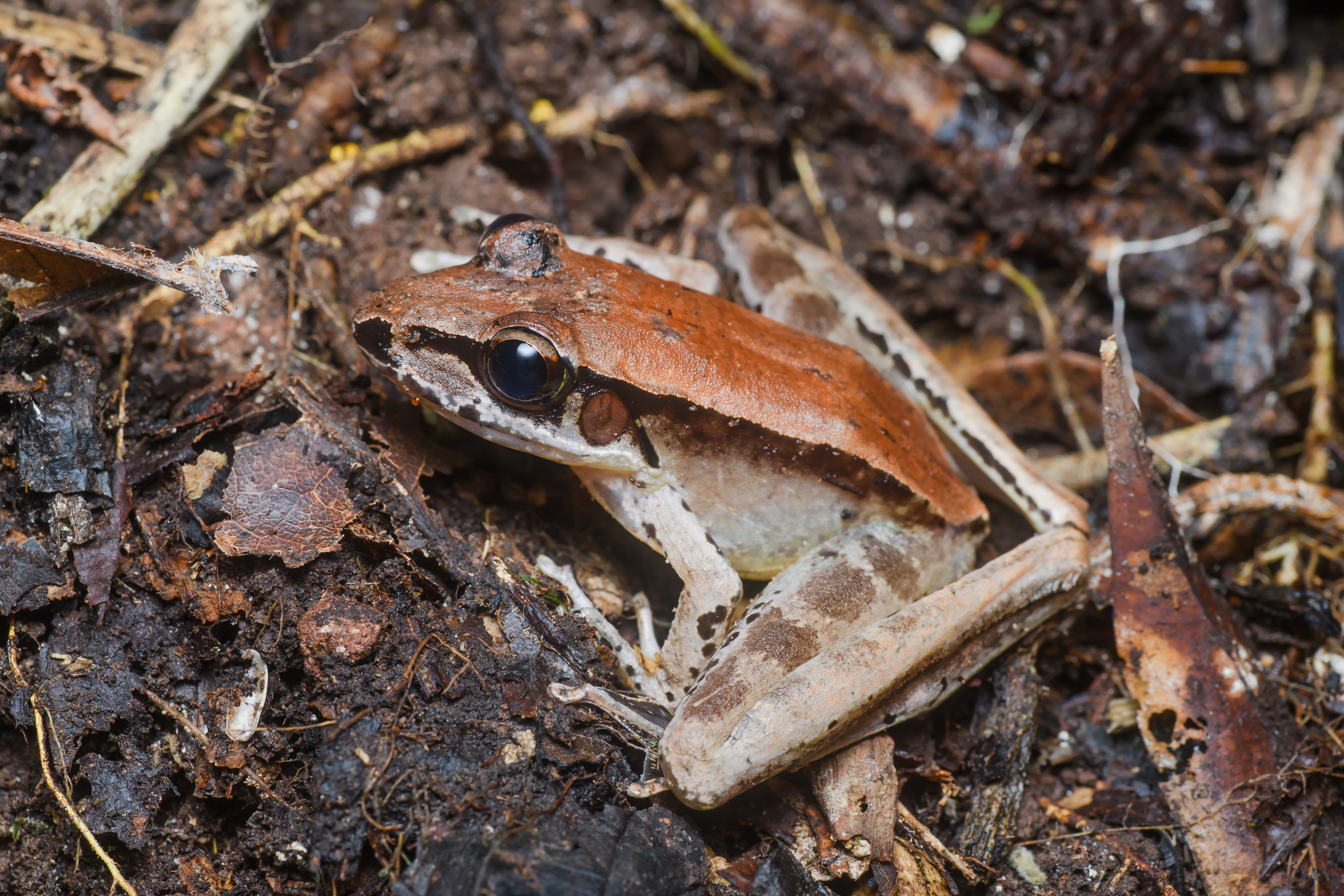

Conservation status
- Least Concern (IUCN 3.1)

Scientific classification
- Kingdom: Animalia
- Phylum: Chordata
- Class: Amphibia
- Order: Anura
- Family: Ranidae
- Genus: Odorrana
- Species: O. nasica

Binomial name
- Odorrana nasica (Boulenger, 1903)

Synonyms
- Rana nasica Boulenger, 1903; Amolops mengyangensis Wu & Tian, 1995; Huia nasica (Boulenger, 1903)

= Long-snout torrent frog =

Species of amphibian

The long-snout torrent frog (Odorrana nasica) is a species of frogs in the family Ranidae.

It is found in China, Laos, Thailand, Vietnam, and possibly Myanmar. Its natural habitats are subtropical or tropical moist lowland forests, subtropical or tropical moist montane forests, and rivers. It is not considered threatened by the IUCN.
