= Odorrana versabilis =

Conservation status
- Least Concern (IUCN 3.1)

Scientific classification
- Kingdom: Animalia
- Phylum: Chordata
- Class: Amphibia
- Order: Anura
- Family: Ranidae
- Genus: Odorrana
- Species: O. versabilis

Binomial name
- Odorrana versabilis (Liu & Hu, 1962)

Synonyms
- Rana versabilis Liu & Hu, 1962

Species of frog

Odorrana versabilis is a species of frog in the family Ranidae that is endemic to China.

Its natural habitats are subtropical or tropical moist lowland forests, subtropical or tropical moist montane forests, and rivers. It is not considered threatened by the IUCN.
