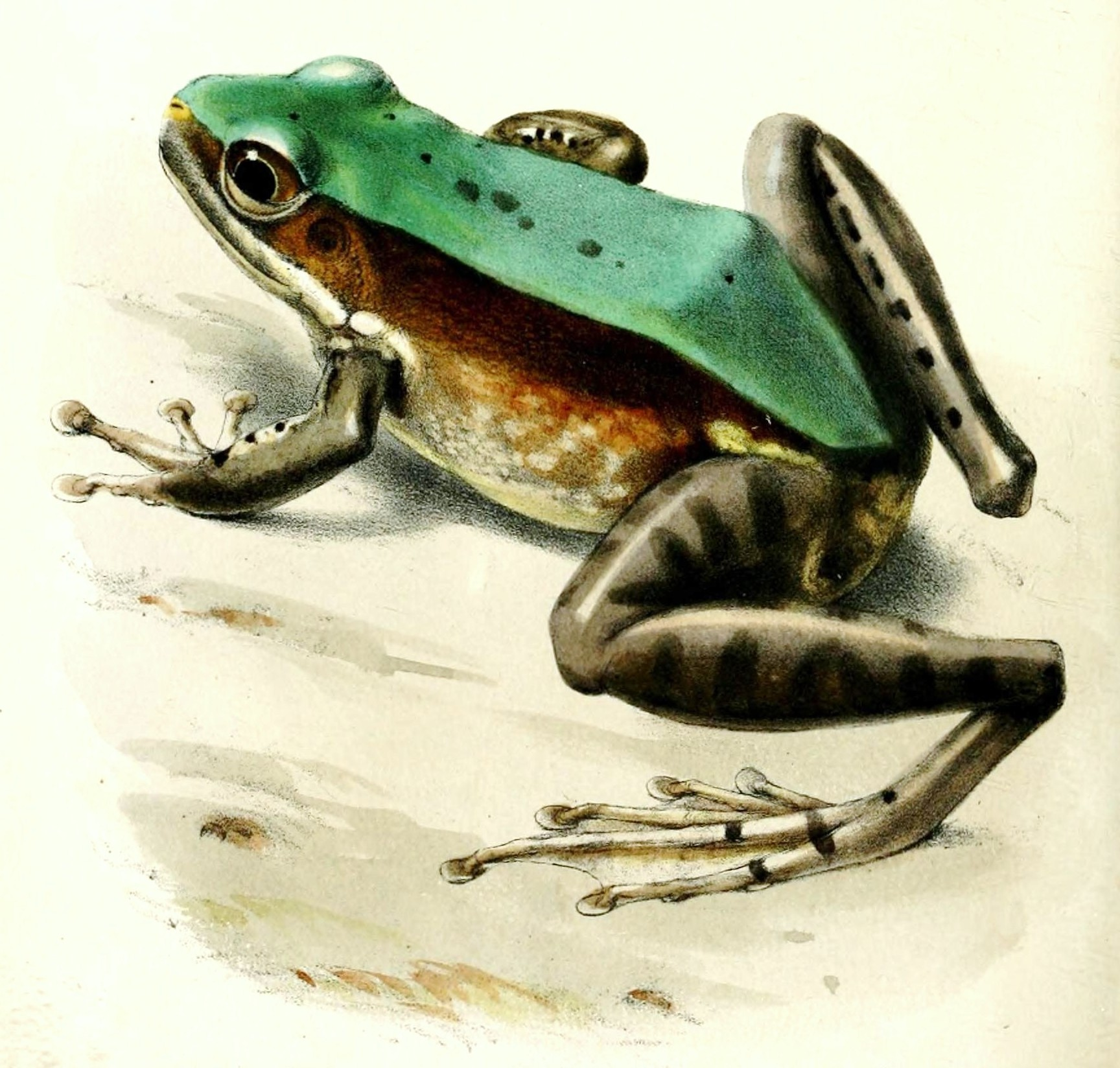

Conservation status
- Least Concern (IUCN 3.1)

Scientific classification
- Kingdom: Animalia
- Phylum: Chordata
- Class: Amphibia
- Order: Anura
- Family: Ranidae
- Genus: Odorrana
- Species: O. chloronota

Binomial name
- Odorrana chloronota (Günther, 1875)

Synonyms
- Polypedates chloronotus Günther, 1876; Huia chloronota (Günther, 1875); Rana chloronota (Günther, 1875)

= Odorrana chloronota =

Species of frog

Odorrana chloronota, commonly known as the chloronate huia frog or copper-cheeked frog, is a species of frog in the family Ranidae that is found in Cambodia, China, India, Laos, Myanmar, Thailand, Vietnam, and possibly Bangladesh and Nepal.

Its natural habitats are subtropical or tropical moist lowland forests, subtropical or tropical moist montane forests, and rivers. It is not considered threatened by the IUCN. Another variety of frog which has recently been discovered at Arunachal Pradesh in India and closely resembles the O chloronota is named as Odorrana arunachalensis due to the black stripes on its eyes.

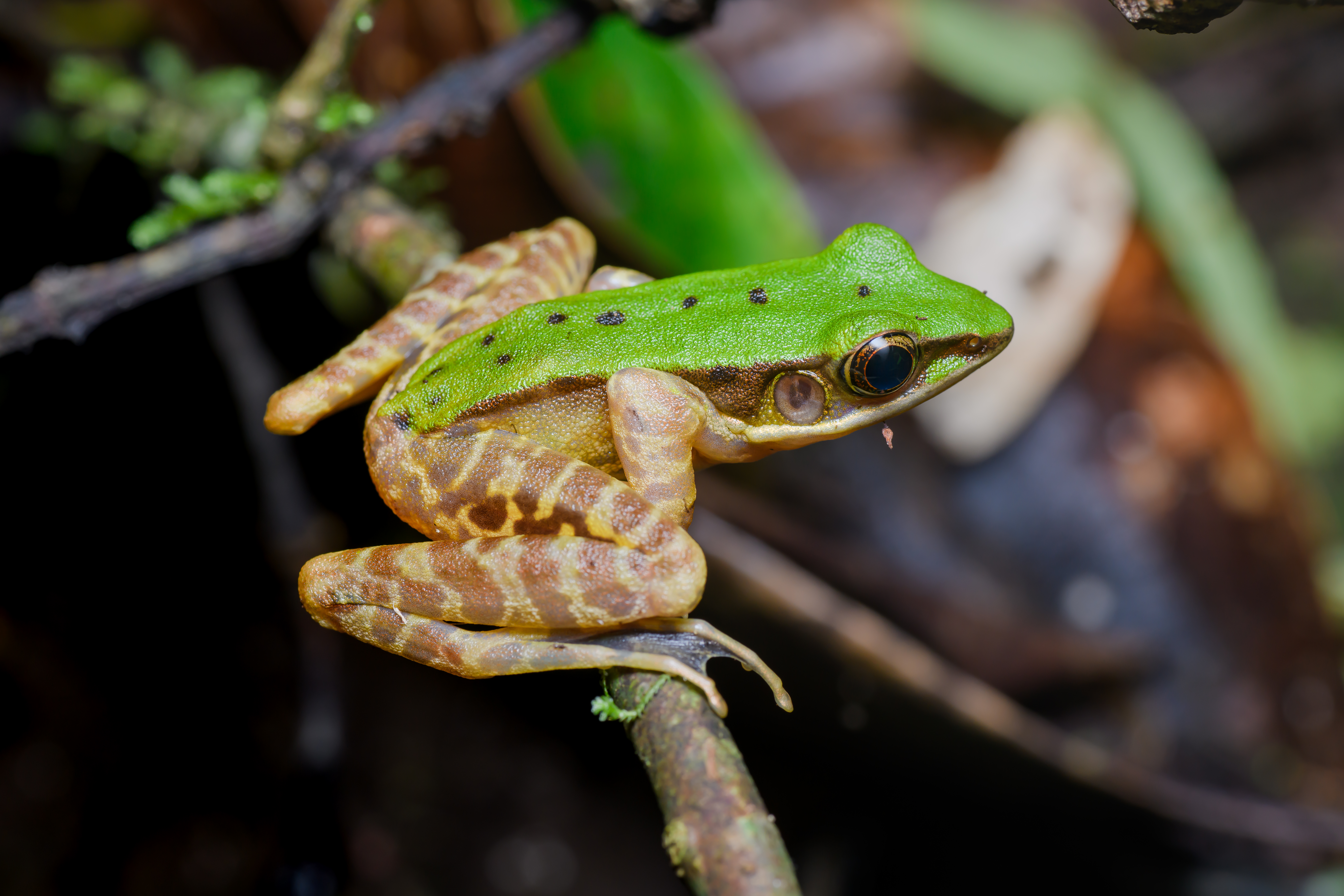
O. chloronota from Doi Phu Kha National Park, Thailand.
