= Odorrana andersonii =

Conservation status
- Least Concern (IUCN 3.1)

Scientific classification
- Kingdom: Animalia
- Phylum: Chordata
- Class: Amphibia
- Order: Anura
- Family: Ranidae
- Genus: Odorrana
- Species: O. andersonii

Binomial name
- Odorrana andersonii (Boulenger, 1882)

Synonyms
- Rana andersonii Boulenger, 1882; Polypedates yunnanensis Anderson, 1879

Species of frog

Odorrana andersonii (common names: golden cross band frog, Yunnan odorous frog, Anderson's frog) is a species of frog in the family Ranidae.

== Location ==
It is found in northeastern India, Upper Myanmar, southwestern China (Yunnan, Guizhou and Guangxi), northern Thailand, Laos, and Vietnam; records from Laos and Vietnam may refer to another species. They are found in low tree branches and on rocks along shaded rocky streams and large rivers with boulders, in evergreen forests and agricultural areas. Breeds takes place in streams.

== Characteristics ==
Odorrana andersonii are relatively large frogs: males grow to a snout–vent length of about 74 mm (2.9 in) and females to 97 mm (3.8 in). Tadpoles are up to 50 mm (2.0 in) in length.

== Conservation status ==
Odorrana andersonii is considered as being of "Least Concern" by the International Union for Conservation of Nature (IUCN), although over-exploitation for food and habitat change are threats to this species.
