= List of amphibians of China =

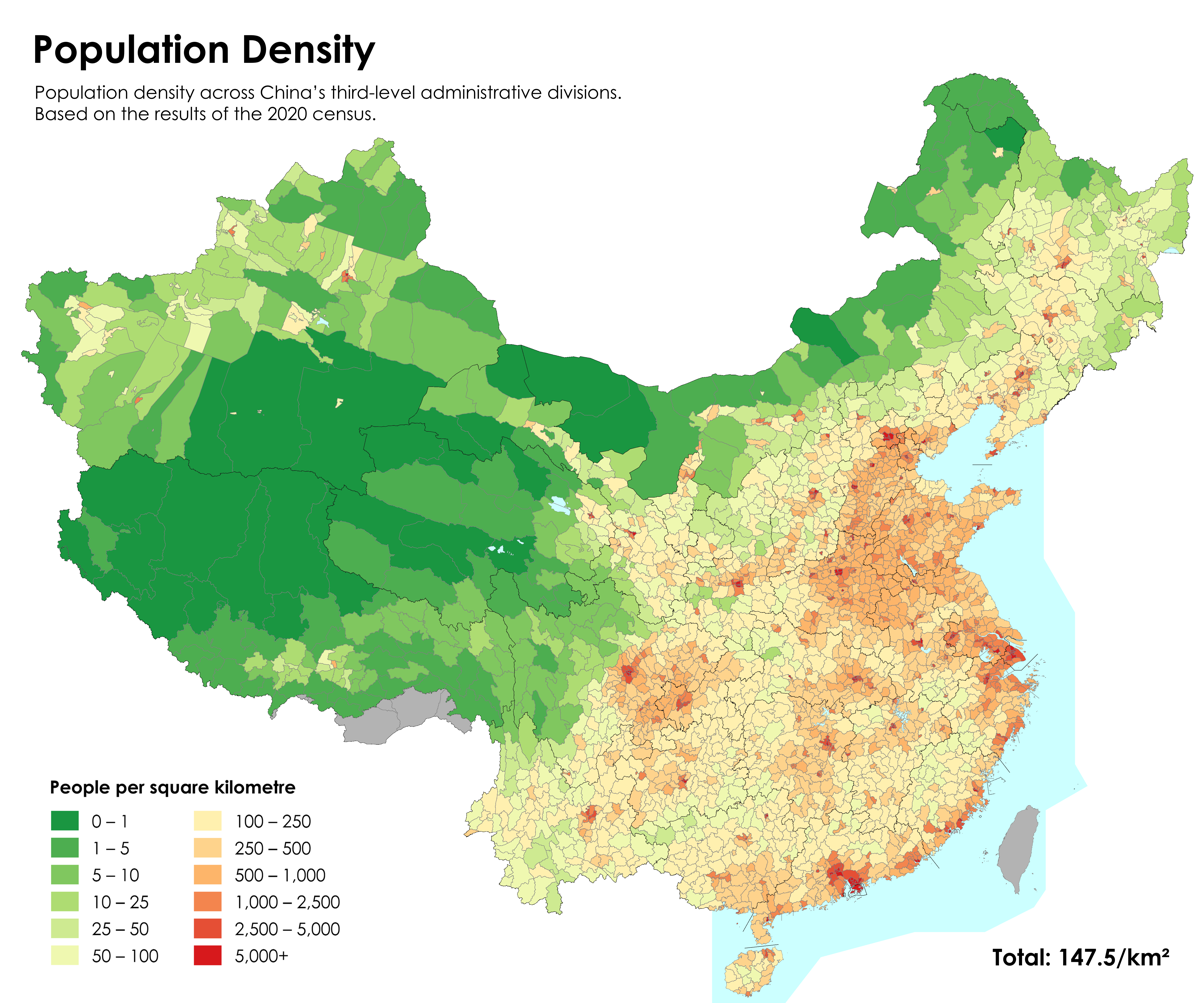

China is home to 346 species of amphibian. China's amphibian diversity is greater than any other country in the Old World, and it is the 5th in the whole world. China's amphibian fauna includes an important element of widespread, generally non-threatened species though 27.3% of amphibian species are extinct or threatened and because conservation assessments of Chinese amphibians have only started recently, it is likely that the current data on threats to amphibians are insufficient. Several amphibian species in China have very limited geographical distributions.

== Frogs ==
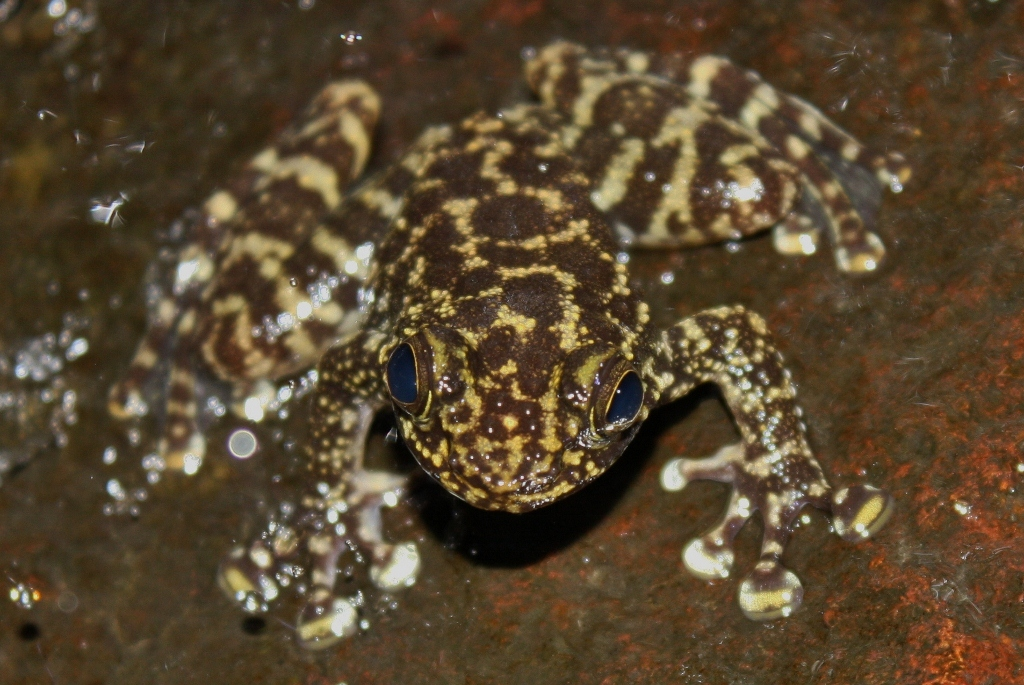
Amolops hongkongensis

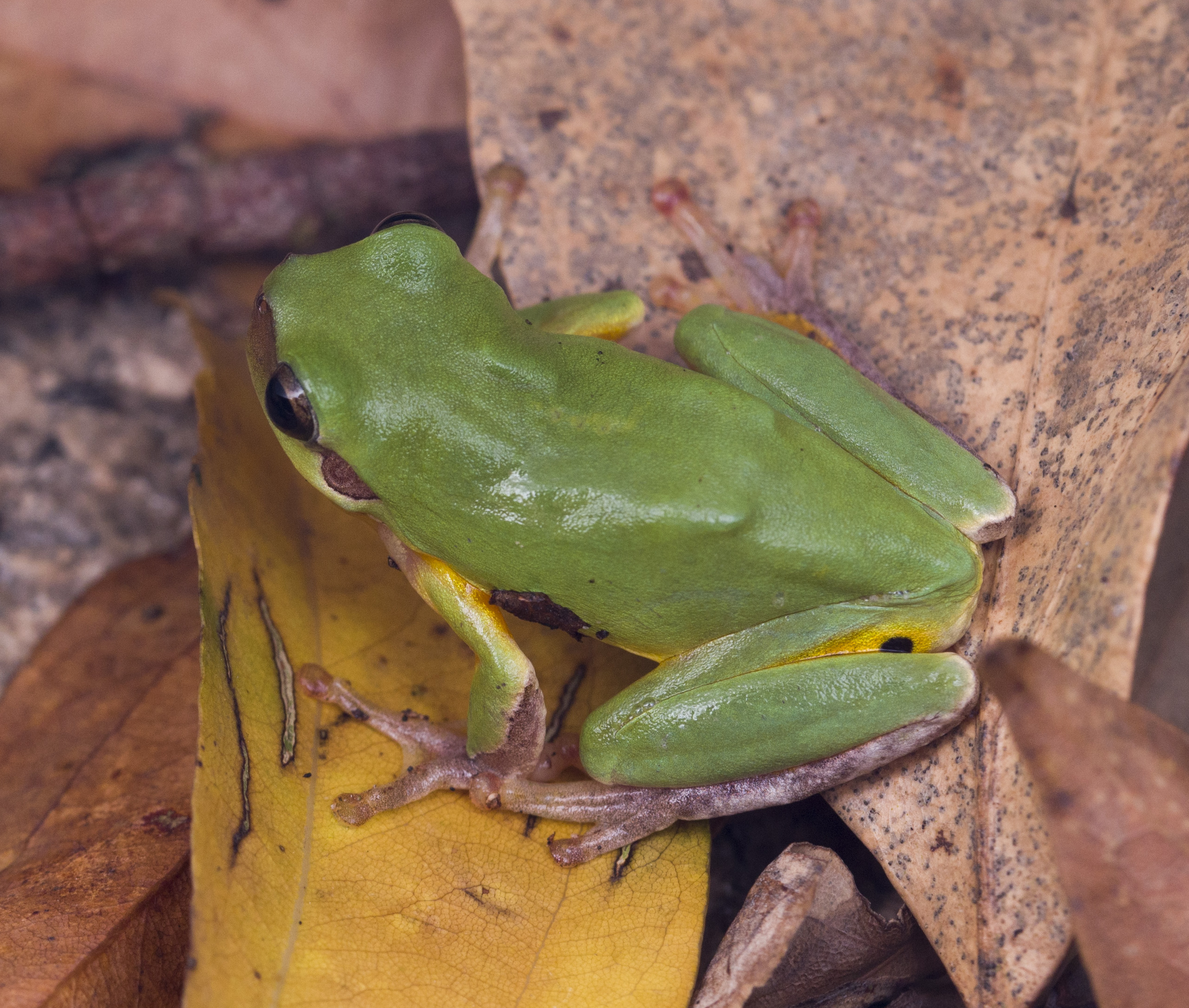

=== True frogs (Ranidae) ===
- Chevron-spotted brown frog
- Eastern golden frog
- Glandirana minima
- Glandirana tientaiensis
- Huanren frog
- Imienpo Station frog
- Johns' groove-toed frog
- Korean brown frog
- Emei music frog
- Nidirana adenopleura
- Nidirana hainanensis
- Nadirana lini
- Nidirana pleuraden
- Odorrana andersonii
- Odorrana anlungensis
- Odorrana chapaensis
- Odorrana chloronota
- Odorrana exiliversabilis
- Odorrana grahami
- Odorrana graminea
- Odorrana hejiangensis
- Odorrana kuangwuensis
- Odorrana lungshengensis
- Odorrana margaretae
- Odorrana mutschmanni
- Odorrana schmackeri
- Odorrana tiannanensis
- Odorrana versabilis
- Odorrana wuchuanensis
- Pelophylax fukienensis
- Pelophylax hubeiensis
- Pelophylax lateralis
- Pelophylax nigromaculatus
- Pelophylax tenggerensis
- Pelophylax terentievi
- Plateau brown frog
- Rana amurensis
- Rana chensinensis
- Rana omeimontis
- Rana sangzhiensis
- Rana weiningensis
- Rana zhengi

=== Cascade frogs (Amolops) ===
- Amolops aniqiaoensis
- Amolops chaochin
- Amolops bellulus
- Amolops chunganensis
- Amolops gerbillus
- Amolops granulosus
- Amolops hainanensis
- Amolops jinjiangensis
- Amolops kangtingensis
- Amolops liangshanensis
- Amolops lifanensis
- Amolops loloensis
- Amolops mantzorum
- Amolops medogensis
- Amolops monticola
- Amolops ricketti
- Amolops torrentis
- Amolops viridimaculatus
- Amolops wuyiensis

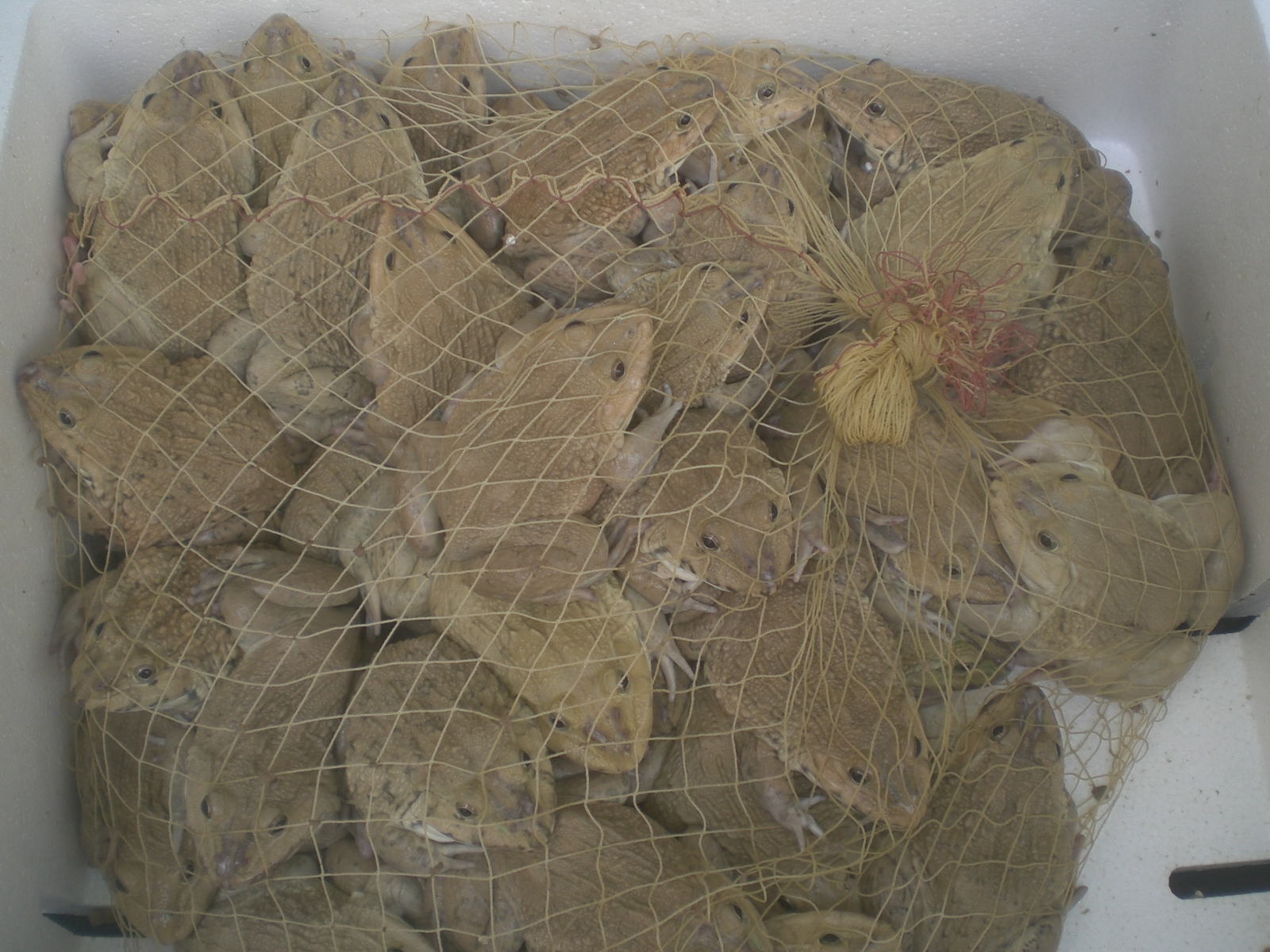
Chinese edible frogs in a net bag

=== Fork-tongued frogs (Dicroglossidae) ===
- Chinese edible frog
- Concave-eared torrent frog
- Doichang frog
- Fejervarya limnocharis
- Fejervarya moodiei
- Fejervarya multistriata
- Limnonectes longchuanensis
- Nanorana arnoldi
- Nanorana blanfordii
- Nanorana bourreti
- Nanorana conaensis
- Nanorana feae
- Nanorana liebigii
- Nanorana maculosa
- Nanorana medogensis
- Nanorana pleskei
- Nanorana polunini
- Nanorana quadranus
- Nanorana taihangnica
- Nanorana unculuanus
- Nanorana ventripunctata
- Nanorana yunnanensis
- Northern frog
- Kuhl's creek frog
- Quasipaa verrucospinosa
- Quasipaa boulengeri
- Quasipaa exilispinosa
- Quasipaa jiulongensis
- Quasipaa shini
- Quasipaa spinosa
- Quasipaa yei
- Round-tongued floating frog

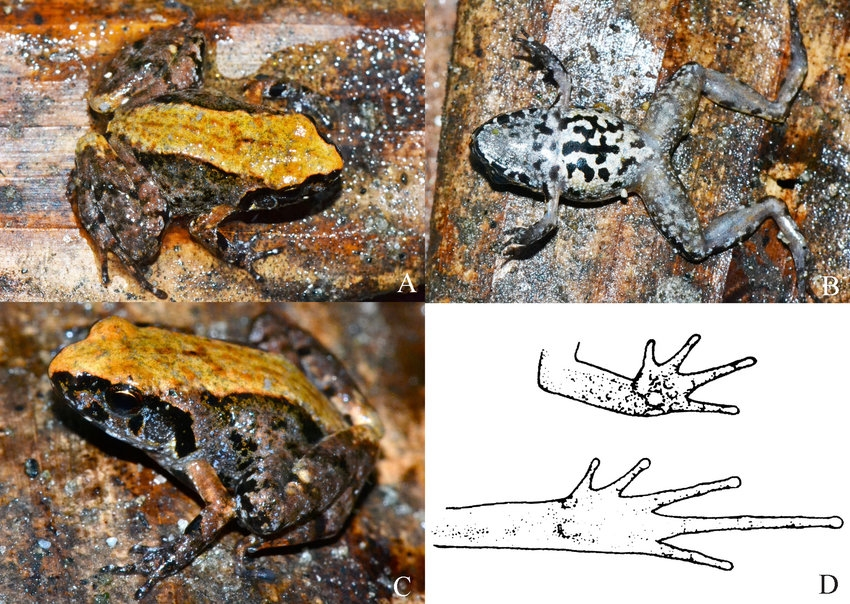

=== Ceratobatrachidae ===
There are at least four species of frog in this family that are endemic to the Himalayan mountains.

- Liurana alpina
- Liurana medogensis
- Liurana vallecula
- Liurana xizangensis

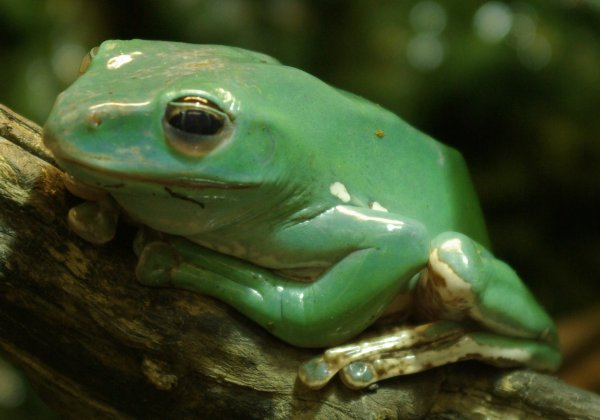
Common Chinese tree frog

=== Tree frogs ===
- Annam tree frog
- Common Chinese tree frog
- Hyla sanchiangensis
- Hyla zhaopingensis: only in Zhaoping County, Guangxi
- Hylarana latouchii
- Hylarana macrodactyla
- Hylarana taipehensis
- Japanese tree frog
- Chinese flying frog
- Feihyla palpebralis
- Gracixalus gracilipes
- Gracixalus jinxiuensis
- Gracixalus medogensis
- Gracixalus nonggangensis
- Kurixalus naso
- Kurixalus odontotarsus
- Kurixalus verrucosus
- Papurana milleti
- Raorchestes longchuanensis
- Raorchestes menglaensis
- Rhacophorus kio
- Rhacophorus nigropunctatus
- Rhacophorus rhodopus
- Rhacophorus tuberculatus
- Rohanixalus vittatus
- Romer's tree frog
- Sylvirana cubitalis
- Sylvirana guentheri
- Sylvirana maosonensis
- Sylvirana nigrovittata
- Sylvirana spinulosa
- Zhangixalus burmanus
- Zhangixalus chenfui
- Zhangixalus dennysi
- Zhangixalus dorsoviridis
- Zhangixalus dugritei
- Zhangixalus duboisi
- Zhangixalus feae
- Zhangixalus franki
- Zhangixalus hui
- Zhangixalus hongchibaensis
- Zhangixalus hungfuensis
- Zhangixalus leucofasciatus
- Zhangixalus lishuiensis
- Zhangixalus melanoleucus
- Zhangixalus minimus
- Zhangixalus moltrechti
- Rhacophorus nigropunctatus
- Zhangixalus omeimontis
- Zhangixalus puerensis
- Zhangixalus smaragdinus
- Zhangixalus taipeianus
- Zhangixalus wui
- Zhangixalus yaoshanensis
- Zhangixalus yinggelingensis
- Zhangixalus yunnanensis
- Zhangixalus zhoukaiyae

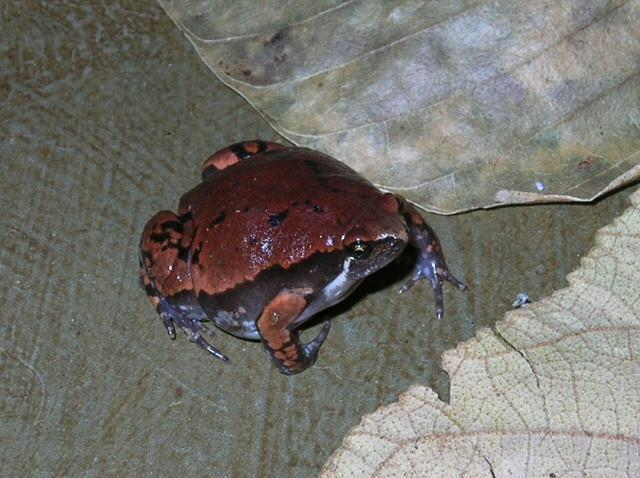

=== Microhylidae ===
- Calluella yunnanensis
- Boreal digging frog
- Kalophrynus interlineatus
- Kalophrynus menglienicus
- Kaloula nonggangensis
- Kaloula rugifera
- Kaloula verrucosa
- Microhyla berdmorei
- Microhyla fissipes
- Microhyla heymonsi
- Microhyla pulchra
- Micryletta inornata
- Microhyla butleri

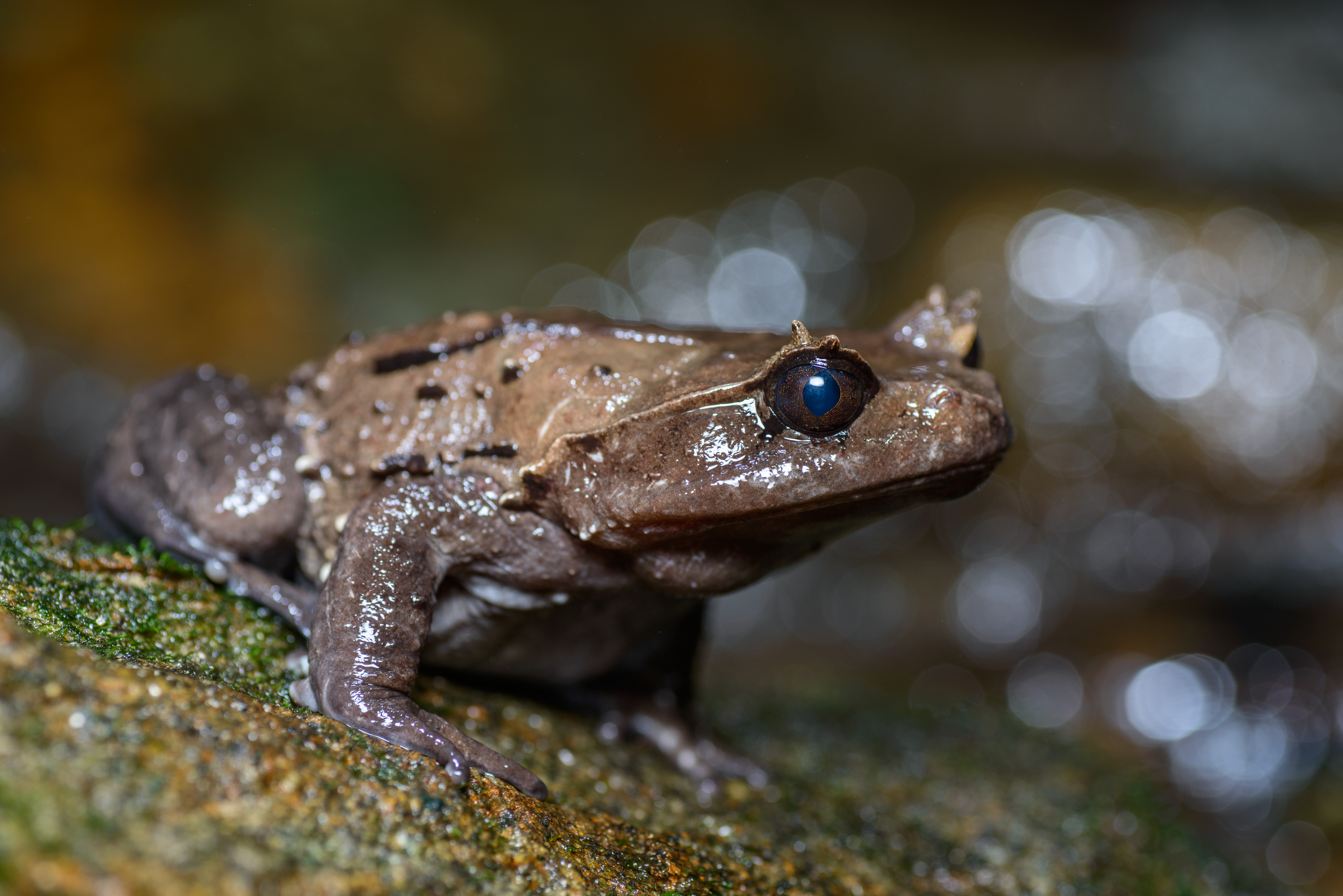
Brachytarsophrys carinense

=== Litter frogs ===
- Brachytarsophrys carinense
- Brachytarsophrys feae
- Brachytarsophrys popei
- Buergeria oxycephala
- Leptolalax alpinus
- Leptolalax liui
- Leptolalax oshanensis
- Leptolalax sungi
- Leptolalax tengchongensis
- Leptolalax ventripunctatus
- Megophrys binchuanensis
- Megophrys brachykolos
- Megophrys cheni
- Megophrys huangshanensis
- Megophrys lini
- Megophrys major
- Megophrys parva
- Megophrys sangzhiensis
- Megophrys shuichengensis
- Megophrys wawuensis
- Oreolalax chuanbeiensis
- Oreolalax granulosus
- Oreolalax jingdongensis
- Oreolalax liangbeiensis
- Oreolalax lichuanensis
- Oreolalax major
- Oreolalax multipunctatus
- Oreolalax nanjiangensis: only in Nanjiang County, Sichuan
- Oreolalax omeimontis
- Oreolalax pingii
- Oreolalax popei
- Oreolalax puxiongensis
- Oreolalax rhodostigmatus
- Oreolalax rugosus
- Oreolalax schmidti
- Oreolalax weigoldi
- Oreolalax xiangchengensis
- Scutiger boulengeri
- Scutiger brevipes
- Scutiger chintingensis
- Scutiger glandulatus
- Scutiger gongshanensis
- Scutiger jiulongensis
- Scutiger liupanensis
- Scutiger maculatus
- Scutiger mammatus
- Scutiger muliensis: only in Muli, Sichuan
- Scutiger ningshanensis
- Scutiger nyingchiensis
- Scutiger pingwuensis
- Scutiger sikimmensis
- Scutiger tuberculatus
- Scutiger wanglangensis

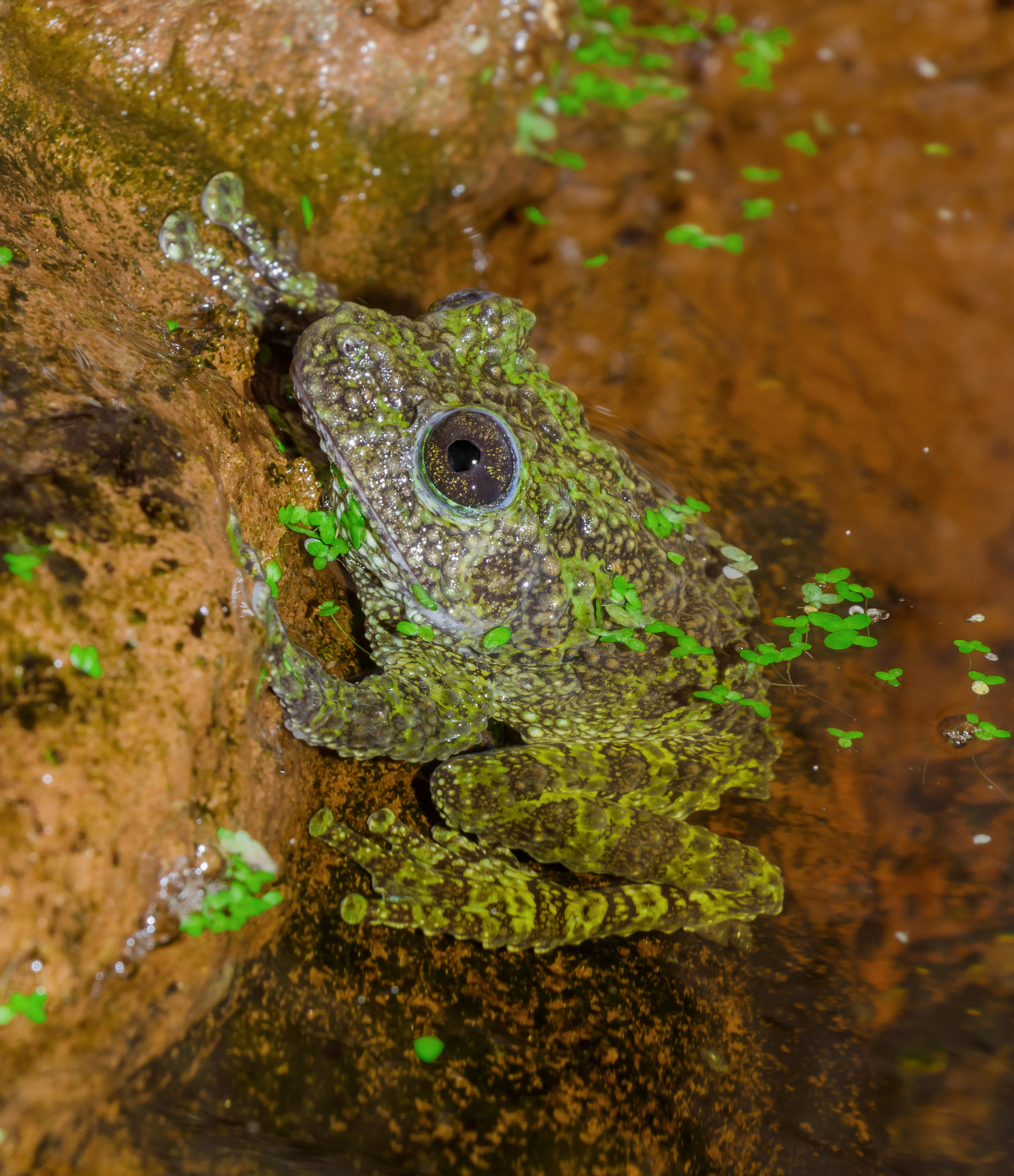

=== Shrub frogs (Rhacophoridae) ===
- Liuixalus hainanus
- Liuixalus ocellatus
- Theloderma kwangsiense: only in Dayaoshan Nature Reserve, Guangxi
- Philautus kempii
- Polypedates impresus
- Polypedates megacephalus
- Polypedates mutus
- Theloderma asperum
- Theloderma kwangsiense
- Theloderma moloch
- Theloderma rhododiscus

=== Salt water frogs ===
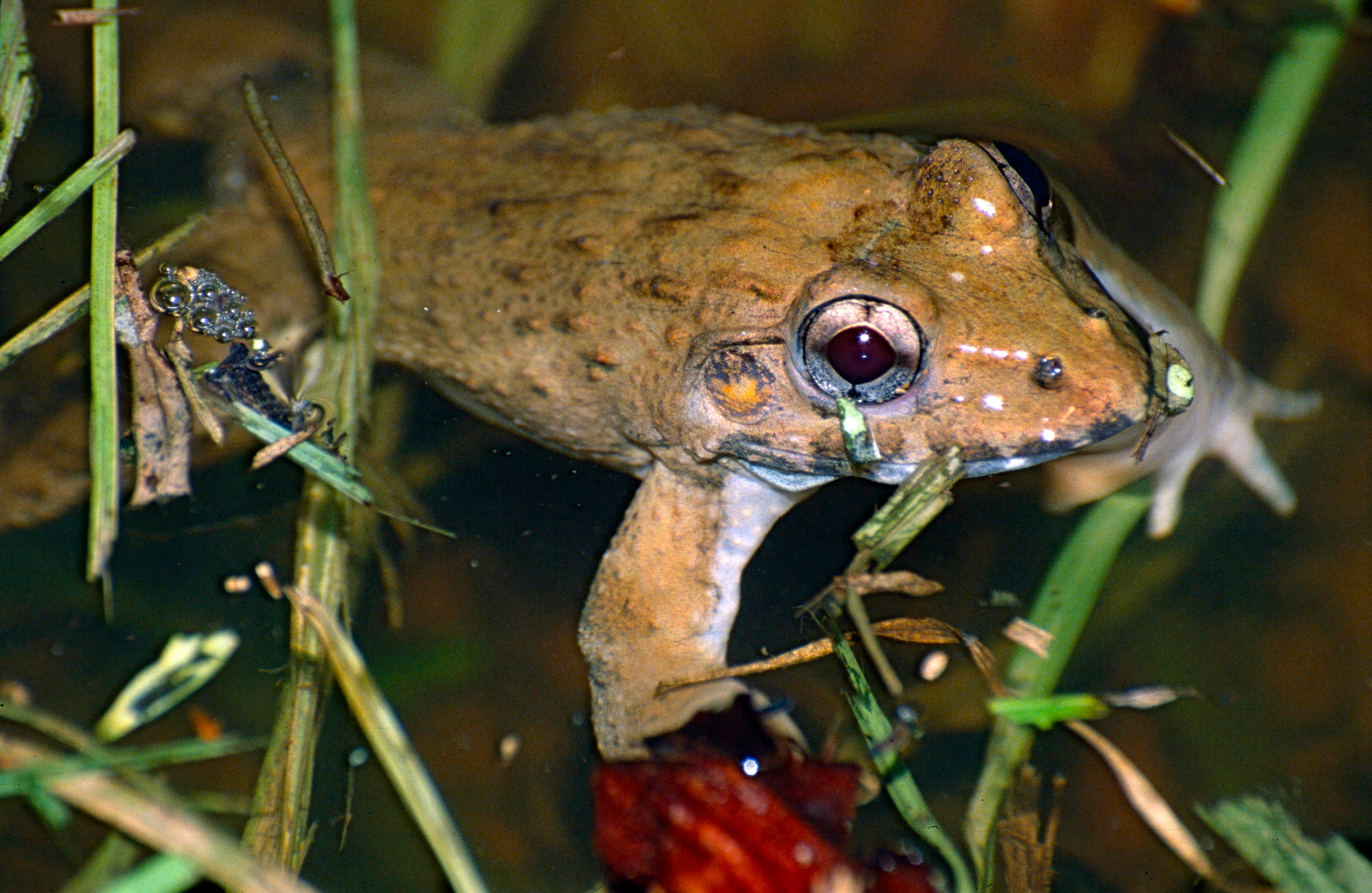

China is home to one of only 144 known modern amphibians which can tolerate brief excursions into sea water.

- Crab-eating frog

== Toads ==
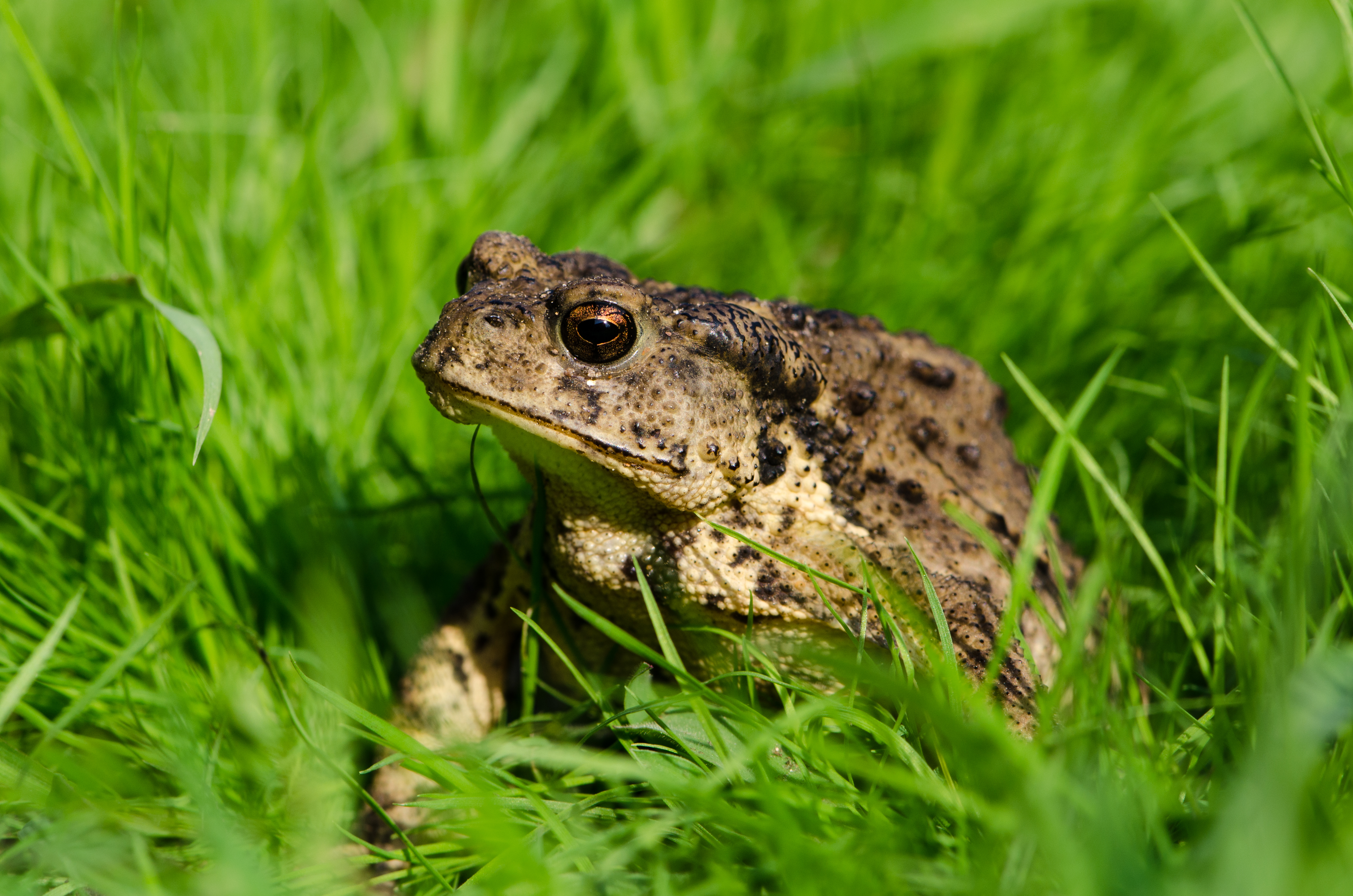
Asiatic toad in a garden in Liaoning Province, China.

=== True toads (Bufo) ===
- Ailao toad
- Asiatic toad
- Bufo cryptotympanicus
- Bufo pageoti
- Bufo tuberculatus
- Bufo wolongensis: only in Wolong Nature Reserve, Sichuan
- Korean water toad
- Pseudepidalea pewzowi

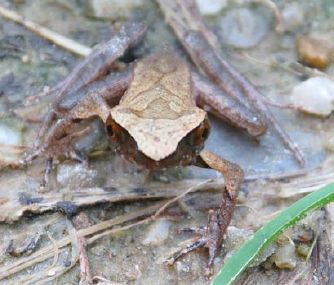
Little horned toad

=== Horned toads (Xenophrys) ===
- Convex-tailed horned toad
- Convex-vented horned toad
- Great piebald horned toad
- Jingdong horned toad
- Kuatun horned toad
- Mangshan horned toad
- Medog horned toad
- Mount Dawei horned toad
- Nankiang horned toad
- Boettger's horned toad
- Glandular horned toad
- Omei horned toad
- Xenophrys daweimontis: only in Daweishan Nature Reserve, Liuyang, Hunan
- Spiny-fingered horned toad
- Wuliangshan horned toad
- Wushan horned toad
- Zhang's horned toad

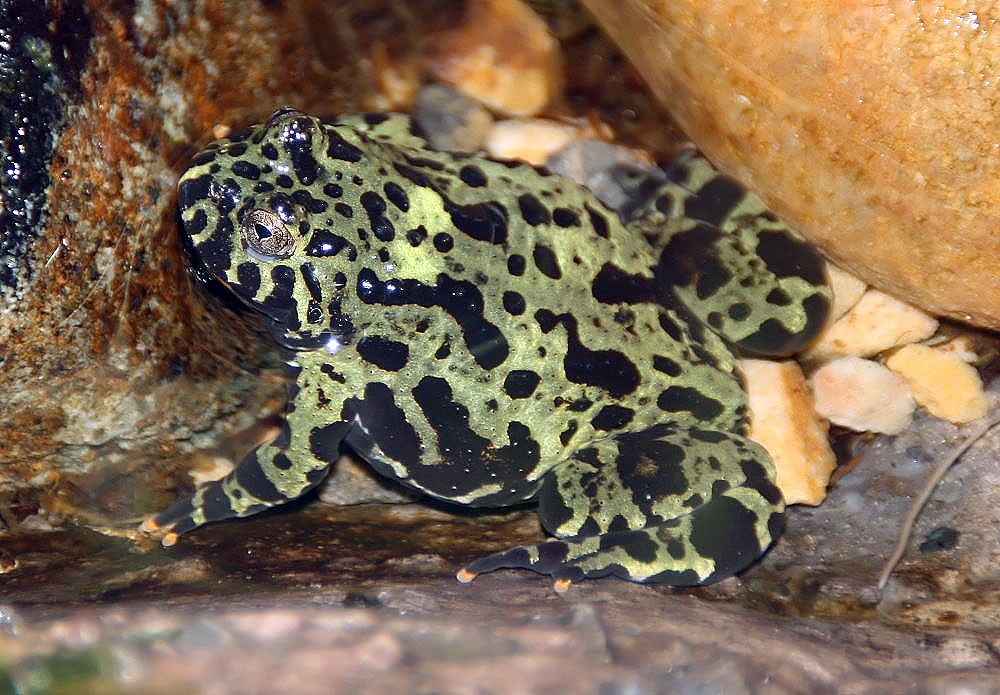
Oriental fire-bellied toad

=== Other toads ===
- Mongolian toad
- Bombina maxima
- Duttaphrynus himalayanus
- Duttaphrynus melanostictus
- Leptobrachium ailaonicum
- Leptobrachium boringii
- Leptobrachium hainanense
- Leptobrachium leishanense
- Leptobrachium liui
- Little horned toad
- Ophryophryne microstoma
- Ophryophryne pachyproctus
- Oriental fire-bellied toad
- Rough-skinned horned toad
- Shaping horned toad
- Spiny-fingered horned toad

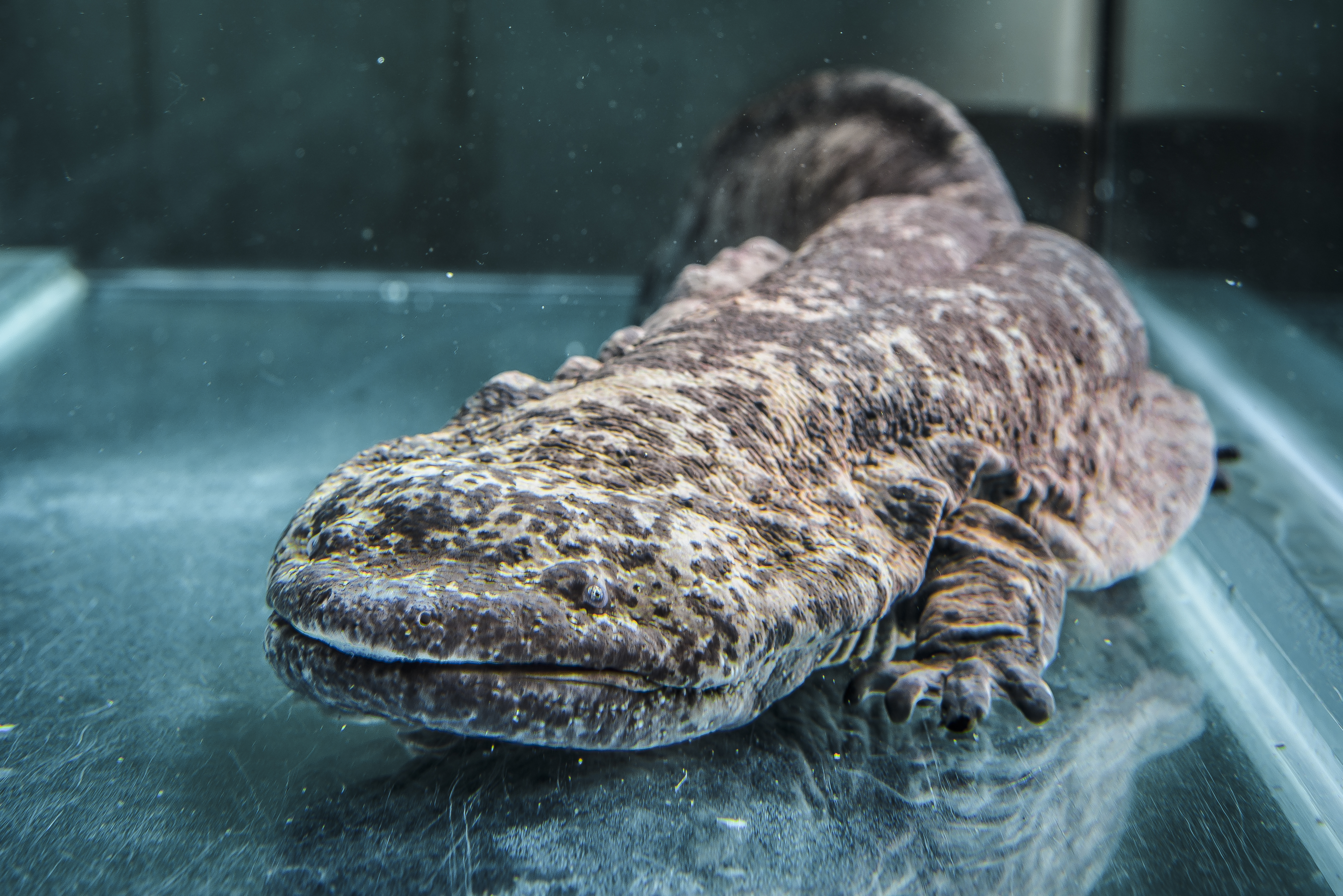
Chinese giant salamander

== Salamanders and newts ==
- Amji's salamander
- Black knobby newt
- Central Asian salamander
- Chenggong fire belly newt
- Chiala mountain salamander
- Chinese giant salamander (Andrias davidianus)
- Chinese fire belly newt
- Chinese warty newt
- Chinhai spiny newt
- Chuxiong fire-bellied newt
- Siberian salamander
- Cynops wolterstorffi: only in Kunming City, Yunnan
- Dayang newt
- Fischer's clawed salamander
- Fuding fire belly newt
- Guabang Shan salamander
- Guangxi warty newt
- Guizhou salamander
- Hainan knobby newt
- Hong Kong warty newt
- Jinfo Mountain salamander
- Korean salamander
- Kuankuoshui salamander
- Pachyhynobius shangchengensis
- Paramesotriton labiatus
- Paramesotriton maolanensis
- Paramesotriton yunwuensis
- Puxiong salamander
- Shuicheng salamander
- Siberian salamander
- Spot-tailed warty newt
- Spotted paddle-tail newt
- Taliang knobby newt
- Wanggao warty newt
- Wenxian knobby newt
- Western Chinese mountain salamander
- Xingan salamander
- Yellow-spotted salamander
- Yiwu salamander
- Yunnan lake newt
- Zhijin warty newt

== Caecilians ==
- Banna caecilian (Ichthyophis bannanicus)
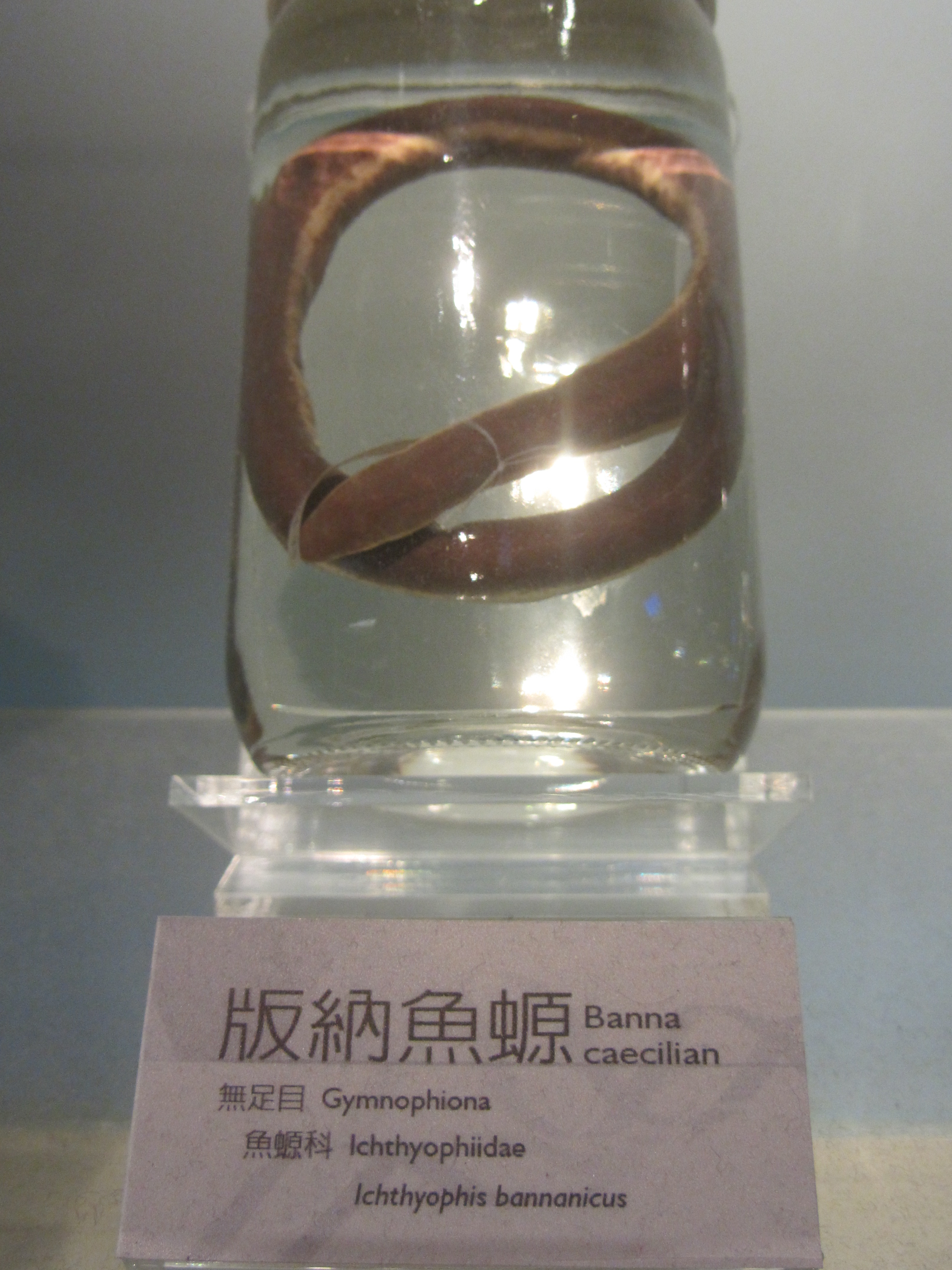
  Ichthyophis bannanicus
