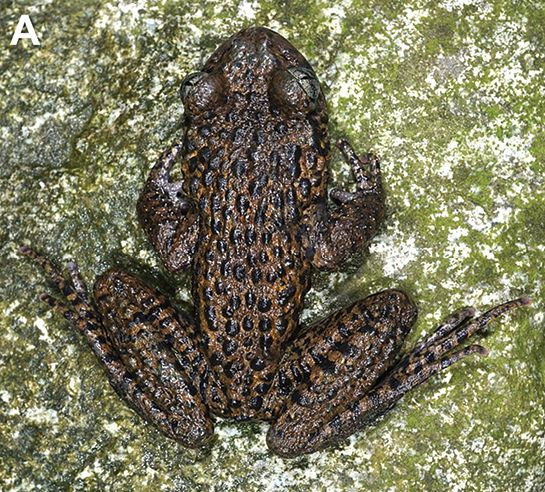
- Oreolalax longmenmontis

Scientific classification
- Kingdom: Animalia
- Phylum: Chordata
- Class: Amphibia
- Order: Anura
- Family: Megophryidae
- Genus: Oreolalax; Myers and Leviton, 1962

Type species
- Scutiger pingii Liu, 1943

Species
- 21 species (see text)

Synonyms
- Atympanolalax Fei and Ye, 2016 – coined as a subgenus of Oreolalax

= Oreolalax =

Genus of frogs

Oreolalax, commonly known as tooth toads, is a genus of frogs that belongs to the family Megophryidae. Most species are endemic to China with some species being found in Vietnam and possibly Laos.

== Species ==
The genus contains the following species:

1. Oreolalax adelphos Nguyen, Tapley, Kane, Tran, Cui & Rowley, 2024
2. Oreolalax chuanbeiensis Tian, 1983
3. Oreolalax granulosus Fei, Ye & Chen, 1990
4. Oreolalax jingdongensis Ma, Yang & Li, 1983
5. Oreolalax liangbeiensis Liu & Fei, 1979
6. Oreolalax lichuanensis Hu & Fei, 1979
7. Oreolalax longmenmontis Hou, Shi, Hu, Deng, Jiang, Xie & Wang, 2020
8. Oreolalax major (Liu & Hu, 1960)
9. Oreolalax multipunctatus Wu, Zhao, Inger & Shaffer, 1993
10. Oreolalax nanjiangensis Fei & Ye, 1999
11. Oreolalax omeimontis (Liu & Hu, 1960)
12. Oreolalax pingii (Liu, 1943)
13. Oreolalax popei (Liu, 1947)
14. Oreolalax puxiongensis Liu & Fei, 1979
15. Oreolalax rhodostigmatus Hu & Fei, 1979
16. Oreolalax rugosus (Liu, 1943)
17. Oreolalax schmidti (Liu, 1947)
18. Oreolalax sterlingae Nguyen, Phung, Le, Ziegler & Böhme, 2013
19. Oreolalax wumengmontis X. Li et al. 2026
20. Oreolalax weigoldi (Vogt, 1924)
21. Oreolalax xiangchengensis Fei & Huang, 1983

== Endemic ranges ==
Most member species are endemic to southwestern China, with at least two species in northern Vietnam (O. sterlingae and O. adelphos) and some possibly extending into adjacent Laos. There is also a population in Arunachal Pradesh (Northeast India) that has not yet been assigned to a species, although it may rather be assigned to the genus Scutiger.

Many Oreolalax species are endemic to highly restricted geographical areas in the Eastern Himalayas, especially in Sichuan, China. The ranges often overlap with those of Scutiger species.

- Yunnan, China
  - Oreolalax granulosus: Ailao Mountains, Jingdong County, Yunnan
  - Oreolalax jingdongensis: Ailao Mountains, Jingdong County, Yunnan
- Sichuan, China
  - Oreolalax nanjiangensis: Mount Guangwu (光雾山), Nanjiang County, Sichuan
  - Oreolalax chuanbeiensis: Pingwu County and Mao County, Sichuan
  - Oreolalax liangbeiensis: Puxiong (普雄镇), Yuexi County, Sichuan
  - Oreolalax longmenmontis: Pengzhou, Sichuan
  - Oreolalax puxiongensis: Puxiong (普雄镇), Yuexi County, Sichuan
  - Oreolalax pingii: Zhaojue County and Yuexi County, Sichuan
  - Oreolalax multipunctatus: Emeishan and Hongya counties, Sichuan
  - Oreolalax omeimontis: Emeishan and Hongya counties, Sichuan
  - Oreolalax major: central Sichuan
  - Oreolalax schmidti: central Sichuan
  - Oreolalax weigoldi: Washan, Sichuan
