= Jingdong =

Jingdong may refer to:

- Jingdong Yi Autonomous County, an autonomous county in Yunnan, China
- Jingdong, Jiangxi, a town in Nanchang, Jiangxi, China
- Jingdong Subdistrict, Deyang, Sichuan, China
- JD.com, also known as Jingdong Mall, a Chinese online commerce company
- Jingdong Circuit, a circuit or province during the Song dynasty
- The Chinese name for Kengtung, Myanmar

== Toad species ==
- Jingdong horned toad, a toad species
- Oreolalax jingdongensis, a toad species also known as Jingdong lazy toad or Jingdong toothed toad
- Glandular horned toad, a toad species also known as Jingdong spadefoot toad
