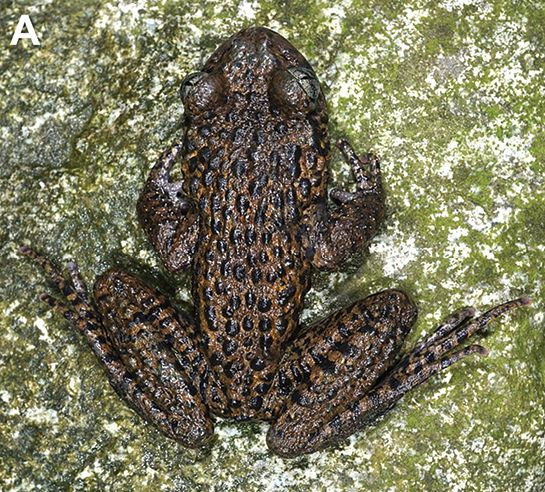
- Dorsal view of the holotype

Scientific classification
- Kingdom: Animalia
- Phylum: Chordata
- Class: Amphibia
- Order: Anura
- Family: Megophryidae
- Genus: Oreolalax
- Species: O. longmenmontis

Binomial name
- Oreolalax longmenmontis Hou, Shi, Hu, Deng, Jiang, Xie, and Wang, 2020

= Oreolalax longmenmontis =

Species of frog

Oreolalax longmenmontis is a species of frog in the family Megophryidae. It is endemic to Sichuan, China, and is only known from its type locality in the White River National Nature Reserve, Pengzhou City. The type locality is in the central part of the Longmen Mountains. Accordingly, common name Longmen Mountains toothed toad has been proposed for this species.

== Etymology ==
The specific name longmenmontis refers to the type locality, Longmen Mountains.

== Distribution ==
Oreolalax longmenmontis is currently only known from its type locality in Pengzhou City. Prior to its description, it was confused with Oreolalax popei, and it is possible that Oreolalax popei from other localities in nearby areas actually represent this species.

== Description ==
The type series consists of three adult males that measure between 51 and 64 mm (2.0 and 2.5 in) in snout–vent length; adult females are unknown. The body is relatively slender and flat. The head is wider than it is long. The snout is rounded. The eyes are relatively large. The tympanum is hidden, while the supratympanic fold is well-developed. The forelimbs are moderately long and strong. The fingers are slender and free of webbing, but fingers III and IV have distinct longitudinal ridges. The hindlimbs are flat. The toes have rudimentary webbing and narrow dermal fringes as well as distinct dermal ridges. Both finger and toe tips are rounded. Dorsal skin is rough and bears tubercles while the belly and the throat are smooth. Dorsal coloration is brown with black tubercles. The iris is bicolored: slightly beige above and silver below, and with black reticulations throughout.

== Habitat and conservation ==
This species is currently known from its type locality where it occurs in subtropical evergreen broad-leaved forest at elevations of 1,300–1,450 m (4,270–4,760 ft) above sea level. It is frequently found near ponds in montane streams. It is sympatric with three other frog species: Amolops chunganensis, Odorrana margaretae, and Quasipaa boulengeri.

Despite many surveys during different seasons, only few adults have been found, and the adult population appears to be very small. However, the tadpoles were more numerous. Threats to this species include disturbances from tourism, habitat loss associated with intensifying human activities, and increasingly severe weather events. As of late 2020, this species had not yet been assessed for the IUCN Red List of Threatened Species.
