= Nanjiang (disambiguation) =

Nanjiang County (南江县) is a county in Sichuan province.

Nanjiang may also refer to:

- Nanjiang, Pingjiang (南江镇), a town in Pingjiang County, Hunan province, China
- Southern Xinjiang or Nanjiang (南疆), a region of China
