= Nankiang horned toad =

Conservation status
- Vulnerable (IUCN 3.1)

Scientific classification
- Kingdom: Animalia
- Phylum: Chordata
- Class: Amphibia
- Order: Anura
- Family: Megophryidae
- Genus: Atympanophrys
- Species: A. nankiangensis

Binomial name
- Atympanophrys nankiangensis (Liu & Hu, 1966)

Synonyms
- Megophrys nankiangensis Liu & Hu, 1966; Xenophrys nankiangensis (Liu & Hu, 1966)

Species of frog

The Nankiang horned toad (Atympanophrys nankiangensis) is a species of frog in the family Megophryidae. It is endemic to northern Sichuan and southern Gansu, China.

== Range ==
It is found in:

- Mount Guangwu, Nanjiang County, northern Sichuan (where Oreolalax nanjiangensis is also found)
- Qingchuan County, northern Sichuan
- Wen County, Gansu

== Habitat ==
Its natural habitats are temperate shrubland and rivers. It inhabits hill streams and surrounding shrubland habitat. It probably breeds in streams like other species of the genus. This species is known from Kuang-wu Shan in Nankiang County and Qingchuan in Sichuan Province, and Wenxian, in Gansu Province, China, from 1,600-1,850m above sea level.

It is threatened by habitat loss. The major threat to this species is habitat destruction and degradation, especially due to infrastructure development for touristic activities. This species is listed as vulnerable because its Extent of Occurrence is less than 20,000 square kilometers, it is known from fewer than ten locations, and there is continuing decline in the extent and quality of its habitat in Sichuan and Gansu, China.
