= Jingfu =

Jingfu (景福) may refer to:

== Towns in China ==
- Jingfu, Sichuan, in Santai County, Sichuan
- Jingfu, Yunnan, in Jingdong Yi Autonomous County, Yunnan

== Historical eras ==
- Jingfu (892–893), era name used by Emperor Zhaozong of Tang
- Jingfu (1031–1032), era name used by Emperor Xingzong of Liao
