= YXC =

YXC may refer to:

- Cranbrook/Canadian Rockies International Airport (IATA: YXC), an international airport in Cranbrook, British Columbia
- Yuexi County, Sichuan (Division code: YXC), Sichuan, China
