= Oreolalax weigoldi =

Conservation status
- Data Deficient (IUCN 3.1)

Scientific classification
- Kingdom: Animalia
- Phylum: Chordata
- Class: Amphibia
- Order: Anura
- Family: Megophryidae
- Genus: Oreolalax
- Species: O. weigoldi

Binomial name
- Oreolalax weigoldi (Vogt, 1924)

Synonyms
- Megalophrys weigoldi Vogt, 1924; Megophrys weigoldi (Vogt, 1924); Scutiger weigoldi (Vogt, 1924)

Species of amphibian

Oreolalax weigoldi, also known as Weigold's lazy toad or Weigold's toothed toad, is a species of amphibian in the family Megophryidae. It is endemic to Sichuan, China. It is only known from its type locality, Washan in southern Sichuan; there are, however, many places with this name in Sichuan. It might be the same species as Oreolalax major (Liu and Hu, 1960).

== Description ==
The single male specimen (holotype) was 58 mm (2.3 in) in snout-vent length.
