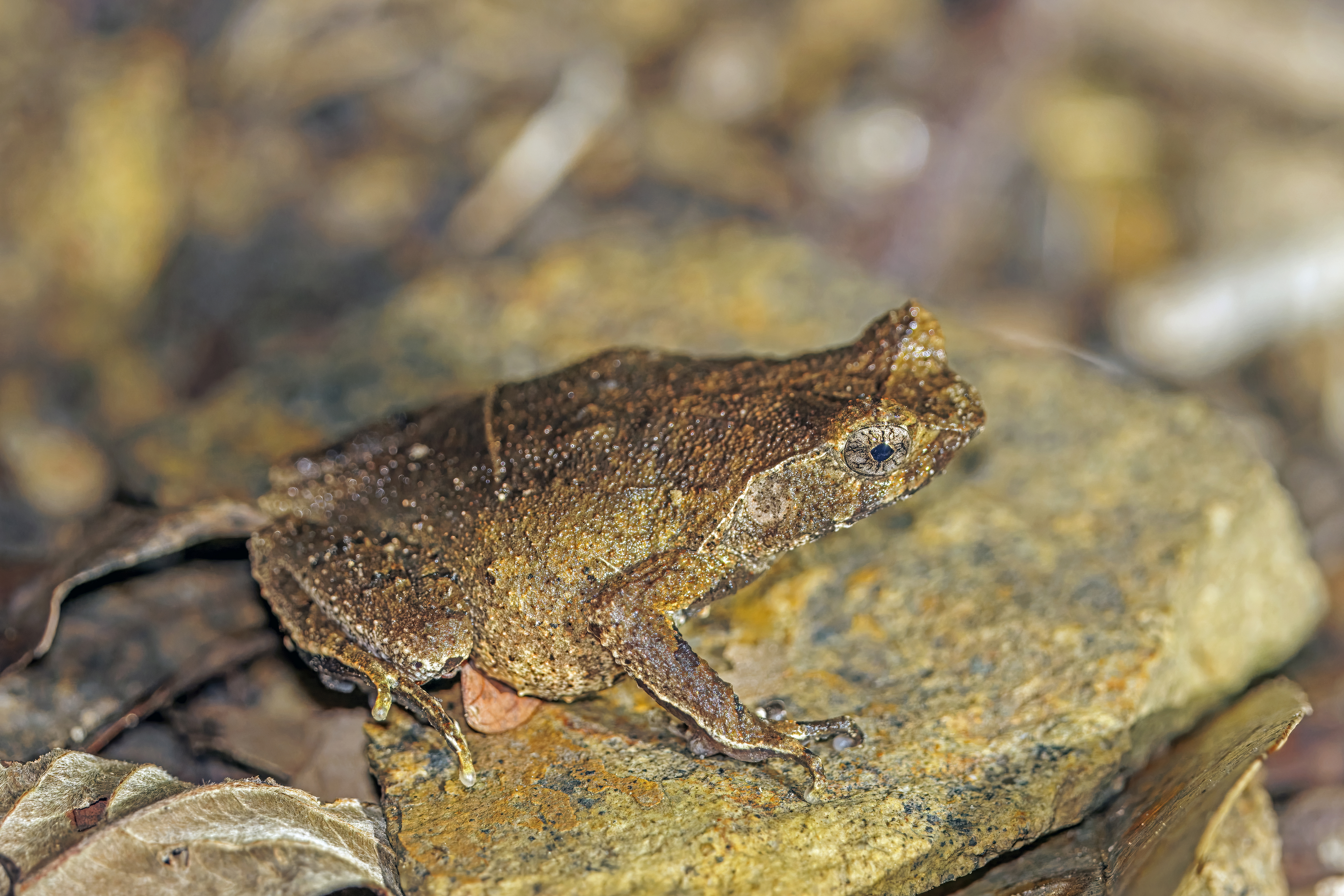

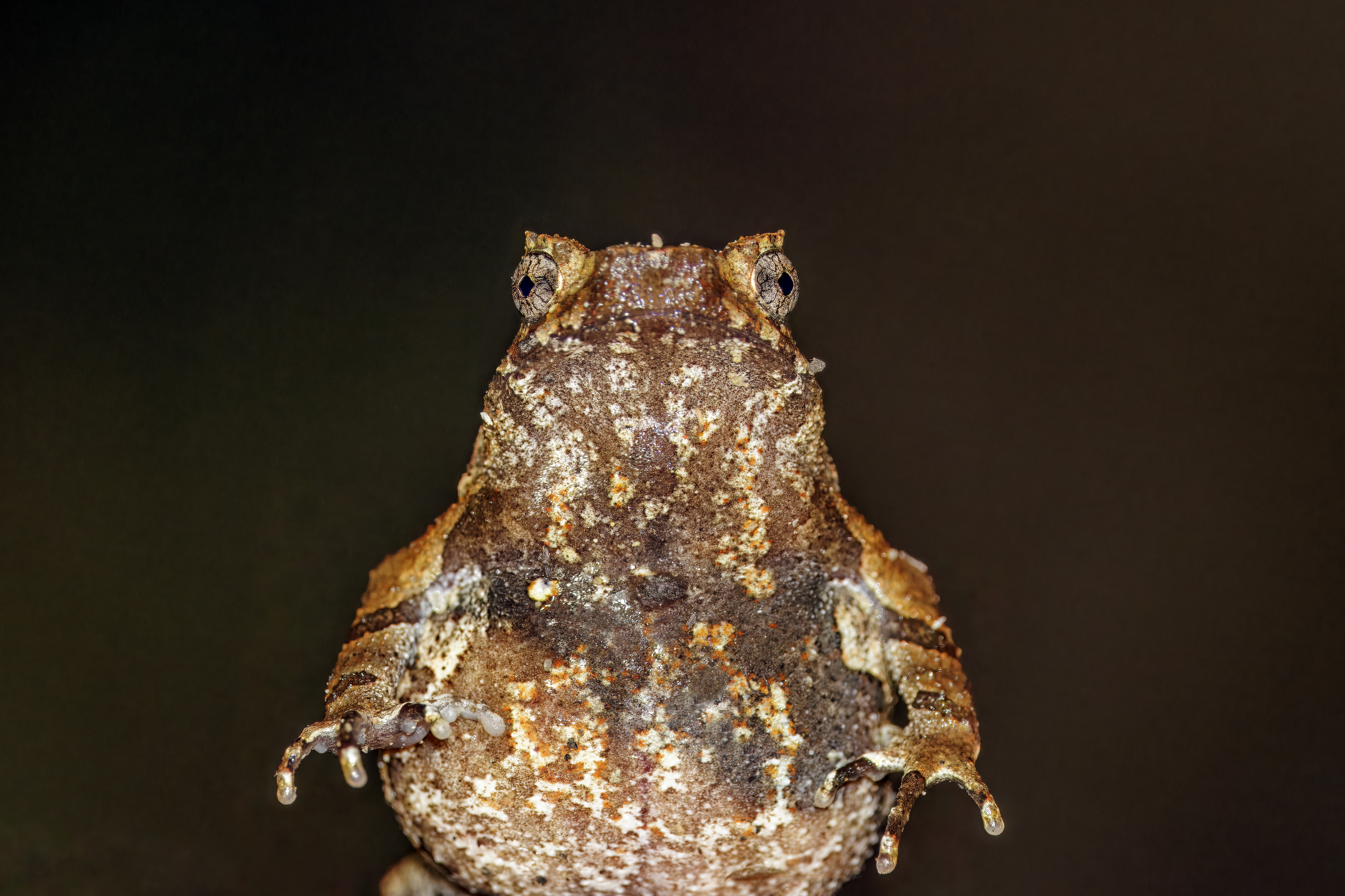
- same toad, Pok Fu Lam Country Park; Hong Kong

Conservation status
- Endangered (IUCN 3.1)

Scientific classification
- Kingdom: Animalia
- Phylum: Chordata
- Class: Amphibia
- Order: Anura
- Family: Megophryidae
- Genus: Boulenophrys
- Species: B. brachykolos

Binomial name
- Boulenophrys brachykolos (Inger and Romer, 1961)

Synonyms
- Xenophrys brachykolos (Inger and Romer, 1961); Megophrys minor brachykolos; Megophrys brachykolos (Inger and Romer, 1961)

= Boulenophrys brachykolos =

Species of amphibian

Boulenophrys brachykolos, the short-legged horned toad or Peak spadefoot toad, is a frog native to southern China and Vietnam. It was first discovered in the Victoria Peak (locally known as The Peak), Hong Kong. Many populations of Hong Kong are in the country parks, such as Lung Fu Shan Country Park.

== Taxonomy and distribution ==
Whether Boulenophrys brachykolos is a valid species or only subspecies of Megophrys minor has been questioned, but molecular genetic evidence now supports its species status. Recent research has also shown that the species has a wider distribution than assumed before. At the time of the IUCN assessment in 2004, the species was hardly known outside Hong Kong and it was considered to be an endangered species. Reflecting the distribution now known to be much wider, the conservation status of Boulenophrys brachykolos is likely to change when the assessment is updated.

== Description ==
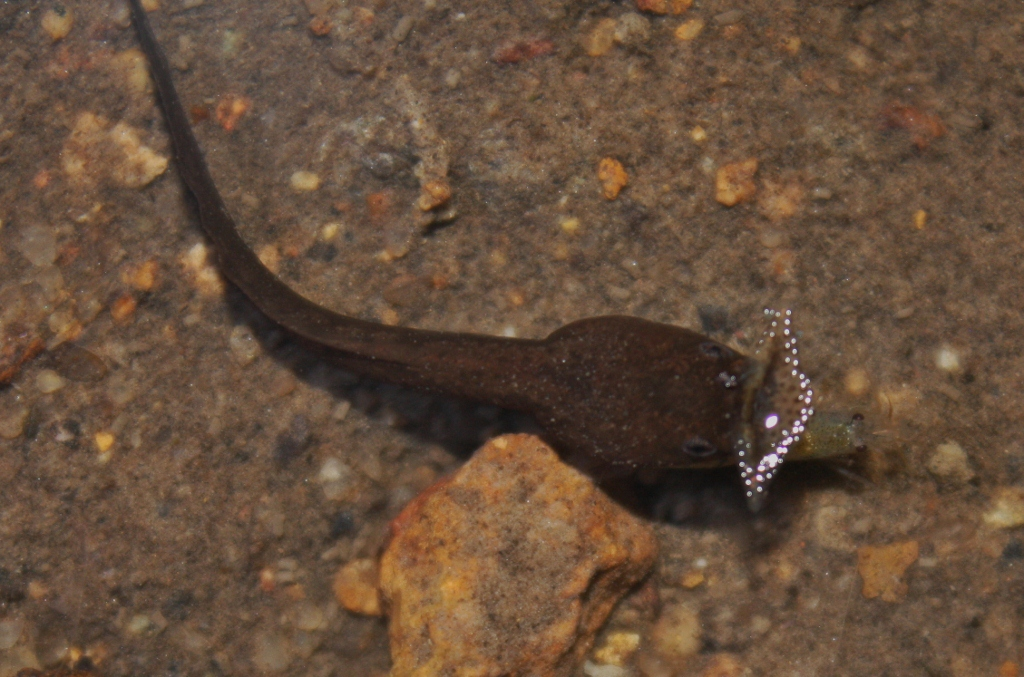
Tadpole of Boulenophrys brachykolos

Boulenophrys brachykolos are relatively small but robust frogs. Males have a snout-vent length of 34–40 mm (1.3–1.6 in) and females 40–48 mm (1.6–1.9 in). They have a strongly projecting snout and a small horn-like tubercle at the edge of the upper eyelid (the "horn" of a "horned toad").
