= Oreolalax multipunctatus =

Conservation status
- Endangered (IUCN 3.1)

Scientific classification
- Kingdom: Animalia
- Phylum: Chordata
- Class: Amphibia
- Order: Anura
- Family: Megophryidae
- Genus: Oreolalax
- Species: O. multipunctatus

Binomial name
- Oreolalax multipunctatus Wu, Zhao, Inger & Shaffer, 1993

Species of amphibian

Oreolalax multipunctatus (dotted lazy toad or spotted toothed toad) is a species of amphibian in the family Megophryidae. It is endemic to the Mount Emei region in Emeishan and Hongya counties of Sichuan, China. Its natural habitats are subtropical moist montane forests and rivers. It is threatened by habitat loss.

Male Oreolalax multipunctatus grow to about 48 mm (1.9 in) in snout-vent length. Tadpoles are 65 mm (2.6 in) in length.
