= Oreolalax omeimontis =

Conservation status
- Endangered (IUCN 3.1)

Scientific classification
- Kingdom: Animalia
- Phylum: Chordata
- Class: Amphibia
- Order: Anura
- Family: Megophryidae
- Genus: Oreolalax
- Species: O. omeimontis

Binomial name
- Oreolalax omeimontis (Liu and Hu, 1960)

Synonyms
- Scutiger omeimontis Liu and Hu, 1960

Species of amphibian

Oreolalax omeimontis (Omei lazy toad or Omei toothed toad) is a species of amphibian in the family Megophryidae. It is endemic to Sichuan, China where it is found in Mount Emei (its type locality) and in Hongya County. Its natural habitats are subtropical moist montane forests and rivers. It is threatened by habitat loss.

Male Oreolalax omeimontis grow to about 54 mm (2.1 in) in snout-vent length and females to 61 mm (2.4 in). Tadpoles are 64 mm (2.5 in) in length.
