= Oreolalax puxiongensis =

Conservation status
- Endangered (IUCN 3.1)

Scientific classification
- Kingdom: Animalia
- Phylum: Chordata
- Class: Amphibia
- Order: Anura
- Family: Megophryidae
- Genus: Oreolalax
- Species: O. puxiongensis

Binomial name
- Oreolalax puxiongensis Liu & Fei, 1979

Synonyms
- Scutiger puxiongensis (Liu & Fei, 1979)

Species of amphibian

Oreolalax puxiongensis (Puxiong toothed toad) is a species of amphibian in the family Megophryidae. It is endemic to China where it is only known from two locations in Yuexi County, Sichuan, including Puxiong (普雄镇), its type locality. It inhabits marshes, pools, small streams and the surrounding subtropical forest. It is threatened by habitat loss.

Oreolalax puxiongensis is the smallest among the Oreolalax: males grow to about 43 mm (1.7 in) in snout-vent length and females to about 47 mm (1.9 in). Tadpoles are 50 mm (2.0 in) in length.

== See also ==
- Puxiong salamander
