= Oreolalax schmidti =

Conservation status
- Near Threatened (IUCN 3.1)

Scientific classification
- Kingdom: Animalia
- Phylum: Chordata
- Class: Amphibia
- Order: Anura
- Family: Megophryidae
- Genus: Oreolalax
- Species: O. schmidti

Binomial name
- Oreolalax schmidti (Liu, 1947)

Synonyms
- Scutiger schmidti Liu, 1947

Species of amphibian

Oreolalax schmidti (Schmidt's lazy toad or webless toothed toad) is a species of amphibian in the family Megophryidae. It is endemic to China where it can be found in the Hengduan Mountains in western Sichuan and northern Yunnan provinces. Its natural habitats are temperate forests, subtropical moist shrubland, rivers, swamps, and freshwater marshes. It is threatened by habitat loss. It is named after Karl Patterson Schmidt, American herpetologist.

Male Oreolalax schmidti grow to about 43 mm (1.7 in) in snout-vent length and females to about 51 mm (2.0 in). Tadpoles are 53 mm (2.1 in) in length.
