= Puxiong salamander =

Conservation status
- Critically Endangered (IUCN 3.1)

Scientific classification
- Kingdom: Animalia
- Phylum: Chordata
- Class: Amphibia
- Order: Urodela
- Family: Hynobiidae
- Genus: Pseudohynobius
- Species: P. puxiongensis

Binomial name
- Pseudohynobius puxiongensis (Fei & Ye, 2000)

Synonyms
- Protohynobius puxiongensis Fei & Ye, 2000

Species of amphibian

The Puxiong salamander (Pseudohynobius puxiongensis) is a species of salamander in the family Hynobiidae, endemic to China. It is only known from the vicinity of its type locality, in Puxiong (普雄镇), in Yuexi County, Sichuan Province. The area belongs to the Hengduan Mountains that form the southeastern part of the Qinghai-Tibet Plateau. The Puxiong salamander is a relatively small salamander with a slender body form.

== History of discovery and taxonomic position ==
The Puxiong salamander was first described in 2000 as Protohynobius puxiongensis, based on a single specimen collected in 1965. Because of a characteristic interpreted as primitive (internasal bone), a new monotypic genus, Protohynobius, in its own subfamily, Protohynobiinae, was established. However, field effort in 2007–2009 revealed new animals that allowed a more detailed analysis. These suggested the holotype from 1965 was slightly unusual, as later specimens did not have an internasal bone while being in other respects very similar to the holotype. Furthermore, the Puxiong salamander is morphologically similar to Pseudohynobius species, and genetic analyses place it as a sister group of Pseudohynobius. Because the genetic distance to Pseudohynobius was small, it was concluded that Puxiong salamander should be placed in genus Pseudohynobius. This position is adopted in the "Amphibian Species of the World".

== Habitat ==
The holotype was collected from an abandoned potato cellar, but later field work revealed a more typical habitat for a hynobiid, i.e., high-mountain terrestrial (altitude 2,900 m), with breeding in cold-water streams.
