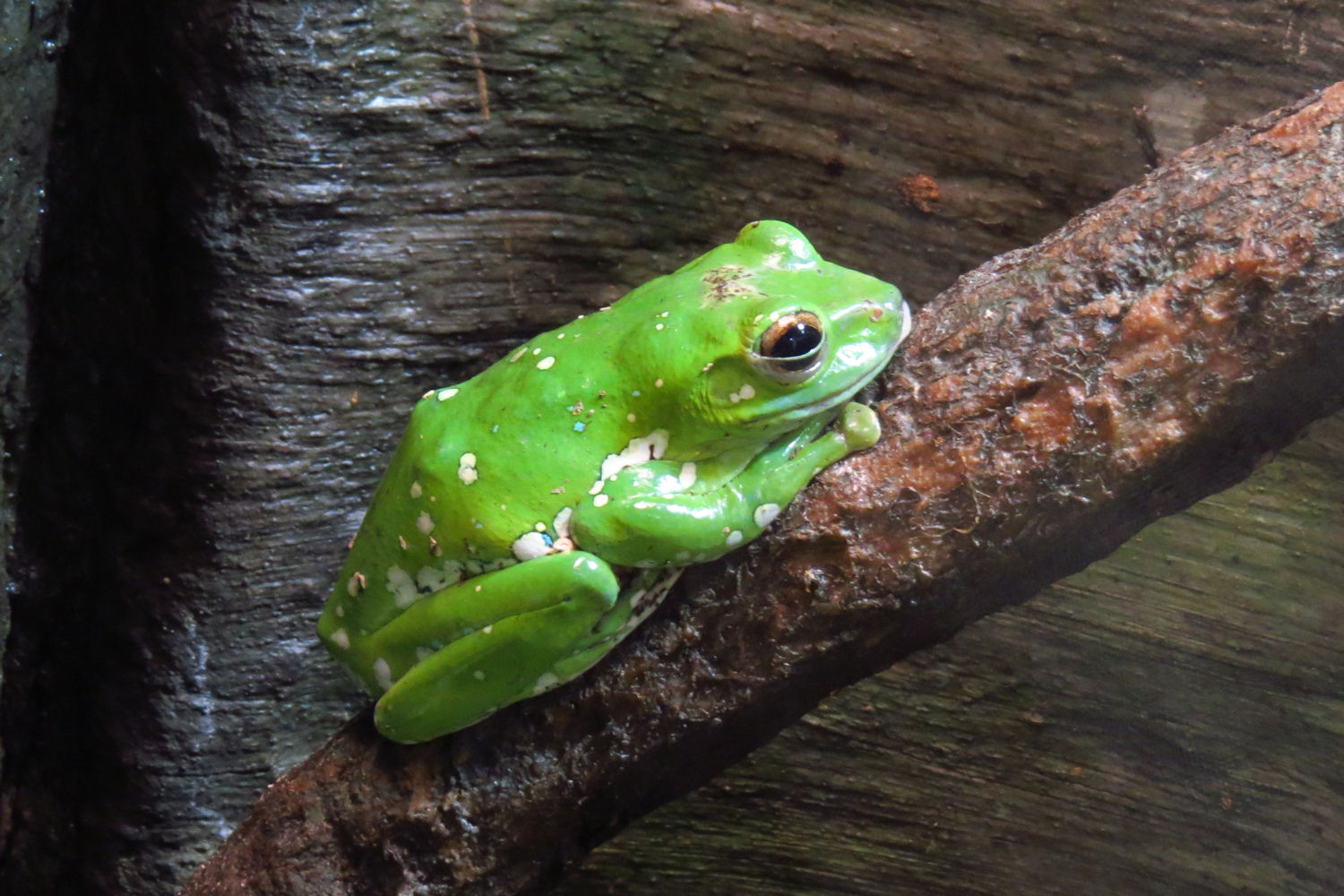

Conservation status
- Least Concern (IUCN 3.1)

Scientific classification
- Kingdom: Animalia
- Phylum: Chordata
- Class: Amphibia
- Order: Anura
- Family: Rhacophoridae
- Genus: Zhangixalus
- Species: Z. dennysi

Binomial name
- Zhangixalus dennysi (Blanford, 1881)

Synonyms
- Polypedates dennysi (Blanford, 1881); Rhacophorus dennysi Blanford, 1881

= Chinese flying frog =

Species of amphibian

The Chinese flying frog or Chinese gliding frog (Zhangixalus dennysi) is a species of tree frog in the family Rhacophoridae found in China, Laos, Myanmar, and Vietnam. It is also known as Blanford's whipping frog, large treefrog, and Denny's whipping frog.

== Description ==
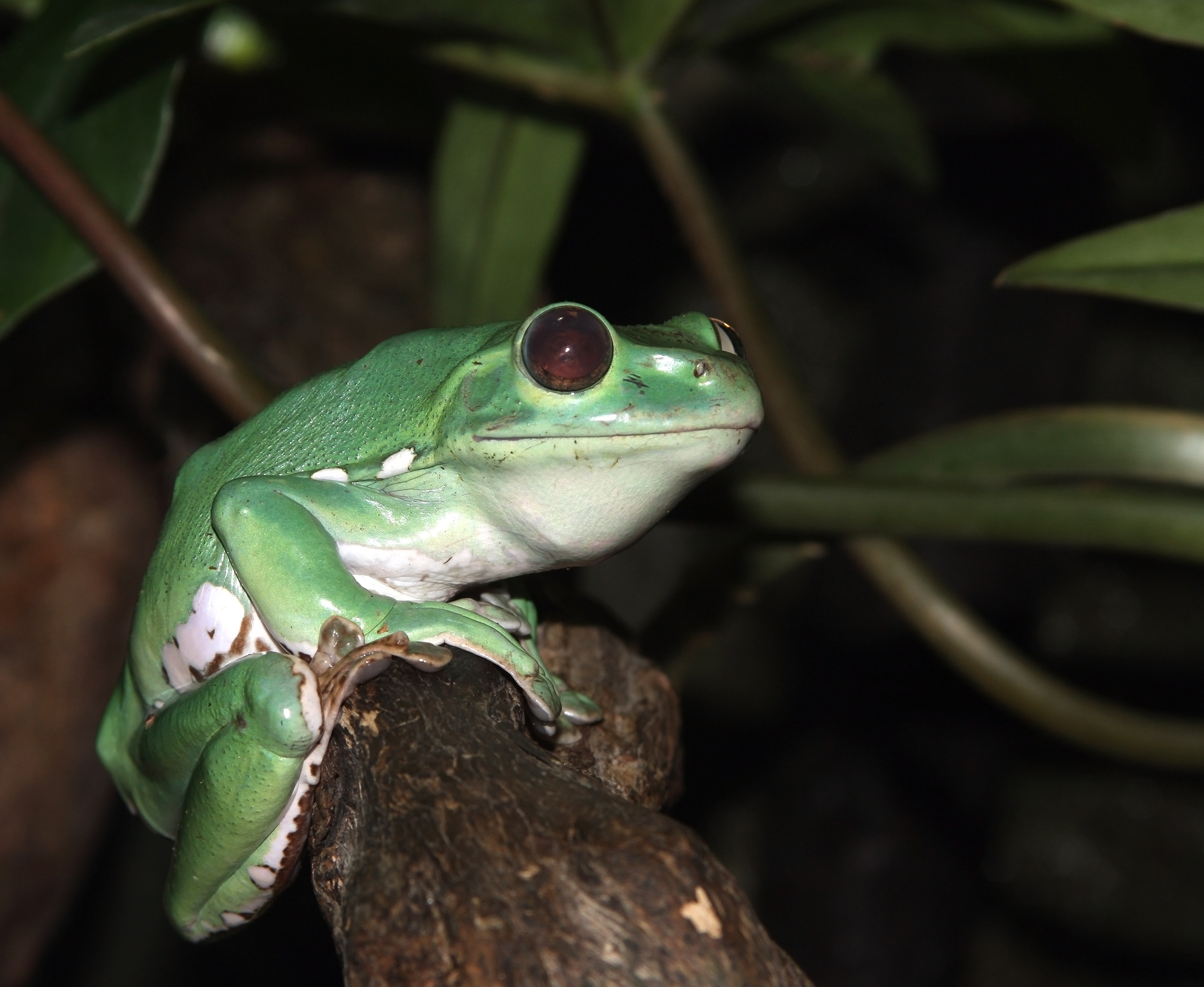
Adult exhibited at Museum of Discovery and Science (Fort Lauderdale, Florida, US)

It is up to 10 cm (3.9 in) long and has an unusually loud call. This frog has adhesive disks on its toes for climbing and sticking to trees and branches. It also has large amounts of webbed skin between its toes. When it jumps from a branch, the skin stretches, allowing the frog to glide between branches or between trees. The frog can move its feet mid-air to steer.

== Habitat ==
This frog lives in moist forests in lowlands, mountains, and on hills near streams. This frog tends to live in primary forest. It has been observed between 80 and 1500 meters above sea level. This frog feeds on insects.

== Life cycle ==
Females lay eggs in foam nests attached to branches and grasses hanging over water. They create nests by beating a frothy secretion into foam with their hind legs. The tadpoles develop in paddy fields, holes full of water, ponds, and marshes.

== Threats ==
The IUCN classifies this species as least concern of extinction. What danger exists comes from habitat loss: People go into the forest to take things they need. People change the forest into small farms. Pollution, wildfires, and changes in hydrology can also harm this frog. In some places, people catch this frog to eat or sell as part of the international pet trade.

The frog's range includes protected parks.

== Etymology ==
The name of the genus honors Zhang Ya-Ping from the Chinese Academy of Sciences, in recognition to his contributions to biodiversity and evolution research in China, in combination with ixalus, a common generic root for tree frogs.
