= Oreolalax xiangchengensis =

Conservation status
- Least Concern (IUCN 3.1)

Scientific classification
- Kingdom: Animalia
- Phylum: Chordata
- Class: Amphibia
- Order: Anura
- Family: Megophryidae
- Genus: Oreolalax
- Species: O. xiangchengensis

Binomial name
- Oreolalax xiangchengensis Fei and Huang, 1983

Synonyms
- Scutiger xiangchengensis (Fei and Huang, 1983)

Species of amphibian

Oreolalax xiangchengensis (Xiangcheng lazy toad or Xiangcheng toothed toad) is a species of amphibian in the family Megophryidae. It is endemic to China where it can be found in western Sichuan and in the Hengduan Mountains in northern Yunnan. Its range includes Baimaxueshan, Habaxueshan, Panzhihua-Sutie, and Yading Nature Reserves.

Its natural habitats are temperate forests, rivers, and freshwater springs. It is threatened by habitat loss.

Male Oreolalax xiangchengensis grow to about 49 mm (1.9 in) in snout-vent length and females to about 57 mm (2.2 in). Tadpoles are 60 mm (2.4 in) in length.
