= Oreolalax pingii =

Conservation status
- Endangered (IUCN 3.1)

Scientific classification
- Kingdom: Animalia
- Phylum: Chordata
- Class: Amphibia
- Order: Anura
- Family: Megophryidae
- Genus: Oreolalax
- Species: O. pingii

Binomial name
- Oreolalax pingii (Liu, 1943)

Synonyms
- Scutiger pingii Liu, 1943

Species of amphibian

Oreolalax pingii (Chinese lazy toad or Ping's toothed toad) is a species of amphibian in the family Megophryidae. It is endemic to south-western China where it is restricted to the Daliang and Hengduan Mountains in Sichuan and Yunnan. Its natural habitats are subtropical moist montane forests, moist shrubland, and rivers. It is threatened by habitat loss.

== Range ==
It is known only from two locations.

- Daliangshan in Zhaojue County, Sichuan
- Daliangshan in Yuexi County, Sichuan

== Morphology ==
Male Oreolalax pingii grow to about 47 mm (1.9 in) in snout-vent length and females to 52 mm (2.0 in). Tadpoles are 64 mm (2.5 in) in length
