= Wuliangshan horned toad =

Conservation status
- Near Threatened (IUCN 3.1)

Scientific classification
- Kingdom: Animalia
- Phylum: Chordata
- Class: Amphibia
- Order: Anura
- Family: Megophryidae
- Genus: Boulenophrys
- Species: B. wuliangshanensis

Binomial name
- Boulenophrys wuliangshanensis (Ye and Fei, 1995)

Synonyms
- Megophrys wuliangshanensis Ye and Fei, 1995; Xenophrys wuliangshanensis (Ye and Fei, 1995)

Species of frog

Boulenophrys wuliangshanensis, commonly known as the Wuliangshan horned toad, is a species of frog found in eastern Asia. It has been found in Yunnan province in China and the state of Nagaland in India and it is thought to occur in Myanmar (Burma), although there are no records from there as yet. Its specific name refers to its type location, Mount Wuliang in Jingdong County.

The Wuliangshan horned toad is a small species; females reach body length of about 41 mm (1.6 in). It is a rare species. Currently its IUCN Red List classification is Data Deficient.
