= Spiny-fingered horned toad =

Conservation status
- Least Concern (IUCN 3.1)

Scientific classification
- Kingdom: Animalia
- Phylum: Chordata
- Class: Amphibia
- Order: Anura
- Family: Megophryidae
- Genus: Boulenophrys
- Species: B. spinata

Binomial name
- Boulenophrys spinata (Liu and Hu, 1973)

Synonyms
- Xenophrys spinata (Liu and Hu, 1973); Megophrys spinata

Species of frog

The spiny-fingered horned toad (Boulenophrys spinata) or spiny spadefoot toad, is a species of frog in the family Megophryidae. It is endemic to China and known from Sichuan, Yunnan, Guizhou, and Guangxi provinces. Its natural habitats are subtropical or tropical moist lowland forests, subtropical or tropical moist montane forests, and rivers. It is threatened by habitat loss.

Males measure 50 mm (2.0 in) and females 55 mm (2.2 in) in length.
