= Oreolalax nanjiangensis =

Conservation status
- Vulnerable (IUCN 3.1)

Scientific classification
- Kingdom: Animalia
- Phylum: Chordata
- Class: Amphibia
- Order: Anura
- Family: Megophryidae
- Genus: Oreolalax
- Species: O. nanjiangensis

Binomial name
- Oreolalax nanjiangensis Fei & Ye, 1999

Species of amphibian

Oreolalax nanjiangensis (Nanjiang toothed toad) is a species of amphibian in the family Megophryidae. It is endemic to China. It is known from the area of the type locality of Mount Guangwu (光雾山), Nanjiang County, northern Sichuan, as well as adjacent southern Gansu and southwestern Shaanxi. Its natural habitats are temperate forests and rivers. It is threatened by habitat loss associated with tourism.

Male Oreolalax nanjiangensis grow to about 57 mm (2.2 in) in snout-vent length. Tadpoles are 74 mm (2.9 in) in length.
