= Raorchestes longchuanensis =

Conservation status
- Least Concern (IUCN 3.1)

Scientific classification
- Domain: Eukaryota
- Kingdom: Animalia
- Phylum: Chordata
- Class: Amphibia
- Order: Anura
- Family: Rhacophoridae
- Genus: Raorchestes
- Species: R. longchuanensis

Binomial name
- Raorchestes longchuanensis Yang & Li, 1978

Synonyms
- Philautus longchuanensis

Species of amphibian

Raorchestes longchuanensis (Longchuan bubble-nest frog or Longchuan small treefrog) is a species of frog in the family Rhacophoridae. It is found in the Gaoligong and Hengduan Mountains in Yunnan, China (including the eponymous Longchuan) and in adjacent northern Vietnam (Lai Châu Province), and possibly in Myanmar.

Raorchestes longchuanensis is a small species; males measure 20 mm (0.79 in) in snout–vent length. It inhabits shrubland in river valleys. It is common but easily overlooked due to its small size. It is potentially threatened by habitat loss.

This frog has been observed between 1350 and 1500 meters above sea level in river valleys. The adult frogs hide behind leaves, but people have seen them in bushes or next to roads. Some frogs will live near human houses. Scientists do not know whether this frog breeds through direct or larval development.

This frog is not classified as in danger of extinction, but humans can disturb its habitat through farming and wood collection.
