= Oreolalax rugosus =

Conservation status
- Least Concern (IUCN 3.1)

Scientific classification
- Kingdom: Animalia
- Phylum: Chordata
- Class: Amphibia
- Order: Anura
- Family: Megophryidae
- Genus: Oreolalax
- Species: O. rugosus

Binomial name
- Oreolalax rugosus (Liu, 1943)

Synonyms
- Scutiger rugosus Liu, 1943

Species of amphibian

Oreolalax rugosus (Chaochiao lazy toad or warty toothed toad) is a species of amphibian in the family Megophryidae. It is endemic to China where it can be found in the Hengduan Mountains in southern Sichuan and northern Yunnan provinces. Its natural habitats are subtropical moist montane forests and rivers. It is threatened by habitat loss.

Male Oreolalax rugosus grow to about 47 mm (1.9 in) in snout-vent length and females to about 50 mm (2.0 in). Tadpoles are 67 mm (2.6 in) in length.
