= Oreolalax lichuanensis =

Conservation status
- Least Concern (IUCN 3.1)

Scientific classification
- Kingdom: Animalia
- Phylum: Chordata
- Class: Amphibia
- Order: Anura
- Family: Megophryidae
- Genus: Oreolalax
- Species: O. lichuanensis

Binomial name
- Oreolalax lichuanensis Hu & Fei, 1979

Synonyms
- Scutiger lichuanensis

Species of amphibian

Oreolalax lichuanensis (Lichuan lazy toad or Lichuan toothed toad) is a species of amphibian in the family Megophryidae. It is endemic to China, and found in south-central parts of the country (Hubei, Sichuan, Chongqing, and Guizhou). Its natural habitats are subtropical or tropical moist montane forests, subtropical or tropical moist shrubland, and rivers. It is threatened by habitat loss.

Male Oreolalax lichuanensis grow to about 51 mm (2.0 in) in snout-vent length and females to about 59 mm (2.3 in). Tadpoles are 72 mm (2.8 in) in length.
