= Leptobrachella alpina =

Conservation status
- Near Threatened (IUCN 3.1)

Scientific classification
- Kingdom: Animalia
- Phylum: Chordata
- Class: Amphibia
- Order: Anura
- Family: Megophryidae
- Genus: Leptobrachella
- Species: L. alpina

Binomial name
- Leptobrachella alpina (Fei, Ye, and Li, 1990)

Synonyms
- Leptolalax alpinus Fei, Ye and Li, 1990; Paramegophrys alpinus (Fei, Ye and Li, 1990)

Species of amphibian

Leptobrachella alpina is a frog species in the family Megophryidae. It is endemic to Jingdong County in Yunnan, China, where it occurs in Wuliangshan National Nature Reserve; there is also a questionable record from Tianling in Guangxi.

Leptobrachella alpina is a very rare species inhabiting broadleaf forests at 2,400 m (7,900 ft) above sea level. Breeding takes place in streams. It is threatened by habitat loss and degradation, primarily caused by small-scale subsistence wood extraction. Although occurring in the Wuliangshan Reserve, better management outside its core area is needed.
