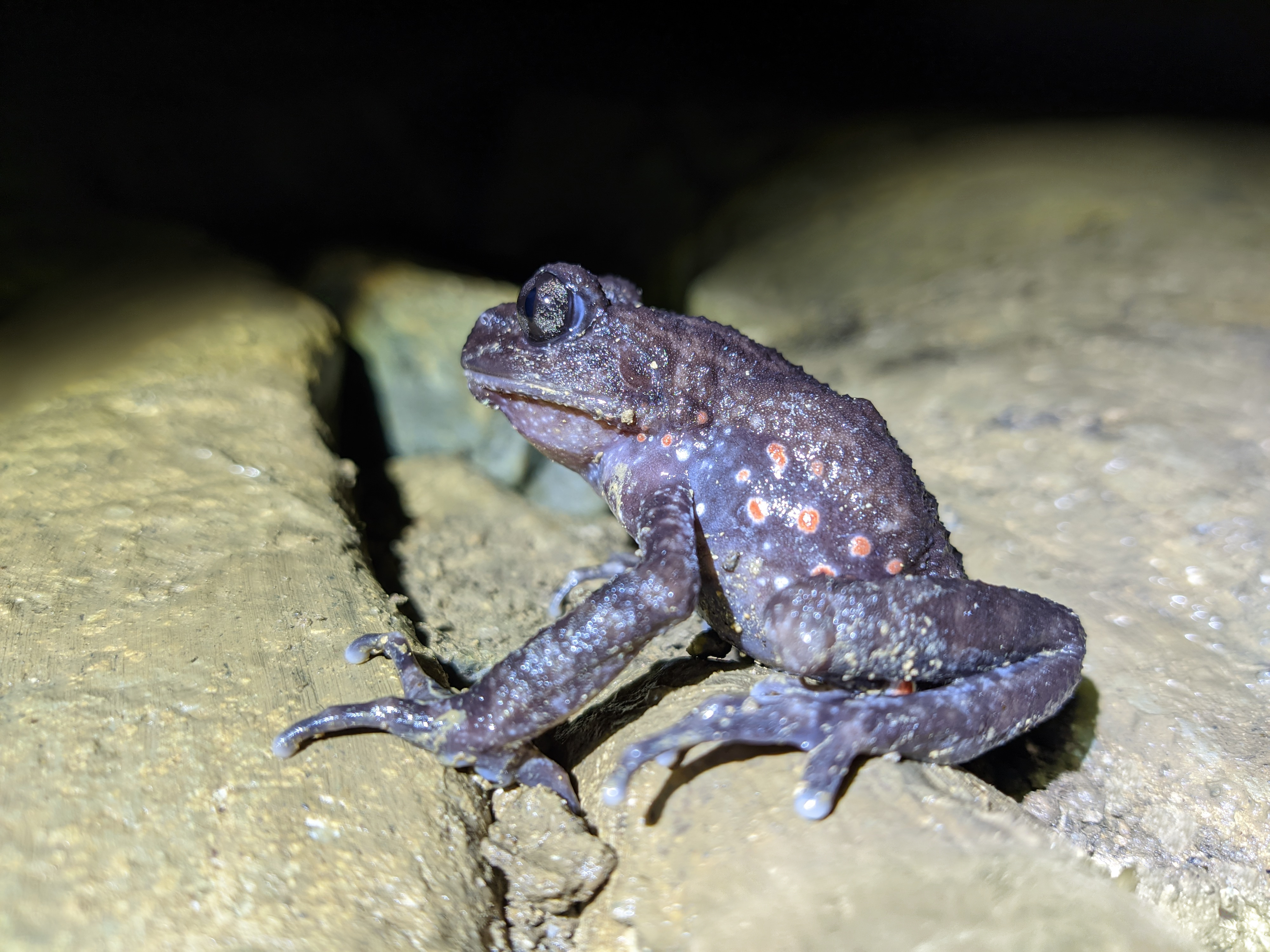

Conservation status
- Vulnerable (IUCN 3.1)

Scientific classification
- Kingdom: Animalia
- Phylum: Chordata
- Class: Amphibia
- Order: Anura
- Family: Megophryidae
- Genus: Oreolalax
- Species: O. rhodostigmatus

Binomial name
- Oreolalax rhodostigmatus Hu and Fei, 1979

Synonyms
- Scutiger rhodostigmatus (Hu and Fei, 1979)

= Oreolalax rhodostigmatus =

Species of amphibian

Oreolalax rhodostigmatus (Guizhou lazy toad or red-spotted toothed toad) is a species of amphibian in the family Megophryidae. It is endemic to central and south-central China where it can be found in Hubei, Sichuan, Guizhou, and Hunan provinces. While its distribution is relatively wide, it is known from only few locations. Its natural habitats are limestone caves in forested habitats. Breeding takes place in springs and stream pools inside the limestone caves. It is threatened by habitat loss and locally by collection for food (tadpoles).

Oreolalax rhodostigmatus is among the largest of the Oreolalax: males grow to about 68 mm (2.7 in) in snout-vent length and females to about 67 mm (2.6 in). Tadpoles are particularly large, 104 mm (4.1 in) in length.
