= Jingfu, Yunnan =

Jingfu 景福镇
- Town
- Location in Yunnan
- Coordinates: 24°20′33″N 100°37′4″E
- Country: People's Republic of China
- Province: Yunnan
- Prefecture-level city: Pu'er City
- Autonomous county: Jingdong Yi Autonomous County
- Time zone: UTC+8 (China Standard)

Jingfu (Chinese: 景福; pinyin: Jǐngfú) is a town under the administration of Jingdong Yi Autonomous County in Yunnan, China. As of 2020, it has 13 villages under its administration:

- Guli Village (古里村)
- Tangliqing Village (棠梨箐村)
- Gongping Village (公平村)
- Zhuqing Village (竹箐村)
- Jinjilin Village (金鸡林村)
- Zhaoqishan Village (赵其山村)
- Lujia Village (鲁家村)
- Longshan Village (龙山村)
- Huisi Village (回寺村)
- Mengpian Village (勐片村)
- Chahe Village (岔河村)
- Mengling Village (勐令村)
- Hushan Village (虎山村)
