= Oreolalax liangbeiensis =

Conservation status
- Critically Endangered (IUCN 3.1)

Scientific classification
- Kingdom: Animalia
- Phylum: Chordata
- Class: Amphibia
- Order: Anura
- Family: Megophryidae
- Genus: Oreolalax
- Species: O. liangbeiensis

Binomial name
- Oreolalax liangbeiensis Liu & Fei, 1979

Synonyms
- Scutiger liangbeiensis (Liu & Fei, 1979)

Species of amphibian

Oreolalax liangbeiensis (Liangbei toothed toad) is a species of amphibian in the family Megophryidae endemic to China: it is only known from the vicinity of its type locality, Puxiong (普雄镇) in Yuexi County, Sichuan, where it is known only from a single stream. Its natural habitats are subtropical moist montane forests and rivers. It is threatened by habitat loss.

Male Oreolalax liangbeiensis grow to about 52 mm (2.0 in) in snout-vent length and females to about 60 mm (2.4 in). Tadpoles are 61 mm (2.4 in) in length.
