= Jingdong Yi Autonomous County =

Jingdong County 景东县 · ᥛᥫᥒᥰ ᥖᥧᥒᥴ
- Autonomous county
- 景东彝族自治县; Jingdong Yi Autonomous County
- Location of Jingdong County (red) and Pu'er City (pink) within Yunnan province

- Location of the seat in Yunnan
- Coordinates: 24°26′49″N 100°50′02″E
- Country: China
- Province: Yunnan
- Prefecture-level city: Pu'er
- GB/T 2260 CODE: 530821
- County seat: Jinping

Area
  - Total: 4,532 km^{2} (1,750 sq mi)
- Elevation: 1,872 m (6,142 ft)

Population (2020 census)
  - Total: 303,109
  - Density: 66.88/km^{2} (173.2/sq mi)
- Time zone: UTC+8 (China Standard Time)
- Postal code: 676200
- Area code: 0879
- Website: www.jingdong.gov.cn
- ^{1}Yunnan Statistics Bureau^{2}Puer Gov.^{3}Yunnan Portal

Jingdong Yi Autonomous County (simplified Chinese: 景东彝族自治县; traditional Chinese: 景東彝族自治縣; pinyin: Jǐngdōng Yízú Zìzhìxiàn; Tai Nüa: ᥛᥫᥒᥰ ᥖᥧᥒᥴ) is an autonomous county in southern Yunnan Province, China. It is the northernmost county-level division of the prefecture-level city of Pu'er. Jingdong borders Nanhua County, Chuxiong City and Shuangbai County to the east, Zhenyuan County to the south, Linxiang District and Yun County to the west, and Nanjian County and Midu County to the north.

== Administrative divisions ==
In the present, Jingdong Yi Autonomous County has 10 towns and 3 townships.

10 towns

- Jinping (锦屏镇)
- Wenjing (文井镇)
- Manwan (漫湾镇)
- Dachaoshandong (大朝山东镇)
- Huashan (花山镇)
- Dajie (大街镇)
- Taizhong (太忠镇)
- Wenlong (文龙镇)
- Anding (安定镇)
- Jingfu (景福镇)

3 townships

- Mandeng (曼等乡)
- Longjie (龙街乡)
- Linjie (林街乡)

== Ethnic groups ==
The Hani of Jingdong (autonym: Kaduo 卡多) numbered 10,861 individuals as of 1990 and live primarily in Wenjing 文井, Zhehou 者后, and Huashan 花山 townships.

The Jingdong County Ethnic Gazetteer 景东县民族志 (2012:209) reports that are about 200 ethnic Bulang in Manbeng Village 曼崩村, Dachaoshandong Town 大朝山东镇.

According to the Jingdong County Gazetteer (1994:519), ethnic Yao numbered 3,889 individuals in 1990, and lived mainly in Chaqing 岔箐 and Dasongshu 大松树 of Taizhong 太忠乡. Yao language speakers, known as the Lewu Yao 乐舞瑶族, were found in Puya Village 普牙村, Chaqing Township 岔箐乡 (Jingdong County Ethnic Gazetteer 2012:144). The Jingdong County Ethnic Gazetteer (2012) reports that the Lewu language is now extinct.

== Fauna ==
Frog species in Jingdong County include:

Family Megophryidae

- Oreolalax granulosus (endemic to the Ailao Mountains)
- Oreolalax jingdongensis (endemic to the Ailao Mountains)
- Leptolalax alpinus (endemic)
- Xenophrys wuliangshanensis (type locality)
- Xenophrys glandulosa (type locality)
- Xenophrys jingdongensis (type locality)
- Xenophrys gigantica
- Leptobrachium ailaonicum (type locality)

Family Ranidae

- Nanorana bourreti
- Odorrana jingdongensis (type locality)

== Climate ==
Climate data for Jingdong, elevation 1,162 m (3,812 ft), (1991–2020 normals, extremes 1981–present)
Month	Jan	Feb	Mar	Apr	May	Jun	Jul	Aug	Sep	Oct	Nov	Dec	Year
Record high °C (°F)	28.9 (84.0)	30.6 (87.1)	34.4 (93.9)	35.4 (95.7)	39.1 (102.4)	37.3 (99.1)	34.7 (94.5)	34.7 (94.5)	34.7 (94.5)	32.4 (90.3)	30.8 (87.4)	27.6 (81.7)	39.1 (102.4)
Mean daily maximum °C (°F)	21.6 (70.9)	24.4 (75.9)	27.4 (81.3)	29.5 (85.1)	30.1 (86.2)	29.8 (85.6)	29.0 (84.2)	29.6 (85.3)	28.3 (82.9)	26.0 (78.8)	23.6 (74.5)	21.1 (70.0)	26.7 (80.1)
Daily mean °C (°F)	11.8 (53.2)	14.1 (57.4)	17.6 (63.7)	20.6 (69.1)	22.9 (73.2)	24.2 (75.6)	23.8 (74.8)	23.6 (74.5)	22.4 (72.3)	19.9 (67.8)	15.7 (60.3)	12.5 (54.5)	19.1 (66.4)
Mean daily minimum °C (°F)	5.9 (42.6)	7.3 (45.1)	10.5 (50.9)	13.9 (57.0)	17.6 (63.7)	20.6 (69.1)	20.8 (69.4)	20.4 (68.7)	19.3 (66.7)	16.7 (62.1)	11.5 (52.7)	7.7 (45.9)	14.4 (57.8)
Record low °C (°F)	−0.3 (31.5)	0.6 (33.1)	1.8 (35.2)	7.2 (45.0)	10.0 (50.0)	14.5 (58.1)	15.9 (60.6)	15.1 (59.2)	10.6 (51.1)	7.4 (45.3)	3.4 (38.1)	−1.4 (29.5)	−1.4 (29.5)
Average precipitation mm (inches)	26.3 (1.04)	17.8 (0.70)	22.5 (0.89)	37.4 (1.47)	99.5 (3.92)	154.4 (6.08)	210.6 (8.29)	219.3 (8.63)	138.5 (5.45)	122.1 (4.81)	39.7 (1.56)	13.4 (0.53)	1,101.5 (43.37)
Average precipitation days (≥ 0.1 mm)	5.0	4.8	6.3	8.6	13.3	18.4	22.6	20.8	18.1	16.0	6.9	4.3	145.1
Average relative humidity (%)	76	67	61	61	68	77	82	81	82	83	82	81	75
Mean monthly sunshine hours	197.9	208.8	228.7	222.6	201.0	138.0	117.9	145.6	138.8	132.0	158.5	167.4	2,057.2
Percentage possible sunshine	59	65	61	58	49	34	28	37	38	37	49	51	47
Source: China Meteorological Administration all-time extreme temperatureall-time November record high
