= Amolops loloensis =

Conservation status
- Vulnerable (IUCN 3.1)

Scientific classification
- Kingdom: Animalia
- Phylum: Chordata
- Class: Amphibia
- Order: Anura
- Family: Ranidae
- Genus: Amolops
- Species: A. loloensis

Binomial name
- Amolops loloensis (Liu, 1950)

Synonyms
- Staurois loloensis Liu, 1950; Amolops liangshanensis (Wu & Zhao, 1984); Staurois liangshanensis Wu and Zhao, 1984

Species of frog

Amolops loloensis is a species of frog in the family Ranidae that is found in southern and western Sichuan and one locality in north-central Yunnan, China. Its natural habitats are small mountain streams in forests and grasslands. It is threatened by infrastructure development for human settlement, potentially also by water pollution from the mining industry. T

Male Amolops loloensis grow to a snout–vent length of 58 mm (2.3 in) and females to 74 mm (2.9 in). Tadpoles are up to 22 mm (0.87 in) in length.
