= Oreolalax granulosus =

Conservation status
- Near Threatened (IUCN 3.1)

Scientific classification
- Kingdom: Animalia
- Phylum: Chordata
- Class: Amphibia
- Order: Anura
- Family: Megophryidae
- Genus: Oreolalax
- Species: O. granulosus

Binomial name
- Oreolalax granulosus Fei, Ye & Chen, 1990

Species of amphibian

Oreolalax granulosus is a species of amphibian in the family Megophryidae. Being restricted to the vicinity of its type locality in Jingdong County in southern Yunnan, where it occurs in Ailaoshan National Nature Reserve. It is endemic to China. Its natural habitats are subtropical moist montane forests and rivers. It is threatened by habitat loss.

Male Oreolalax granulosus grow to about 55 mm (2.2 in) in snout-vent length and females to about 59 mm (2.3 in). Tadpoles are 62 mm (2.4 in) in length.
