= Oreolalax chuanbeiensis =

Conservation status
- Endangered (IUCN 3.1)

Scientific classification
- Kingdom: Animalia
- Phylum: Chordata
- Class: Amphibia
- Order: Anura
- Family: Megophryidae
- Genus: Oreolalax
- Species: O. chuanbeiensis

Binomial name
- Oreolalax chuanbeiensis Tian, 1983

Synonyms
- Scutiger chuanbeiensis (Tian, 1983)

Species of amphibian

Oreolalax chuanbeiensis (Sichuan lazy toad or Chuanbei toothed toad) is a species of amphibian in the family Megophryidae. It is endemic to northern Sichuan, China where it is found in Pingwu County and Mao County. Its natural habitats are temperate forests and rivers. It is threatened by habitat loss.

Male Oreolalax chuanbeiensis grow to about 53 mm (2.1 in) in snout-vent length and females to about 58 mm (2.3 in). Tadpoles are 65 mm (2.6 in) in length.
