= Oreolalax jingdongensis =

Conservation status
- Vulnerable (IUCN 3.1)

Scientific classification
- Kingdom: Animalia
- Phylum: Chordata
- Class: Amphibia
- Order: Anura
- Family: Megophryidae
- Genus: Oreolalax
- Species: O. jingdongensis

Binomial name
- Oreolalax jingdongensis Ma, Yang, and Li, 1983

Synonyms
- Scutiger jingdongensis (Ma, Yang, and Li, 1983)

Species of amphibian

Oreolalax jingdongensis (Jingdong lazy toad or Jingdong toothed toad) is a species of amphibian in the family Megophryidae. It is endemic to China: it is only found in the Ailao Mountains region in Yunnan, including the Jingdong County that has given it its name. Its natural habitats are subtropical or tropical moist montane forests and rivers. It is threatened by habitat loss.

Male Oreolalax jingdongensis grow to about 50 mm (2.0 in) in snout-vent length and females to about 49 mm (1.9 in). Tadpoles are 80 mm (3.1 in) in length.
