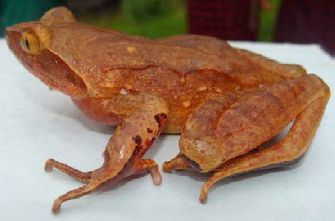
- In Trashiyangtse District, Bhutan

Conservation status
- Least Concern (IUCN 3.1)

Scientific classification
- Kingdom: Animalia
- Phylum: Chordata
- Class: Amphibia
- Order: Anura
- Family: Megophryidae
- Genus: Xenophrys
- Species: X. glandulosa

Binomial name
- Xenophrys glandulosa (Fei, Ye, and Huang, 1990)

Synonyms
- Megophrys glandulosa Fei, Ye, and Huang, 1990

= Megophrys glandulosa =

Species of amphibian

Xenophrys glandulosa, the glandular horned toad or Jingdong spadefoot toad is a species of amphibian in the family Megophryidae found in Yunnan in China, in Nagaland in northeastern India, and in northern Kachin State, Myanmar. It has recently been reported from Bhutan. Its type locality is Mount Wuliang in Jingdong County, Yunnan. Its natural habitats are tropical moist montane forests and rivers.
