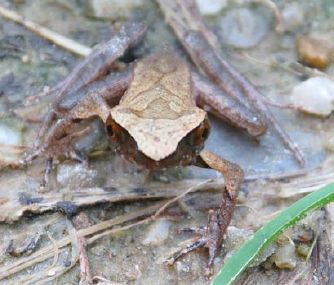
- In Mongar District, Bhutan

Conservation status
- Least Concern (IUCN 3.1)

Scientific classification
- Kingdom: Animalia
- Phylum: Chordata
- Class: Amphibia
- Order: Anura
- Family: Megophryidae
- Genus: Boulenophrys
- Species: B. minor

Binomial name
- Boulenophrys minor (Stejneger, 1926)

Synonyms
- Megophrys minor Stejneger, 1926; Xenophrys minor

= Little horned toad =

Species of frog

The little horned toad (Boulenophrys minor), also known as the dwarf horned toad, Kwangshien spadefoot toad, or tiny spadefoot toad, is a species of frog in the family Megophryidae. It is found in southern China, Thailand, Vietnam, and possibly in Laos and Myanmar. It has recently been reported from Bhutan. Its natural habitats are subtropical or tropical moist lowland forests, subtropical or tropical moist montane forests, rivers, and swamps. It is threatened by habitat loss.
