= Oreolalax popei =

Conservation status
- Least Concern (IUCN 3.1)

Scientific classification
- Kingdom: Animalia
- Phylum: Chordata
- Class: Amphibia
- Order: Anura
- Family: Megophryidae
- Genus: Oreolalax
- Species: O. popei

Binomial name
- Oreolalax popei (Liu, 1947)

Synonyms
- Scutiger popei Liu, 1947

Species of amphibian

Oreolalax popei (Pope's lazy toad or Baoxing toothed toad) is a species of amphibian in the family Megophryidae. It is endemic to China where it is found in southern Gansu, southern Shaanxi, and central and northeastern Sichuan provinces. Its natural habitats are temperate forests, subtropical moist lowland forests, moist montane forests, and rivers. It is threatened by habitat loss.

Male Oreolalax chuanbeiensis grow to about 65 mm (2.6 in) in snout-vent length and females to about 62 mm (2.4 in). Tadpoles are 73 mm (2.9 in) in length.
