= Oreolalax major =

Conservation status
- Least Concern (IUCN 3.1)

Scientific classification
- Kingdom: Animalia
- Phylum: Chordata
- Class: Amphibia
- Order: Anura
- Family: Megophryidae
- Genus: Oreolalax
- Species: O. major

Binomial name
- Oreolalax major (Liu & Hu, 1960)

Synonyms
- Scutiger major Liu and Hu, 1960

Species of amphibian

Oreolalax major (common lazy toad or large toothed toad) is a species of amphibian in the family Megophryidae. It is endemic to China and found in Sichuan and Yunnan provinces, between Mount Emei and Hengduan Mountains. It likely exists in Emeishan, Wawushan, Gonggashan, Wolong, and Dujiangyan National Nature Reserves. Its natural habitats are subtropical moist montane forests and rivers. It is threatened by habitat loss.

Oreolalax major is the largest among Oreolalax: males grow to about 68 mm (2.7 in) in snout-vent length and females to about 70 mm (2.8 in). Tadpoles are 65 mm (2.6 in) in length.
