= Jingdong horned toad =

Conservation status
- Least Concern (IUCN 3.1)

Scientific classification
- Kingdom: Animalia
- Phylum: Chordata
- Class: Amphibia
- Order: Anura
- Family: Megophryidae
- Genus: Boulenophrys
- Species: B. jingdongensis

Binomial name
- Boulenophrys jingdongensis (Fei & Ye, 1983)

Synonyms
- Megophrys omeimontis ssp. jingdongensis Fei & Ye, 1983; Megophrys jingdongensis Fei & Ye, 1983; Xenophrys jingdongensis (Fei & Ye, 1983)

Species of frog

The Jingdong horned toad (Boulenophrys jingdongensis), also known as the Jingdong spadefoot toad, is a species of frog in the family Megophryidae native to China and Vietnam.

== Distribution and habitat ==
The Jingdong horned toad is known from Yunnan province (Jingdong, Luchun, Pingbian, Shuangbai, Wenshan, Xinping, Xishuangbanna, and Yuanyang) and northwestern Guangxi province (Tianlin) in China, and from Hà Giang, Lào Cai, Lai Châu, and Sơn La provinces in northern Vietnam. It is likely also present in Laos. It occurs around rocky streams in subtropical evergreen forests at elevations of 1,000–2,400 m (3,300–7,900 ft).

== Conservation status ==
The Jingdong horned toad is listed as least concern by the International Union for the Conservation of Nature due to its large range, however, it is likely threatened by deforestation. It is known to occur within protected areas in both China (Xiaoqiaogou Nature Reserve and Hiuanglianshan Nature Reserve) and Vietnam (Hoang Lien National Park and Bat Xat Nature Reserve). Further research is needed to determine its full distribution, ecology, and population size.
