= Hongya County =

Hongya County 洪雅县
- County
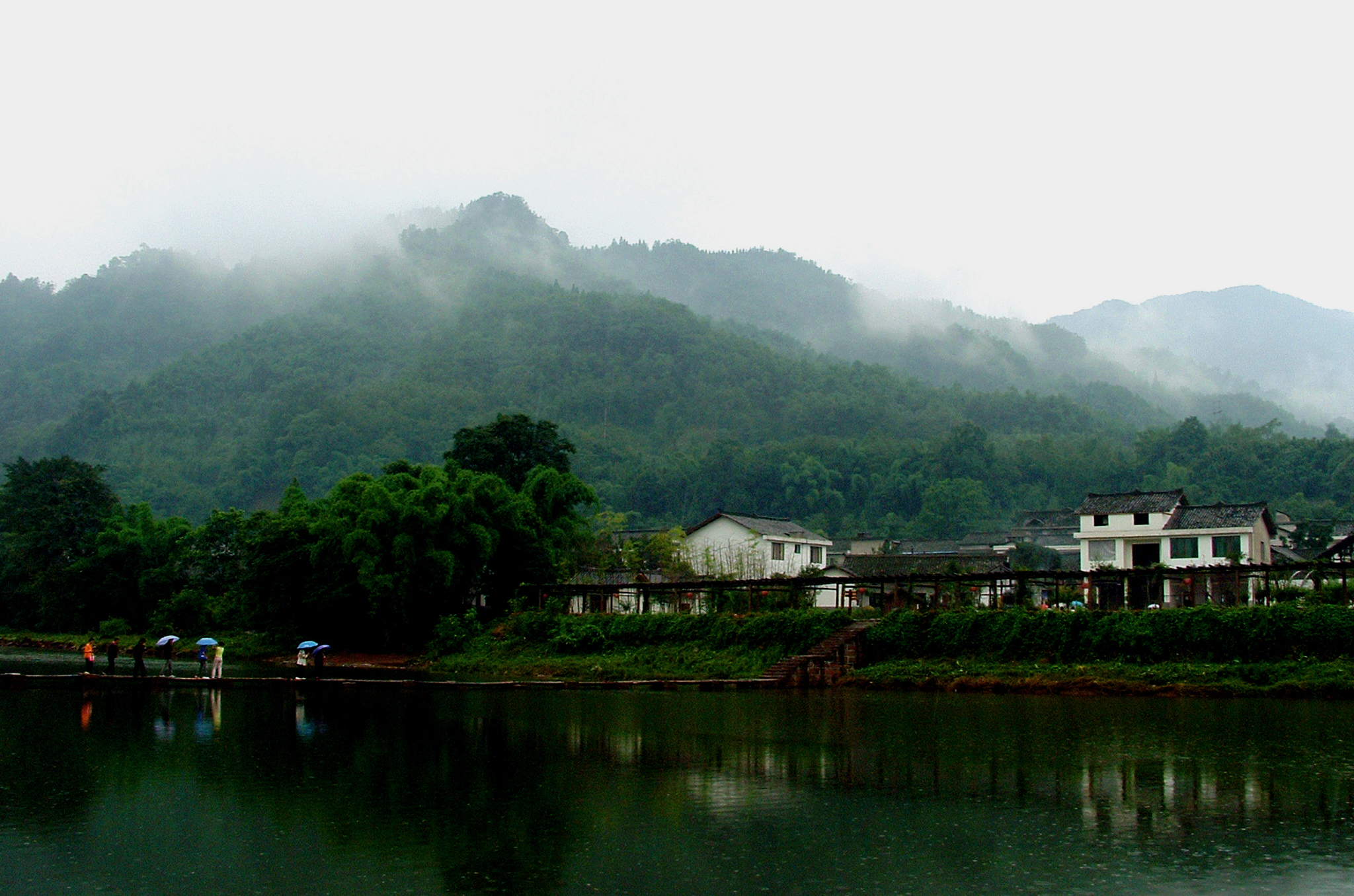

- Location of the seat in Sichuan
- Coordinates: 29°41′46″N 103°10′58″E
- Country: China
- Province: Sichuan
- Prefecture-level city: Meishan

Area
  - Total: 1,896.49 km^{2} (732.24 sq mi)

Population (2020 census)
  - Total: 295,744
  - Density: 155.943/km^{2} (403.890/sq mi)
- Time zone: UTC+8 (China Standard)

Hongya (Chinese: 洪雅; pinyin: Hóngyǎ) is a county of Sichuan Province, China. It is under the administration of Meishan city.

== Administrative divisions ==
Hongya County comprises 12 towns:

- Zhige 止戈镇
- Hongchuan 洪川镇
- Yuping 余坪镇
- Caoyutan 槽渔滩镇
- Zhongbao 中保镇
- Dongyue 东岳镇
- Liujiang 柳江镇
- Gaomiao 高庙镇
- Wawushan 瓦屋山镇
- Qiliping 七里坪镇
- Jiangjun 将军镇
- Zhongshan 中山镇

== Climate ==
Climate data for Hongya, elevation 571 m (1,873 ft), (1991–2020 normals, extremes 1981–present)
Month	Jan	Feb	Mar	Apr	May	Jun	Jul	Aug	Sep	Oct	Nov	Dec	Year
Record high °C (°F)	20.5 (68.9)	24.0 (75.2)	31.7 (89.1)	33.1 (91.6)	35.8 (96.4)	36.8 (98.2)	36.6 (97.9)	37.9 (100.2)	35.6 (96.1)	29.8 (85.6)	26.6 (79.9)	18.9 (66.0)	37.9 (100.2)
Mean daily maximum °C (°F)	9.6 (49.3)	12.4 (54.3)	18.1 (64.6)	23.5 (74.3)	26.4 (79.5)	28.7 (83.7)	30.5 (86.9)	30.9 (87.6)	25.2 (77.4)	20.7 (69.3)	15.9 (60.6)	10.7 (51.3)	21.0 (69.9)
Daily mean °C (°F)	6.6 (43.9)	8.7 (47.7)	13.6 (56.5)	18.3 (64.9)	21.3 (70.3)	24.0 (75.2)	25.6 (78.1)	25.9 (78.6)	21.4 (70.5)	17.4 (63.3)	12.9 (55.2)	7.9 (46.2)	17.0 (62.5)
Mean daily minimum °C (°F)	4.6 (40.3)	6.1 (43.0)	10.4 (50.7)	14.5 (58.1)	17.6 (63.7)	20.7 (69.3)	22.2 (72.0)	22.4 (72.3)	19.0 (66.2)	15.3 (59.5)	11.0 (51.8)	5.9 (42.6)	14.1 (57.5)
Record low °C (°F)	−3.3 (26.1)	−1.9 (28.6)	0.0 (32.0)	5.9 (42.6)	8.5 (47.3)	12.9 (55.2)	16.5 (61.7)	16.2 (61.2)	12.8 (55.0)	4.6 (40.3)	0.8 (33.4)	−4.2 (24.4)	−4.2 (24.4)
Average precipitation mm (inches)	20.4 (0.80)	26.0 (1.02)	46.1 (1.81)	85.1 (3.35)	135.0 (5.31)	161.5 (6.36)	316.2 (12.45)	347.9 (13.70)	179.5 (7.07)	87.3 (3.44)	34.9 (1.37)	24.2 (0.95)	1,464.1 (57.63)
Average precipitation days (≥ 0.1 mm)	12.8	11.7	14.4	14.6	15.3	16.6	17.1	15.1	19.6	18.2	13.8	11.0	180.2
Average snowy days	0.6	0.3	0	0	0	0	0	0	0	0	0	0.1	1
Average relative humidity (%)	79	76	72	71	71	76	80	78	83	83	83	80	78
Mean monthly sunshine hours	33.8	51.2	87.1	124.5	117.4	107.7	142.7	163.9	60.1	54.1	47.5	47.6	1,037.6
Percentage possible sunshine	11	16	23	32	28	26	33	41	16	15	15	15	23
Source: China Meteorological Administration all-time January high
