= Yuexi County, Sichuan =

Yuexi County 越西县 • ꃺꄧꑤ • ཡི་ཤིས་རྫོང་།
- County
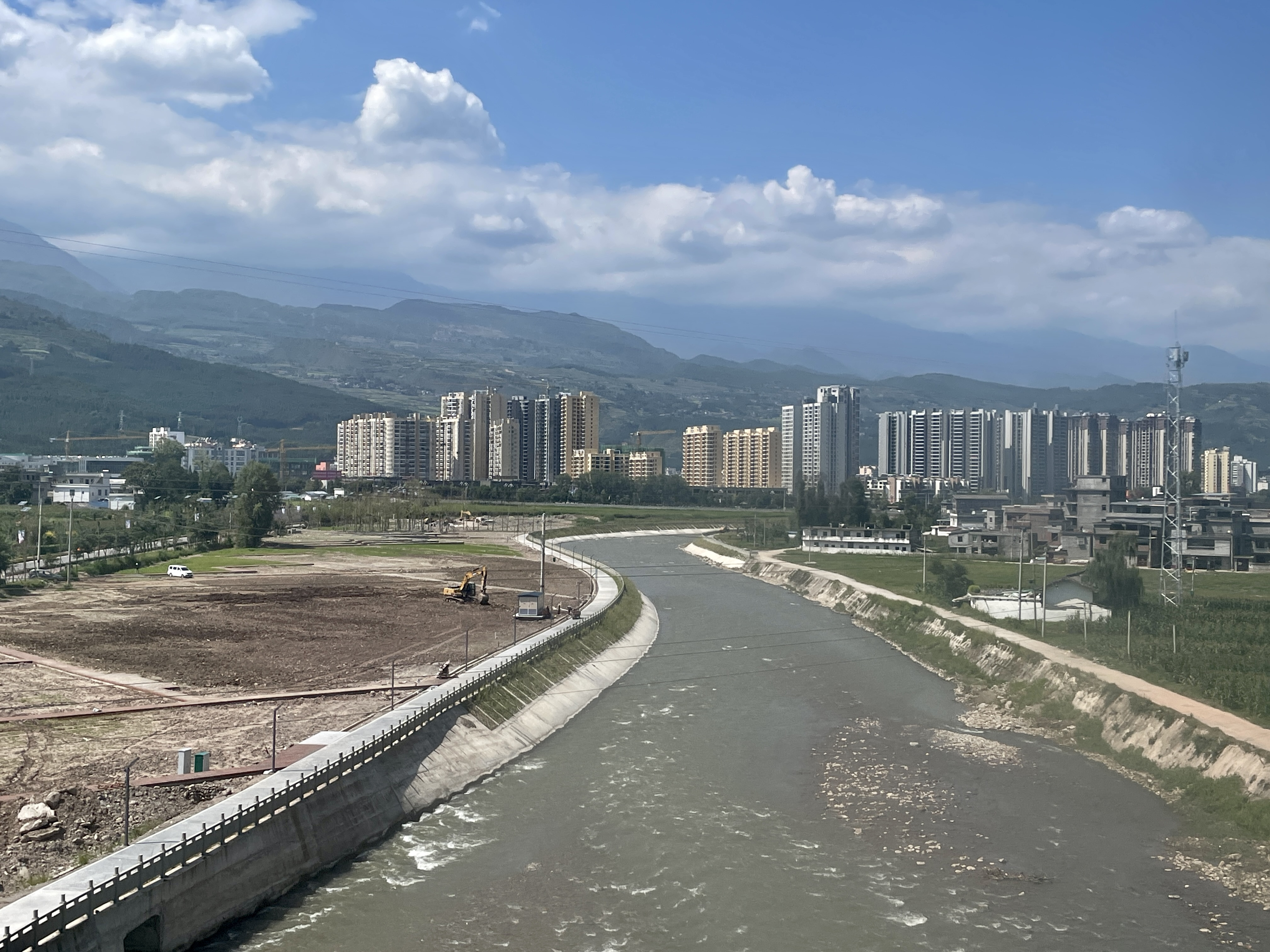

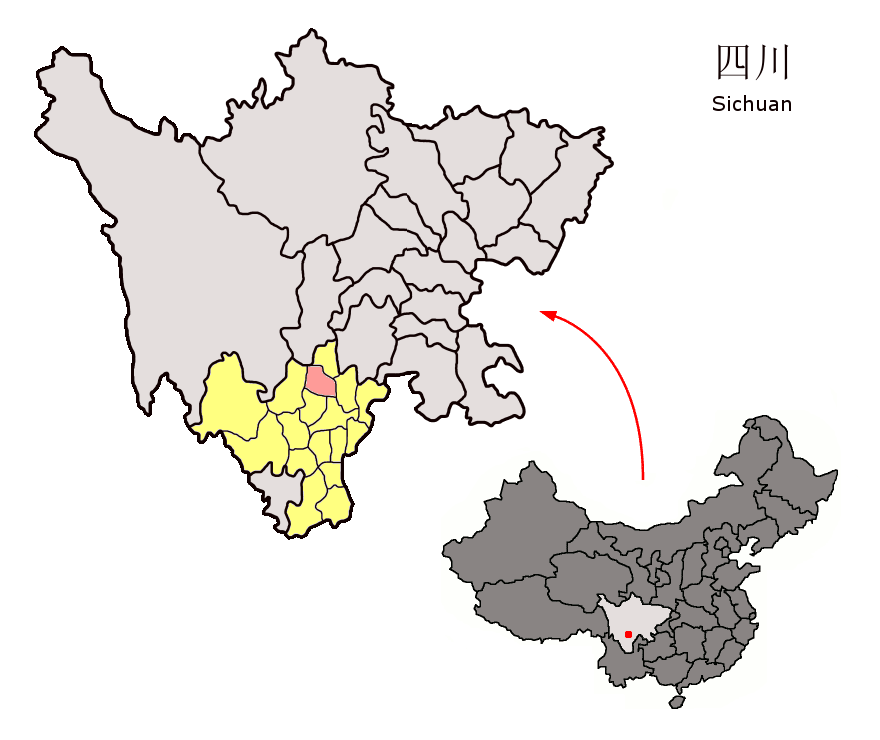
- Location of Yuexi County (red) within Liangshan Prefecture (yellow) and Sichuan

- Location of the seat in Sichuan Yuexi (China)
- Coordinates: 28°38′24″N 102°30′29″E
- Country: China
- Province: Sichuan
- Autonomous prefecture: Liangshan
- County seat: Yuecheng

Area
  - Total: 2,257 km^{2} (871 sq mi)

Population (2020)
  - Total: 301,865
  - Density: 133.7/km^{2} (346.4/sq mi)
- Time zone: UTC+8 (China Standard)
- Website: www.scyx.gov.cn

Yuexi County, Sichuan

Chinese name
- Simplified Chinese: 越西县
- Traditional Chinese: 越西縣
Transcriptions
Standard Mandarin
- Hanyu Pinyin: Yuèxī Xiàn

Tibetan name
- Tibetan: ཡི་ཤིས་རྫོང་།
Transcriptions
- Wylie: yi shis rdzong
- Tibetan Pinyin: Yixi Zong

Yi name
- Yi: ꃺꄧꑤ; Romanisation: vyt tuo xiep

Yuexi County (Chinese: 越西县, Yi: ꃺꄧꑤ, Tibetan: ཡི་ཤིས་རྫོང་།) is a county located in the north of the Liangshan Yi Autonomous Prefecture, in the south of Sichuan Province, China.

== History ==
Under imperial China, the area and its seat of government were known as 越巂 or 越嶲, variously read as Yuèxī or Yuèsuǐ in modern Chinese.

== Administrative divisions ==
Yuexi County comprises 17 towns and 2 townships.

Name	Simplified Chinese	Hanyu Pinyin	Yi	Romanized Yi	Administrative division code
Towns
Yuecheng Town	越城镇	Yuèchéng Zhèn	ꃺꍰꍔ	vyt chep zhep	513434100
Zhongsuo Town	中所镇	Zhōngsuǒ Zhèn	ꑸꍤꍔ	yiep chap zhep	513434101
Xinmin Town	新民镇	Xīnmín Zhèn	ꑟꂱꍔ	xi mip zhep	513434102
Naituo Town	乃托镇	Nǎituō Zhèn	ꆻꄧꍔ	liet tuo zhep	513434103
Puxiong Town	普雄镇	Pǔxióng Zhèn	ꁌꑪꍔ	pu xop zhep	513434104
Darui Town	大瑞镇	Dàruì Zhèn	ꄊꎵꍔ	dap shop zhep	513434105
Zhu'ajue Town	竹阿觉镇	Zhú'ājué Zhèn	ꍘꀋꐦꍔ	zhup ap jjop zhep	513434105
Shugu Town	书古镇	Shūgǔ Zhèn	ꎼꈪꍔ	shu ggut zhep	513434107
Yiluodiba Town	依洛地坝镇	Yīluòdìbà Zhèn	ꒉꇉꄹꀞꍔ	yy lo ddip bat zhep	513434108
Nanqing Town	南箐镇	Nánqìng Zhèn	ꆹꊰꍔ	li ci zhep	513434109
Gongmo Town	贡莫镇	Gòngmò Zhèn	ꈥꃀꍔ	ggop mop zhep	513434110
Meihua Town	梅花镇	Méihuā Zhèn	ꂱꉷꍔ	mip huo zhep	513434111
Erjue Town	尔觉镇	Ěrjué Zhèn	ꇓꐦꍔ	lur jjop zhep	513434112
Lapu Town	拉普镇	Lāpǔ Zhèn	ꆿꁌꍔ	lat pu zhep	513434113
Matuo Town	马拖镇	Mǎtuō Zhèn	ꂵꄧꍔ	mat tuo zhep	513434114
Dahua Town	大花镇	Dàhuā Zhèn	ꄊꉷꍔ	dap huo zhep	513434115
Banqiao Town	板桥镇	Bǎnqiáo Zhèn	ꀠꐇꍔ	ba quop zhep	513434116
Townships
Laji Township	拉吉乡	Lājí Xiāng	ꆿꐚꑣ	lat jji xie	513434235
Shenguozhuang Township	申果庄乡	Shēnguǒzhuāng Xiāng	ꌩꈤꑣ	syr ggo xie	513434236
Ethnic township
Bao'an Tibetan Ethnic Township (Bao'ain)	保安藏族乡	Bǎo'ān Zàngzú Xiāng	ꀧꉢꀒꋤꑣ	bo nga op zzup xie	513434211

== Fauna ==
The frog species Oreolalax liangbeiensis, Oreolalax puxiongensis, and Oreolalax pingii are endemic to Yuexi County. The former two have only been recorded in the Puxiong Town.

== Climate ==
Climate data for Yuexi, elevation 1,660 m (5,450 ft), (1991–2020 normals, extremes 1981–present)
Month	Jan	Feb	Mar	Apr	May	Jun	Jul	Aug	Sep	Oct	Nov	Dec	Year
Record high °C (°F)	25.1 (77.2)	28.1 (82.6)	33.2 (91.8)	33.2 (91.8)	34.8 (94.6)	34.0 (93.2)	33.8 (92.8)	34.5 (94.1)	34.5 (94.1)	30.7 (87.3)	27.3 (81.1)	23.1 (73.6)	34.8 (94.6)
Mean daily maximum °C (°F)	11.2 (52.2)	14.7 (58.5)	18.7 (65.7)	22.4 (72.3)	24.1 (75.4)	24.6 (76.3)	27.1 (80.8)	27.1 (80.8)	23.4 (74.1)	18.7 (65.7)	16.3 (61.3)	11.7 (53.1)	20.0 (68.0)
Daily mean °C (°F)	4.0 (39.2)	6.5 (43.7)	10.1 (50.2)	14.3 (57.7)	17.2 (63.0)	19.4 (66.9)	21.2 (70.2)	20.8 (69.4)	17.9 (64.2)	13.9 (57.0)	10.0 (50.0)	5.4 (41.7)	13.4 (56.1)
Mean daily minimum °C (°F)	−0.4 (31.3)	1.1 (34.0)	4.2 (39.6)	8.3 (46.9)	12.4 (54.3)	16.0 (60.8)	17.4 (63.3)	17.0 (62.6)	14.6 (58.3)	11.2 (52.2)	6.3 (43.3)	1.6 (34.9)	9.1 (48.5)
Record low °C (°F)	−10.0 (14.0)	−15.2 (4.6)	−4.6 (23.7)	−1.3 (29.7)	3.3 (37.9)	8.3 (46.9)	11.5 (52.7)	10.2 (50.4)	7.2 (45.0)	0.5 (32.9)	−4.0 (24.8)	−6.2 (20.8)	−15.2 (4.6)
Average precipitation mm (inches)	5.7 (0.22)	7.7 (0.30)	31.4 (1.24)	58.5 (2.30)	124.1 (4.89)	213.2 (8.39)	212.5 (8.37)	194.7 (7.67)	155.8 (6.13)	76.4 (3.01)	17.8 (0.70)	4.4 (0.17)	1,102.2 (43.39)
Average precipitation days (≥ 0.1 mm)	3.6	4.6	10.2	14.2	17.6	22.7	20.0	18.2	19.3	16.7	6.5	3.3	156.9
Average snowy days	6.1	4.3	1.5	0.1	0	0	0	0	0	0	0.6	3.0	15.6
Average relative humidity (%)	67	63	65	68	72	79	81	81	82	81	75	72	74
Mean monthly sunshine hours	140.8	150.5	177.8	175.0	144.7	92.3	135.7	148.7	99.7	83.2	118.9	121.3	1,588.6
Percentage possible sunshine	43	47	48	45	34	22	32	37	27	24	37	38	36
Source: China Meteorological Administration all-time Nov high
