= Ailao Mountains =

Mountain range in Yunnan, China

Coordinates: 23°50′N 101°34′E

The Ailao Mountains (Note: Chinese: 哀牢山; pinyin: Āiláoshān; shān (山) meaning mountain) are located in Yunnan, China. They extend northward from the Yun range, and are located at the intersection of the Yunnan-Guizhou Plateau, the Tibetan Plateau, and the Hengduan Mountains. The Ailao Mountain Nature Reserve, located in the Ailao Mountains, is the best-preserved example of subtropical evergreen broad-leafed forest extant in China.

It is also the watershed of the Bianjiang River and the Amo River, and it is situated between Chuxiong City and Yuxi City to the east and Pu'er City to the west. It is mainly composed of sand shale, limestone, and various metamorphic rocks. The Ailao Mountains trend northwest-southeast, from Chuxiong City in the north, to Luchun County in the south, coming to a total length of about 500 kilometers. The main peak is named Ailao Mountain, and is located in the west of Xinping Yi and Dai Autonomous County, with an altitude of 3,166 meters.

In May 1988, China established the Ailao Mountain National Nature Reserve in the Xujiaba area of the northern section of the Ailao Mountain Range, which is home to nearly 1,500 species of plants and more than 800 species of wild animals.

In November 2021, four geological surveyors went missing in the Ailao Mountains and died from hypothermia-induced cardiogenic shock.

== See also ==
Mountain ranges of China
