= Nanjiang County =

Coordinates: 32°21′12″N 106°50′34″E

Nanjiang County 南江县 Nankiang
- County
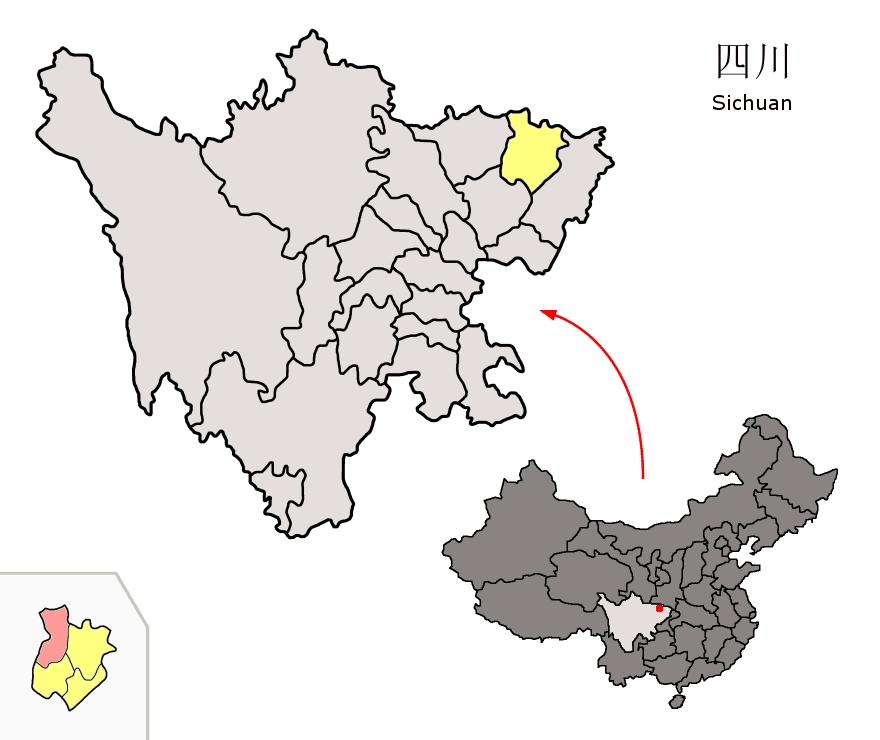
- Location of Nanjiang County (red) within Bazhong City (yellow) and Sichuan
- Country: China
- Province: Sichuan
- Prefecture-level city: Bazhong

Area
  - Total: 3,388 km^{2} (1,308 sq mi)

Population (2020)
  - Total: 467,609
  - Density: 138.0/km^{2} (357.5/sq mi)
- Time zone: UTC+8 (China Standard)

Nanjiang County (Chinese: 南江县; pinyin: Nánjiāng Xiàn) is a county in the northeast of Sichuan Province, China, bordering Shaanxi province to the north. It is under the administration of Bazhong city.

== Administrative divisions ==
Nanjiang County comprises 1 subdistrict, 29 towns and 2 townships:

subdistricts

- Jizhou 集州街道

towns

- Shahe 沙河镇
- Changchi 长赤镇
- Zhengzhi 正直镇
- Dahe 大河镇
- Guangwushan 光雾山镇
- Xialiang 下两镇
- Ganchang 赶场镇
- Yangba 杨坝镇
- Tianchi 天池镇
- Guanba 关坝镇
- Hongguang 红光镇
- Yuantan 元潭镇
- Chixi 赤溪镇
- Bamiao 八庙镇
- Shuangliu 双流镇
- Pinghe 坪河镇
- Qiaoting 桥亭镇
- Heping 和平镇
- Houjia 侯家镇
- Renhe 仁和镇
- Gaota 高塔镇
- Xingma 兴马镇
- Guanmen 关门镇
- Shitan 石滩镇
- Gaoqiao 高桥镇
- Guimin 贵民镇
- Guanlu 关路镇
- Yunding 云顶镇
- Gongshan 公山镇

townships

- Tuanjie 团结乡
- Shenmen 神门乡

== Climate ==
Climate data for Nanjiang, elevation 579 m (1,900 ft), (1991–2020 normals, extremes 1981–present)
| Month | Jan | Feb | Mar | Apr | May | Jun | Jul | Aug | Sep | Oct | Nov | Dec | Year |
|---|---|---|---|---|---|---|---|---|---|---|---|---|---|
| Record high °C (°F) | 19.3 (66.7) | 23.2 (73.8) | 33.1 (91.6) | 33.9 (93.0) | 38.4 (101.1) | 37.4 (99.3) | 40.2 (104.4) | 40.3 (104.5) | 37.7 (99.9) | 31.1 (88.0) | 26.2 (79.2) | 19.4 (66.9) | 40.3 (104.5) |
| Mean daily maximum °C (°F) | 9.6 (49.3) | 12.4 (54.3) | 17.6 (63.7) | 23.3 (73.9) | 27.0 (80.6) | 29.7 (85.5) | 31.8 (89.2) | 32.0 (89.6) | 26.3 (79.3) | 21.1 (70.0) | 15.9 (60.6) | 10.6 (51.1) | 21.4 (70.6) |
| Daily mean °C (°F) | 5.2 (41.4) | 7.7 (45.9) | 12.0 (53.6) | 17.0 (62.6) | 20.8 (69.4) | 23.9 (75.0) | 26.1 (79.0) | 25.8 (78.4) | 21.3 (70.3) | 16.3 (61.3) | 11.3 (52.3) | 6.4 (43.5) | 16.2 (61.1) |
| Mean daily minimum °C (°F) | 2.2 (36.0) | 4.5 (40.1) | 8.0 (46.4) | 12.5 (54.5) | 16.3 (61.3) | 19.8 (67.6) | 22.2 (72.0) | 21.8 (71.2) | 18.1 (64.6) | 13.4 (56.1) | 8.3 (46.9) | 3.6 (38.5) | 12.6 (54.6) |
| Record low °C (°F) | −4.8 (23.4) | −2.3 (27.9) | −2.8 (27.0) | 2.1 (35.8) | 8.0 (46.4) | 12.5 (54.5) | 15.5 (59.9) | 13.3 (55.9) | 11.0 (51.8) | −0.3 (31.5) | −1.6 (29.1) | −6.1 (21.0) | −6.1 (21.0) |
| Average precipitation mm (inches) | 6.3 (0.25) | 12.7 (0.50) | 27.9 (1.10) | 64.7 (2.55) | 121.2 (4.77) | 173.9 (6.85) | 271.3 (10.68) | 181.0 (7.13) | 198.6 (7.82) | 87.6 (3.45) | 39.5 (1.56) | 8.3 (0.33) | 1,193 (46.99) |
| Average precipitation days (≥ 0.1 mm) | 6.1 | 6.7 | 8.7 | 11.4 | 13.3 | 13.1 | 15.7 | 13.6 | 13.8 | 13.5 | 8.8 | 6.2 | 130.9 |
| Average snowy days | 2.3 | 1.1 | 0.2 | 0 | 0 | 0 | 0 | 0 | 0 | 0 | 0.1 | 0.6 | 4.3 |
| Average relative humidity (%) | 72 | 70 | 66 | 68 | 69 | 74 | 78 | 75 | 80 | 80 | 78 | 75 | 74 |
| Mean monthly sunshine hours | 80.7 | 75.0 | 117.6 | 155.3 | 172.6 | 165.9 | 194.2 | 204.1 | 122.5 | 106.6 | 92.7 | 81.8 | 1,569 |
| Percentage possible sunshine | 25 | 24 | 31 | 40 | 40 | 39 | 45 | 50 | 33 | 31 | 30 | 26 | 35 |
Source: China Meteorological Administration
