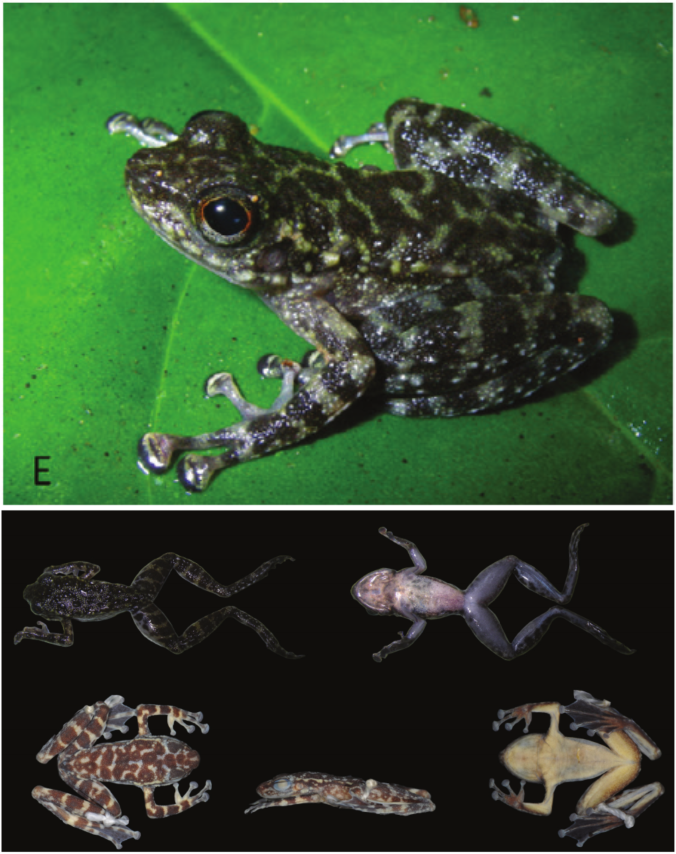
- The three specimensat the bottom have been stored in preservative. The others are alive.

Scientific classification
- Kingdom: Animalia
- Phylum: Chordata
- Class: Amphibia
- Order: Anura
- Family: Ranidae
- Genus: Amolops
- Species: A. attiguus

Binomial name
- Amolops attiguus Sheridan, Phimmachak, Sivongxay, Stuart, 2023
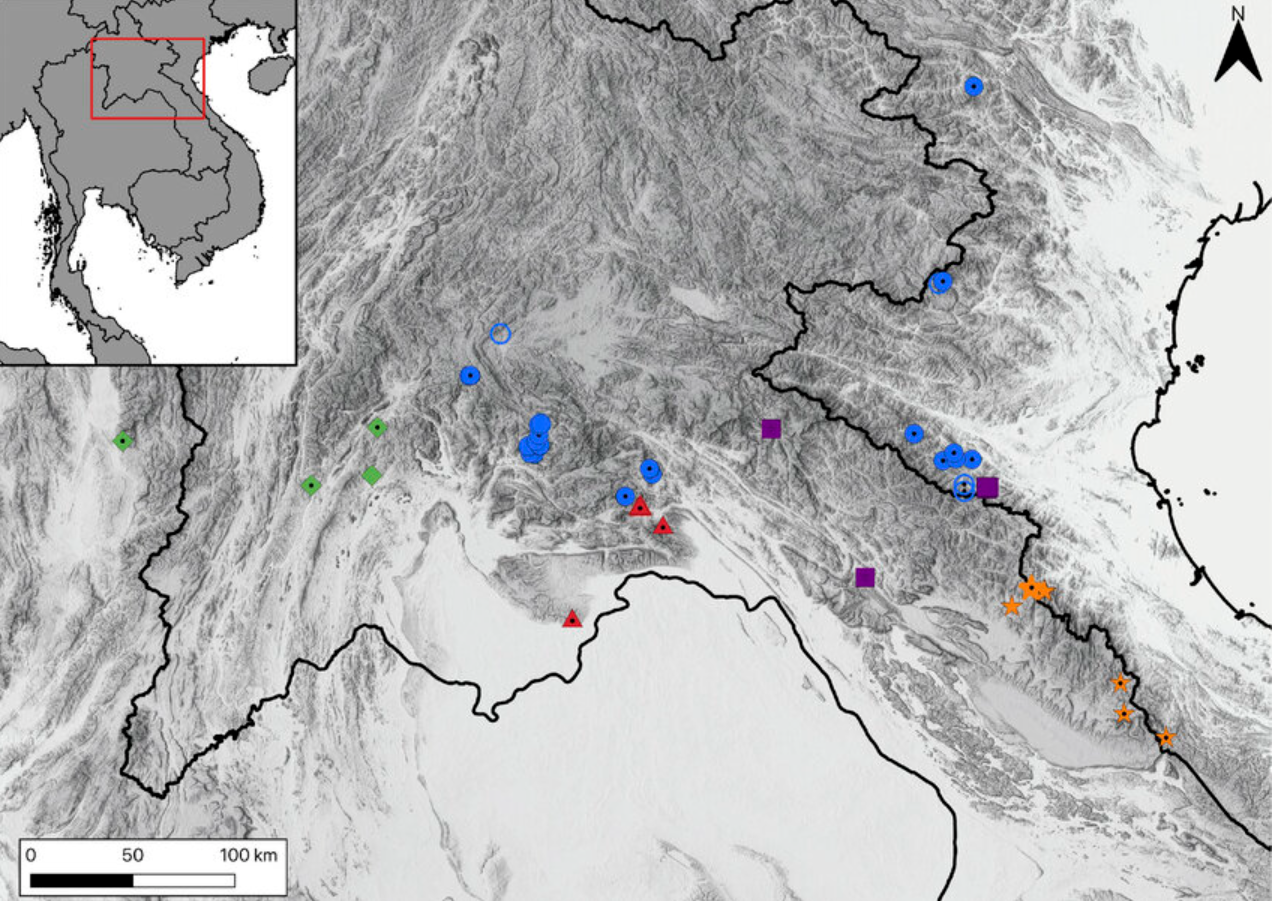
- Range map of Amolops attiguus among others – A. attiguus shown by purple dots only

= Amolops attiguus =

Species of frog

Amolops attiguus, the similar Lao torrent frog, is a species of true frog found in eastern Bolikhamxay Province and Xieng Khouang Province, Laos.

== Description ==
Amolops attiguus is a small green frog with a mottled brown pattern covering most of the dorsal side (upper side). The dorsal side of the legs has dark bands. The ventral side (underside) is light with some dark spots and the ventral side of the legs is bluish-purple. Seven total specimens have been collected and examined, which is a relatively small sample size. Out of the five examined males, the SVL was 28.9–31.3 mm (1.14–1.23 in), and of the two females, it was 39.2–39.4 mm (1.54–1.55 in). This shows clear sexual dimorphism in that the male is smaller than the female.

== Distribution and ecology ==
Amolops attiguus is native to Laos but has also been found in Northern Vietnam in the Pù Mát National Park. Specimens have been collected at an elevation of 273–454 m (896–1,490 ft). It can be found in or around clear streams.

== Etymology ==
The common name, similar Lao torrent frog, refers to the similarity between it and the species it was originally designated to; the Lao torrent frog (Amolops cremnobatus). Amolops attiguus is native to Laos and therefore has a Lao-inspired name. Attigua means "adjacent" or "neighboring" in Lao and "attiguus" is a Latinized version of that. The reason behind the name is that it can be found in between two similar species; Amolops tanfuilianae and Amolops kottelati.
