= A. assamensis =

A. assamensis may refer to:

- Antheraea assamensis, the Assam silk moth, a moth species
- Amolops assamensis, a frog species
