= Amolops tuberodepressus =

Conservation status
- Vulnerable (IUCN 3.1)

Scientific classification
- Kingdom: Animalia
- Phylum: Chordata
- Class: Amphibia
- Order: Anura
- Family: Ranidae
- Genus: Amolops
- Species: A. tuberodepressus

Binomial name
- Amolops tuberodepressus Liu and Yang, 2000

Species of frog

Amolops tuberodepressus is a species of frog in the family Ranidae. It is endemic to Yunnan, China and known from Wuliang and Ailao Mountains in Jingdong County. Once suspected to be synonym of Amolops mantzorum, its validity was confirmed with molecular methods in 2014.

== Description ==
Adult males measure 44–57 mm (1.7–2.2 in) and adult females 61–71 mm (2.4–2.8 in) in snout–vent length. The overall appearance is moderately depressed and slender. The head is depressed and slightly longer than it is wide. The snout is rounded. The tympanum is distinct. The fingers and toes bear large discs; the toes are webbed. Dorsal ground color ranges from brown to greenish. The dorsal pattern consists of rounded or irregular green or bluish green spots. The flanks are green with irregular dark brown spots. The limbs are green with brown crossbars. The belly is yellowish cream and the throat is grey. The iris is brown with irregular bright small yellow spots.

== Habitat and conservation ==
Amolops tuberodepressus inhabits montane rapids and streams with small waterfalls in evergreen broad-leaved forests at elevations of 1,500–2,400 m (4,900–7,900 ft) above sea level. It is threatened by habitat loss caused by small-scale wood extraction and small hydroelectric dams.
