= Amolops hainanensis =

Conservation status
- Endangered (IUCN 3.1)

Scientific classification
- Kingdom: Animalia
- Phylum: Chordata
- Class: Amphibia
- Order: Anura
- Family: Ranidae
- Genus: Amolops
- Species: A. hainanensis

Binomial name
- Amolops hainanensis (Boulenger, 1900)

Species of frog

Amolops hainanensis is a species of frog in the family Ranidae that is endemic to southwestern and central Hainan, China. Its natural habitats are subtropical or tropical moist lowland forests and rivers. It is threatened by habitat loss. It is a sister taxa to both A. torrentis and A. daiyunnensis.
