= Macomb Courthouse Square Historic District =

United States historic place

- U.S. National Register of Historic Places
- U.S. Historic district
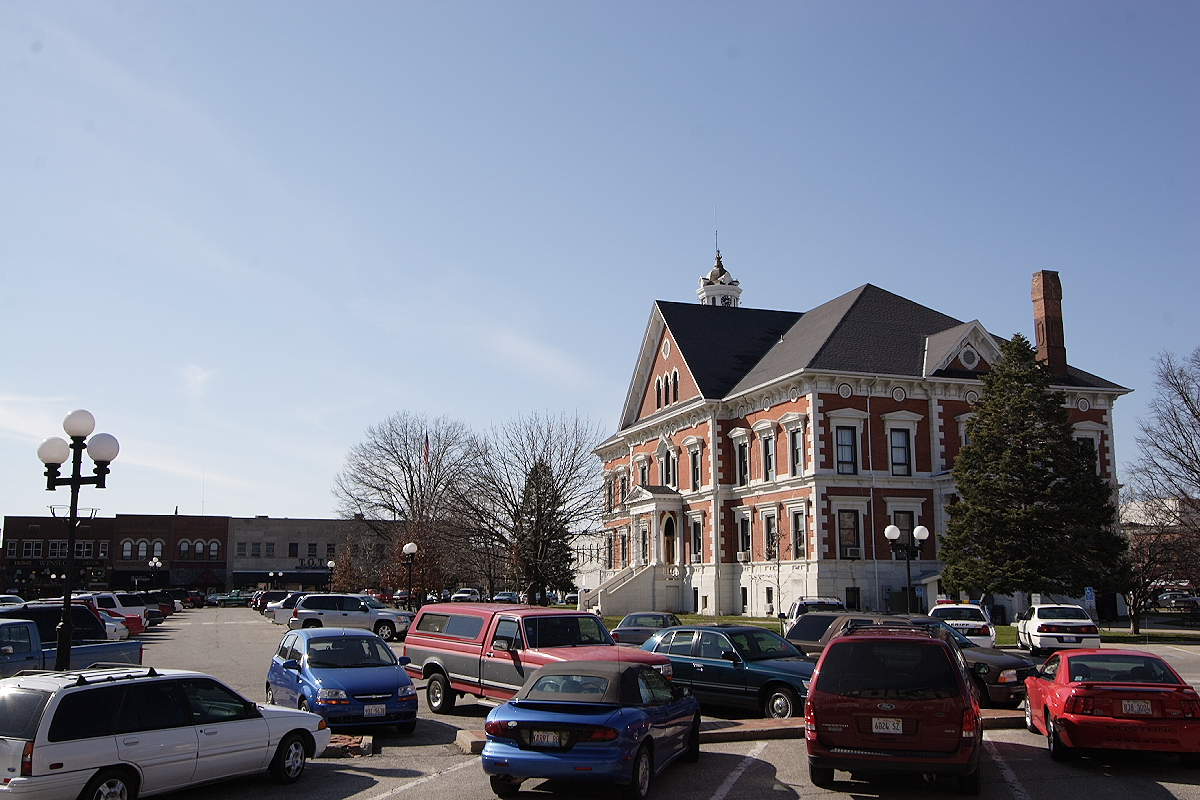

- Location within Illinois Location within the United States
- Location: Roughly bounded by E. and W. Washington, S. McArthur, E. Calhoun, and S. Campbell Sts., Macomb, Illinois
- Coordinates: 40°27′34″N 90°40′16″W
- NRHP reference No.: 13000295
- Added to NRHP: May 22, 2013

The Macomb Courthouse Square Historic District is a historic district located in downtown Macomb, Illinois. The district covers six full and four partial city blocks and includes 65 contributing buildings. The McDonough County Courthouse, an 1871 Second Empire building, is the centerpiece of the district. The courthouse is situated in the middle of a Harrisonburg-style courthouse square, which is flanked by two north-south streets and intersected by a single east-west street that splits around the courthouse; the layout is unusual in Illinois, though Stark County has a similar layout. The surrounding buildings are mainly commercial, though several are government buildings. Brick commercial blocks, often with Italianate or Queen Anne details, dominate the district's architectural landscape; the district's more modern buildings, which date to the first half of the twentieth century, mostly have Art Deco or Moderne styling.

The district was added to the National Register of Historic Places on May 22, 2013.
