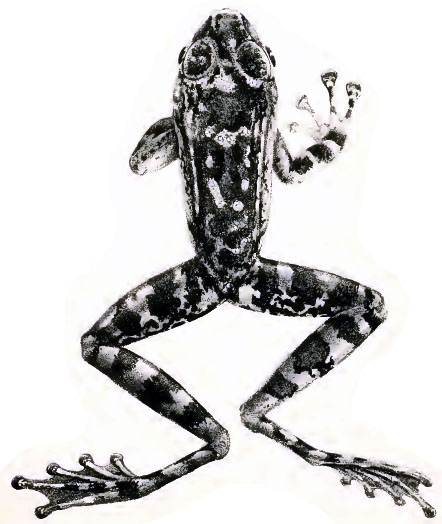
- Amolops larutensis from Boulenger's species description (syntype)

Conservation status
- Least Concern (IUCN 3.1)

Scientific classification
- Kingdom: Animalia
- Phylum: Chordata
- Class: Amphibia
- Order: Anura
- Family: Ranidae
- Genus: Amolops
- Species: A. larutensis

Binomial name
- Amolops larutensis (Boulenger, 1899)

Synonyms
- Rana larutensis Boulenger, 1899

= Amolops larutensis =

Species of frog

Amolops larutensis (common names: Larut sucker frog, Larut Hill cascade frog, southern pad-discked frog) is a species of frog in the family Ranidae that is found in the Malay Peninsula from southernmost Thailand to Malaysia; records further north probably represent A. panhai.

== Description ==
Male Amolops larutensis grow to a snout–vent length of 35–45 mm (1.4–1.8 in) and females to 53–75 mm (2.1–3.0 in). They have large discs in their finger tips and smaller ones in the toe tips. They have granular skin; their back is pale yellowish green with dark blotches but they are white from under. Tadpoles have large ventral suckers which they use to attach themselves to rocky surfaces.

== Habitat ==
Amolops larutensis is a common and abundant species occurring on boulders and bedrock in and along fast-flowing, clear-water forest streams both in lowlands and highlands. It may be the most common frog in forest boulder streams all through the Malay Peninsula. It is not considered threatened by the International Union for Conservation of Nature (IUCN).
