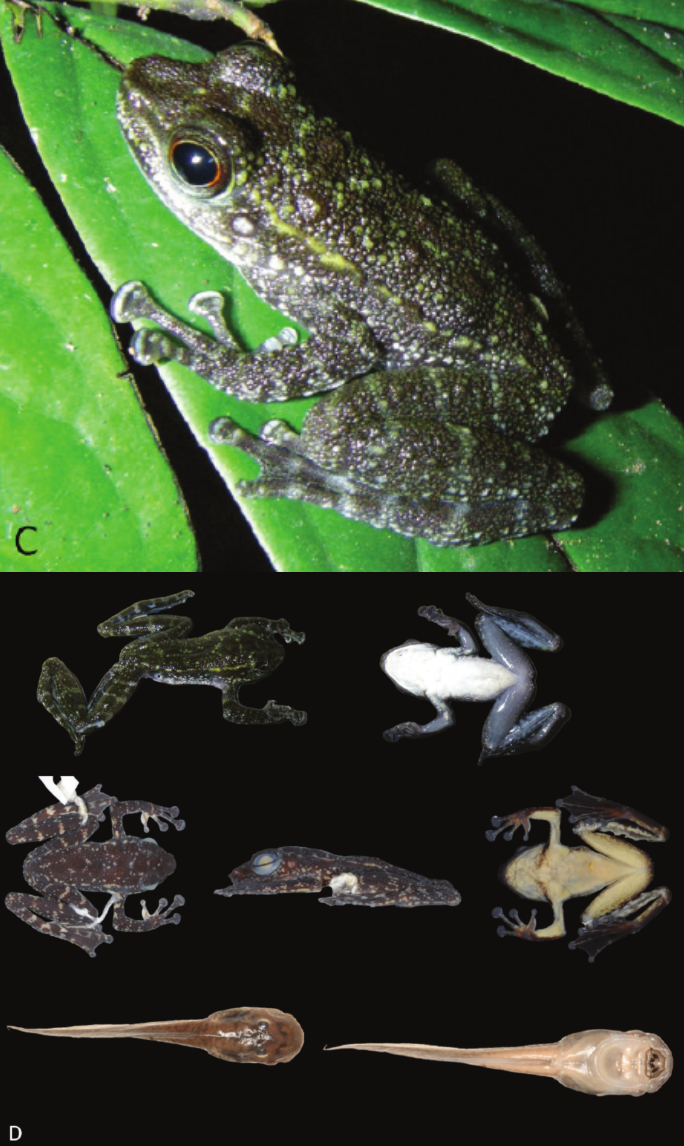
- Amolops sengae C = In life Middle 1 = In life Middle 2 = In preservative D = Tadpole in preservative

Scientific classification
- Kingdom: Animalia
- Phylum: Chordata
- Class: Amphibia
- Order: Anura
- Family: Ranidae
- Genus: Amolops
- Species: A. sengae

Binomial name
- Amolops sengae Sheridan, Phimmachak, Sivongxay, Stuart, 2023
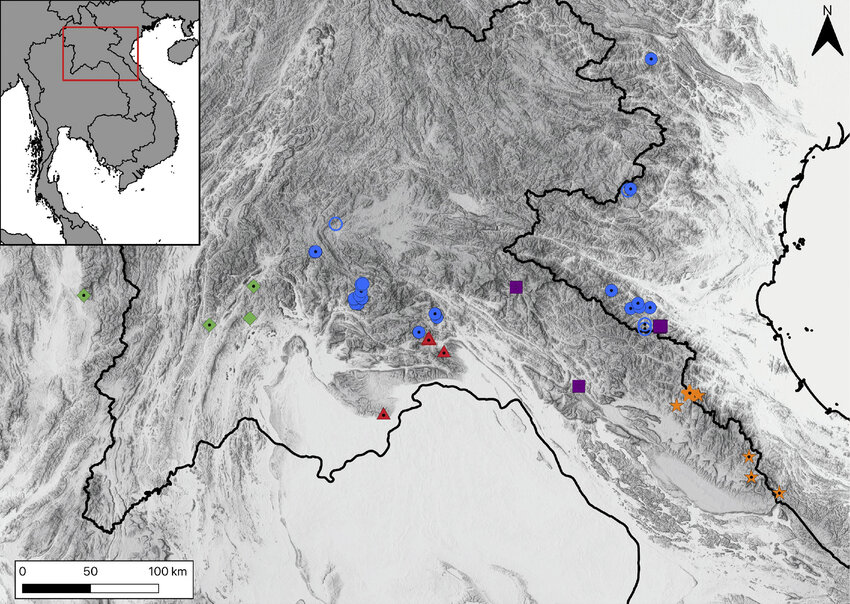
- Range map showing the distribution of Amolops sengae among others. A. sengae is only shown by the green diamonds.

= Amolops sengae =

Species of frog

Amolops sengae, or Seng's Lao torrent frog, is a species of true frog found in Laos.

== Description ==
Amolops sengae is a relatively small, greenish-brown frog. They do show sexual dimorphism in that males are smaller than females. 7 specimens have been collected of the species, which is a relatively small sample size. Out of the 5 examined males, the SVL was 27.2–31.2 mm (1.07–1.23 in) and out of the 2 females, it was 39.2–39.6 mm (1.54–1.56 in). Male specimens were darker than females on the dorsal side. Females had more beige mottling.

== Distribution and ecology ==
The species is found in the Vientiane province and the Sainyabuli province in Laos. There may be a population in the Nan province in Thailand, but this is not definitive. It can be found in and around clear streams, sometimes on leaves. Specimens have been collected at elevations of around 200–300 m (660–980 ft).

== Etymology ==
Both the common and scientific name is a tribute to Sengvilay ("Seng") Seateun from the National University of Laos. She is a collector and supplied a lot of the material used to describe Amolops sengae among other species.
