= Amolops assamensis =

Conservation status
- Vulnerable (IUCN 3.1)

Scientific classification
- Kingdom: Animalia
- Phylum: Chordata
- Class: Amphibia
- Order: Anura
- Family: Ranidae
- Genus: Amolops
- Species: A. assamensis

Binomial name
- Amolops assamensis Sengupta, Hussain, Choudhury, Gogoi, Ahmed, and Choudhury, 2008

Species of amphibian

The Assamese cascade frog, Assam stream frog, Assam cascade frog, or Sengupta's cascade frog (Amolops assamensis) is a species of frogs that was discovered in 2008 in Mayeng Hill Reserve Forest, Kamrup District, Assam in north-eastern India.

== Description ==
The adult male frog measures 52.80–61.50 mm in snout-vent length and the adult female frog 82.50–94.40 mm. The skin of the dorsum is olive-green in color with round or irregular brown blotches. The sides of the head are also olive-green in color with brown marks. The legs are yellow with red-brown marks.

== Habitat ==
This frog lives in canopied forests, where it has been found in and near fast-flowing streams, especially in the splash areas on rocks. Scientists observed this frog between 80 and 1580 meters above sea level.

Scientists have seen the frog in some protected parks: Mayeng Hill Reserve Forest, Kolaghat Reserve Forest, Garbhanga Reserve Forest, Amchang Wildlife Sanctuary, and Nongkhylem Wildlife Sanctuary.

== Threats ==
The IUCN classifies this frog as vulnerable to extinction. Its principal threats include habitat loss in favor of agriculture and human habitation. Scientists consider overharvesting a possible threat, but it has yet to be confirmed.
