= Amolops gerutu =

Conservation status
- Vulnerable (IUCN 3.1)

Scientific classification
- Kingdom: Animalia
- Phylum: Chordata
- Class: Amphibia
- Order: Anura
- Family: Ranidae
- Genus: Amolops
- Species: A. gerutu

Binomial name
- Amolops gerutu Chan, Abraham, Grismer & Grismer, 2018

Species of frog

Amolops gerutu, the tuberculated torrent frog, is a species of true frog found in Peninsular Malaysia.

== Description ==
It is a small, yellowish-green frog with dark mottling. The dorsal side of the limbs has dark bands. They have a somewhat rough surface. It is light on the ventral side with dark feet. It has characteristic dorsal tubercles, which can be used to distinguish it from similar species. The species shows clear sexual dimorphism in that the male is smaller than the female. Males have an SVL of 34–37.2 mm (1.34–1.46 in) and females have an SVL of 45–58.2 mm (1.77–2.29 in).

== Distribution and ecology ==
It can be found in various forests in the state of Pahang. The species can be found in and around rocky torrents in forested areas. They will never stray far from the torrent but can be found on rocks and leaves at night and hiding between rocks during the day. Tadpoles are gastromyzophorous, which means that they have suckers on their ventral side and can be found clinging to rocks.

== Etymology ==
The dorsal tubercles are diagnostic for the tuberculated torrent frog. The species name "gerutu" (pronounced "gir-roo-too") is the Malay word for "tubercle".
