= Amolops daiyunensis =

Conservation status
- Near Threatened (IUCN 3.1)

Scientific classification
- Kingdom: Animalia
- Phylum: Chordata
- Class: Amphibia
- Order: Anura
- Family: Ranidae
- Genus: Amolops
- Species: A. daiyunensis

Binomial name
- Amolops daiyunensis (Liu & Hu, 1975)

Species of frog

Amolops daiyunensis, the Daiyun torrent frog, is a species of frog. The species is known to inhabit high-gradient streams of central Fujian, northeastern Jiangxi, China. The species was listed as Near Threatened by the IUCN in 2019.
