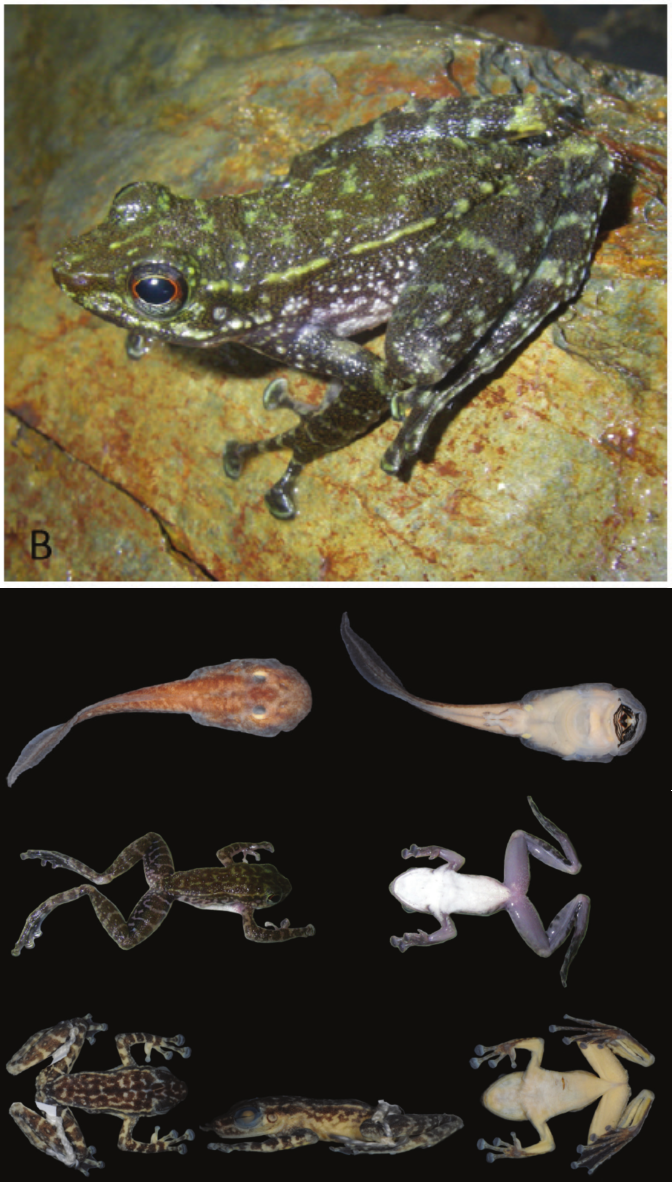
- 1 = Live specimen 2 = Preserved tadpole 3 = Live specimen 4 = preserved specimen

Scientific classification
- Kingdom: Animalia
- Phylum: Chordata
- Class: Amphibia
- Order: Anura
- Family: Ranidae
- Genus: Amolops
- Species: A. tanfuilianae

Binomial name
- Amolops tanfuilianae Sheridan, Phimmachak, Sivongxay, Stuart, 2023
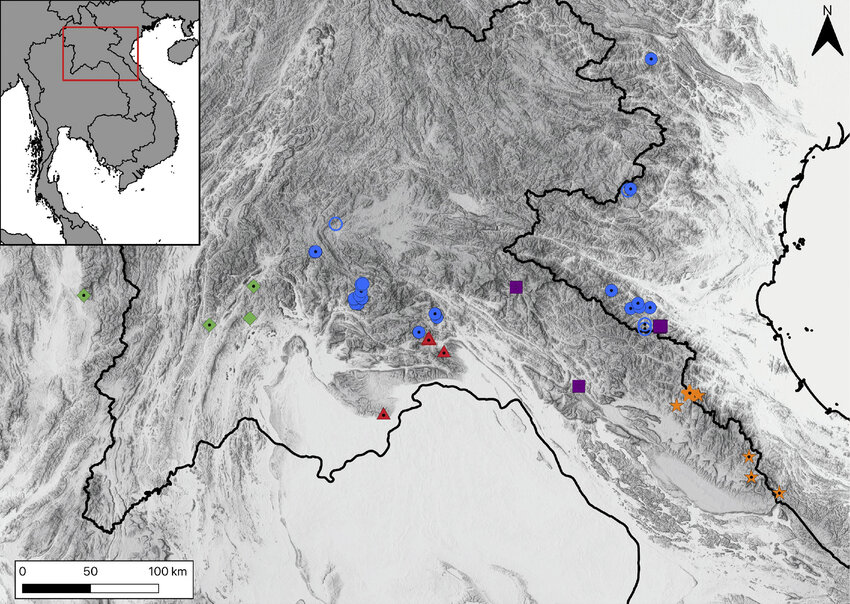
- Amolops tanfuilianae is only shown by the blue circles

= Amolops tanfuilianae =

Species of frog

Amolops tanfuilianae, or Fui Lian's Lao torrent frog, is a species of true frog found in Laos and Northern Vietnam.

== Description ==
It is a relatively small brown frog with green mottling on the dorsal side. Ventrally, it has no patterning and is also white or yellow, which varies based on the individual. The ventral side of the limbs is bluish-purple because of their transparency. The ventral side of the hands and feet is dark brown. Almost none of the 98 collected individuals had large green/beige blotches. The SVL of males ranges from 28.0 to 35.3 mm (1.10 to 1.39 in) and in females, it ranges from 35.0w–43.1 mm (1.38–1.70 in).

== Distribution and ecology ==
Amolops tanfuilianae can be found in and around clear streams, sometimes on leaves. Specimens have been collected at elevations of 300–1,594 m (984–5,230 ft). It is known from the following Lao provinces: Xieng Khouang, Luang Phabang, and Xaysomboun. However, it has also been found in Northern Vietnam in the Thanh Hoa Province and Nghe An Province.

== Etymology ==
Both the common name and scientific name are in honor of the Malaysian herpetologist Tan Fui Lian because of her impact on Southeast Asian herpetology. Tan Fui Lian is also the late wife of Robert F. Inger.
