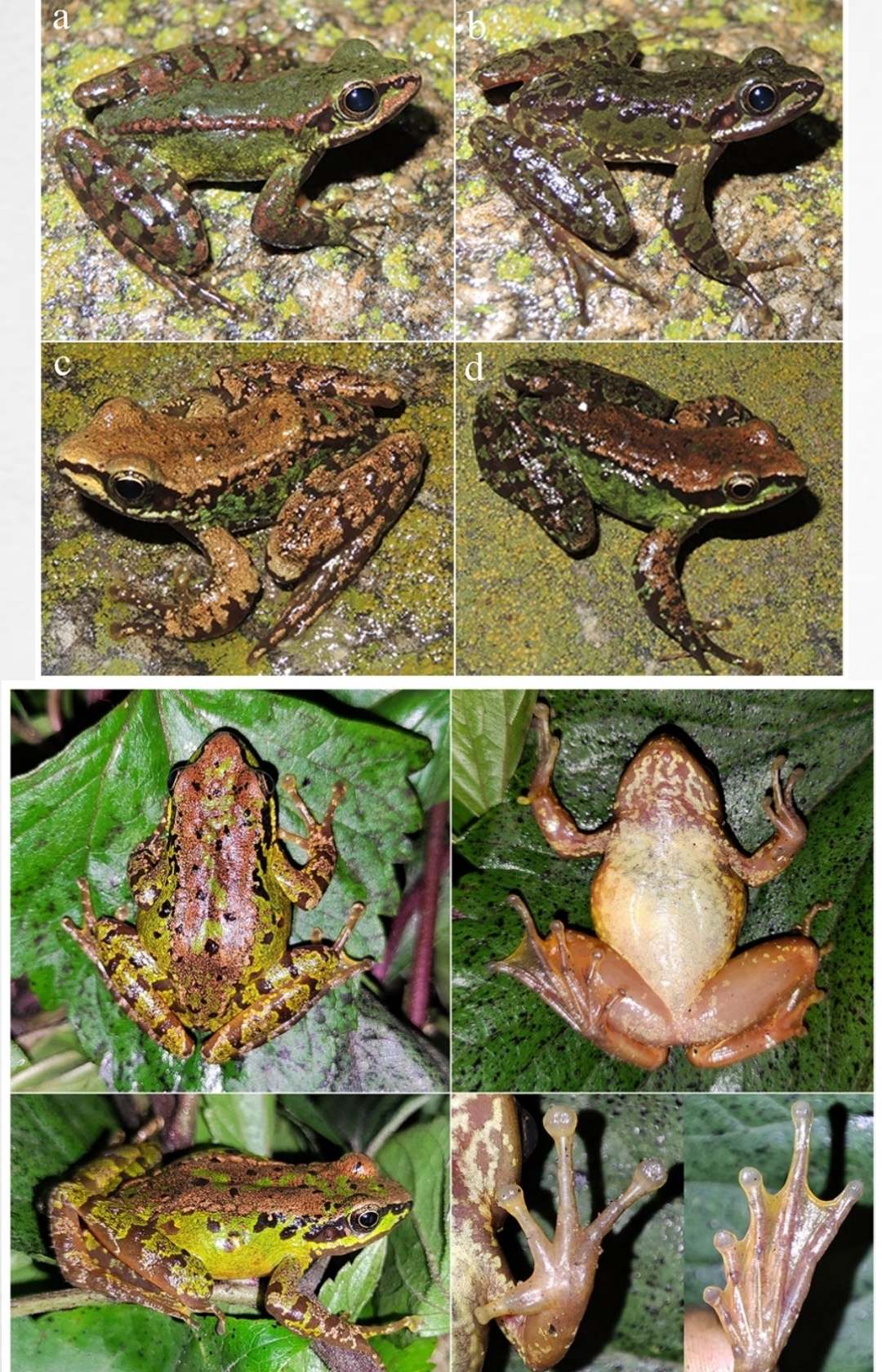
- Males on top and females on the bottom

Scientific classification
- Kingdom: Animalia
- Phylum: Chordata
- Class: Amphibia
- Order: Anura
- Family: Ranidae
- Genus: Amolops
- Species: A. ailao

Binomial name
- Amolops ailao Tang, Sun, Liu, Luo, Yu & Du, 2023
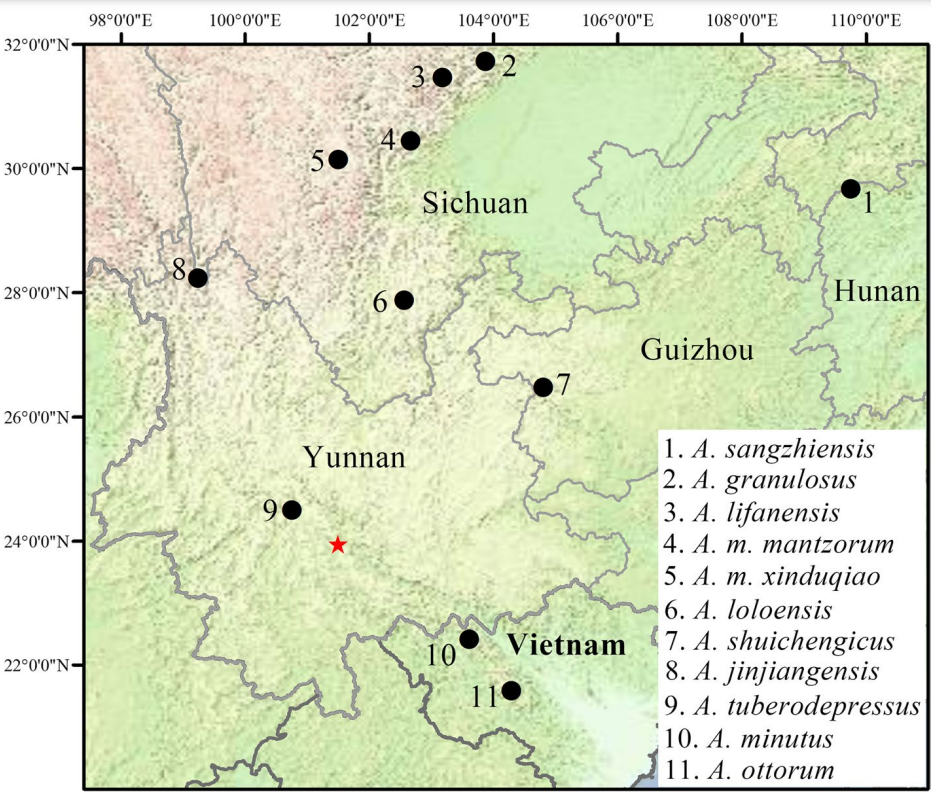
- Red star shows Amolops ailao

= Amolops ailao =

Species of frog

Amolops ailao, the Ailao cascade frog, is a species of true frog found on Mt. Ailao in the Yunnan Province, China.

== Description ==
There is much variation in within the species. They show sexual dimorphism in that the female is bigger than the male. It is morphologically similar to its sister taxon Amolops ottorum.

== Distribution and ecology ==
All specimens were collected from the same place. They were collected near a stream on leaves and branches at night. No specimens were collected over 2 meters (6.5 ft) from the ground. Their breeding season might be from May to July.

== Etymology ==
The name Amolops ailao is derived from the type locality (the place it was first discovered), which is the Ailao Mountains, China.
