= Amolops siju =

Scientific classification
- Kingdom: Animalia
- Phylum: Chordata
- Class: Amphibia
- Order: Anura
- Family: Ranidae
- Genus: Amolops
- Species: A. siju

Binomial name
- Amolops siju Saikia, Sinha, Shabnam & Dinesh, 2023

Species of frog

Amolops siju, the Siju Cave frog, is a species of true frog found in the Siju Cave, India.

== Description ==
It is brown with green mottling and it has dark bands on the legs. The ventral side is light with dark patches. Only 4 specimens have been collected of the species. The 3 females had an SVL of 85–94 mm (3.3–3.7 in) and the single male had an SVL of 63 mm (2.5 in), which shows a drastic size difference (sexual dimorphism).

== Distribution and ecology ==
It has only been found in Siju Cave but it is hypothesized that they migrate down there. Siju Cave is made of limestone and maintains a steady temperature and humidity, which may be attractive for a frog looking for warmth. This hypothesis is further supported by the fact that the frog has no troglobitic adaptations to life in a cave. This means that the frog might also be found outside the cave and therefore have a wider distribution.

== Etymology ==
Both the common and scientific name comes from the type locality, which is the Siju Cave.
