= Amolops chakrataensis =

Conservation status
- Data Deficient (IUCN 3.1)

Scientific classification
- Kingdom: Animalia
- Phylum: Chordata
- Class: Amphibia
- Order: Anura
- Family: Ranidae
- Genus: Amolops
- Species: A. chakrataensis

Binomial name
- Amolops chakrataensis Ray, 1992
- Amolops chakrataensis is only known from near Chakrata in northern India

Species of amphibian

Amolops chakrataensis, also known as the Dehradun stream frog or Chakrata torrent frog, is a species of frog endemic to India. It is only known from its type locality near Chakrata in Uttarakhand (formerly Uttar Pradesh), near the Tiger Falls. It was described based on a single specimen collected in 1985. After being "lost" for 25 years, the species was rediscovered in 2011 at its type locality, reflecting the lack of field work in the area.

== Description ==
The holotype measures 55 mm (2.2 in) in snout–vent length. The head is wider than it is long. The eyes are relatively small. The snout is obtusely pointed. The tympanum is visible and the supratympanic fold is distinct. The fingers are long and slender and have well-developed terminal discs. The toe discs are smaller than the fingers ones. The dorsum is slaty brown (or light green with dark minute spots). The sides are olive to dark green. A dark brown canthal streak is bounded by white supratympanic fold. The upper lip is golden yellow and the lower one has brown patches. The limbs have brown crossbars. The ventral side is speckled with brown.

== Habitat and conservation ==
Amolops chakrataensis is a semi-aquatic species that occurs under rocks in stagnant pools near fast-flowing hill-streams in dense deodar forest at an elevation of about 1,000–1,500 m (3,300–4,900 ft) above sea level. The eggs are laid on the leaves of aquatic plants. The threats to this poorly-known species are unknown, but the habitat near the Tiger Falls is highly degraded.
