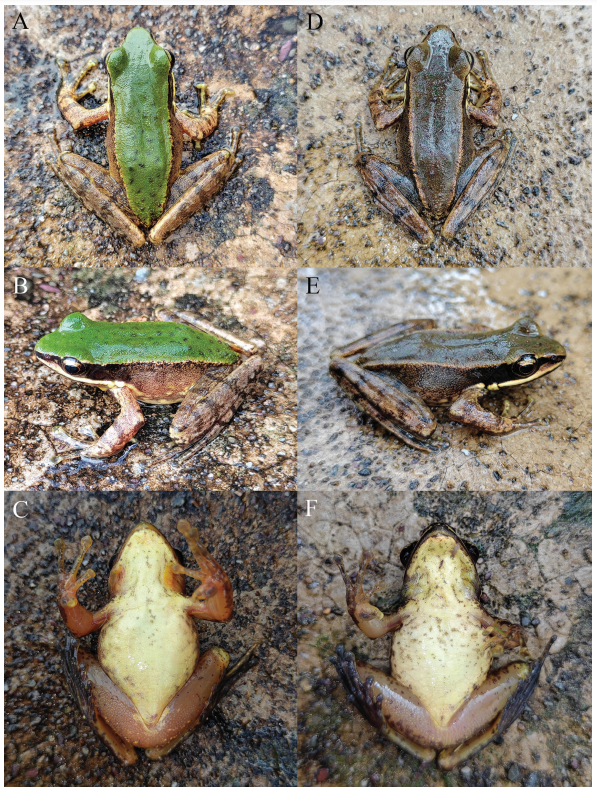
- Two males

Scientific classification
- Kingdom: Animalia
- Phylum: Chordata
- Class: Amphibia
- Order: Anura
- Family: Ranidae
- Genus: Amolops
- Species: A. truongi

Binomial name
- Amolops truongi Pham, Pham, Ngo, Nenh, Ziegler & Minh Duc Le, 2023
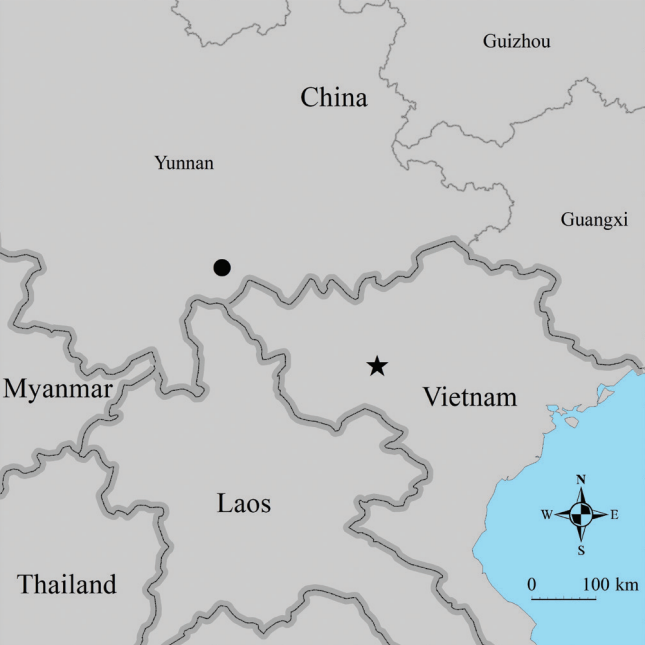
- The star shows the type locality and the dot shows the Chinese locality.

= Amolops truongi =

Species of frog

Amolops truongi is a species of true frog from Vietnam and China.

== Description ==
Amolops truongi is a green and/or brown frog. The species has been described from ten specimens, though later ones have been found. The seven examined males had an SVL of 37.5–41.3 mm (1.48–1.63 in) and the three females had an SVL of 61.5–62.5 mm (2.42–2.46 in).

== Distribution and ecology ==
The species is known from the following two localities: Muong La District in Son La Province, Vietnam, and Lvchun County in southern Yunnan Province, China.

Specimens have been collected at night between 18:30 and 21:00 p.m. They can be found at 1,200–1,430 m (3,940–4,690 ft) asl. They may be found on trees and rocks near streams 0.3–1 m (1 ft 0 in – 3 ft 3 in) above ground level. Their preferred temperature is 20–25 °C (68–77 °F).

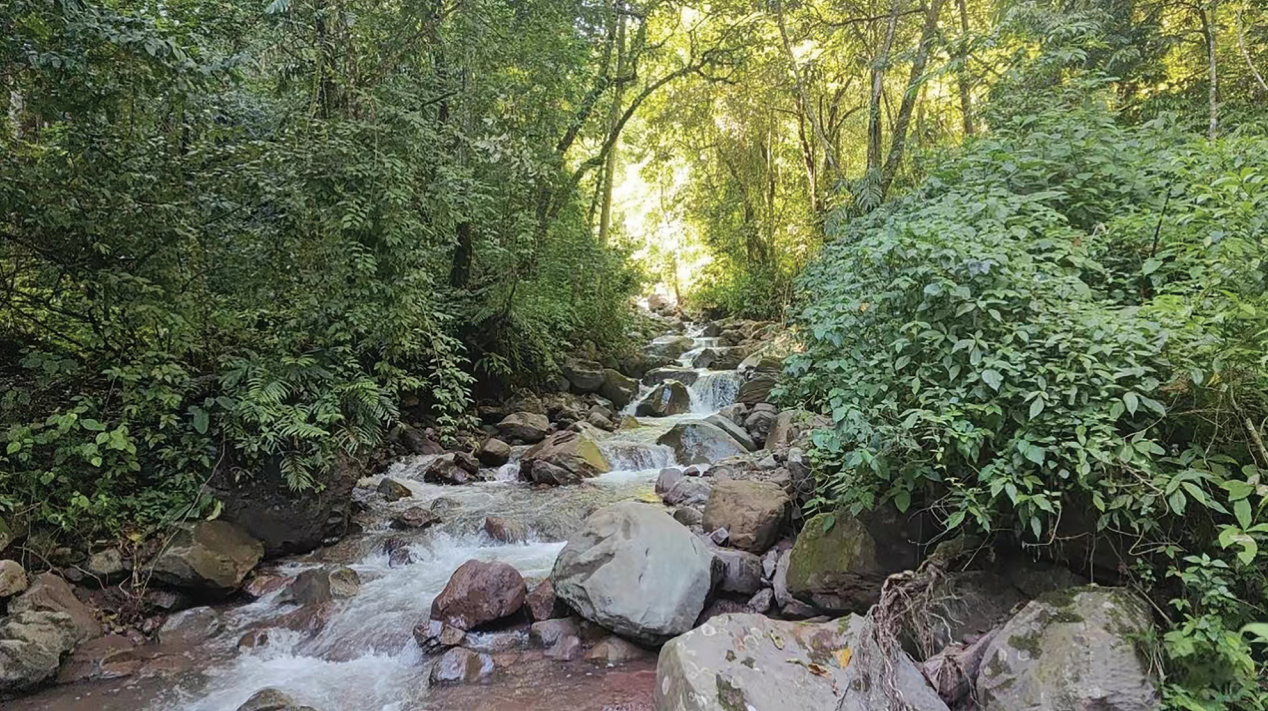
Habitat of A. truongi

== Etymology ==
The name, Amolops truongi, is a tribute to the Vietnamese zoologist Prof. Dr. Truong Quang Nguyen from the Institute of Ecology and Biological Resources.
