= Amolops spinapectoralis =

Conservation status
- Least Concern (IUCN 3.1)

Scientific classification
- Kingdom: Animalia
- Phylum: Chordata
- Class: Amphibia
- Order: Anura
- Family: Ranidae
- Genus: Amolops
- Species: A. spinapectoralis

Binomial name
- Amolops spinapectoralis Inger, Orlov, and Darevsky, 1999

Species of frog

Amolops spinapectoralis is a species of frog in the family Ranidae, the "true frogs". It is at present only known from a few locations in central Vietnam—that is, it is endemic to Vietnam—but it is likely to be found more widely in the Vietnamese Central Highlands as well as in the adjacent southeastern Laos and northeastern Cambodia. The specific name spinapectoralis is derived from Latin spina for "thorn" and pectoralis for "of the breast" and refers to the pectoral spines in adult males. Common name spinyback torrent frog has been coined for it.

== Description ==
Adult females measure 52–67 mm (2.0–2.6 in) and adult males 41–51 mm (1.6–2.0 in) in snout–vent length, although only males larger than 47 mm (1.9 in) SVL had nuptial pads in addition to vocal sacs. The overall appearance is stocky. The snout is obtusely pointed or rounded in dorsal view and rounded in profile. The tympanum is visible. The fingers are without webbing but bear truncate discs. The toes are fully webbed and have discs that are smaller than finger discs. Skin is dorsally granular, tuberculate on the sides, and smooth ventrally. The dorsum and head have large black spots surrounded by olive brown network. The iris is olive brown with fine black network. Males have conspicuous and bowed prepollex, nuptial pads consisting of about 100 white, conical spines, and an oval group of similar spines on each side of chest, as referred to in the specific name.

== Habitat and conservation ==
Amolops spinapectoralis live in montane evergreen forests at elevations of 647–1,722 m (2,123–5,650 ft) above sea level and are associated with wet, vertical rock faces adjacent to waterfalls. Its natural history is poorly known but it is likely restricted to areas near cascades and swiftly flowing streams, as with other Amolops. Reproduction probably occurs in the same streams.

This species can be very abundant locally. However, it is threatened by habitat loss and degradation caused by expanding agriculture; large areas of forest are being converted to cash crop plantations such as rubber, coffee, and tea. It is also harvested for local consumption, but it is not known whether this is a considerable threat. The species occurs in the Kon Ka Kinh National Park and Ngọc Linh Nature Reserve.
