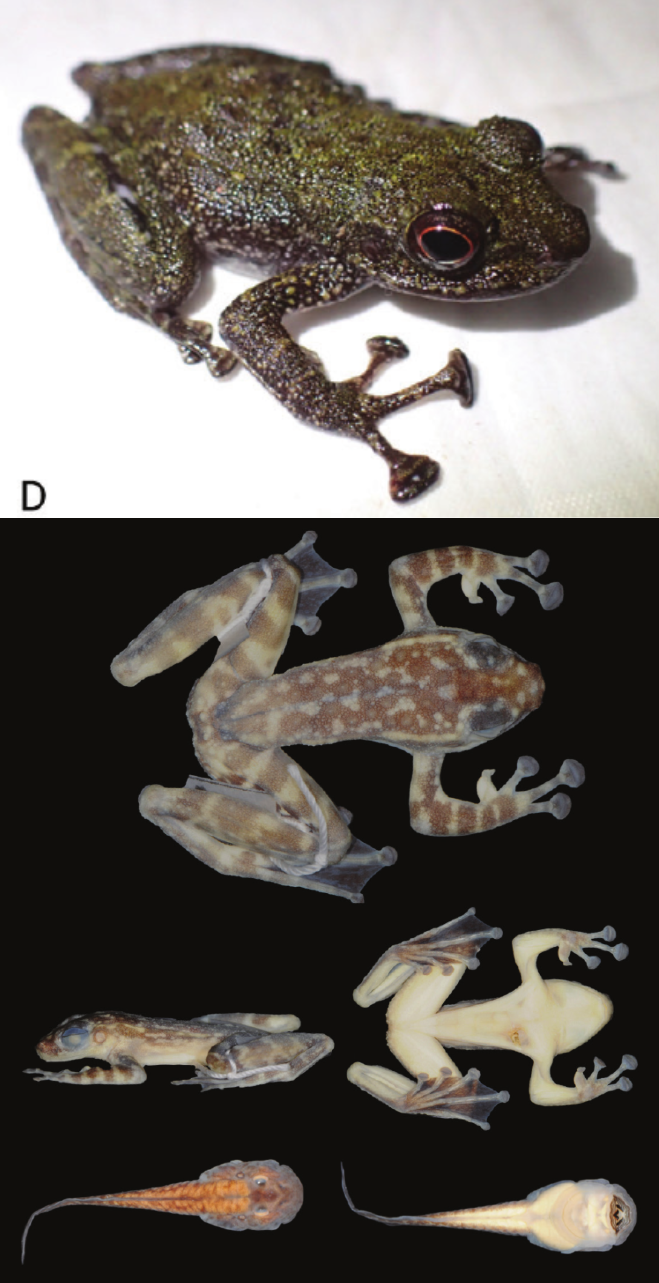
- D = In life 1 & 2 = In preservative 3 = Preserved tadpole

Scientific classification
- Kingdom: Animalia
- Phylum: Chordata
- Class: Amphibia
- Order: Anura
- Family: Ranidae
- Genus: Amolops
- Species: A. kottelati

Binomial name
- Amolops kottelati Sheridan, Phimmachak, Sivongxay, Stuart, 2023
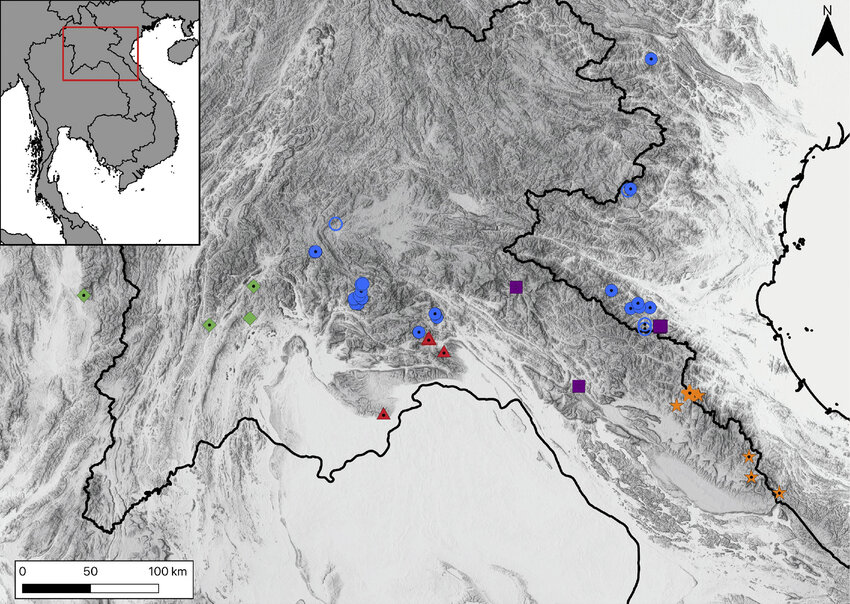
- Distribution of Amolops kottelati is shown only by the red triangles

= Amolops kottelati =

Species of amphibian

Amolops kottelati, or Kottelat's Lao torrent frog, is a species of true frog that is found in Laos.

== Description ==
The species is identified most easily by the tadpole. However, it is a somewhat brown frog with green mottling. No pictures of the ventral side exist, but it is presumably white or yellowish. 6 specimens have been collected in total, which is a small sample size. From the 2 male specimens, the SVL was 33.3–35.0 mm (1.31–1.38 in) and from the 4 female specimens, the SVL was 38.0–41.7 mm (1.50–1.64 in). It can be distinguished from similar species by the number of vomerine teeth, 3–4, as the others have 2–3. Vomerine teeth are located in the anterior part of the roof of the mouth, almost underneath the nostrils.

== Distribution and ecology ==
Amolops kottelati can be found in clear streams. Specimens have been collected at elevations of 214–987 m (702–3,238 ft). The species has only been found in the western Bolikhamxay Province and the eastern Xaysomboun Province.

== Etymology ==
Both the common and scientific name is a tribute to the ichthyologist and collector Maurice Kottelat for his contribution of essential tadpole specimens, which helped describe Amolops kottelati among others.
