= Amolops kaulbacki =

Conservation status
- Data Deficient (IUCN 3.1)

Scientific classification
- Kingdom: Animalia
- Phylum: Chordata
- Class: Amphibia
- Order: Anura
- Family: Ranidae
- Genus: Amolops
- Species: A. kaulbacki

Binomial name
- Amolops kaulbacki (Smith, 1940)

Synonyms
- Rana kaulbacki Smith, 1940

Species of frog

Amolops kaulbacki (common names: Burmese sucker frog, Kaulback's torrent frog) is a species of frog in the family Ranidae that is found in northern Myanmar and Mizoram in northeastern India. It is named after Ronald Kaulback, a British botanist and explorer who collected the type series. Very little is known about this species.
