= Amolops jaunsari =

Conservation status
- Data Deficient (IUCN 3.1)

Scientific classification
- Kingdom: Animalia
- Phylum: Chordata
- Class: Amphibia
- Order: Anura
- Family: Ranidae
- Genus: Amolops
- Species: A. jaunsari

Binomial name
- Amolops jaunsari Ray, 1992
- Amolops jaunsari is only known from near Chakrata in northern India

Species of amphibian

Amolops jaunsari, also known as the Jaunsar stream frog or Jaunsar's torrent frog, is a species of frog endemic to India. It is only known from its type locality near Chakrata in Uttarakhand (formerly Uttar Pradesh). It was described based on a single specimen collected in 1985 and has not been recorded ever since.

== Description ==
Amolops jaunsari is a relatively small species of Amolops. The head is wider than it is long. The eyes are relatively large. The tympanum is distinct and the supratympanic fold is present. The fingers have distinct terminal discs. The toe discs are similar to the fingers ones. The dorsum is dark olive green. The upper lip has light brown and lighter spots. The iris is golden brown. A blackish band runs from the eye to the sacrum. The limbs have dark and light brown crossbars. The throat and the anterior part of the breast have dark brown mottling.

== Habitat and conservation ==
Amolops jaunsari is a semi-aquatic species that occurs in small hill-streams at an elevation of about 1,062 m (3,484 ft) above sea level. The threats to this poorly-known species are unknown.
