= Amolops lifanensis =

Conservation status
- Least Concern (IUCN 3.1)

Scientific classification
- Kingdom: Animalia
- Phylum: Chordata
- Class: Amphibia
- Order: Anura
- Family: Ranidae
- Genus: Amolops
- Species: A. lifanensis

Binomial name
- Amolops lifanensis (Liu, 1945)

Species of frog

Amolops lifanensis (common names: Lifan sucker frog, Lifan torrent frog) is a species of frog in the family Ranidae that is endemic to central Sichuan, China. It is a common species within its small range, living in and along streams in forests. It is locally threatened by dam construction.
