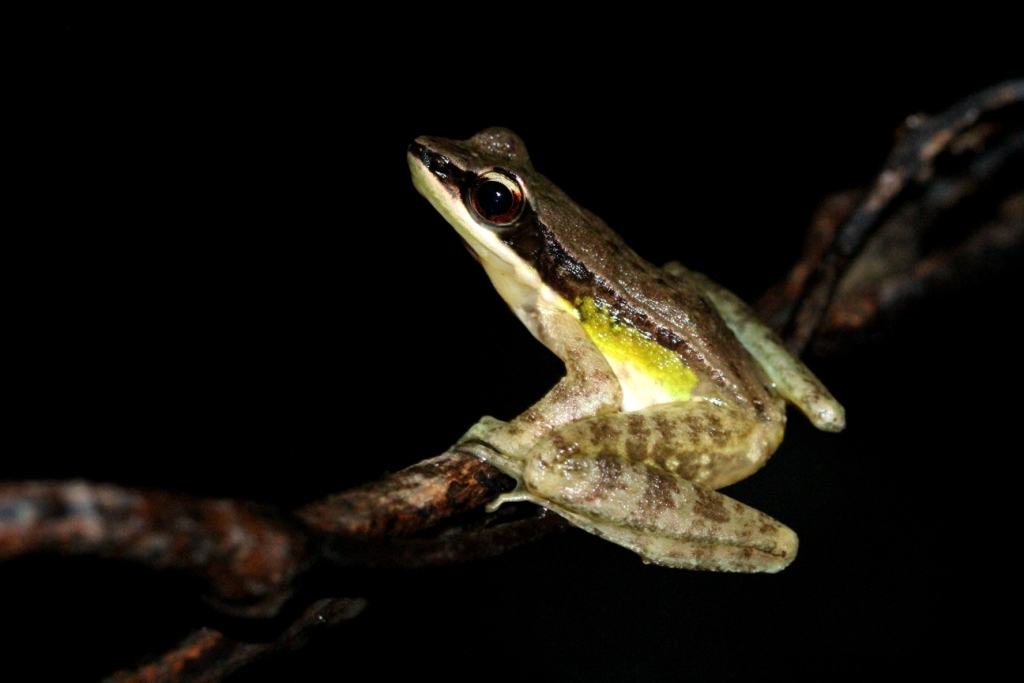

Conservation status
- Data Deficient (IUCN 3.1)

Scientific classification
- Kingdom: Animalia
- Phylum: Chordata
- Class: Amphibia
- Order: Anura
- Family: Ranidae
- Genus: Amolops
- Species: A. archotaphus

Binomial name
- Amolops archotaphus (Inger and Chan-ard, 1997)

Synonyms
- Rana archotaphus Inger and Chan-ard, 1997; Huia archotaphus (Inger and Chan-ard, 1997); Odorrana archotaphus (Inger and Chan-ard, 1997)

= Amolops archotaphus =

Doi Inthanon rock frog

Species of amphibian

Amolops archotaphus, also known as the Doi Inthanon rock frog (Doi Inthanon mountain being its type locality), is a species of frog in the family Ranidae. It is endemic to Chiang Mai Province in northwestern Thailand, although its range might extend into adjacent eastern Myanmar. Earlier records from Laos have been described as a separate species, Amolops compotrix. Amolops archotaphus itself was "hidden" as a cryptic species within the "Odorrana livida complex" until 1997, and was reassigned to Amolops in 2008.

Amolops archotaphus is known from near small waterfalls at elevations of 1,100–1,800 m (3,600–5,900 ft) above sea level. It is threatened by habitat destruction and degradation, particularly agriculture, development of infrastructure, logging and water pollution. The Doi Inthanon population is protected by the Doi Inthanon National Park.
