= Amolops jinjiangensis =

Conservation status
- Least Concern (IUCN 3.1)

Scientific classification
- Kingdom: Animalia
- Phylum: Chordata
- Class: Amphibia
- Order: Anura
- Family: Ranidae
- Genus: Amolops
- Species: A. jinjiangensis

Binomial name
- Amolops jinjiangensis Su, Yang & Li, 1986

Synonyms
- Staurois mantzorum jinjiangensis Yang, Su, and Li, 1983

Species of frog

Amolops jinjiangensis is a species of frog in the family Ranidae. It is endemic to China where it is found in Yunnan and Sichuan provinces. Amolops jinjiangensis is a common species inhabiting hill streams inside forests. It is threatened by habitat loss.
