= Amolops iriodes =

Conservation status
- Data Deficient (IUCN 3.1)

Scientific classification
- Kingdom: Animalia
- Phylum: Chordata
- Class: Amphibia
- Order: Anura
- Family: Ranidae
- Genus: Amolops
- Species: A. iriodes

Binomial name
- Amolops iriodes (Bain & Truong, 2004)

Synonyms
- Rana iriodes Bain and Truong, 2004

Species of frog

Amolops iriodes is a species of frog in the family Ranidae that is endemic to Vietnam.

Its natural habitats are subtropical or tropical moist montane forests, rivers, and intermittent freshwater marshes. It is threatened by habitat loss.
