= Amolops aniqiaoensis =

Conservation status
- Vulnerable (IUCN 3.1)

Scientific classification
- Kingdom: Animalia
- Phylum: Chordata
- Class: Amphibia
- Order: Anura
- Family: Ranidae
- Genus: Amolops
- Species: A. aniqiaoensis

Binomial name
- Amolops aniqiaoensis Dong, Rao & Lu, 2005

Species of frog

Amolops aniqiaoensis, commonly known as the Aniqiao torrent frog, is a species of frog in the family Ranidae that is endemic to China. It is only known from the vicinity of its type locality, Aniqiao (阿尼桥) in Mêdog County in the southeast of Tibet.

The habitat of Amolops aniqiaoensis is a large stream and the surrounding rocks. The site is located within the Yaluzangbudaxiagu National Nature Reserve, but IUCN considers that habitat loss and degradation due to small-scale farming is a threat to the species.
