= Amolops shuichengicus =

Conservation status
- Data Deficient (IUCN 3.1)

Scientific classification
- Kingdom: Animalia
- Phylum: Chordata
- Class: Amphibia
- Order: Anura
- Family: Ranidae
- Genus: Amolops
- Species: A. shuichengicus

Binomial name
- Amolops shuichengicus Lyu & Wang, 2019

Species of frog

Amolops shuichengicus, the Shuicheng torrent frog, is a species of true frog from China.

== Description ==
The SVL of males is 35–40 mm (1.4–1.6 in) and 49–56 mm (1.9–2.2 in) in females. The dorsal side is brown with some green spots that may increase in density further towards the head. The flanks are green with dark dots. The lateral side of the snout is black starting from the tip, going over the eye and ending by the flanks. This line has a thinner white line running under it. The limbs have dark bands. The ventral side is white with the chin and limbs being orangeish. The ventral side of the head has some dark mottling.

== Distribution and ecology ==
Amolops shuichengicus is currently only found in the Yushe Forest Park, Shuicheng County, Guizhou Province. It is found in rocky torrents. They have been found sitting on leaves above the stream. The knowledge of the distribution and ecology is extremely limited for this species.

== Etymology ==
Both the common name and the scientific name come from the type locality, Shuicheng County.
