= Amolops bellulus =

Conservation status
- Near Threatened (IUCN 3.1)

Scientific classification
- Kingdom: Animalia
- Phylum: Chordata
- Class: Amphibia
- Order: Anura
- Family: Ranidae
- Genus: Amolops
- Species: A. bellulus

Binomial name
- Amolops bellulus Liu, Yang, Ferraris & Matsui, 2000

Species of amphibian

Amolops bellulus, commonly known as the Pianma torrent frog, is a species of frog in the family Ranidae that is endemic to the Gaoligong Mountains. It is only known from the area of its type locality in Nujiang Lisu Autonomous Prefecture in Yunnan, China, but it is expected to occur in the adjacent Burmese part of the mountains. Amolops bellulus lives in and near fast-flowing mountain streams. Its status is insufficiently known.
