= Amolops longimanus =

Conservation status
- Data Deficient (IUCN 3.1)

Scientific classification
- Kingdom: Animalia
- Phylum: Chordata
- Class: Amphibia
- Order: Anura
- Family: Ranidae
- Genus: Amolops
- Species: A. longimanus

Binomial name
- Amolops longimanus (Andersson, 1939)

Species of frog

Amolops longimanus is a species of frog in the family Ranidae that is found in Myanmar and possibly China.
