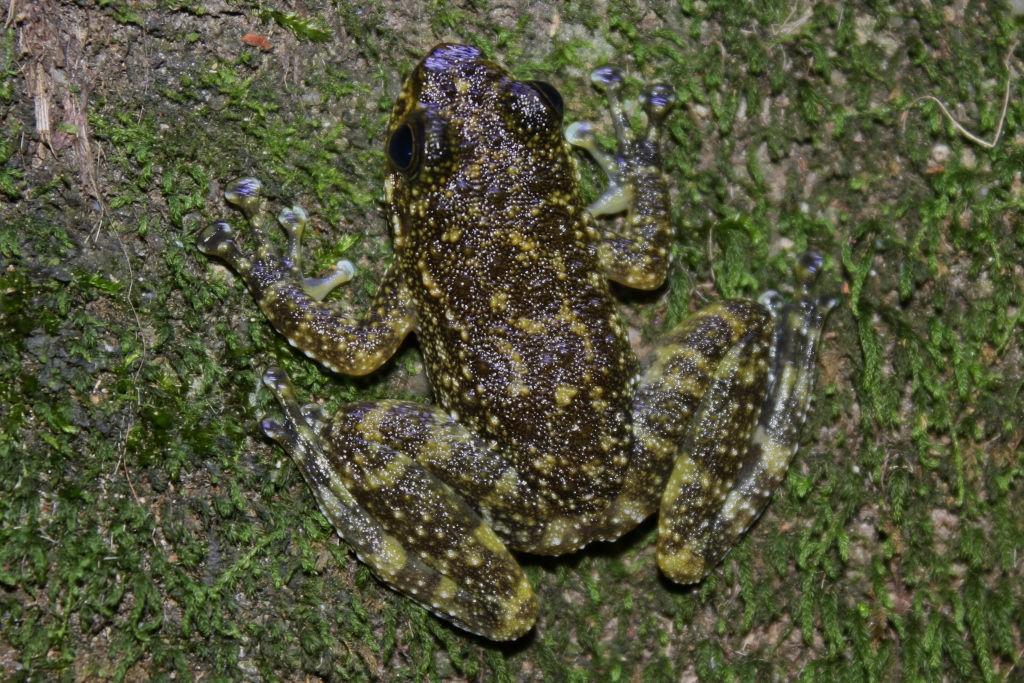

Conservation status
- Least Concern (IUCN 3.1)

Scientific classification
- Kingdom: Animalia
- Phylum: Chordata
- Class: Amphibia
- Order: Anura
- Family: Ranidae
- Genus: Amolops
- Species: A. ricketti

Binomial name
- Amolops ricketti (Boulenger, 1899)

Synonyms
- Rana ricketti Boulenger, 1899; Rhacophorus tonkinensis Ahl, 1926; Staurois ricketti ssp. minor Liu, 1950

= Amolops ricketti =

Species of frog

Amolops ricketti (Chinese sucker frog or South China torrent frog) is a species of frog in the family Ranidae that is found in southern and eastern China and northern and central montane Vietnam.

George Albert Boulenger described Amolops ricketti based on two specimens collected by Irish ornithologist John D. La Touche in Guadun village in Wuyishan, Fujian, China. The specific name honours Mr. C. B. Rickett, a British ornithologist active in China.

Amolops ricketti is a small frog, males measuring about 56 mm (2.2 in) and females about 58 mm (2.3 in) in snout-vent length. Tadpoles are about 36 mm (1.4 in) in length. Its natural habitats are subtropical or tropical moist lowland forests, subtropical or tropical moist montane forests, and rivers. It is not considered threatened by the IUCN.

Antimicrobial peptides that are candidates for developing novel anti-infection agents can be extracted from the skin secretions of Amolops ricketti.
