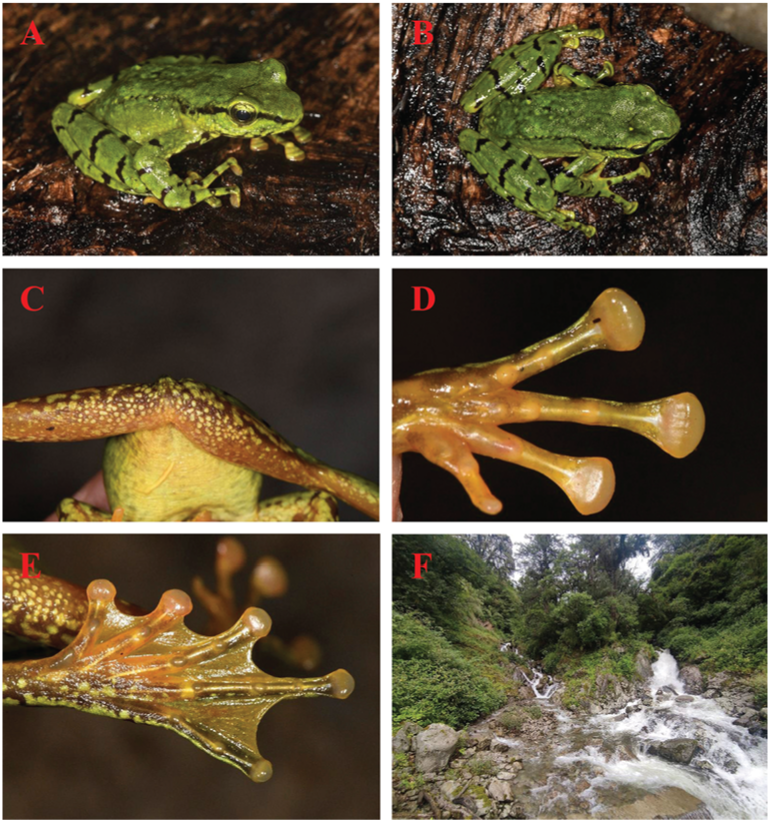

Scientific classification
- Kingdom: Animalia
- Phylum: Chordata
- Class: Amphibia
- Order: Anura
- Family: Ranidae
- Genus: Amolops
- Species: A. yangi

Binomial name
- Amolops yangi Wu, Yu, Lu, Yuan & Che, 2024
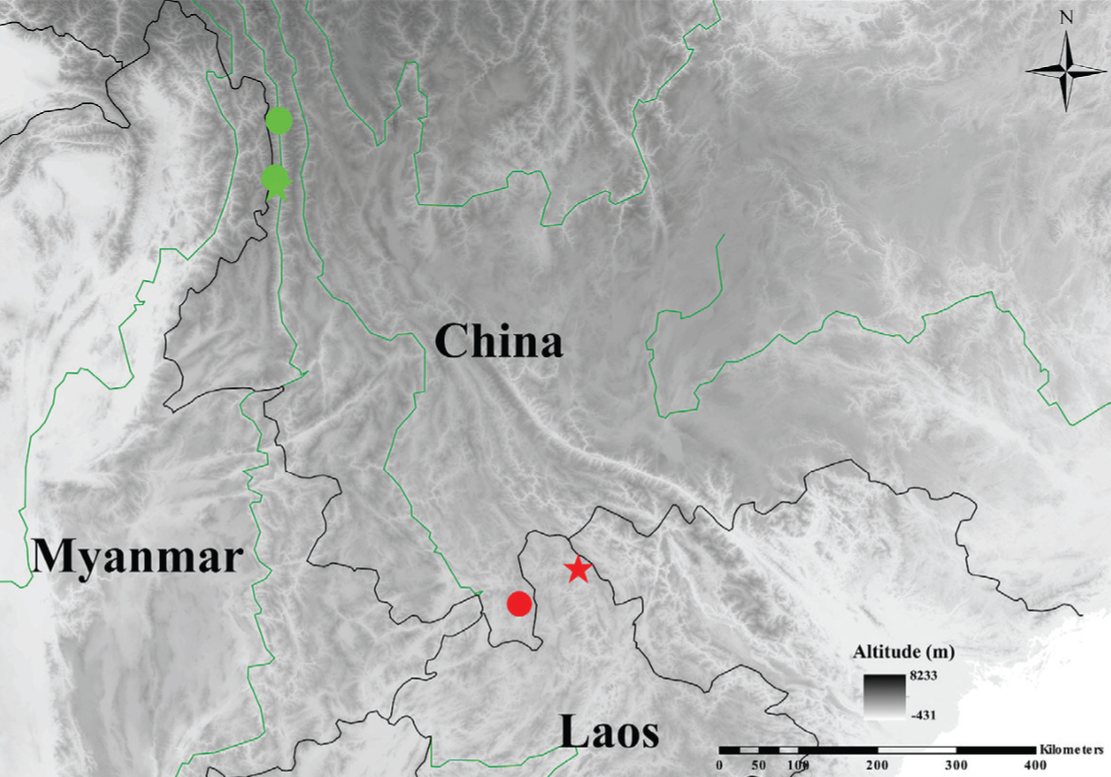
- Amolops yangi is only shown by the green dots

= Amolops yangi =

Species of frog

Amolops yangi is a species of true frog found in the Yunnan Province, China.

== Description ==
The species was described based on three specimens. The SVL of the two examined males is 46.3–51.8 mm (1.82–2.04 in) and 51.5 mm (2.03 in) in the single examined female but is likely bigger, as female frogs tend to be notably larger than males.

== Distribution and ecology ==
It is found only in Lushui County and Fugong County in the Gaoligong Mountains.

They sit approximately 0.5 m (1.6 ft) above ground level on vegetation near rocky torrents (see Figure F in taxobox). They can be found at elevations of around 2,500–3,500 m (8,200–11,500 ft).

== Etymology ==
The name A. yangi is a tribute to Prof. Da-Tong Yang from the Kunming Institute of Zoology.
