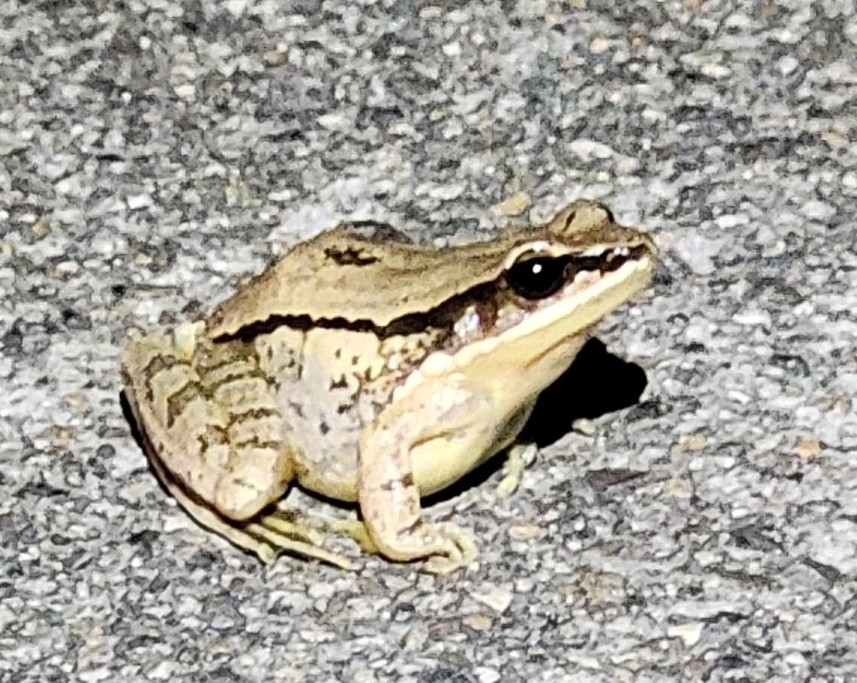

Conservation status
- Least Concern (IUCN 3.1)

Scientific classification
- Kingdom: Animalia
- Phylum: Chordata
- Class: Amphibia
- Order: Anura
- Family: Ranidae
- Genus: Amolops
- Species: A. chunganensis

Binomial name
- Amolops chunganensis (Pope, 1929)

Synonyms
- Rana (Hylorana) chunganensis Pope, 1929

= Amolops chunganensis =

Species of amphibian

Amolops chunganensis (common names: Chungan sucker frog, Chungan torrent frog) is a species of frog in the family Ranidae. Its type locality, Kuatun village (Guadun in modern spelling) in Wuyishan, Fujian. It is endemic to central, southern and eastern China where it has a wide but scattered distribution (southern Shaanxi, southern Gansu, eastern Sichuan, Guizhou, Guangxi, Hunan, and Fujian); records from Vietnam probably refer to Amolops mengyangensis.

Amolops chunganensis is a common species in suitable habitat. It is a territorial frog found in hill forests and on boulders along streams during the breeding season. It is not considered threatened by the IUCN although it is impacted by habitat destruction; it is also collected for local consumption.
