= Amolops mahabharatensis =

Conservation status
- Vulnerable (IUCN 3.1)

Scientific classification
- Kingdom: Animalia
- Phylum: Chordata
- Class: Amphibia
- Order: Anura
- Family: Ranidae
- Genus: Amolops
- Species: A. mahabharatensis

Binomial name
- Amolops mahabharatensis Khatiwada, Shu, Wang, Zhao, Xie, and Jiang, 2020

Species of frog

Amolops mahabharatensis, the Mahabharat torrent frog, is a species of frog in the family Ranidae. It is endemic to Nepal, where it has been found in the Mahabharat mountains.

== Description ==
The species shows notable sexual dimorphism. The adult female frog measures about 65.0–71.79 mm in snout-vent length and the adult male frog about 33.91–39.11 mm. This species has short front legs and long, strong hind legs. The skin of the frog's back is gray-olive in color. The iris of the eye is pale yellow or gold in color. There are dark bands on the hind legs. There are white granules on the flanks. The webbed skin on the hind feet is brown. The ventral area is white.

== Habitat ==
This frog lives in mixed forests. It perches on boulders in fast-flowing streams. Scientists have observed frog between 214 and 1800 meters above sea level.

== Young ==
At Gosner stage 32, the tadpoles were found to measure 34.8 mm long in total body length. It has a wide head and round snout. The eyes are located dorsolaterally. The tadpoles have disks on their bellies that occupy about 80% of the ventral area. The tadpoles cling to rocks in the current.

== Relationship to humans ==
People catch this frog to study, use in medicine, and eat. People also take the eggs and tadpoles to eat.

== Threats ==
The IUCN classifies this frog as vulnerable to extinction. The principal threats are habitat loss associated with agriculture, livestock grazing, and the collection of grass and firewood. Pesticides, insecticides, and introduced fish can kill this frog. Introduced plants may alter the temperature and other factors in the frog's habitat. Scientists believe overharvesting by humans may also pose some threat.
