= Amolops guangzhouensis =

Scientific classification
- Kingdom: Animalia
- Phylum: Chordata
- Class: Amphibia
- Order: Anura
- Family: Ranidae
- Genus: Amolops
- Species: A. guangzhouensis

Binomial name
- Amolops guangzhouensis Song, Wang, Qi, Lyu & Wang, 2026

Species of frog

Amolops guangzhouensis, the Guangzhou torrent frog, is a species of frog in the family Ranidae. It is endemic to Conghua in Guangzhou Province. The species was formally described in 2026 based on specimens collected from Guangzhou and Huizhou. The name was named after the province of Guangzhou, where it mostly founded.
