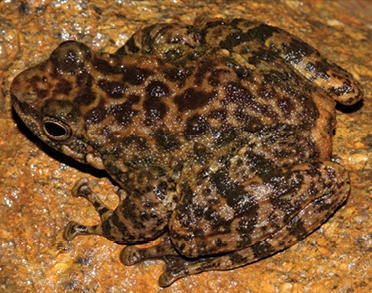
- Amolops albispinus

Conservation status
- Vulnerable (IUCN 3.1)

Scientific classification
- Kingdom: Animalia
- Phylum: Chordata
- Class: Amphibia
- Order: Anura
- Family: Ranidae
- Genus: Amolops
- Species: A. albispinus

Binomial name
- Amolops albispinus Sung, Hu, Wang, Liu & Wang, 2016

= Amolops albispinus =

Species of frog

Amolops albispinus, the white-spined cascade frog, is a species of true frog found in the Guangdong Province in China.

== Description ==
The diagnostic feature of this species is the white, cone-shaped spines on the lips, loreal region, and temporal region (except the tympanum), which are more pronounced in the male than the female. More generally, it is a greenish-brown frog with a bumpy surface. It has darker blotches on the back and dark bands on the legs. Ventrally, it is creamy white, except for the hindlimbs that are meat-colored. The SVL of males is 36.7–42.4 mm (1.44–1.67 in) and 43.1–51.9 mm (1.70–2.04 in) in females.

== Distribution and ecology ==
Amolops albispinus is found on Mt. Wutong and (rarely) Mt. Paiya (Mt. Paiya is found 30 km (19 mi) from Mt. Wutong). It has an elevation range of 60–500 m (200–1,640 ft). It lives in torrents with rocky beds and nearby broad-leafed vegetation.

== Etymology ==
Both the common and scientific name refer to the white spines on the lips, loreal region, and temporal region of this species.
