= Amolops medogensis =

Conservation status
- Endangered (IUCN 3.1)

Scientific classification
- Kingdom: Animalia
- Phylum: Chordata
- Class: Amphibia
- Order: Anura
- Family: Ranidae
- Genus: Amolops
- Species: A. medogensis

Binomial name
- Amolops medogensis Li and Rao, 2005

Species of frog

Amolops medogensis is a species of frog in the family Ranidae, the "true frogs". It is endemic to Mêdog County in southeastern Tibet. Its range might extend into the adjacent Arunachal Pradesh, India. Common name Medog torrent frog has been proposed for it.

Amolops medogensis inhabits large streams and the surrounding rocks at elevations of 700–1,820 m (2,300–5,970 ft) above sea level. Individuals have been found on rocks under waterfalls. It is a rare species. The population is considered stable, but it is strongly threatened by Yarang Dam in part of its range. In addition, habitat loss and degradation caused by smallholder farming is a minor threat. The entire known range is within the Yaluzangbudaxiagu National Nature Reserve.
