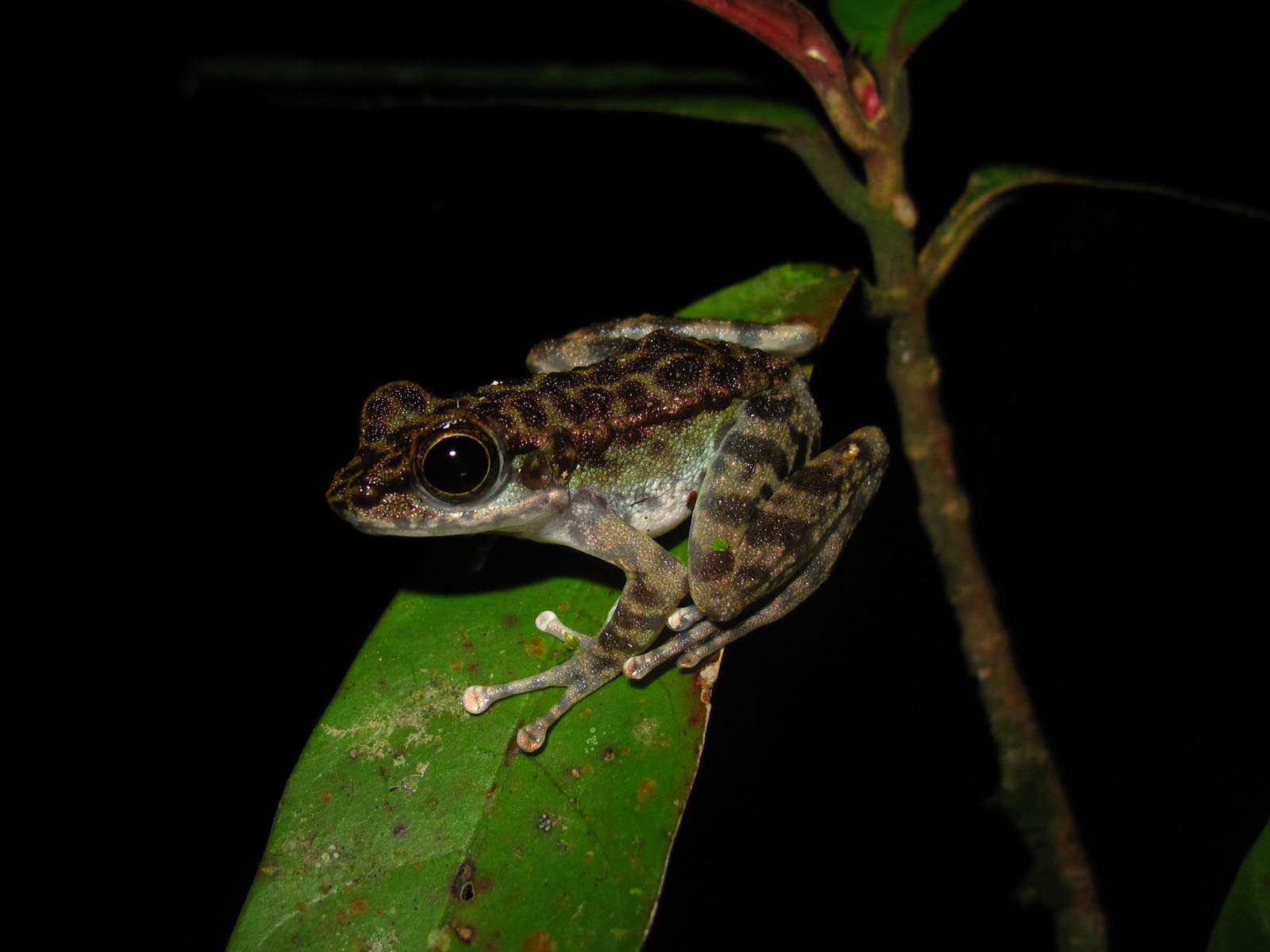
- Amolops panhai

Scientific classification
- Kingdom: Animalia
- Phylum: Chordata
- Class: Amphibia
- Order: Anura
- Family: Ranidae
- Genus: Amolops; Cope, 1865

Species
- Many, see text

Synonyms
- Amo Dubois, 1992; Aemolops Cope, 1865

= Amolops =

Cascade frogs

Genus of amphibians

Amolops (commonly known as cascade frogs or sucker frogs) is a genus of true frogs (family Ranidae) native mainly to eastern and south-eastern Asia. These frogs are closely related to such genera as Huia, Meristogenys, Odorrana, Pelophylax and Rana, but still form a distinct lineage among the core radiation of true frogs. They are commonly known as "torrent frogs" after their favorite habitat - small rapid-flowing mountain and hill streams - but this name is used for many similar-looking frogs regardless of whether they are loosely related.

Several species are highly convergent with other Ranidae "torrent frogs". A. archotaphus and its relatives for example very much resemble Odorrana livida. In another incidence of convergent evolution yielding adaptation to habitat, the tadpoles of Amolops, Huia, Meristogenys as well as Rana sauteri have a raised and usually well-developed sucker on their belly. This is useful in keeping in place in rocky torrents, where these frogs grow up. But as Odorrana and Staurois from comparable habitat prove, this sucker is by no means a necessity and other means of adaptation to torrent habitat exist.

== Species ==
The delimitation of this genus has proven complicated, with many species believed to belong elsewhere. Due to the degree of convergent evolution, DNA sequence studies are very helpful in assigning species to the genera, though the possibility of past hybridization cannot be discounted in Ranidae.

New species are described on a regular basis. At least one undescribed species is known to exist, a very distinct form from Phetchaburi in Thailand that is possibly closer to A. marmoratus than to most others.

- Amolops afghanus Günther, 1858
- Amolops ailao Tang et al., 2023
- Amolops akhaorum Stuart, Bain, Phimmachak, and Spence, 2010
- Amolops albispinus Sung, Hu, Wang, Liu, and Wang, 2016
- Amolops aniqiaoensis Dong, Rao, and Lü, 2005
- Amolops archotaphus Inger and Chan-ard, 1997
- Amolops assamensis Sengupta et al., 2008
- Amolops attiguus Sheridan, Phimmachak, Sivongxay, Stuart, 2023
- Amolops australis Chan, Abraham, Grismer, and Grismer, 2018
- Amolops bellulus Liu, Yang, Ferraris, and Matsui, 2000
- Amolops chakrataensis Ray, 1992
- Amolops chayuensis Sun, Luo, Sun, and Zhang, 2013
- Amolops chunganensis Pope, 1929
- Amolops compotrix Bain, Stuart, and Orlov, 2006
- Amolops cremnobatus Inger and Kottelat, 1998
- Amolops cucae Bain, Stuart, and Orlov, 2006
- Amolops dafangensis Li et al., 2024
- Amolops daiyunensis Liu & Hu, 1975
- Amolops daorum Bain, Lathrop, Murphy, Orlov, and Ho, 2003
- Amolops formosus Günther, 1876
- Amolops gerbillus Annandale, 1912
- Amolops gerutu Chan, Abraham, Grismer, and Grismer, 2018
- Amolops granulosus Liu and Hu, 1961
- Amolops guangzhouensis Song, Wang, Qi, Lyu and Wang, 2026
- Amolops hainanensis Boulenger, 1900
- Amolops himalayanus Boulenger, 1888
- Amolops hongkongensis Pope and Romer, 1951 – Hong Kong cascade frog
- Amolops indoburmanensis Dever, Fuiten, Konu, and Wilkinson, 2012
- Amolops iriodes Bain and Nguyen, 2004
- Amolops jaunsari Ray, 1992
- Amolops jinjiangensis Su, Yang, and Li, 1986
- Amolops kaulbacki Smith, 1940
- Amolops kohimaensis Biju, Mahony, and Kamei, 2010
- Amolops kottelati Sheridan, Phimmachak, Sivongxay, & Stuart, 2023
- Amolops larutensis Boulenger, 1899
- Amolops lifanensis Liu, 1945
- Amolops loloensis Liu, 1950
- Amolops longimanus Andersson, 1939
- Amolops mahabharatensis Khatiwada, Shu, Wang, Zhao, Xie, and Jiang, 2020
- Amolops mantzorum David, 1872
- Amolops marmoratus Blyth, 1855
- Amolops medogensis Li and Rao, 2005
- Amolops mengdingensis Yu, Wu, and Yang, 2019
- Amolops mengyangensis Wu and Tian, 1995
- Amolops minhlei Pham, Hoang, Nguyen, Nguyen, Nguyen, Nguyen, Thai, Hoang & Pham, 2026
- Amolops minutus Orlov and Ho, 2007
- Amolops monticola Anderson, 1871
- Amolops nidorbellus Biju, Mahony, and Kamei, 2010
- Amolops nyingchiensis Jiang, Wang, Xie, Jiang, and Che, 2016
- Amolops ottorum Pham, Sung, Pham, Le, Ziegler, and Nguyen, 2019
- Amolops pallasitatus Qi, Zhou, Lyu, Lu, and Li, 2019
- Amolops panhai Matsui & Nabhitabhata, 2006
- Amolops putaoensis Gan et al., 2020
- Amolops ricketti Boulenger, 1899
- Amolops senchalensis Chanda, 1987
- Amolops sengae Sheridan, Phimmachak, Sivongxay, & Stuart, 2023
- Amolops shihaitaoi Wang, Li, Du, Hou, & Yu, 2022
- Amolops shillong Saikia et al., 2025
- Amolops shuichengicus Lyu and Wang, 2019
- Amolops siju Saikia et al., 2023
- Amolops sinensis Lyu, Wang, and Wang, 2019
- Amolops spinapectoralis Inger, Orlov, and Darevsky, 1999
- Amolops splendissimus Orlov and Ho, 2007
- Amolops tanfuilianae Sheridan, Phimmachak, Sivongxay, & Stuart, 2023
- Amolops teochew Zeng, Wang, Lyu & Wang, 2021
- Amolops terraorchis Saikia et al., 2022
- Amolops torrentis Smith, 1923
- Amolops truongi Pham et al., 2023
- Amolops tuanjieensis Gan et al., 2020
- Amolops tuberodepressus Liu and Yang, 2000
- Amolops viridimaculatus Jiang, 1983
- Amolops vitreus Bain, Stuart, and Orlov, 2006
- Amolops wangyali Mahony, Nidup, Streicher, Teeling & Kamei, 2022
- Amolops wenshanensis Yuan, Jin, Li, Stuart, and Wu, 2018
- Amolops wuyiensis Liu and Hu, 1975
- Amolops xinduqiao Fei, Ye, Wang, and Jiang, 2017
- Amolops yangi Wu et al., 2024
- Amolops yatseni Lyu, Wang, and Wang, 2019
- Amolops yunkaiensis Lyu, Wang, Liu, Zeng, and Wang, 2018
