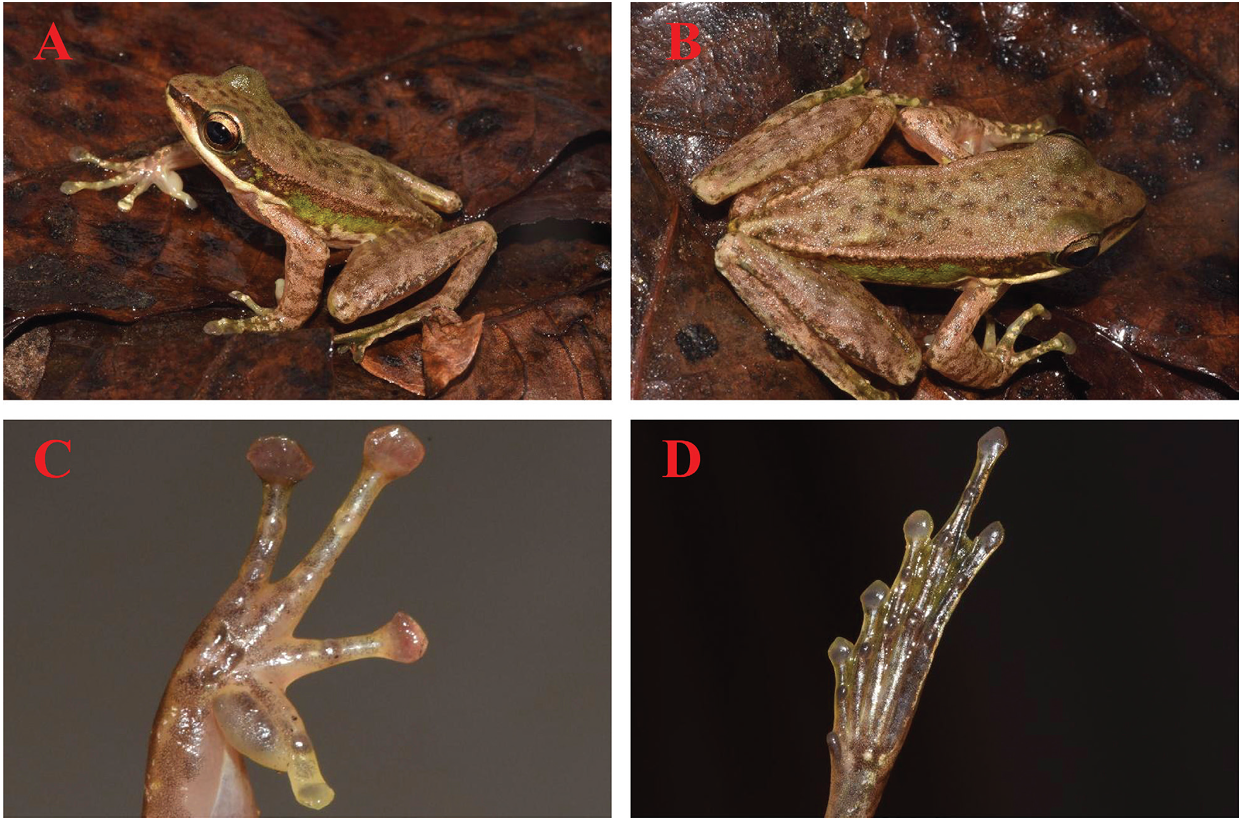

Conservation status
- Vulnerable (IUCN 3.1)

Scientific classification
- Kingdom: Animalia
- Phylum: Chordata
- Class: Amphibia
- Order: Anura
- Family: Ranidae
- Genus: Amolops
- Species: A. vitreus

Binomial name
- Amolops vitreus (Bain, Stuart and Orlov, 2006)

Synonyms
- Rana vitrae Bain, Stuart, and Orlov, 2006; Odorrana vitrea (Bain, Stuart and Orlov, 2006)

= Amolops vitreus =

Species of frog

Amolops vitreus, the vitreous cascade frog, is a species of true frog from Laos, Vietnam, and China. It also has the common name glass torrent frog.

== Distribution and ecology ==
This species was originally described in Phongsaly Province, Laos, but was later found in Vietnam (2015) and then in Yunnan Province, China (2024). Males have an SVL of 38–44 mm (1.5–1.7 in) and around 59 mm (2.3 in) in females. They have been found at elevations of 600–1,465 m (1,970–4,810 ft). They can be found near streams and hiding in nearby foliage.

== Etymology ==
All three names mean glassy (from Latin; vitrum (glass) and English; vitreous (glassy)). This is because the skin on the belly is somewhat transparent.
