= Amolops viridimaculatus =

Conservation status
- Least Concern (IUCN 3.1)

Scientific classification
- Kingdom: Animalia
- Phylum: Chordata
- Class: Amphibia
- Order: Anura
- Family: Ranidae
- Genus: Amolops
- Species: A. viridimaculatus

Binomial name
- Amolops viridimaculatus (Jiang, 1983)

Synonyms
- Staurois viridimaculatus Jiang, 1983

Species of frog

Amolops viridimaculatus, also known as green-spotted torrent frog, Dahaoping sucker frog, and Dahaoping cascade frog, is a species of frog found in Yunnan, China, northern Vietnam, northern Myanmar, and Nagaland, Northeast India; it is also expected to occur in northern Laos.

Male frogs measure 75 mm (3.0 in) and females 88 mm (3.5 in) in length.

A. viridimaculatus is becoming rare due to habitat loss caused by small-scale agriculture and dam development.
