= Amolops shillong =

Scientific classification
- Kingdom: Animalia
- Phylum: Chordata
- Class: Amphibia
- Order: Anura
- Family: Ranidae
- Genus: Amolops
- Species: A. shillong

Binomial name
- Amolops shillong Bhaskar Saikia, Bikramjit Sinha, A. Shabnam, Eugene Lyngkhoi, Damepaia S. M. Pdah and Dinesh, 2025

Species of frog

Amolops shillong is a species of cascade-dwelling frog of genus, Amolops. A. shillong is found within the urban landscape of Shillong, the capital city of Meghalaya in Northeast India. This species is differentiated from other species based on a distinct set of morphological characters and its isolated geographical space.
