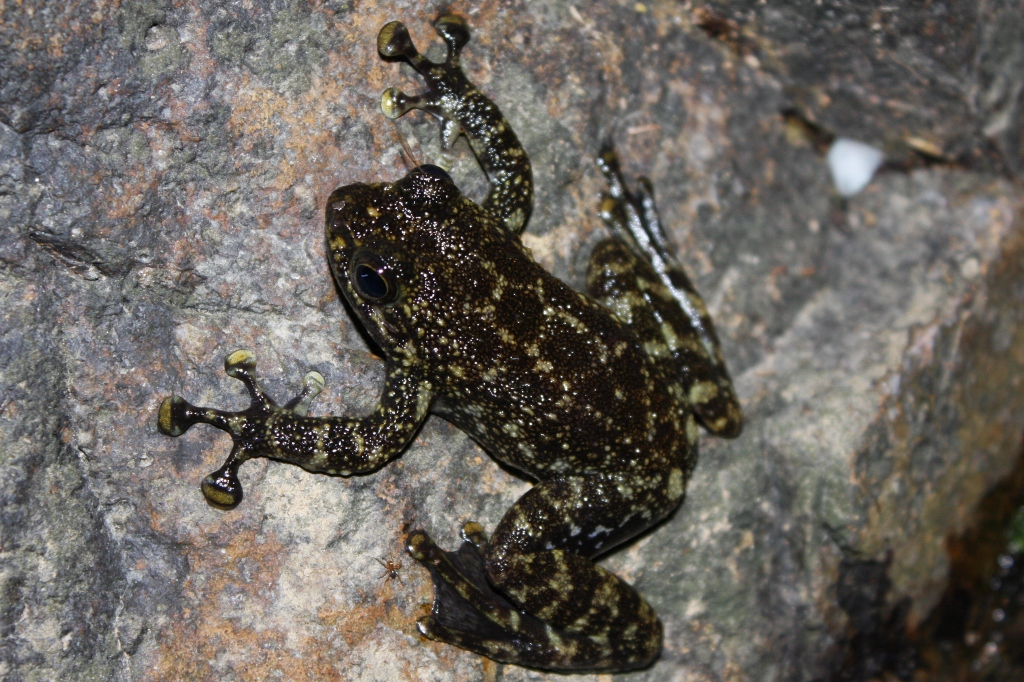

Conservation status
- Endangered (IUCN 3.1)

Scientific classification
- Kingdom: Animalia
- Phylum: Chordata
- Class: Amphibia
- Order: Anura
- Family: Ranidae
- Genus: Amolops
- Species: A. hongkongensis

Binomial name
- Amolops hongkongensis (Pope and Romer, 1951)

Synonyms
- Staurois hongkongensis Pope and Romer, 1951

= Hong Kong cascade frog =

Species of amphibian

Hong Kong cascade frog or Hong Kong torrent frog (Amolops hongkongensis) is a species of true frog from southern coastal China, once thought to be endemic to Hong Kong. Their eggs are laid on rock faces in the splash zones of cascades. In Hong Kong, it is a protected species under Wild Animals Protection Ordinance Cap 170.

== Distribution and habitat ==
Originally described from Tai Mo Shan in Hong Kong, populations are now also known from Guangdong. In Hong Kong, the species is found in the New Territories and on Hong Kong Island. It was found in rather small streams in Lung Fu Shan.

Amolops hongkongensis inhabit forest-fringed, small hill streams, particularly those with cascades. Tadpoles have a ventral sucker helping them to maintain their position in the stream. Its habitat is threatened by silviculture, clear-cutting, and dam and other infrastructure construction.

== Description ==
Both male and female Amolops hongkongensis grow to a snout–vent length of 40 mm (1.6 in). Tadpoles are up to 25 mm (0.98 in) in length. The diameter of its suction discs is 3-4 times the width of the fingers. It contains the tarsal fold and has white velvety nuptial pads on the first fingers.

== Gallery ==
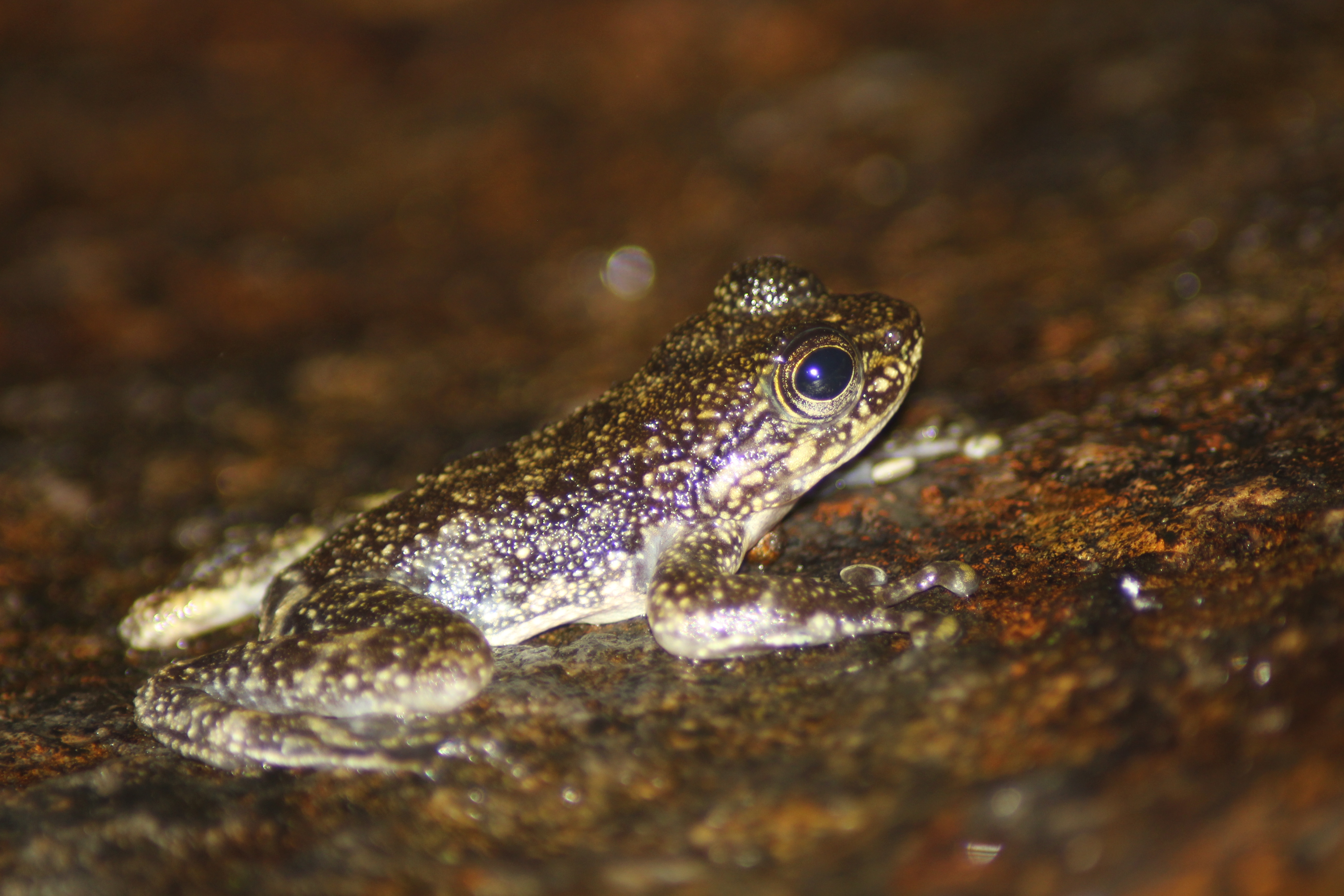
Hong Kong cascade frog (Amolops hongkongensis)

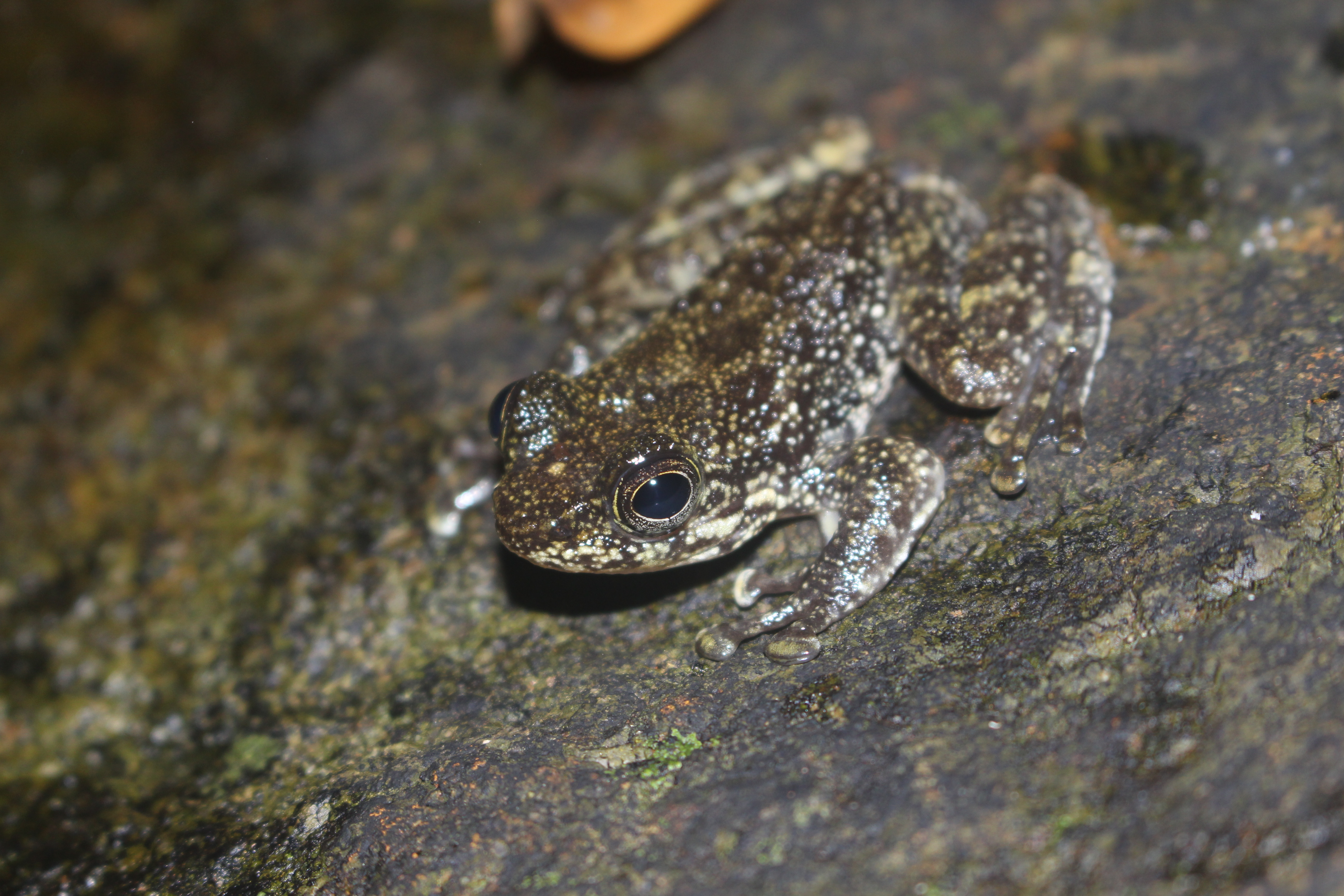
Hong Kong cascade frog (Amolops hongkongensis)

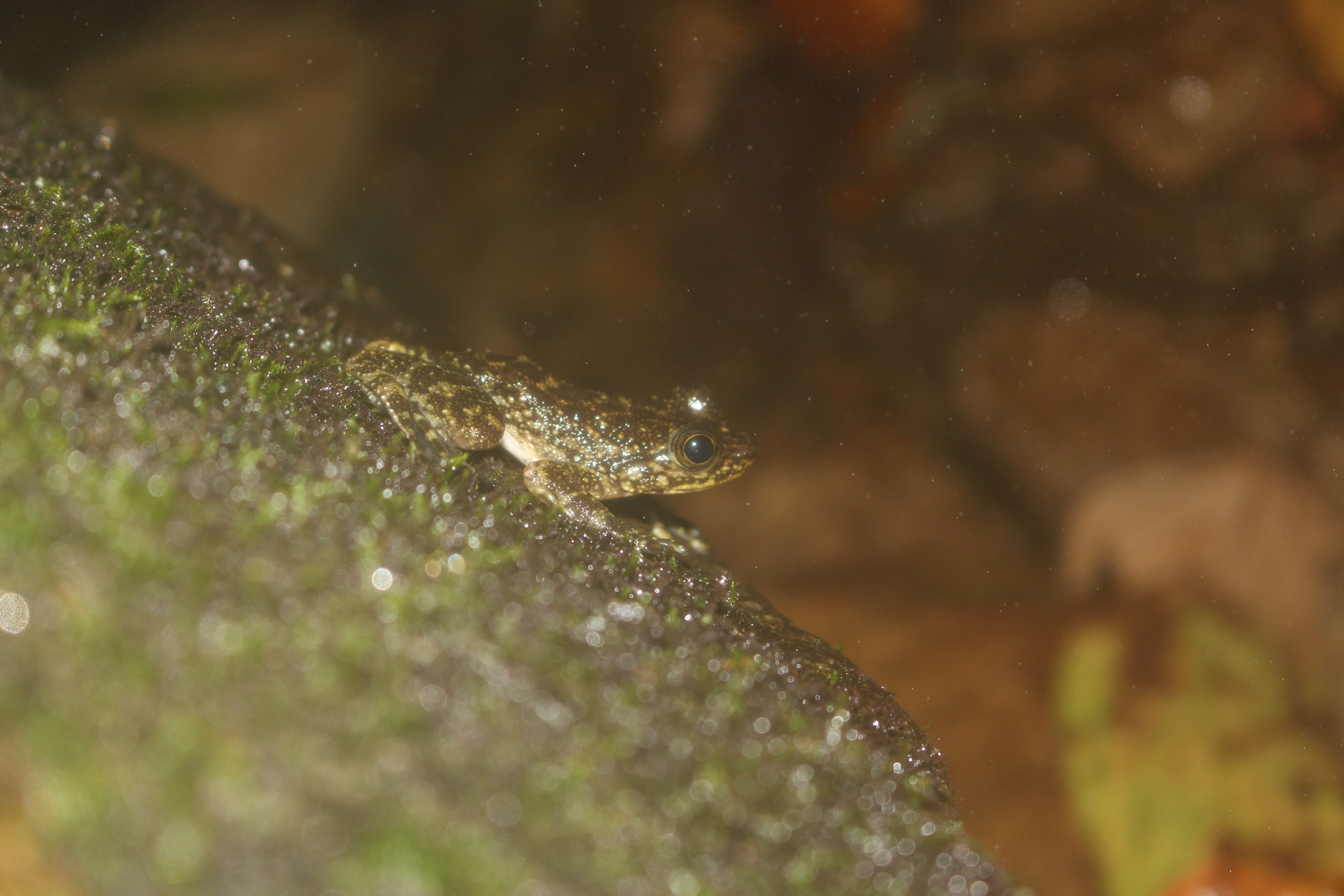
Hong Kong cascade frog (Amolops hongkongensis)
