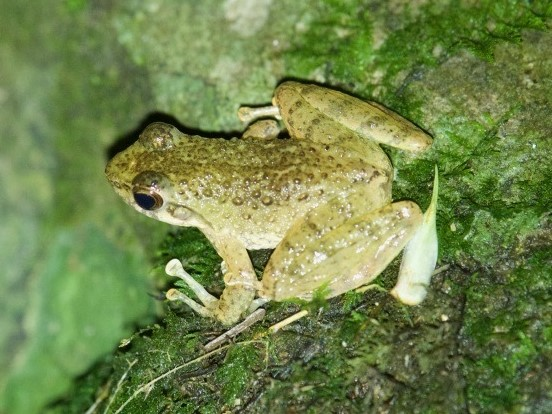

Conservation status
- Vulnerable (IUCN 3.1)

Scientific classification
- Kingdom: Animalia
- Phylum: Chordata
- Class: Amphibia
- Order: Anura
- Family: Ranidae
- Genus: Amolops
- Species: A. torrentis

Binomial name
- Amolops torrentis (Smith, 1923)

Synonyms
- Micrixalus torrentis Smith, 1923

= Amolops torrentis =

Species of frog

Amolops torrentis, commonly known as the torrent sucker frog or the little torrent frog, is a species of frog in the family Ranidae and genus Amolops that is endemic to China, specifically only on the island of Hainan. They are most likely to be found in streams and surrounding wetland areas. Males have high-pitched mating calls, which are favored by females. Glands on this species' skin can secrete toxins. This species suffers from parasitism and habitat loss. Currently it is listed as vulnerable by the IUCN and is protected by law in China.

== Taxonomy ==
A. torrentis is within the A. hainanensis group. It is a sister taxon to both A. hainanensis and A. daiyunnensis.

== Description ==
A. torrentis contains multiple characteristics that distinguish it from other members of the Amolops genus that also exist in China and southeast Asia. One of these differentiating characteristics is that A. torrentis has tarsal glands. A. torrentis also has a distinct tympanum edge and a tibio-tarsal articulation reaching beyond the snout when the back limbs are adpressed. Individuals of this species also have a distinct glandular ridge (also known as a dorsolateral fold of skin) under the tarsus and smooth bumps on the back, along with a circummarginal groove at the tip of the first finger. Males of the species also possess a pair of subgular vocal sacs that are of white color. A. torrentis has sexual size dimorphism, with females of the species tending to be larger than males of the species (adult females have snout-ventral lengths of less than 42 mm, while adult males have snout-ventral lengths of less than 35 mm). The tadpoles of the species grow up to 35 mm in length. The tadpoles have a divided upper jaw sheath with 5/3 labial tooth rows. The tadpoles also have ventral glands.

== Distribution and habitat ==
A. torrentis has only been found on Hainan island in China, in locations that range from 80 to 1000 meters in elevation. For example, A. torrentis has been found in the Limushan nature reserve on Hainan island. While its presence has been reported in the Guangdong province of mainland China, these sightings have been disproven. The frogs observed in Guangdong have since been reclassified into a different but related Amolops species.

A. torrentis lives in medium and large streams as well as the surrounding wetland area. They are called torrent frogs because of their proximity to fast-flowing water and the background noise this presents. During the day, individuals of this species usually crouch on rocks near the stream rapids or on stone walls near the waterfalls. Occasionally, they stay in the water for brief periods of time and then float on the water surface. At night, individuals of A. torrentis can be found on rocks near the streams or on leaves of nearby shrubbery and weeds.

== Reproduction ==
Females of A. torrentis lay eggs at rocky and fast flowing sites in the stream, specifically in holes or openings in the rock piles where the follicles can be anchored to the stones or to nearby soils to prevent the eggs from being washed away. Tadpoles also inhabit similar locations.

== Mating ==
=== Male calling ===
Mating in this species occurs via calling, as calls are transmitted across and around streams. The call sounds like a sharp and high "squeak, squeak, squeak" as males produce calls that consist of a series of identical repeated notes throughout the day and night during breeding season.

Males of this species change their call frequency in response to noise but not their call intensity or amplitude. Researchers investigating this utilized recordings of stream noise to determine how stream noise changes characteristics of male calling. The lack of an increase in call amplitude with increased background noise is a contradiction to the Lombard hypothesis, which states that animals are expected to increase both their call frequency and their call amplitude in response to noise in the environment. The calling behavior of A. torrentis instead supports the theory that calling with a higher frequency helps prevent their calls from being lost in the background noise. This may be due to the fact that stream noise (the primary background noise for these frogs) is mainly in lower frequency ranges, so the upward shift in call frequency could be more adaptive than increasing the lowest frequencies. Males of this species prefer to call from stones in the river that have the same background color as the frog's body and different than the white color of the vocal sac, so vocal-sac inflation is conspicuous in the environment.

=== Female preference ===
Females of A. torrentis prefer higher-frequency calls over lower-frequency calls regardless of background noise levels. In addition, females prefer calls with high amplitude noise added over calls with low amplitude stream noise added, but stream/background noise is not attractive to females by itself. This may indicate that stream noise could be used as a cue by females to enhance the attractiveness of calls, as river noise would be associated with the rocks and vegetation of the habitat of A. torrentis, and thus help provide information for where best to lay eggs.

However, females of this species likely do not rely only on auditory cues in choosing a partner to mate with. Researchers have found that both auditory cues (male calling) and visual cues (in the form of male vocal-sac inflation) were attractive to female A. torrentis, but the auditory cues were more attractive than visual cues.

== Physiology ==
=== Hearing ===
Frogs of this species rely on hearing in order to hear the calls that the males produce. The best hearing range for females is 1.6–2 kHz in frequency, and females also prefer higher frequency calls over lower frequency calls regardless of ambient noise levels in the background. However, the dominant frequency of the calls given by the males is higher in frequency, around 4.3 kHz. This mismatch is a contradiction to the matched filter hypothesis, which states that the auditory sensitivity/range of animal calls and the actual spectral character/frequency of the calls will match to make courtship calling most efficient. This contradiction offers support to the hypothesis that A. torrentis evolved from frogs that did not live near a stream and thus the high-frequency calls evolved in the species due to the selection pressure of noise from nearby streams.

The hearing of individuals of this species is also partially temperature dependent. Measures of auditory brainstem responses to determine auditory sensitivity have shown that both the auditory thresholds are higher and the latencies are longer at colder temperatures as compared to warmer temperatures for calls made at lower frequencies, but this difference in auditory sensitivity due to temperature was not found for higher frequency calls. This temperature-dependent change in auditory sensitivity indicates that while temperature changes can change auditory sensitivity around the best hearing range for females (lower frequency), they do not impact auditory sensitivity around the female-preferred frequency range (higher frequencies). Thus, these temperature-dependent changes might be adaptive for reproductive behavior in this species.

=== Glands and toxins ===
Bradykinin-related proteins (BRPs) have been isolated from the skin of individuals of A. torrentis. Bradykinin is a powerful endothelium-dependent vasodilator that induces a drop in blood pressure, and the contraction of the bronchi and smooth muscles in the ileum. Isolated BRPs from A. torrentis have been shown to have a contractive effect on the smooth muscle of rat ileum in the laboratory setting. BRPs are thought to play a role in defense against predators, as the contraction in the ileum may stimulate the gastrointestinal system of a predator to cause vomiting and other unpleasant reactions. This deters the predator from consuming members of A. torrentis again.

== Threats ==
=== Parasites ===
Individuals of these species suffer from parasitism from blood-sucking parasites like frog-biting midges. These midges are attracted to the acoustic signal given by male members of A. torrentis, which results in limb movements to defend against these parasites. The limb movements include toe trembling, hind foot lifting, arm waving, limb shaking, wiping, leg stretching, and foot flagging. These movements may also be incorporated into a sexual display, as males that display these parasite defensive limb movements are perceived as more attractive by female members of the species.

This species also suffers from parasitism from nematodes. Nematodes from the family Acuariidae have been found as stomach cysts in museum samples from this species.

== Conservation ==
A. torrentis is listed as vulnerable by the IUCN, as last assessed in 2019. It was given this classification because its area range is only 15,838 km^2 in Hainan. Its habitat in Hainan is declining in terms of the extent and quality. Identified threats to the species include annual and perennial non-wood crops, wood and pulp plantations, logging and wood harvesting, dams and water management, and agricultural and forestry effluents. Previously, it had been a concern that the construction of hydroelectric plants in Hainan would pose a threat to A. torrentis. However, this concern has been alleviated by the fact that the construction of these plants has occurred and no new plants are planned, and no major damage to the species population has been observed.

=== Habitat Loss ===
In particular, an increase in the number of rubber plantations, banana plantations, and areca crops are decreasing the size of the forest habitat for A. torrentis. This also polluting the habitat with herbicides and pesticides. Such habitat loss is particularly concerning because A. torrentis is only found on the island of Hainan.

=== Conservation Efforts ===
To combat the threat of habitat loss, A. torrentis is present in several protected areas in Hainan, including nature reserves and forest parks. In addition, it is also on the "List of Beneficial or of Important Economic or Scientific Value Terrestrial Wild Animals under States Protection", which is under the protection of the "Law of the People's Republic of China on the Protection of Wildlife". Its inclusion in these lists provide a degree of protection to the species through illegalizing their collection.
