= Amolops minhlei =

Scientific classification
- Kingdom: Animalia
- Phylum: Chordata
- Class: Amphibia
- Order: Anura
- Family: Ranidae
- Genus: Amolops
- Species: A. minhlei

Binomial name
- Amolops minhlei Pham, Hoang, Nguyen, Nguyen, Nguyen, Nguyen, Thai, Hoang & Pham, 2026

Species of frog

Amolops minhlei, (Vietnamese: Ếch bám đá minh), commonly known as Minh's torrent frog, is a species of frog in the family of Ranidae. It was described in 2026 from Vũ Quang National Park in Vietnam.

== Taxonomy ==
The species was described by Anh Van Pham, Chung Van Hoang, Truong Quang Nguyen, and several other people in 2026. It belongs to the Amolops monticola species group.
