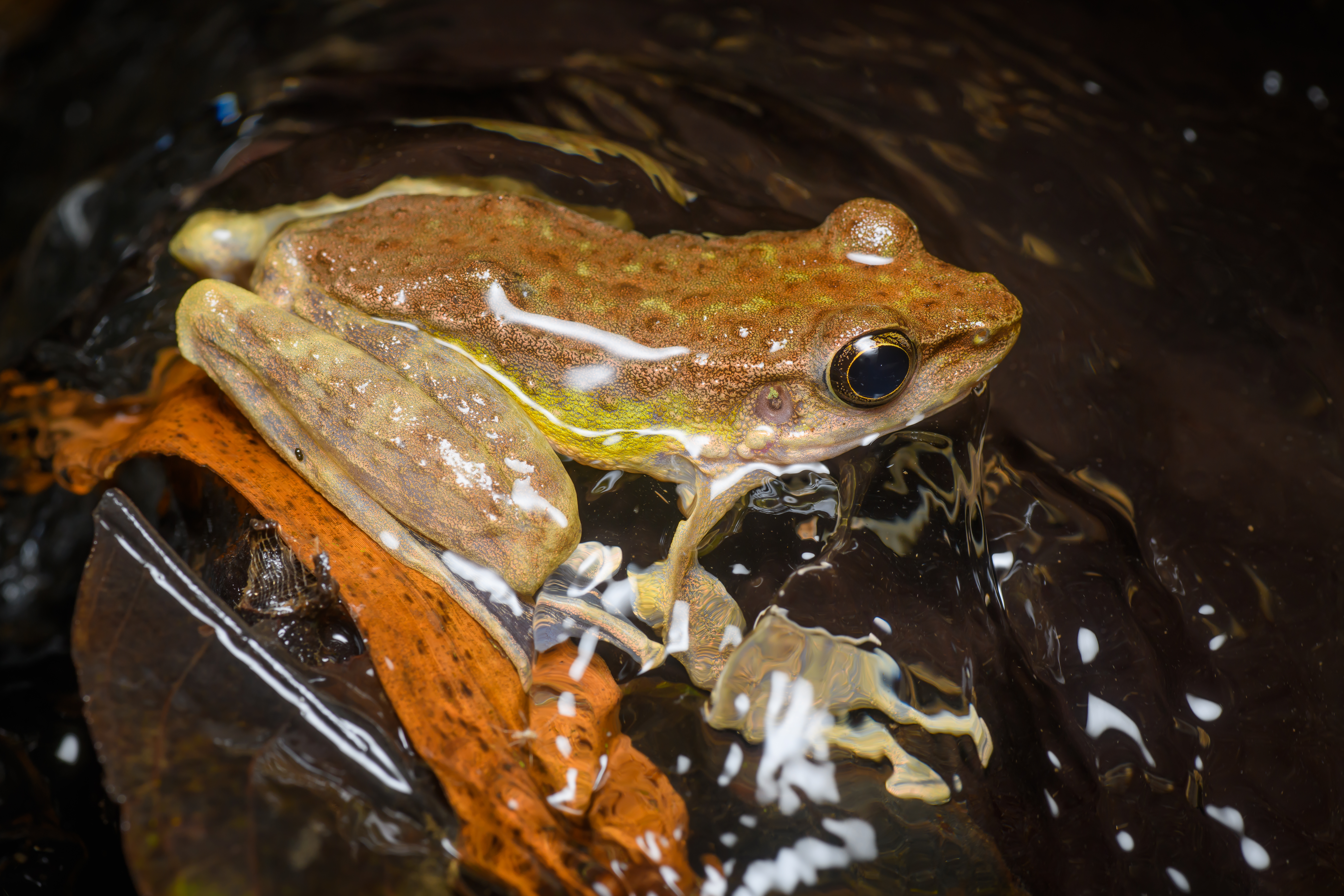

Conservation status
- Least Concern (IUCN 3.1)

Scientific classification
- Kingdom: Animalia
- Phylum: Chordata
- Class: Amphibia
- Order: Anura
- Family: Ranidae
- Genus: Amolops
- Species: A. panhai

Binomial name
- Amolops panhai Matsui & Nabhitabhata, 2006

= Amolops panhai =

Species of amphibian

Amolops panhai, commonly known as the peninsular torrentfrog, is a species of true frog that can be found in western and peninsular Thailand and in eastern Myanmar. It is associated with streams and waterfalls in moist lowland forests.

Its common name in Thai are Marbled Tenasserim Frog (กบลายหินตะนาวศรี) and Panha's Marbled Frog (กบลายหินปัญหา).

The specific name honours Thai herpetologist, invertebrate biologist and malacologist Prof. Dr. Somsak Panha, professor of Department of Biology, Faculty of Science, Chulalongkorn University, who is key personnel in herpetology and malacology of Thailand.
