= Limushan =

Limushan 黎母山镇
- Town
- Location in Hainan
- Coordinates: 19°16′3″N 109°47′1″E
- Country: People's Republic of China
- Province: Hainan
- Autonomous county: Qiongzhong Li and Miao Autonomous County
- Time zone: UTC+8 (China Standard)

Limushan (Chinese: 黎母山; pinyin: Límǔshān) is a town under the administration of Qiongzhong Li and Miao Autonomous County, Hainan, China. As of 2020, it administers four residential neighborhoods and 12 villages:

Neighborhoods

- Yaozi Community (腰子社区)
- Yangjiang (阳江)
- Dafeng (大丰)
- Xinjing (新进)

Villages

- Xinlin Village (新林村)
- Yaozi Village (腰子村)
- Rongmu Village (榕木村)
- Dabao Village (大保村)
- Gantong Village (干埇村)
- Nanji Village (南吉村)
- Nanli Village (南利村)
- Wodai Village (握岱村)
- Damu Village (大木村)
- Hejiu Village (合究村)
- Songtao Village (松涛村)
- Xin Village (新村)
