= Amchang Wildlife Sanctuary =

Protected area in India

- IUCN category IV (habitat/species management area)
- Location within Assam Location within India
- Interactive map of Amchang Wildlife Sanctuary
- Location: Assam, India
- Nearest city: Guwahati
- Coordinates: 26°10′21″N 91°54′11″E
- Area: 70.13 sq. km
- Established: 1972; 54 years ago
- Governing body: Department of Environment & Forests, Assam

The Amchang Wildlife Sanctuary is a wildlife sanctuary located on the eastern fringe of Guwahati, Assam, India. The name Amchang is originated from the name of Arleng village named Amcheng (now Amsing) located in the heart of the wildlife sanctuary. The sanctuary is known for hosting rare and endangered birds and animals. Amchang's habitat is dominated by tropical moist deciduous forest with semi-evergreen forest in depressions and river-valleys. It is known for its elephants which have become isolated with no movement with other elephant-populations. The first published information of these elephants was found in 1985 There were depredations in the fringe areas, which are part of Guwahati city, the capital of Assam. It was acute as the pachyderms were confined to an isolated forest not very large. Hence, a protected area was mooted. The wild elephants from Amchang often enter parts of Guwahati City but on a few occasions they travelled to the heart of the city. The sanctuary has other mammals such as Chinese pangolin, slow loris, Assamese macaque, rhesus monkey, hoolock gibbon, leopard, leopard cat, jungle cat, sambar, barking deer, red serow, Malayan giant squirrel, crestless Himalayan porcupine.

However, it is the presence of an isolated population of gaur or Indian "bison" that has added significance to Amchang. This bovid is also confined to this sanctuary with no links to other areas. Amchang is an Important Bird & Biodiversity Area. The sanctuary has a diverse birdlife. Some noteworthy species found includes White-backed vulture, Slender-billed vulture, White-cheeked hill partridges, Grey peacock pheasant, Kaleej pheasant, Greater adjutant stork mostly in flight, Great pied hornbill, Oriental pied hornbill and Green imperial pigeon among many others. Prior to 2004, the area was made up of three individual reserved forests, the Amchang reserved forest, South Amchang reserved forest and Khanapara reserved forest. These three forests were combined in 2004 by the Assam government to form the sanctuary as it exists today. It is spread over in an area of 78.64 square kilometre

== 2017 eviction drive ==
In November 2017, Assam state police and the Indian Forest Department forcibly removed over 400 families who were living in the sanctuary at the request of the Supreme Court of India. According to state's Environment & Forest Minister Pramila Rani Brahma, the encroachment of settlers on the land has caused the elephants that live there to search for food outside of the sanctuary, causing deaths and destruction of crops in villages around Guwahati.

Police used various methods to disperse protestors of the eviction drive and families living in the sanctuary, including rubber bullets, tear gas, and elephants to destroy illegally built homes. 15 people were allegedly injured during the eviction, although this claim was denied by the then police commissioner of Guwahati.

The incident led to discussions about the rights of the indigenous people many of whom were victims of the forced eviction after being displaced by rampant flooding. Notably, the Coordination Committee of Tribal Organisations (CCTO) deemed the evictions "illegal".
