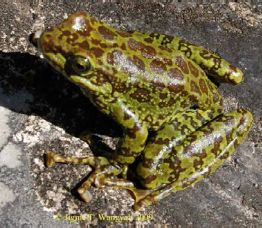

Conservation status
- Least Concern (IUCN 3.1)

Scientific classification
- Kingdom: Animalia
- Phylum: Chordata
- Class: Amphibia
- Order: Anura
- Family: Ranidae
- Genus: Amolops
- Species: A. mantzorum

Binomial name
- Amolops mantzorum (David, 1872)

Synonyms
- Polypedates mantzorum David, 1872 "1871"; Rana (Amolops) jugans Stejneger, 1926; Staurois jugans (Stejneger, 1926); Staurois mantzorum (David, 1872); Staurois kangtingensis Liu, 1950; Amolops kangtingensis (Liu, 1950)

= Amolops mantzorum =

Species of amphibian

Amolops mantzorum, commonly known as the Sichuan torrent frog or Kangting sucker frog, is a species of frog in the family Ranidae. It is found in Gansu, Sichuan, and Yunnan Provinces of China. It has recently been reported also from Bhutan.

Amolops mantzorum is an abundant species found in large streams and small rivers, in forest and shrubland. Male frogs measure 53 mm (2.1 in) and females frogs 65 mm (2.6 in) in snout–vent length.
