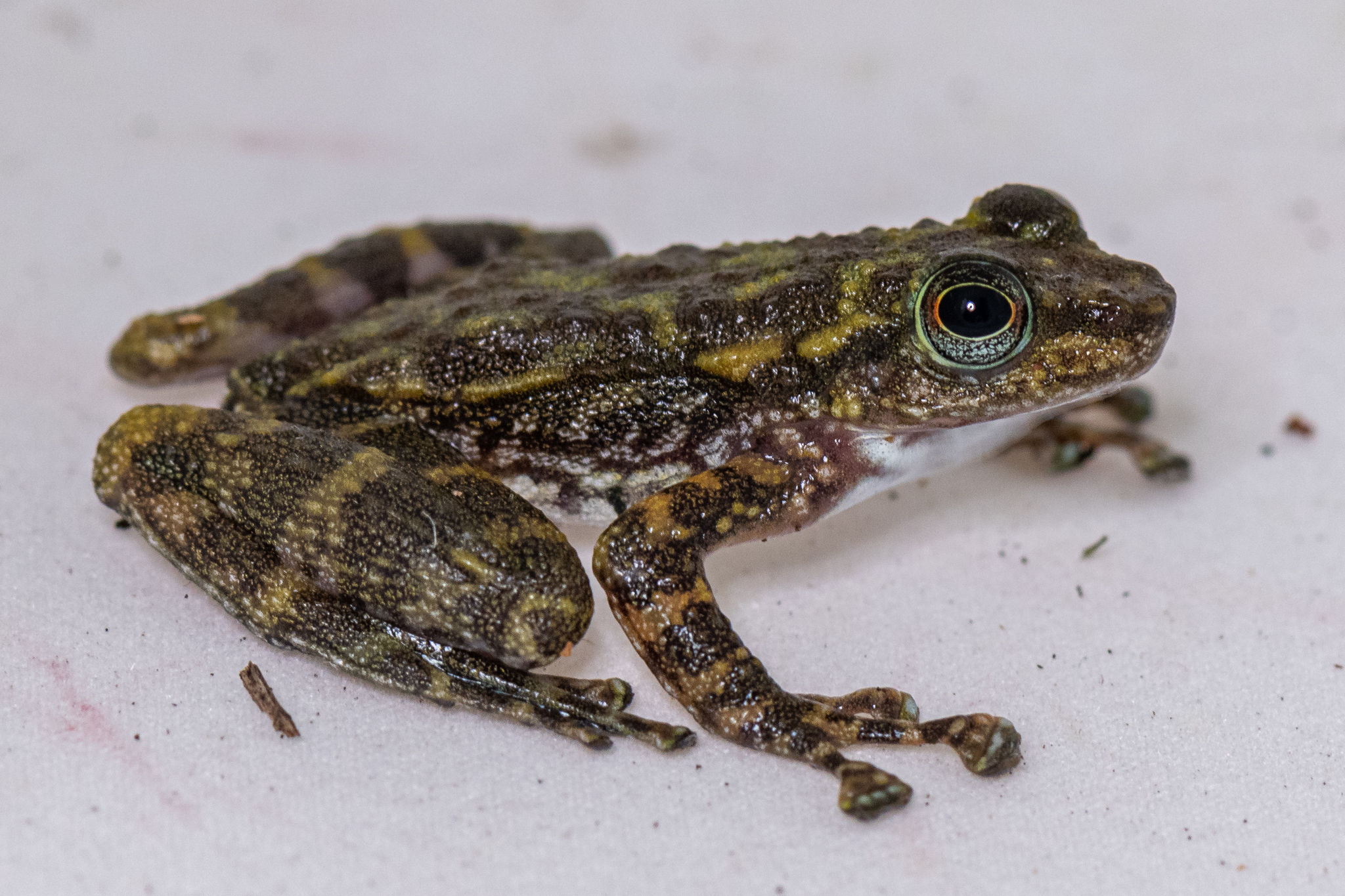

Conservation status
- Least Concern (IUCN 3.1)

Scientific classification
- Kingdom: Animalia
- Phylum: Chordata
- Class: Amphibia
- Order: Anura
- Family: Ranidae
- Genus: Amolops
- Species: A. cremnobatus

Binomial name
- Amolops cremnobatus Inger and Kottelat, 1998

= Amolops cremnobatus =

Species of amphibian

Amolops cremnobatus is a species of frogs in the family Ranidae. It is found in north-central Laos and Vietnam. Its range might extend into Thailand. The specific name cremnobatus is derived from Greek kremnobates, meaning "frequenter of steep places", and refers to the steep waterfall from which the type series were collected. Common name Lao sucker frog has been coined for it. Another common name is the Lao torrent frog and it has been suggested that it should change to Inger's Lao torrent frog because new species have been described from Amolops cremnobatus and will therefore avoid confusion.

== Description ==
The type series consists of two adult males measuring 32 and 34 mm (1.26 and 1.34 in) in snout–vent length. The overall appearance is slender, with the head wider than the body. The snout is short and almost truncate. The tympanum is distinct. The fingers are short but bear very wide discs; the medial edges of second and third fingers have distinct skin folds. The toes bear somewhat smaller discs and are fully webbed. Preserved specimens are dorsally and laterally black and have irregular, small, light markings that are yellowish brown in life. The dorsolateral folds are marked by series of short, light bars. The limbs bear wide, black crossbars. The ventral surfaces are white, sometimes with weak, black suffusion.

The tadpoles are dorsally and laterally black and ventrally white. Body length is up to 20 mm (0.8 in) and total length up to 51 mm (2.0 in).

== Habitat and conservation ==
Amolops cremnobatus is closely associated with fast-flowing, rocky streams and cascades in evergreen forest at elevations of 200–1,352 m (656–4,436 ft) above sea level. The eggs are adhesive and deposited in clutches on wet vertical rock faces within the splash zone of cascades. The tadpoles live clung to and climbing on the same rock faces.

Although Amolops cremnobatus can live in slightly disturbed forest, it is likely to suffer from changes in hydrological conditions (e.g., damming), habitat loss caused by logging, conversion to agriculture, and the development of infrastructure. It is also collected for food. It is known from a number of protected areas: Pù Mát National Park as well as Pu Hoat and Pu Hu Nature Reserves in Vietnam, and Nakai–Nam Theun National Biodiversity Conservation Area in Laos.
