= Niane Sivongxay =

Laotian herpetologist

Niane Sivongxay is a zoologist and herpetologist from Laos, who is Director of the South East Asian Ministers of Education Organisation (SEAMEO) Regional Centre for Community Education Development and is Assistant Professor of Biology at the National University of Laos. She specialises in the study of zooplankton, amphibians and reptiles.

== Biography ==
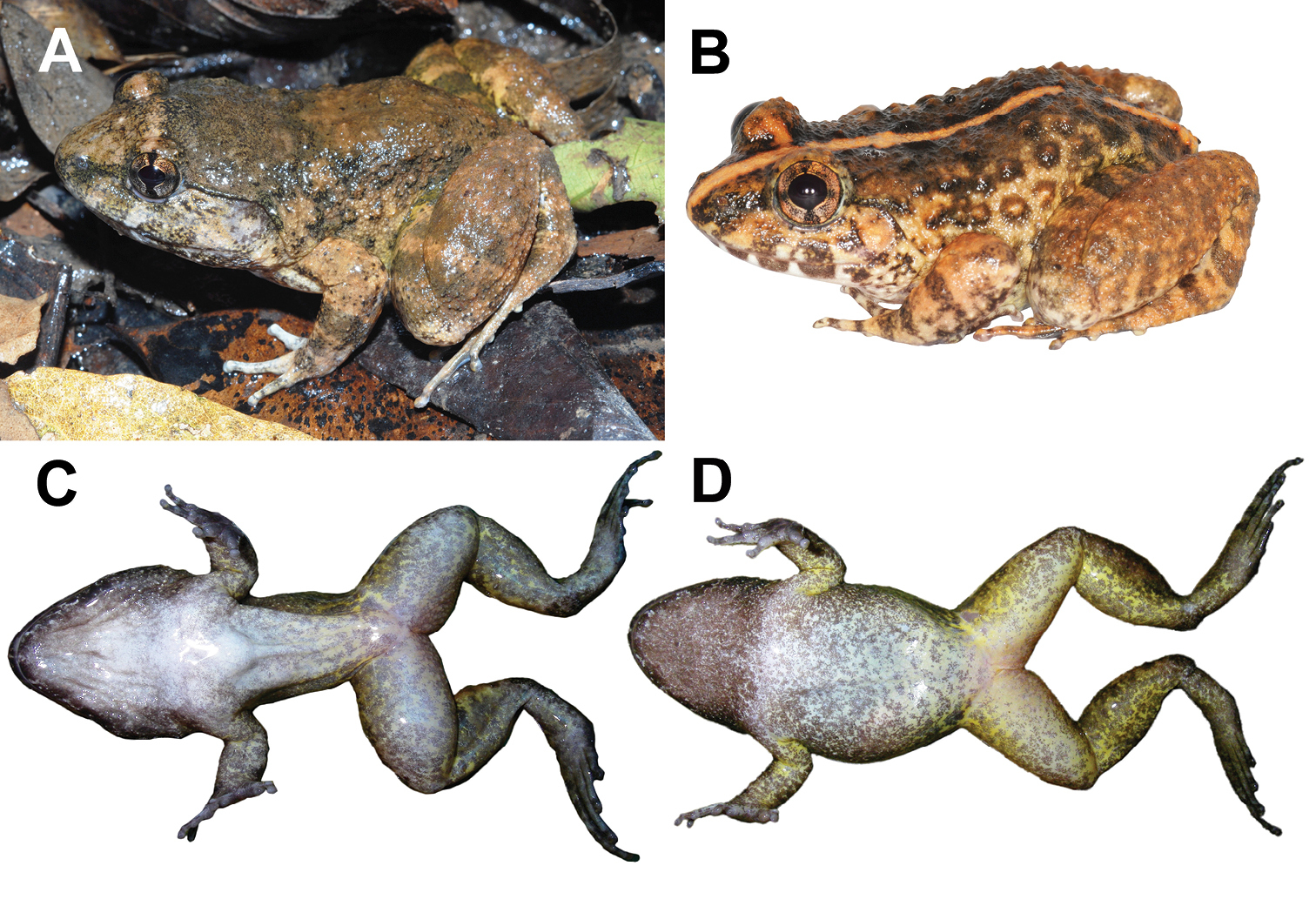
Limnonectes savan

Sivongxay studied in the former USSR for her undergraduate and Masters qualifications, before studying for a PhD at Khon Kaen University in Thailand, where she specialised in zooplankton. She is a National Expert on zooplankton and works as part of the Ecological Health Monitoring initiative in the Lower Mekong basin. From 2013 to 2017 she was a co-investigator on the project 'Biodiversity and conservation in the Lower Mekong: empowering female herpetologists through capacity building and regional networking'. As the project lead in Laos, she led eighteen field expeditions to record amphibians in the region.

She is Director of the South East Asian Ministers of Education Organisation (SEAMEO) Regional Centre for Community Education Development, at the Ministry of Education. She is also Assistant Professor of Biology at the National University of Laos.

== Taxon named ==
She has helped to name three geckos and three frogs.

- Limnonectes coffeatus
- Limnonectes savan
- Ptychozoon cicakterbang
- Ptychozoon kabkaebin
- Ptychozoon tokehos
- Theloderma lacustrinum
