= Zhangixalus thaoae =

- Adult male holotype

Scientific classification
- Kingdom: Animalia
- Phylum: Chordata
- Class: Amphibia
- Order: Anura
- Family: Rhacophoridae
- Genus: Zhangixalus
- Species: Z. thaoae

Binomial name
- Zhangixalus thaoae Nguyen, Ziegler et al., 2024

Species of frog

Zhangixalus thaoae, or Thao's tree frog, is a species of frog in the family Rhacophoridae found in Lào Cai province, northwestern Vietnam. It was described by Nguyen et al. in 2024 by specimens found in evergreen montane tropical forest at an elevation of about 1,883 meters above sea level. The species is named after the first author's wife, Nguyen Thi Thanh Thao, as a sign of gratitude for her support of research activities.

It mostly resembles Z. yaoshanensis but is distinguished by its smaller size (SVL 30.1–32.2 mm in males), coloration, and is genetically distant enough to be recognized as a separate species. Genetically, Z. thaoae is closest to Z. jodiae, Z. pinglongensis, and Z. yaoshanensis in the Z. chenfui group. According to the authors of the description, it is possible that in the future the species will be found in the evergreen forests of Guangxi province in southern China. Due to the lack of data on the species, the authors of the description recommended that the IUCN assign it Data Deficient status.

== Etymology ==
The name of the genus honors Zhang Ya-Ping from the Chinese Academy of Sciences, in recognition to his contributions to biodiversity and evolution research in China, in combination with ixalus, a common generic root for treefrogs. The specific name is in honor Nguyen Thi Thanh Thao, the wife of Tao Thien Nguyen, one of the zoologists who first described this frog, "as a token of gratitude for her understanding and strong support of his research activity".
