= Malayan flying frog =

Conservation status
- Least Concern (IUCN 3.1)

Scientific classification
- Kingdom: Animalia
- Phylum: Chordata
- Class: Amphibia
- Order: Anura
- Family: Rhacophoridae
- Genus: Zhangixalus
- Species: Z. prominanus

Binomial name
- Zhangixalus prominanus (Smith, 1924)

Synonyms
- Rhacophorus prominanus Smith, 1924; Rhacophorus tunkui Kiew, 1987

Species of amphibian

The Malayan flying frog (Zhangixalus prominanus) is a species of frog in the moss frog family (Rhacophoridae). It is found in Indonesia, Malaysia, and Thailand.

This is a largish flying frog, with females growing to a body length of up to 7.6 cm (about 3 in), and males reaching up to 6.2 cm in body length. It is generally jade green on the back and somewhat translucent when small, and a prominent red blotch on the webbing extends between the third and fifth hind toes.

Tadpoles are greyish green and have no markings. Towards metamorphosis, they become greener. They lose their tails when they are about 30–33 mm long, and freshly emergent juveniles measure about 15 mm. The labial tooth row formula (LTRF) is 5(2-5)/3 in small tadpoles and 6(2-6)/3 in older ones.

This arboreal frog lives in closed canopy forests. People have seen this frog between 250 and 1100 meters above sea level.

The IUCN classifies this frog as least concern of extinction because of its large range and presumed large population. Its range includes protected parks, such as Endau-Rompin National Park, Taman Negara National Park, and Hala-Bala Wildlife Sanctuary.

== Etymology ==
The name of the genus honors Zhang Ya-Ping from the Chinese Academy of Sciences, in recognition to his contributions to biodiversity and evolution research in China, in combination with ixalus, a common generic root for treefrogs The specifc name refers to the frog's prominent features including a red blotch on its hind toes.

== See also ==
- Rhacophorus bipunctatus and Rhacophorus rhodopus
- Rhacophorus kio a cryptic sister species of Rhacophorus reinwardtii
