= Zhangixalus hongchibaensis =

Conservation status
- Endangered (IUCN 3.1)

Scientific classification
- Kingdom: Animalia
- Phylum: Chordata
- Class: Amphibia
- Order: Anura
- Family: Rhacophoridae
- Genus: Zhangixalus
- Species: Z. hongchibaensis

Binomial name
- Zhangixalus hongchibaensis (Li, Liu, Chen, Wu, Murphy, Zhao, Wang, and Zhang, 2012)

Synonyms
- Rhacophorus hongchibaensis Li, Liu, Chen, Wu, Murphy, Zhao, Wang, and Zhang, 2012

Species of frog

Zhangixalus hongchibaensis, the Wuxi tree frog, is a frog in the family Rhacophoridae. Scientists know it from the type locality: Hongchiba in Wuxi County, Chongqing Province, China. It has been observed 1747 meters above sea level.

The adult male frog measures about 46.5–49.7 mm in snout-vent length and the adult female frog about 55.3 mm. The skin of the frog's dorsum is light green in color with yellow spots with dark brown edges. The front legs are short. There is light red color on the ventral sides of the hind legs and brown color on the toes. The innser surfaces of the hind legs are white with brown spots.

The female frog lays eggs in foam nests on the bottoms of grassy vegetation near water.

Scientists named this frog hongchibiensis after Hongchiba, which is the largest alpine grassland in China.

The IUCN classifies this frog as endangered because of its small range, though it does include one protected park: Micang Mountain National Nature Reserve.

== Etymology ==
The name of the genus honors Zhang Ya-Ping from the Chinese Academy of Sciences, in recognition to his contributions to biodiversity and evolution research in China, in combination with ixalus, a common generic root for tree frogs.

The species name honors its tyoe locality of Hongchiba.
