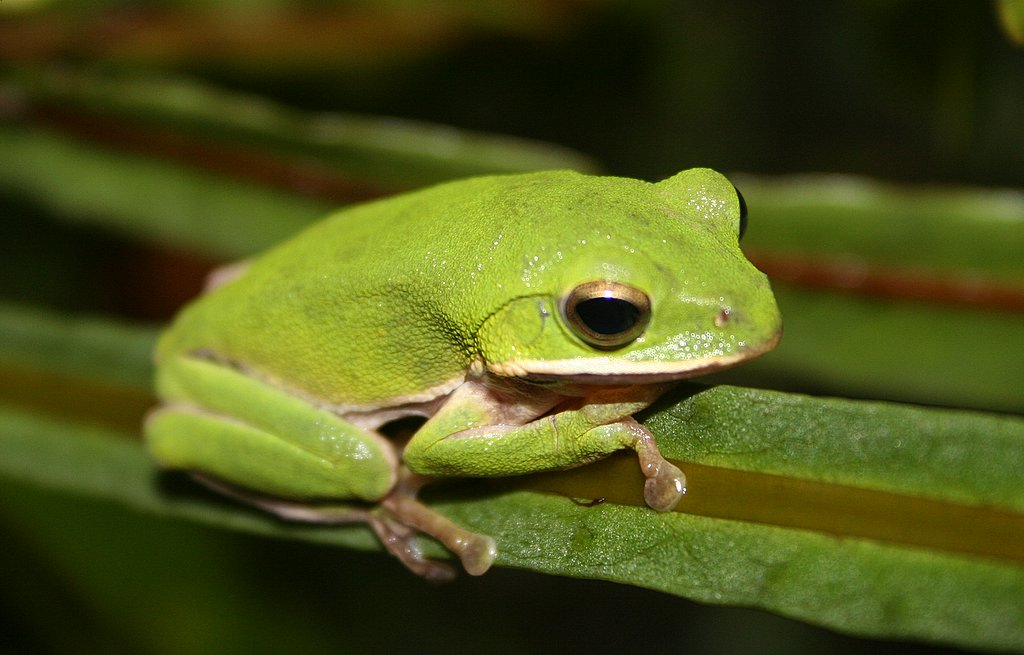
- Zhangixalus arvalis from Taiwan

Scientific classification
- Kingdom: Animalia
- Phylum: Chordata
- Class: Amphibia
- Order: Anura
- Family: Rhacophoridae
- Subfamily: Rhacophorinae
- Genus: Zhangixalus; Li, Jiang, Ren, and Jiang, 2019

Type species
- Polypedates dugritei David, 1872

Species
- 43 species (see text)

= Zhangixalus =

Genus of amphibians

Zhangixalus is a genus of frogs in the subfamily Rhacophorinae, family Rhacophoridae. They are collectively known as Zhang's treefrogs. They occur in the Eastern Himalayas, southern China, Taiwan, Japan, and southeast Asia.

== Etymology ==
The name of the genus honors Zhang Ya-Ping from the Chinese Academy of Sciences, in recognition to his contributions to biodiversity and evolution research in China, in combination with ixalus, a common generic root for treefrogs.

== Taxonomy ==
Zhangixalus was erected in a 2019 revision of the then very large genus Rhacophorus (92 species) that was split in three lineages: Rhacophorus sensu stricto (then 39 species; as of November 2021, 43 species), resurrected Leptomantis (then 14 species; as of November 2021, 13 species), and Zhangixalus (then 37 species; as of November 2021, 40 species). The split was based on molecular data, but was supported by morphological characteristics and differences in geographic distribution. Rhacophorus is the sister taxon to the clade formed by Zhangixalus and Leptomantis.

== Description ==
Zhangixalus are relatively large frogs, ranging between 30 and 120 mm (1.2 and 4.7 in) in snout–vent length, but typically more than 50 mm (2.0 in). The snout is rounded. The terminal phalanges of fingers and toes are Y-shaped. Dorsal skin is smooth or scattered with small tubercles. Most species have green dorsal coloration. Reproduction involves white foam nests produced by breeding pairs.

Zhangixalus, as delimited by Jiang and colleagues, includes a deeply divergent clade containing Z. achantharrhena, Z. dulitensis, and Z. prominanus. They differ from other Zhangixalus by possessing dermal folds along limbs and tarsal projections. The placement of these species is tentative, pending further study.

Zhangixalus are mostly larger than their closest relative, Leptomantis, and have generally green dorsal coloration, instead of light tan or reddish brown. They differ from Rhacophorus sensu stricto by lacking dermal folds along limbs and tarsal projections.

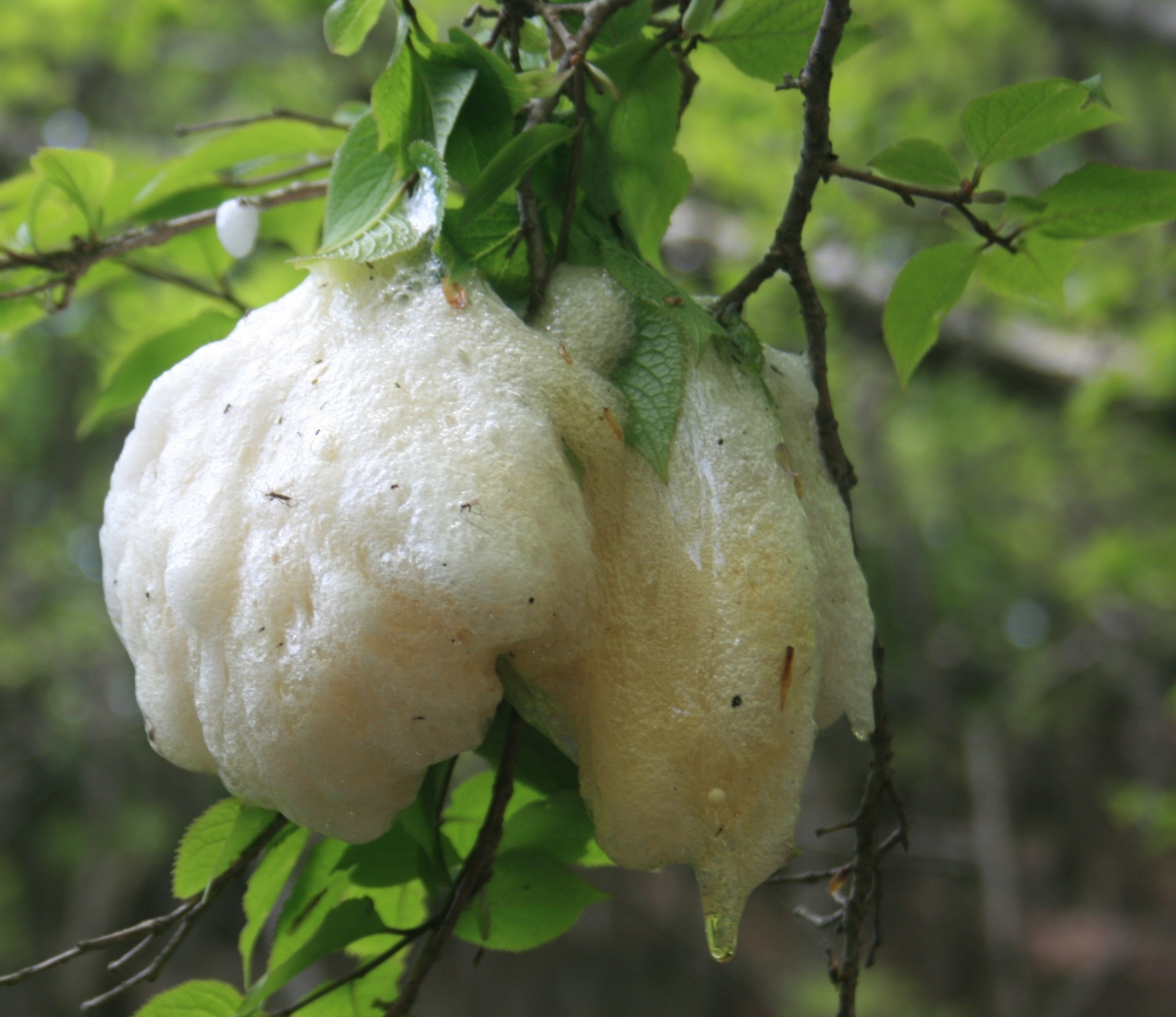
Foam nest of Zhangixalus arboreus from Japan.

== Species ==
There are 43 recognized species:

- Zhangixalus achantharrhena (Harvey, Pemberton, and Smith, 2002)
- Zhangixalus amamiensis (Inger, 1947)
- Zhangixalus arboreus (Okada and Kawano, 1924)
- Zhangixalus arvalis (Lue, Lai, and Chen, 1995)
- Zhangixalus aurantiventris (Lue, Lai, and Chen, 1994)
- Zhangixalus burmanus (Andersson, 1939)
- Zhangixalus chenfui (Liu, 1945)
- Zhangixalus dennysi (Blanford, 1881)
- Zhangixalus dorsoviridis (Bourret, 1937)
- Zhangixalus duboisi (Ohler, Marquis, Swan, and Grosjean, 2000)
- Zhangixalus dugritei (David, 1872)
- Zhangixalus dulitensis (Boulenger, 1892)
- Zhangixalus faritsalhadii Gonggoli, Munir, Kaprawi, Kirschey & Hamidy, 2024
- Zhangixalus feae (Boulenger, 1893)
- Zhangixalus franki Ninh, Nguyen, Orlov, Nguyen, and Ziegler, 2020
- Zhangixalus hongchibaensis (Li, Liu, Chen, Wu, Murphy, Zhao, Wang, and Zhang, 2012)
- Zhangixalus hui (Liu, 1945)
- Zhangixalus hungfuensis (Liu and Hu, 1961)
- Zhangixalus jarujini (Matsui and Panha, 2006)
- Zhangixalus jodiae Nguyen, Ninh, Orlov, Nguyen, and Ziegler, 2020
- Zhangixalus leucofasciatus (Liu and Hu, 1962)
- Zhangixalus lishuiensis (Liu, Wang, and Jiang, 2017)
- Zhangixalus matsuii Ninh, Hoang, Orlov, Ichioka, Ziegler & Nguyen, 2026
- Zhangixalus melanoleucus Brakels, Nguyen, Pawangkhanant, Idiiatullina, Lorphengsy, Suwannapoom & Poyarkov, 2023
- Zhangixalus minimus (Rao, Wilkinson, and Liu, 2006)
- Zhangixalus moltrechti (Boulenger, 1908)
- Zhangixalus nigropunctatus (Liu, Hu, and Yang, 1962)
- Zhangixalus omeimontis (Stejneger, 1924)
- Zhangixalus owstoni (Stejneger, 1907)
- Zhangixalus pachyproctus Yu, Hui, Hou, Wu, Rao, and Yang, 2019
- Zhangixalus pinglongensis (Mo, Chen, Liao, and Zhou, 2016)
- Zhangixalus prasinatus (Mou, Risch, and Lue, 1983)
- Zhangixalus prominanus (Smith, 1924)
- Zhangixalus puerensis (He, 1999)
- Zhangixalus schlegelii (Günther, 1858)
- Zhangixalus smaragdinus (Blyth, 1852)
- Zhangixalus suffry (Bordoloi, Bortamuli, and Ohler, 2007)
- Zhangixalus taipeianus (Liang and Wang, 1978)
- Zhangixalus thaoae T. T. Nguyen, H. H. Nguyen, Ninh, Le, Bui, Orlov, Hoang & Ziegler, 2024
- Zhangixalus viridis (Hallowell, 1861)
- Zhangixalus wui (Li, Liu, Chen, Wu, Murphy, Zhao, Wang, and Zhang, 2012)
- Zhangixalus yaoshanensis (Liu and Hu, 1962)
- Zhangixalus yinggelingensis (Chou, Lau, and Chan, 2007)
- Zhangixalus yunnanensis Pan, Hou, Yu & Liu, 2024
- Zhangixalus zhoukaiyae (Pan, Zhang, and Zhang, 2017)

The AmphibiaWeb recognizes the same species except Zhangixalus amamiensis, which is treated as being part of Zhangixalus viridis.
