= Zhangixalus puerensis =

Conservation status
- Least Concern (IUCN 3.1)

Scientific classification
- Kingdom: Animalia
- Phylum: Chordata
- Class: Amphibia
- Order: Anura
- Family: Rhacophoridae
- Genus: Zhangixalus
- Species: Z. puerensis

Binomial name
- Zhangixalus puerensis (He, 1999)

Synonyms
- Polypedates puerensis He, 1999; Rhacophorus puerensis (He, 1999)

Species of frog

Zhangixalus puerensis is a species of frog in the family Rhacophoridae. It is endemic to China, where it is only known from Banshan (半山), Pu'er City, Yunnan.

This frog has been observed in swampy meadows between 1400 and 2500 meters above sea level and in forests with trees in the families Juncus and Cyperaceae. The female frog makes a foam nest on grass near bodies of stagnant water, in which the tadpoles are presumed to develop.

Scientists used to consider this frog conspecific with Rhacophorus dugritei but reconsidered in 2011.

The IUCN classifies this frog as least concern of extinction because of its large range, which includes several protected parks, such as Gaoligongshan Nature Reserve, Wuliangshan Nature Reserve, and Ailaoshan Nature Reserve.

== Etymology ==
The name of the genus honors Zhang Ya-Ping from the Chinese Academy of Sciences, in recognition to his contributions to biodiversity and evolution research in China, in combination with ixalus, a common generic root for treefrogs The specific name ia in reference to the frog's type locality near Pu'er City, Yunnan, where the species is endemic.
