= Zhangixalus dorsoviridis =

Conservation status
- Vulnerable (IUCN 3.1)

Scientific classification
- Kingdom: Animalia
- Phylum: Chordata
- Class: Amphibia
- Order: Anura
- Family: Rhacophoridae
- Genus: Zhangixalus
- Species: Z. dorsoviridis

Binomial name
- Zhangixalus dorsoviridis (Bourret, 1937)

Synonyms
- Rhacophorus schlegelii dorsoviridis Bourret, 1937; Rhacophorus dorsoviridis Bourret, 1937; Polypedates dorsoviridis (Bourret, 1937)

Species of frog

Zhangixalus dorsoviridis, also known as the green-back treefrog, is a species of frog in the family Rhacophoridae that is found in northern Vietnam and southern China (Yunnan). It may be confused with Rhacophorus nigropunctatus.

This frog lives in montane forests between 25 and 50 meters away from streams between 1500 and 2200 meters above sea level. It has been observed sitting 2–3 meters above the ground on ginger plants.

The male frog digs a shallow hole under a rock and calls to the female frogs. The female frog lays her eggs in the hole. When the eggs hatch, the tadpoles move to the stream or other water.

The IUCN classifies this frog as vulnerable to extinction because of its limited range. Threats include deforestation in favor of tourism and agriculture, such as for cardamom.

Scientists are concerned that people might catch this frog to sell as part of the international pet trade because of its coloration, but no incidents have yet been reported. It has occurred with other colorful frogs.

The frog's range includes at least three protected parks: Hoang Lien National Park, Copia Nature Reserve, and Bat Xat Nature Reserve. Scientists think it could live in Jinpingfenshuiling Nature Reserve and Guanyinshan Nature Reserve too.

== Etymology ==
The name of the genus honors Zhang Ya-Ping from the Chinese Academy of Sciences, in recognition to his contributions to biodiversity and evolution research in China, in combination with ixalus, a common generic root for tree frogs.

The species name dorsoviridis refers to the frog's green back, as in its common name.
