= Zhangixalus jarujini =

Conservation status
- Least Concern (IUCN 3.1)

Scientific classification
- Kingdom: Animalia
- Phylum: Chordata
- Class: Amphibia
- Order: Anura
- Family: Rhacophoridae
- Genus: Zhangixalus
- Species: Z. jarujini

Binomial name
- Zhangixalus jarujini (Matsui and Panha, 2006)

Synonyms
- Rhacophorus jarujini Matsui and Panha, 2006

Species of frog

Zhangixalus jarujini is a species of frog in the family Rhacophoridae. It is endemic to north-eastern Thailand and known from the Kalasin, Roi Et, and Ubon Ratchathani Provinces. The specific name jarujini honours Jarujin Nabhitabhata from the National Science Museum of Thailand. Common name Jarujin's treefrog has been coined for it.

== Description ==
Adult males measure 34–40 mm (1.3–1.6 in) and adult females 42–46 mm (1.7–1.8 in) in snout–vent length. The snout is rounded dorsally and angular in profile. The tympanum is visible. Both fingers and toes are broadly webbed and have discs, the toe discs being smaller than those on the fingers. The dorsum is light brown. There is a narrow dark band running between the eyes. The back has irregular dark crossbands. The underside is patternless, anteriorly cream and posteriorly yellow. The ventral surfaces of hands, feet, and thighs are light orange. The limbs have dark crossbars. The webbing is reddish brown. The iris is yellow. Males have median subgular vocal sac.

The tadpole has a striking colouration: the body is yellowish grey with gold lateral stripe, and the tail is light yellow in its anterior part and bright red further back, with the whole tail covered with irregular black spots. The largest specimen (Gosner stage 38) measured 19 mm (0.75 in) in body length.

== Habitat and conservation ==
Zhangixalus jarujini occurs in a variety of habitats within dipterocarp and hilly evergreen forests at elevations of 230–500 m (750–1,640 ft) above sea level. Individuals have been found on the ground or in vegetation (from near the ground to up to 2 metres above the ground) near small bodies of water including a rain pool in igneous rock, a seep running over solid rock, a rocky stream, small ponds, and a dried rocky stream bed with small pools. Tadpoles are known from a small stream pool with silt and leaf-litter bottom.

The known populations occur in protected areas, including Phu Sri Tan Wildlife Sanctuary, Phu Pha Namtip Non-hunting Area, and Phu Jong-Na Yoi National Park. These populations might not face any threats. However, outside the protected areas much of the natural vegetation has been lost, and Zhangixalus jarujini has likely lost much of its original habitat.

== Etymology ==
The name of the genus honors Zhang Ya-Ping from the Chinese Academy of Sciences, in recognition to his contributions to biodiversity and evolution research in China, in combination with ixalus, a common generic root for tree frogs. The specific name jarujini honours Jarujin Nabhitabhata from the National Science Museum of Thailand.
