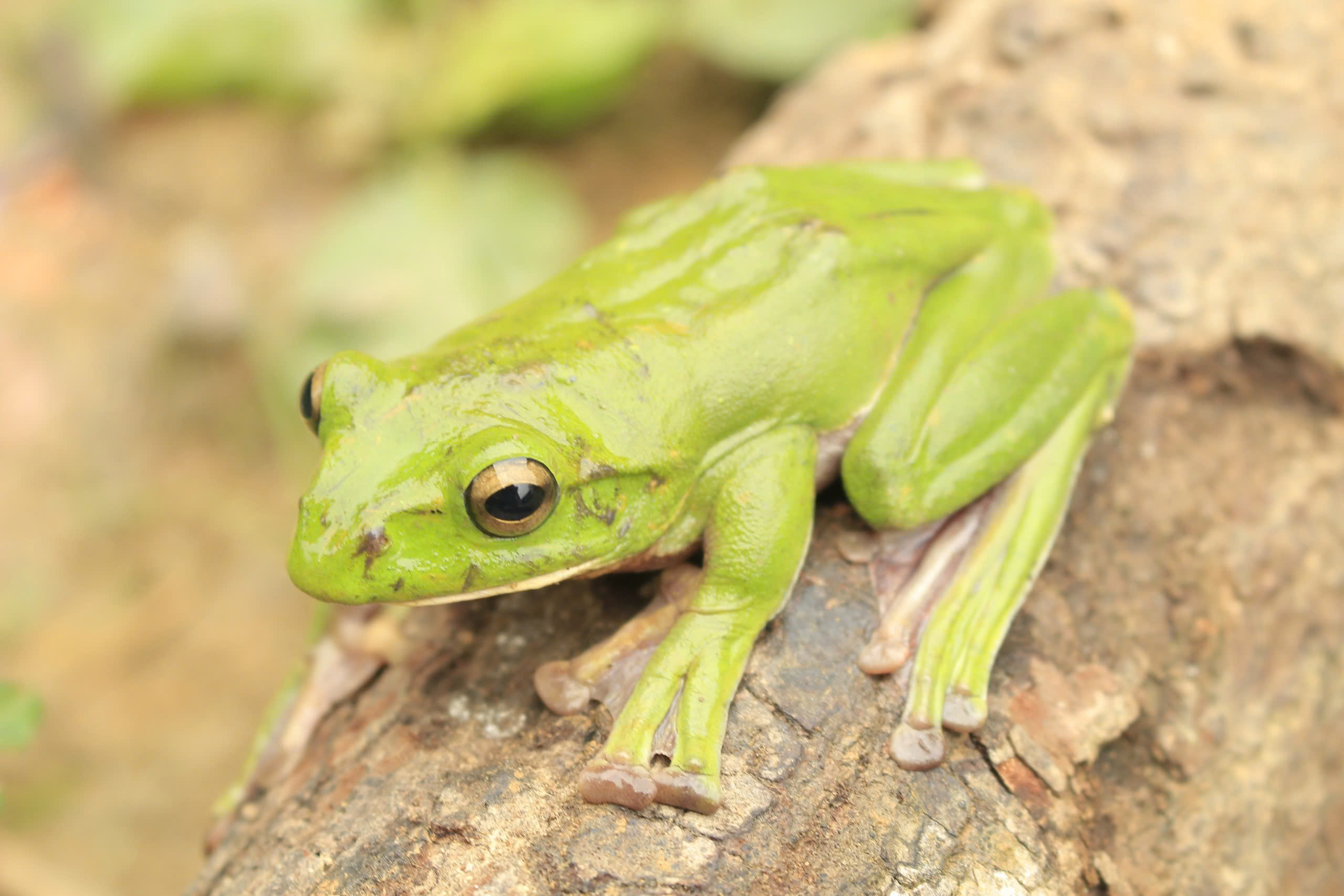

Scientific classification
- Kingdom: Animalia
- Phylum: Chordata
- Class: Amphibia
- Order: Anura
- Family: Rhacophoridae
- Genus: Zhangixalus
- Species: Z. pachyproctus

Binomial name
- Zhangixalus pachyproctus Yu, Hui, Hou, Wu, Rao, and Yang, 2019

= Zhangixalus pachyproctus =

Species of frog

Zhangixalus pachyproctus, the protruded vent tree frog, thick anus tree frog, or white-lipped tree frog, is a species of frog in the family Rhacophoridae. It is endemic to eastern China, Vietnam, and Thailand and predicted in Laos and Myanmar.

The adult male frog measures approximately 74.2–83.3 mm in snout-vent length and the adult female frog approximately 102.4 mm. The frog has white stripes down the sides of its jaw, body, and legs.

== Etymology ==
The name of the genus honors Zhang Ya-Ping from the Chinese Academy of Sciences, in recognition to his contributions to biodiversity and evolution research in China, in combination with ixalus, a common generic root for treefrogs. The specific name refers to the frog's thick protruding anus, from the Greek "πᾰχύᾰ" pachys meaning thick or massive and "πρωκτός" proctus meaning anus.
