= Zhangixalus pinglongensis =

Conservation status
- Data Deficient (IUCN 3.1)

Scientific classification
- Kingdom: Animalia
- Phylum: Chordata
- Class: Amphibia
- Order: Anura
- Family: Rhacophoridae
- Genus: Zhangixalus
- Species: Z. pinglongensis

Binomial name
- Zhangixalus pinglongensis (Mo, Chen, Liao, and Zhou, 2016)

Synonyms
- Rhacophorus pinglongensis Mo, Chen, Liao, and Zhou, 2016

Species of frog

Zhangixalus pinglongensis, the Pinglong tree frog, is a species of frog in the family Rhacophoridae. It is endemic to Guangxi Province, China and suspected in northeastern Vietnam. It has been observed between 1500 and 2000 meters above sea level in evergreen forests.

The adult male frog is measures 32.0–38.5 mm in snout-vent length. The skin of the dorsum is smooth and green with white blotches. The iris of the eye is silver in color. The undersides of the feet are bright tangerine orange in color.

This frog is known exclusively from high elevations, between 1500 and 2500 meters above sea level, near ponds. The female frog lays her eggs at the bottoms of grassy plants not far from water. Scientists infer that the species breeds through larval development.

The IUCN classifies this frog as endangered because of its small, threatened range. This range does contain two protected parks, Micang Mountain Nature Reserve and Hongchiba National Forest Park. The creation of infrastructure for tourism, may pose further threat to the frog's habitat.

== Etymology ==
The name of the genus honors Zhang Ya-Ping from the Chinese Academy of Sciences, in recognition to his contributions to biodiversity and evolution research in China, in combination with ixalus, a common generic root for treefrogs.

The specific name is in reference to Pinglong (Chinese: 平乐) a county situated within the Guangxi Province.
