= Zhangixalus zhoukaiyae =

Conservation status
- Data Deficient (IUCN 3.1)

Scientific classification
- Kingdom: Animalia
- Phylum: Chordata
- Class: Amphibia
- Order: Anura
- Family: Rhacophoridae
- Genus: Zhangixalus
- Species: Z. zhoukaiyae

Binomial name
- Zhangixalus zhoukaiyae (Pan, Zhang, and Zhang, 2017)

Synonyms
- Rhacophorus zhoukaiyae T. Pan, Y. Zhang, and B. Zhang in Pan, Zhang, Wang, Wu, Kang, Qian, Li, Zhang, Chen, Rao, Jiang, and Zhang, 2017; Zhangixalus zhoukaiyae Jiang, Jiang, Ren, Wu, and Li, 2019

Species of frog

Zhangixalus zhoukaiyae, the Anhui tree frog, is a species of frog in the family Rhacophoridae, endemic to China. It has been observed in the Dabie Mountains in Anhui Province.

The skin of the ventrum and parts of the legs is yellow in color. The throat and chest are lighter yellow in color. The dorsal surfaces of the toes are gray-white in color. The iris of the eye is yellow-gold in color.

This frog has been observed in marshes, ponds, evergreen forests, and irrigated areas between 731 and 773 meters above sea level. This frog's range includes at least one protected park: Yaoluoping National Nature Reserve.

== Etymology ==
The name of the genus honors Zhang Ya-Ping from the Chinese Academy of Sciences, in recognition to his contributions to biodiversity and evolution research in China, in combination with ixalus, a common generic root for treefrogs. The specific name is in honor of Chinese biologist Zhou Kaiya.
