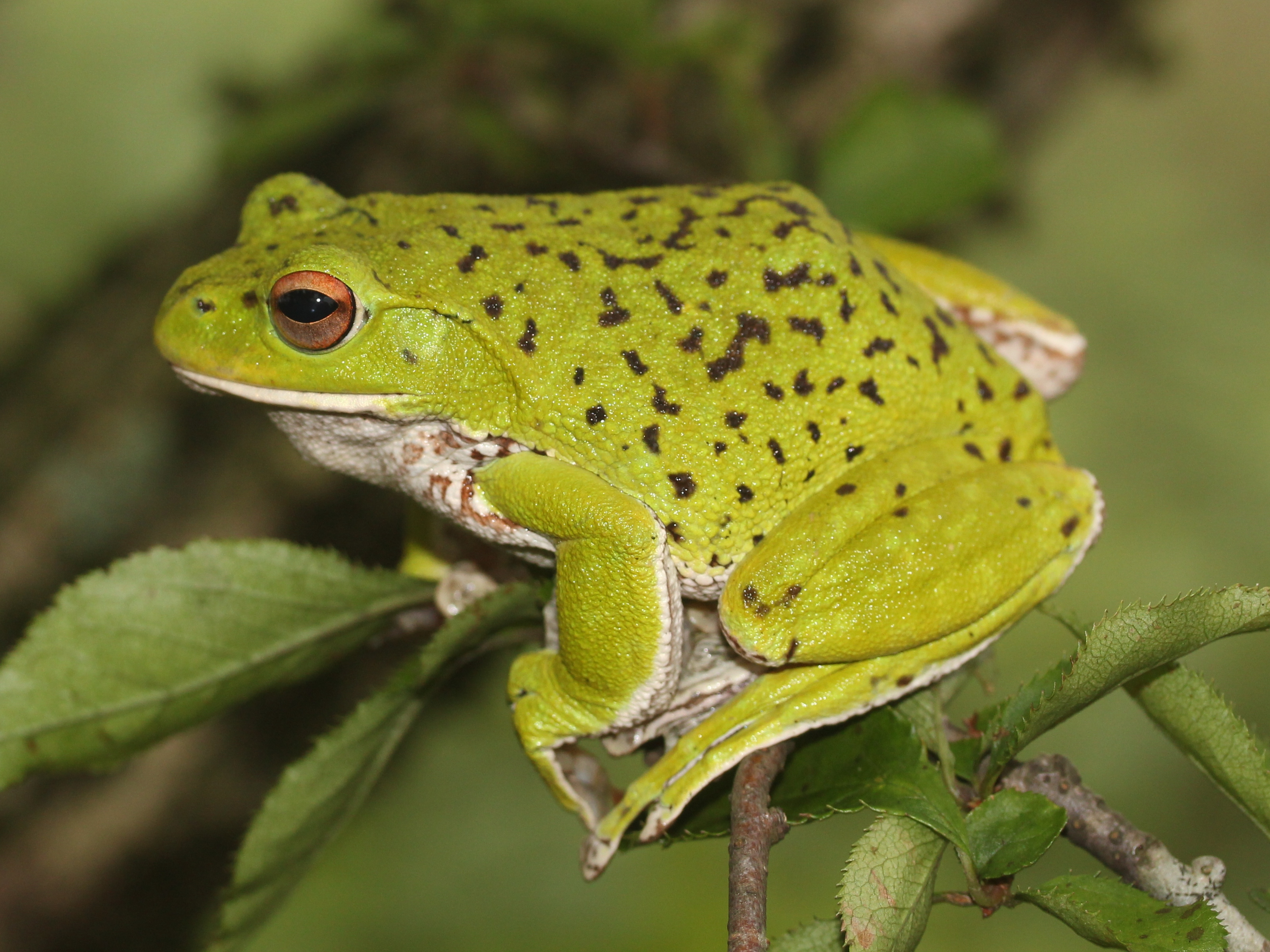

Conservation status
- Least Concern (IUCN 3.1)

Scientific classification
- Kingdom: Animalia
- Phylum: Chordata
- Class: Amphibia
- Order: Anura
- Family: Rhacophoridae
- Genus: Zhangixalus
- Species: Z. arboreus

Binomial name
- Zhangixalus arboreus (Okada & Kawano, 1924)

Synonyms
- Rhacophorus arboreus (Okada & Kawano, 1924)

= Zhangixalus arboreus =

Species of amphibian

Zhangixalus arboreus, also known as the forest green tree frog and Kinugasa flying frog, is a species of frog in the family Rhacophoridae endemic to Japan, where it has been observed on Honshu island, between 10 and 2350 meters above sea level.

== Appearance ==
The adult male frog measures about 42–60 mm in snout-vent length and the adult female frog about 59–82 mm. They have more webbed skin on their front feet than on their hind feet. The skin of the dorsum is bright green, sometimes with spots. The skin of the belly is white with brown spots. The iris of the eye is red-brown in color.

== Habitat and life cycle ==
The natural habitats of Z. arboreus are subtropical or tropical moist lowland forest, freshwater marshes, and irrigated land. These small tree frogs spend their adult lives in trees and forests, and in breeding season gather around water sources to mate. They lay their eggs within a batch of sponge-like foam which is suspended from a tree branch, usually hanging over a pond, marsh, or slow-flowing stream. The tadpoles emerge from the eggs, wiggle their way out of the foam, and drop down into the water below. These batches of foam can often be seen hanging over ponds in the Japanese countryside in late spring. Sometimes the frogs mistakenly lay their eggs over inappropriate bodies of water, such as swimming pools, wells, or even buckets containing rainwater.

== Relationship to humans ==
This species of tree frog is a rarely seen in the exotic pet trade, with the majority of these individuals being of wild-caught origin. Despite this, there has been an increase in the captive breeding of Zhangixalus arboreus for the pet trade in both Japan and South Korea. In 2023, Zhangixalus arboreus was captive bred for the first time in the UK by Gary Miller, head of Zoo at Sparsholt College.

Human tourists also visit Z. arboreus breeding pools to observe the animal in its natural habitat.

== Etymology ==
The name of the genus honors Zhang Ya-Ping from the Chinese Academy of Sciences, in recognition to his contributions to biodiversity and evolution research in China, in combination with ixalus, a common generic root for tree frogs. The specific name arboreus references the frog's forest habitat.

== Threats ==
The IUCN classifies this frog as least concern of extinction because of its large range. There are reports it has been spotted on Hokkaido, but it is not clear if this is a breeding population or an escaped pet or pets.
