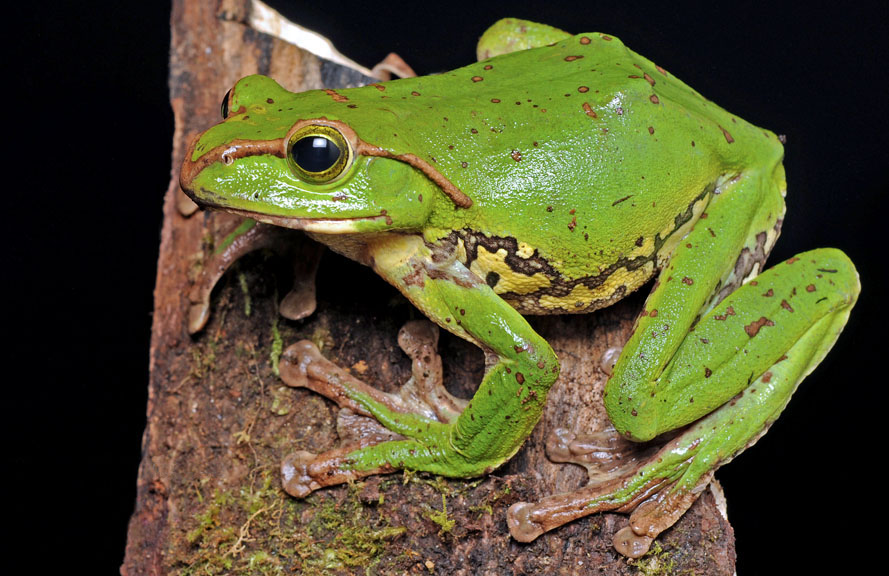

Conservation status
- Least Concern (IUCN 3.1)

Scientific classification
- Kingdom: Animalia
- Phylum: Chordata
- Class: Amphibia
- Order: Anura
- Family: Rhacophoridae
- Genus: Zhangixalus
- Species: Z. burmanus

Binomial name
- Zhangixalus burmanus (Andersson, 1939)

Synonyms
- Rhacophorus gongshanensis Yang and Su, 1984; Rhacophorus taronensis Smith, 1940; Polypedates gongshanensis (Yang and Su, 1984); Rhacophorus burmanus (Andersson, 1939)

= Zhangixalus burmanus =

Species of frog

Zhangixalus burmanus is a species of frog in the family Rhacophoridae. It is found in Yunnan in southern China, Nagaland in northeastern India, and northern Myanmar.

This frog has been found in primary and secondary forest. It has not been observed on farms but has been observed near human habitations. This frog lives between 1000 and 2080 meters above sea level.

This frog lays eggs near pools of rainwater. It breeds through larval development.

The IUCN classifies this frog as not in danger of extinction because of its large range. What threat it faces is associated with logging and agriculture. Some people catch this frog to eat.

== Etymology ==
The name of the genus honors Zhang Ya-Ping from the Chinese Academy of Sciences, in recognition to his contributions to biodiversity and evolution research in China, in combination with ixalus, a common generic root for tree frogs.

The species name burmanus refers to the country of Myanmar also known as Burma.
