= Zhangixalus minimus =

Conservation status
- Near Threatened (IUCN 3.1)

Scientific classification
- Kingdom: Animalia
- Phylum: Chordata
- Class: Amphibia
- Order: Anura
- Family: Rhacophoridae
- Genus: Zhangixalus
- Species: Z. minimus

Binomial name
- Zhangixalus minimus (Rao, Wilkinson, and Liu, 2006)

Synonyms
- Rhacophorus minimus Rao, Wilkinson, and Liu, 2006

Species of frog

Zhangixalus minimus, the minimal tree frog, is a species of frog in the family Rhacophoridae. It is endemic to China. It has been observed on Dayao Mountain in Guangxi Province.

This frog has been observed in broadleaf evergreen forests in monsoon climates. The adults perch on shrubs or bushes or near ponds, though they have also been observed by roadsides. The female frog makes a white foam nest to lay eggs in. This frog has been observe at elevations between 900 and 1600 meters above sea level.

The IUCN classifies this frog as at least concern of extinction because of its large range, which does not appear to be significantly fragmented. The frog's range contains at least one protected park in it: Huaping Nature Reserve. In the past, there was some concern related to wood harvesting, but this has fallen off due to improved management practices.

== Etymology ==
The name of the genus honors Zhang Ya-Ping from the Chinese Academy of Sciences, in recognition to his contributions to biodiversity and evolution research in China, in combination with ixalus, a common generic root for treefrogs. The specific name minimus refers to the frog's small size of roughly 33 milimeters.
