= Zhangixalus wui =

Conservation status
- Vulnerable (IUCN 3.1)

Scientific classification
- Kingdom: Animalia
- Phylum: Chordata
- Class: Amphibia
- Order: Anura
- Family: Rhacophoridae
- Genus: Zhangixalus
- Species: Z. wui

Binomial name
- Zhangixalus wui (Li, Liu, Chen, Wu, Murphy, Zhao, Wang, and Zhang, 2012)

Synonyms
- Rhacophorus wui Li, Liu, Chen, Wu, Murphy, Zhao, Wang, and Zhang, 2012

Species of frog

Zhangixalus wui, the Lichuan tree frog, is a species of frog in the family Rhacophoridae. It is endemic to China. Scientists know it from the type locality: Hanchi Village in Hubei Province.

== Appearance ==
The adult male frog measures about 35.2–38.2 mm in snout-vent length and the adult female frog about 48.6 mm. The skin of the dorsum can be dark yellow-brown to light green in color on the back and sides. It has light brown spots that are dark yellow-brown on the edges. Frogs that live in grass tend to be greener than those that live in mud. The belly is cream-white with gray marks. The sides of the legs can be light red-white with gray marks. The insides of the back legs are white with brown spots. There are round disks on the toes for climbing.

== Habitat and reproduction ==
Male frogs have been observed on plants near ponds. The female frog lays eggs in the water, on moss, or on other plants. This frog has been observed between 1550 and 2000 meters above sea level.

Scientists believe the frog breeds through larval development, like its congeners.

== Threats ==
Scientists think this frog is at some risk of dying out because it only lives in one place and they do not think it lives anywhere else. Human beings cut down the forests where it lives to build roads. Chemicals meant to grow crops and chemicals meant to kill farm pests can also kill this frog, but as of 2021, there are not many of these chemicals near where the frog lives.

== Etymology ==
The name of the genus honors Zhang Ya-Ping from the Chinese Academy of Sciences, in recognition to his contributions to biodiversity and evolution research in China, in combination with ixalus, a common generic root for treefrogs. Scientists named this frog after Guan-fu Wu for great contributions to the herpetology of China.
