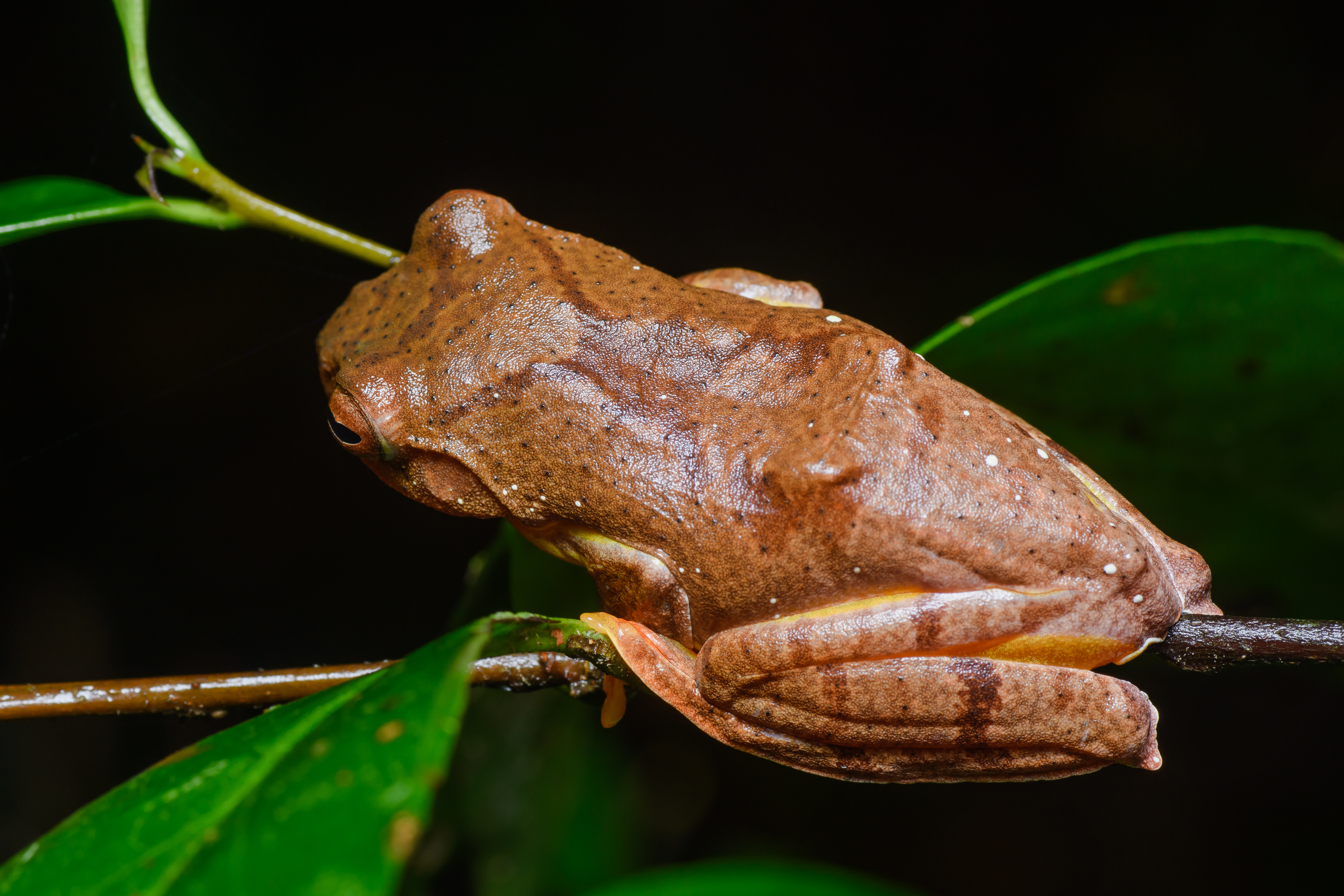
- Rhacophorus rhodopus - Phu Kradueng National Park

Conservation status
- Least Concern (IUCN 3.1)

Scientific classification
- Kingdom: Animalia
- Phylum: Chordata
- Class: Amphibia
- Order: Anura
- Family: Rhacophoridae
- Genus: Rhacophorus
- Species: R. rhodopus

Binomial name
- Rhacophorus rhodopus Liu & Hu, 1960

Synonyms
- Rhacophorus namdaphaensis Sarkar & Sanyal, 1985

= Rhacophorus rhodopus =

Species of frog

Rhacophorus rhodopus is a species of frog in the moss frog family (Rhacophoridae). It occurs in south-eastern Asia, from India to southern China, and south to Malaysia. Previously unknown from Laos, it has now been found in Phongsali Province and at Luang Prabang. Its taxonomy is disputed.

== Description ==
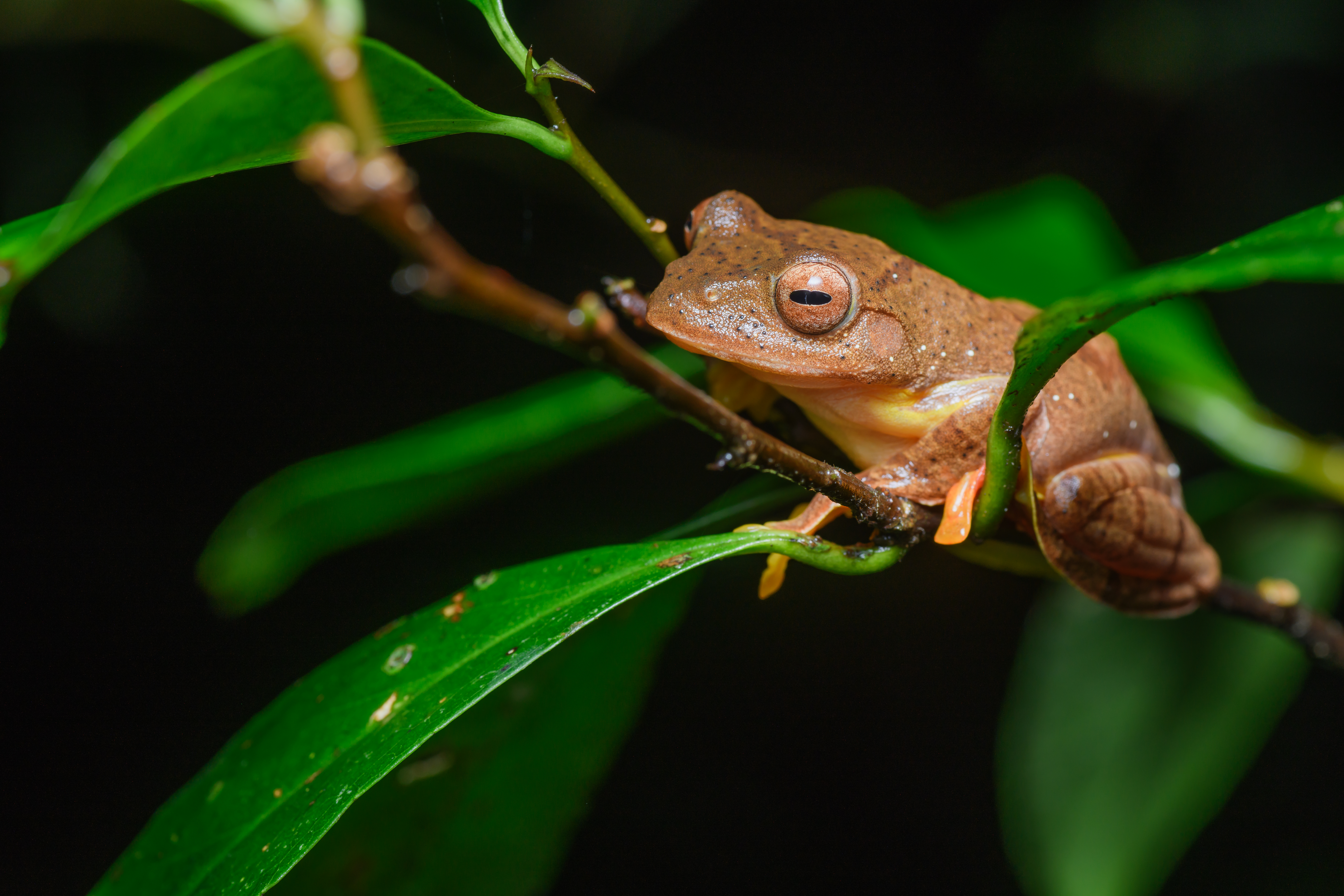
Rhacophorus rhodopus - Phu Kradueng National Park

R. rhodopus is a smallish tree frog with a pointed snout and body length of about 31–55 mm (1.2–2.2 in) when adult, with females being larger than males. Its back is reddish-, pinkish-, or yellowish-brown without any green hues in living animals; in preserved specimens this becomes purplish brown. There are many darker spots all over the back, usually forming an X-shaped pattern behind the head and sometimes stripes across the lower back. Sometimes, there are a few large white spots on the back, also. The hind legs and the upper sides of the arms are for the most part or entirely the color of the back; there are usually dark bands across the upperside of arms and hind legs. The sides, belly and toes are dark yellow, becoming dark pink in preserved specimens. Behind the arms, there is almost always a conspicuous large black spot on the flanks. The well-developed webbing of the toes is bright orange-red and not spotted. The eyes are light brown.

It can be distinguished from R. bipunctatus, with which it was long confused, by the smaller size (R. bipunctatus has a body length of about 37–60 mm) and spotted brown back without any green or olive (R. bipunctatus has a bright green to brownish green back without darker spotting). In individuals of similar size, R. bipunctatus has a much larger head.

== Ecology and status ==
Its natural habitats are subtropical or tropical moist lowland forests, subtropical or tropical moist montane forests, and intermittent freshwater marshes. It occurs from nearly sea level to altitudes of at least 1,500 m (4,900 ft) ASL.

R. rhodopus was included in the IUCN status assessment for R. bipunctatus, with which it was then considered synonymous, and assessed as a Species of Least Concern due to its wide range in 2004. R. namdaphaensis, which refers to the same frogs as R. rhodopus, was assessed as a Data Deficient species in 2004, due to uncertainties about the limits of its distribution. Altogether, when R. rhodopus is accepted as a valid species (including R. namdaphaensis), it would be of Least Concern, meaning it is not threatened.

=== Taxonomy ===
R. rhodopus was described in 1960, based on specimens from Mengyang in the Xishuangbanna Dai Autonomous Prefecture of Yunnan, China; the holotype is in the CIB, specimen 571171. Subsequently, frogs that matched the description of R. rhodopus were also found at Chiang Mai and in the Doi Chiang Dao mountains (Thailand), Buon Luoi (Vietnam), and Arunachal Pradesh (India). The latter were described as R. namdaphaensis in 1985; however, they were not compared with R. rhodopus at that time, only with R. dulitensis.

In 1999, it was stated that R. rhodopus is a junior synonym of the frog that, after much renaming due to homonymy, had become known as R. bipunctatus. But the type specimens were not examined; it was simply stated that Lui and Hu had misread some old descriptions of R. bipunctatus and that, as frogs from Vietnam were quite obviously of the same species as those from Thailand – which were believed to be R. bipunctatus –, R. rhodopus was synonymized with R. bipunctatus. However, R. bipunctatus had in fact never been reported from so far to the southeast by any older author. In 2005, a similar moss frog from Myanmar was described as Htun Win's Treefrog (Rhacophorus htunwini).

The mystery was unravelled when the type specimens of R. bipunctatus and R. namdaphaensis were finally examined and compared with other specimens from southeastern Asia in 2007. It turned out that the frogs from the border region of India, China and Myanmar, originally described as R. bipunctatus, matched R. htunwini, but not the frogs described as R. rhodopus and R. namdaphaensis. So the actual situation seems to be that the three taxa refer to two, not three species, with R. htunwini being a junior synonym of R. bipunctatus – possibly a restricted-range endemic of upland forest at the eastern end of the Himalayas, though it might occur south to Malaysia –, and R. namdaphaensis a junior synonym of R. rhodopus, a species that ranges widely from eastern India to the east and south and also occurs in lower-lying regions.

Thus, it seems that the 1999 study compared only specimens of R. rhodopus with other specimens of R. rhodopus, and therefore its conclusion that these constituted just one species was indeed correct. The mistake was rather the failure to compare even a single individual of the actual R. bipunctatus with the frogs from Thailand and Vietnam. Indeed, the authors of the 1999 study stated,

"[Liu and Hu] assumed that [R. bipunctatus] was green, possibly because Boulenger (1882) reported that it resembled R. reinwardtii.";

but that it usually does have a green back was confirmed both by the description of R. htunwini and by examination of the lectotype specimen of R. bipunctatus. In fact, the separation of R. htunwini from R. rhodopus – then called R. bipunctatus – was partly due to that striking difference in dorsal coloration.
