= Zhangixalus leucofasciatus =

Conservation status
- Data Deficient (IUCN 3.1)

Scientific classification
- Kingdom: Animalia
- Phylum: Chordata
- Class: Amphibia
- Order: Anura
- Family: Rhacophoridae
- Genus: Zhangixalus
- Species: Z. leucofasciatus

Binomial name
- Zhangixalus leucofasciatus (Liu and Hu, 1962)

Synonyms
- Rhacophorus leucofasciatus Liu and Hu, 1962; Zhangixalus leucofasciatus Jiang, Jiang, Ren, Wu, and Li, 2019

Species of frog

Zhangixalus leucofasciatus, the white-striped tree frog, is a species of frog in the family Rhacophoridae. It is endemic to China and has been osberved in Guangxi Province and Guizhou Province.

This frog has been observed in montaine bamboo forests. It has been observed 800 meters above sea level, and scientists believe it to range between 750 and 850 meters above sea level.

Scientists believe this frog breeds through larval development, like other frogs in Zhangixalus.

== Etymology ==
The name of the genus honors Zhang Ya-Ping from the Chinese Academy of Sciences, in recognition to his contributions to biodiversity and evolution research in China, in combination with ixalus, a common generic root for tree frogs.

== Original description ==
- C.-C. Liu; S.-Q. Hu (1962). "A herpetological report of Kwangsi". Acta Zoologica Sinica. 14 (Supplement): 73–104.
