= Zhangixalus hui =

Conservation status
- Least Concern (IUCN 3.1)

Scientific classification
- Kingdom: Animalia
- Phylum: Chordata
- Class: Amphibia
- Order: Anura
- Family: Rhacophoridae
- Genus: Zhangixalus
- Species: Z. hui

Binomial name
- Zhangixalus hui (Liu, 1945)

Synonyms
- Rhacophorus hui Liu, 1945; Polypedates zhaojuensis Wu & Zheng, 1994

Species of frog

Zhangixalus hui is a species of frog in the family Rhacophoridae. It is endemic to China.

Scientists used to think this was the same species as Rhacophorus dugritei, but they changed their minds in 2008.

This frog has been observed near marshes, bodies of water, and paddy fields between 3050 and 3350 meters above sea level. The female frog lays her eggs in foam nests in holes near water.

Scientists classify this frog as at least concern of extinction because of its large range. What threat there is comes from clear-cutting and tourism. Scientists cite climate change as a possible threat to this frog because of the associated droughts and floods.

== Etymology ==
The name of the genus honors Zhang Ya-Ping from the Chinese Academy of Sciences, in recognition to his contributions to biodiversity and evolution research in China, in combination with ixalus, a common generic root for tree frogs.
