= Zhangixalus hungfuensis =

Conservation status
- Endangered (IUCN 3.1)

Scientific classification
- Kingdom: Animalia
- Phylum: Chordata
- Class: Amphibia
- Order: Anura
- Family: Rhacophoridae
- Genus: Zhangixalus
- Species: Z. hungfuensis

Binomial name
- Zhangixalus hungfuensis (Liu and Hu, 1961)

Synonyms
- Rhacophorus hungfuensis Liu and Hu, 1961; Polypedates hungfuensis (Liu and Hu, 1961)

Species of frog

Zhangixalus hungfuensis is a species of frog in the family Rhacophoridae. It is found in southern China and northern Vietnam. Its natural habitats are subtropical or tropical moist lowland forests, subtropical or tropical moist montane forests, subtropical or tropical moist shrubland, rivers, and freshwater marshes.

This frog has been observed exclusively in Hongfoshan, between 800 and 1500 meters above sea level. The frogs breed in stream-fed pools, through larval development.

The IUCN classifies this frog as endangered because of its small range, which does not include any threat-defined locations. About 40% of this range is subject to earthquakes, which can cause landslides, which kill frogs and alter habitat. Infrastructure development can also pose a threat to this frog.

== Etymology ==
The name of the genus honors Zhang Ya-Ping from the Chinese Academy of Sciences, in recognition to his contributions to biodiversity and evolution research in China, in combination with ixalus, a common generic root for tree frogs.
