= Zhangixalus melanoleucus =

Scientific classification
- Kingdom: Animalia
- Phylum: Chordata
- Class: Amphibia
- Order: Anura
- Family: Rhacophoridae
- Genus: Zhangixalus
- Species: Z. melanoleucus

Binomial name
- Zhangixalus melanoleucus Brakels, Nguyen, Pawangkhanant, Idiiatullina, Lorphengsy, Suwannapoom, and Poyarkov, 2023

Species of frog

Zhangixalus melanoleucus, the Phou Samsoum tree frog, is a species of frog in the family Rhacophoridae. It is endemic to Laos's Xiengkhouang Province. Scientists know it exclusively from its type locality, Phou Samsoum Mountain, but they believe it may also live in other mountainous provinces of Laos and Vietnam.

== Etymology ==
The name of the genus honors Zhang Ya-Ping from the Chinese Academy of Sciences, in recognition to his contributions to biodiversity and evolution research in China, in combination with ixalus, a common generic root for treefrogs. The specific name melanoleucus comes from the Greek melaus meaning black and leukos meaning white and referring to the frog's black and white speckled belly.
