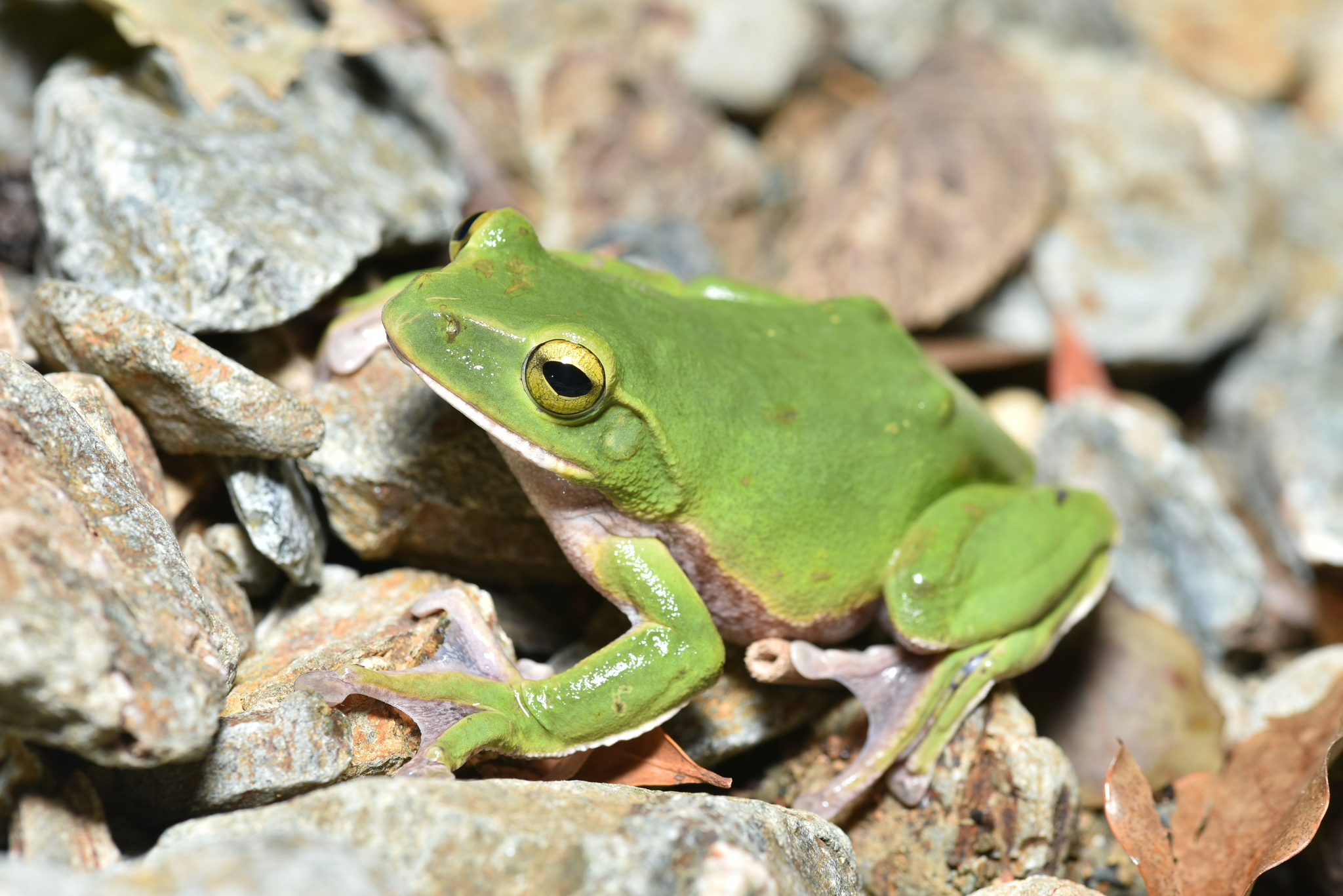

Conservation status
- Least Concern (IUCN 3.1)

Scientific classification
- Kingdom: Animalia
- Phylum: Chordata
- Class: Amphibia
- Order: Anura
- Family: Rhacophoridae
- Genus: Zhangixalus
- Species: Z. viridis

Binomial name
- Zhangixalus viridis (Hallowell, 1861)

Synonyms
- Polypedates viridis Hallowell, 1861; Rhacophorus viridis (Hallowell, 1861)

= Zhangixalus viridis =

Species of frog

Zhangixalus viridis (Okinawan green tree frog or green flying frog) is a species of frog in the family Rhacophoridae. It is endemic to the Ryukyu Islands, Japan, and known from Okinawa, Iheya and Kume Islands of the Okinawa Group. Zhangixalus amamiensis from the Amami Group was formerly included in this species as a subspecies.

Zhangixalus viridis is no longer present on Yoron Island. Its disappearance from the island sometime after 1958 is attributed to habitat change (conversion of paddy fields to drier habitats) and an introduced predator, the Japanese weasel (Mustela itatsi). This is the first island-level extinction of a native amphibian in the Ryukyu Archipelago during modern times.

Zhangixalus viridis is a moderate-sized rhacophorid frog (snout-vent length 65–84 mm (2.6–3.3 in)). The skin of the dorsum can be bright green or brown. There are disks on its toes for climbing. The ventrum is yellow or white in color.

It is a common species in forests close to paddy fields and wetlands. It breeds in wetlands and paddy fields by larval development. The adult frog makes a bubble foam near the end of the water in a rice paddy, marsh, or other body of water. The male frog sometimes digs a hole for the eggs. When the eggs hatch, the foam turns into liquid. The liquid flows into the paddy or pool, bringing the tadpoles with it.

The tadpoles can be 40 mm or even 50 mm long. Tadpoles have a long tail with small spots on it. The young froglets are 17–19 mm long in snout-vent length.

== Etymology ==
The name of the genus honors Zhang Ya-Ping from the Chinese Academy of Sciences, in recognition to his contributions to biodiversity and evolution research in China, in combination with ixalus, a common generic root for treefrogs. The specific name is classical latin meaning verdant in reference to the frog's coloration.
