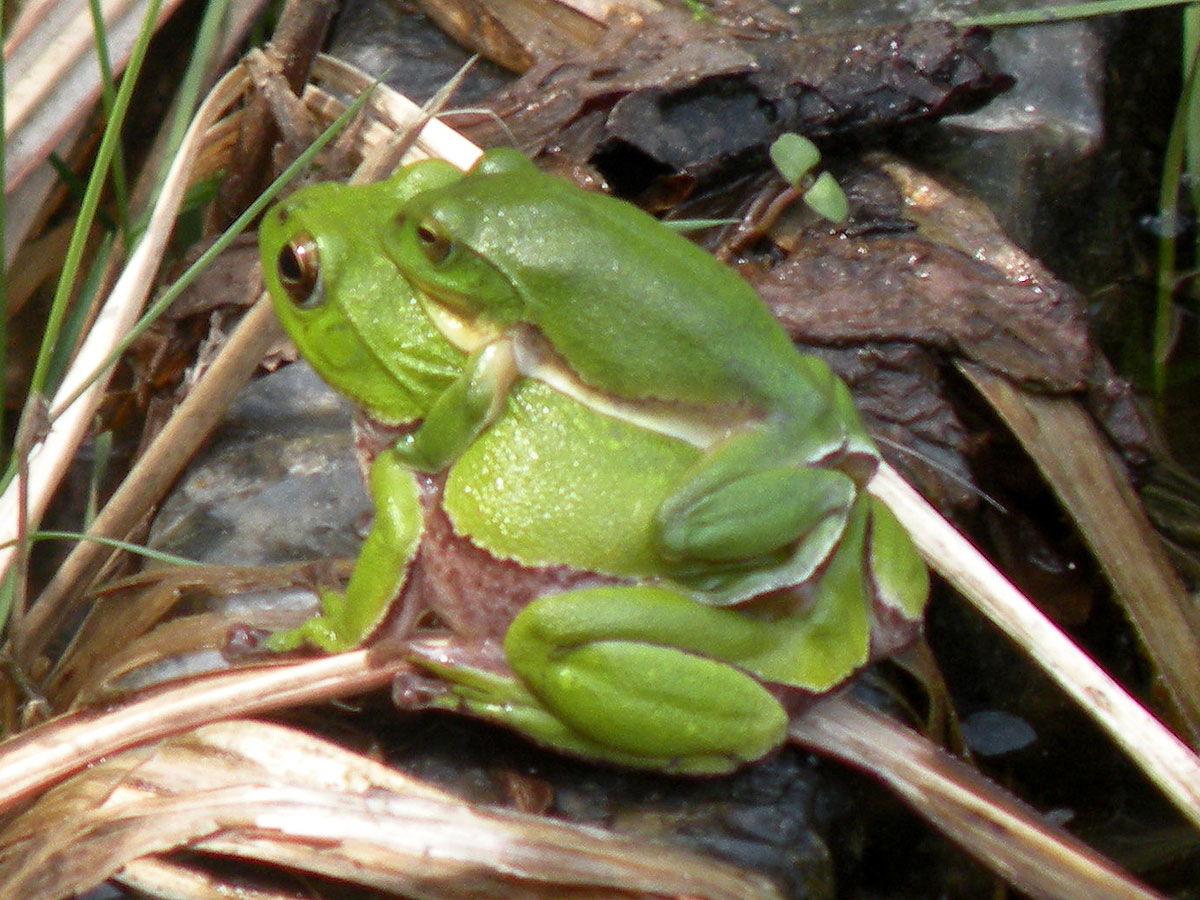

Conservation status
- Least Concern (IUCN 3.1)

Scientific classification
- Kingdom: Animalia
- Phylum: Chordata
- Class: Amphibia
- Order: Anura
- Family: Rhacophoridae
- Genus: Zhangixalus
- Species: Z. schlegelii

Binomial name
- Zhangixalus schlegelii (Günther, 1858)

Synonyms
- Polypedates schlegelii Günther, 1858; Rhacophorus microglossus Boulenger, 1882; Rhacophorus schlegelii (Günther, 1858)

= Zhangixalus schlegelii =

Species of frog

Zhangixalus schlegelii (common names: Japanese gliding frog, Schlegel's green tree frog, Schlegel's flying frog, Schlegel's tree frog) is a species of frog in the family Rhacophoridae. It is endemic to Japan and found in Honshu, Shikoku, Kyushu as well as the Ryukyu Islands. It is named after Hermann Schlegel, a 19th-century German zoologist.

== Description ==
Males measure 32–43 mm (1.3–1.7 in) and females 43–53 mm (1.7–2.1 in) in snout–vent length. The males have yellowish white nuptial pads, darkly colored throat, and a pair of slit-like vocal openings. The webbing of the fingers and toes is not well developed; the finger tips have truncated discs with circummarginal grooves. The dorsal skin is almost completely smooth. The supra-tympanic fold is prominent, but there is no dorsolateral fold.

== Reproduction ==
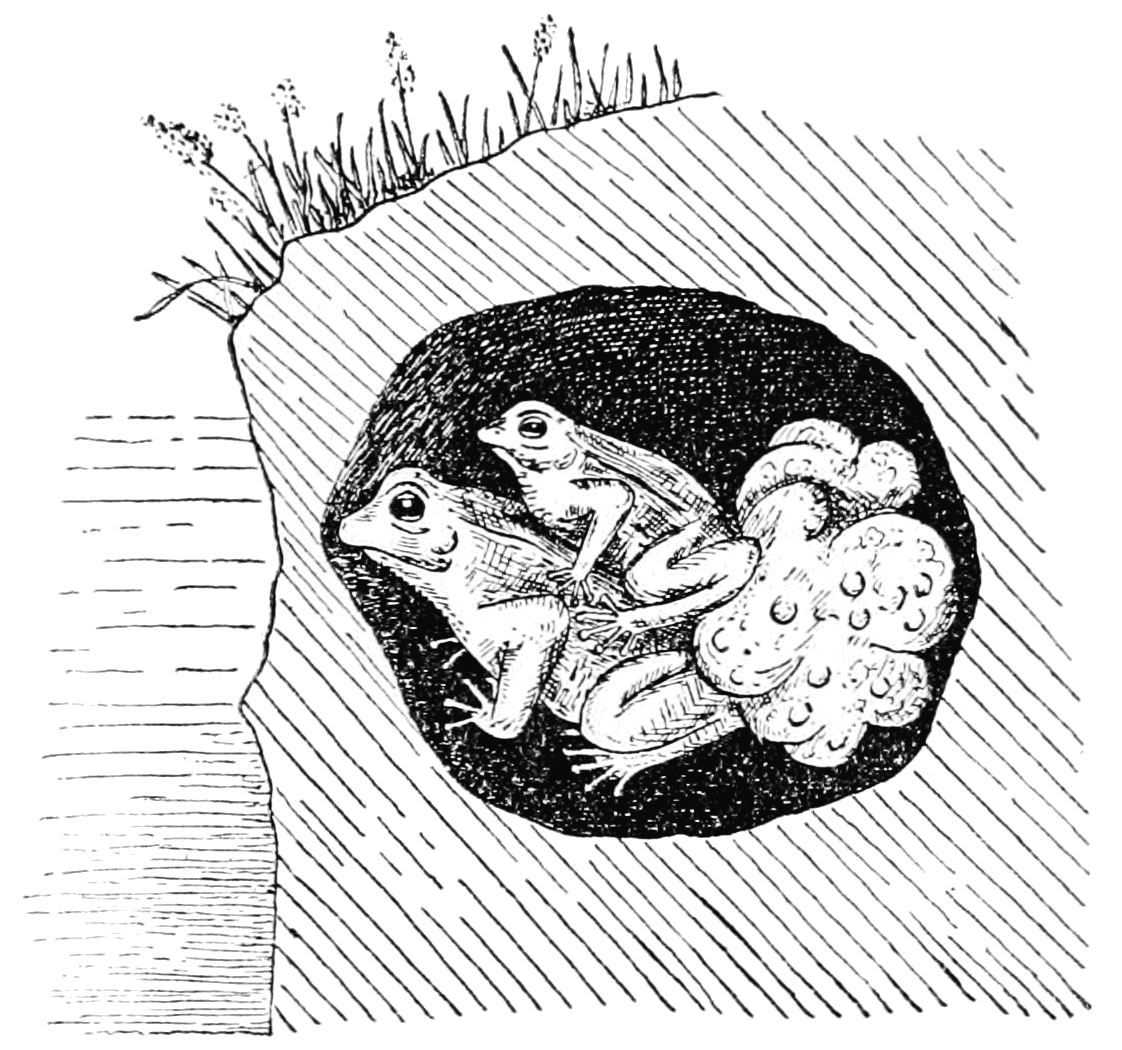
Female (bottom) and male (top) in their underground nest.

Rhacophorus schlegelii breed in underground foam nests:

In Japan there is also a nest-making frog which is said to lay its eggs sometimes amongst leaves on bushes or trees. However, its usual habit is to make a nest in the ground as indicated in Fig. 3. Awakening from their winter sleep, the frogs crawl along the edges of rice fields and swamps and dig out holes above the water level. The female carries the much smaller male, and both become buried in a hole 6–9 cm. wide and 10–15 cm. above the surface of the water. This nest cavity is smoothed inside by the movements of the female and is then, in the night, supplied with a ball of white matter full of air-bubbles. This is tough and elastic and 6–7 cm. thick. This mass is to supply moisture and air for the young. It emerges from the cloaca along with the eggs, and is then kneaded thoroughly by remarkable movements of the feet of the female. Stretching out and closing the toes, she mixes the sticky mass with air and breaks the big bubbles up into smaller and smaller foam. Similar movements of the feet of the male drive the mass backward and leave the eggs more free for the fertilization that follows. When the eggs have been fertilized and provided with a protecting and aerating mass, the parents break out from the nest and take up their life amongst the trees. The foam mass meanwhile gradually becomes liquid, and flowing out through the hole the parents left on leaving the nest, carries the young into the outside water.

== Habitat and conservation ==
It occurs in temperate wetlands and forests from hilly areas to lowland areas, especially in paddy fields, which are its main breeding place. It is not considered threatened by the International Union for Conservation of Nature (IUCN).

== Etymology ==
The name of the genus honors Zhang Ya-Ping from the Chinese Academy of Sciences, in recognition to his contributions to biodiversity and evolution research in China, in combination with ixalus, a common generic root for treefrogs. The specific name honors the 19th-century German ornithologist, herpetologist and ichthyologist Hermann Schlegel.
