= Zhangixalus faritsalhadii =

Scientific classification
- Kingdom: Animalia
- Phylum: Chordata
- Class: Amphibia
- Order: Anura
- Family: Rhacophoridae
- Genus: Zhangixalus
- Species: Z. faritsalhadii

Binomial name
- Zhangixalus faritsalhadii Gonggoli, Munir, Kaprawi, Kirschey & Hamidy, 2024

Species of amphibian

Zhangixalus faritsalhadii is a tree frog from Mount Slamet, Java, Indonesia. The frog has a yellowish-green dorsum with numerous spots and irregular blotches around its head.

== Etymology ==
The name of the genus honors Zhang Ya-Ping from the Chinese Academy of Sciences, in recognition to his contributions to biodiversity and evolution research in China, in combination with ixalus, a common generic root for treefrogs. The specific name is in honor of Farits Alhadi, the herpetologist who collected the first known specimen of this species.
