= Zhangixalus achantharrhena =

Conservation status
- Least Concern (IUCN 3.1)

Scientific classification
- Kingdom: Animalia
- Phylum: Chordata
- Class: Amphibia
- Order: Anura
- Family: Rhacophoridae
- Genus: Zhangixalus
- Species: Z. achantharrhena

Binomial name
- Zhangixalus achantharrhena (Harvey, Pemberton, and Smith, 2002)

Synonyms
- Rhacophorus achantharrhena Harvey, Pemberton, and Smith, 2002

Species of frog

Zhangixalus achantharrhena is a species of frog in the family Rhacophoridae. It is endemic to Sumatra (Indonesia) and known from a number of high-elevation localities ranging from Aceh in the northwest to Lampung in the southeast.

== Description ==
Males grow to 41 mm (1.6 in) and females (based on a single specimen) to 47 mm (1.9 in) in snout–vent length. In males, the snout is sloping in lateral view and acuminate in dorsal view with a slightly spatulate tip. In the female, the snout is more rounded. The tympanum is distinct but its upper edge is hidden by the thick and conspicuous supratympanic fold. The fingers and toes are webbed and bear terminal discs. The dorsum is smooth in the female but finely spiculate in males. Dorsal coloration is bright green with reddish spots (lighter in some specimens). The dorsal surfaces of the digits, dermal appendages on the limbs and above the vent, and the lower lip are yellowish white. The venter and gular region are bright yellow. Webbing between the toes 3–5 is red but green between the other toes and the fingers.

== Habitat and conservation ==
Zhangixalus achantharrhena is known from secondary growth tropical forest where it was found in overhanging vegetation close to pools and slow-flowing streams and from close to tea plantations. Reproduction probably involves foam nests in vegetation overhanging water and aquatic tadpoles. Its elevational range is 1,415–1,575 m (4,642–5,167 ft) above sea level. It can be locally common. However, habitat loss caused by smallholder farming and subsistence collection of wood is threatening this species. It occurs in the Kerinci Seblat National Park, but habitat loss occurs also in the park.

== Etymology ==
The name of the genus honors Zhang Ya-Ping from the Chinese Academy of Sciences, in recognition to his contributions to biodiversity and evolution research in China, in combination with ixalus, a common generic root for tree frogs. The specific name achantharrhena, from the Greek nouns akantha (thorn or prickle) and arrhen (male), refers to a characteristic of males of this species: skin covered by tiny spicules.
