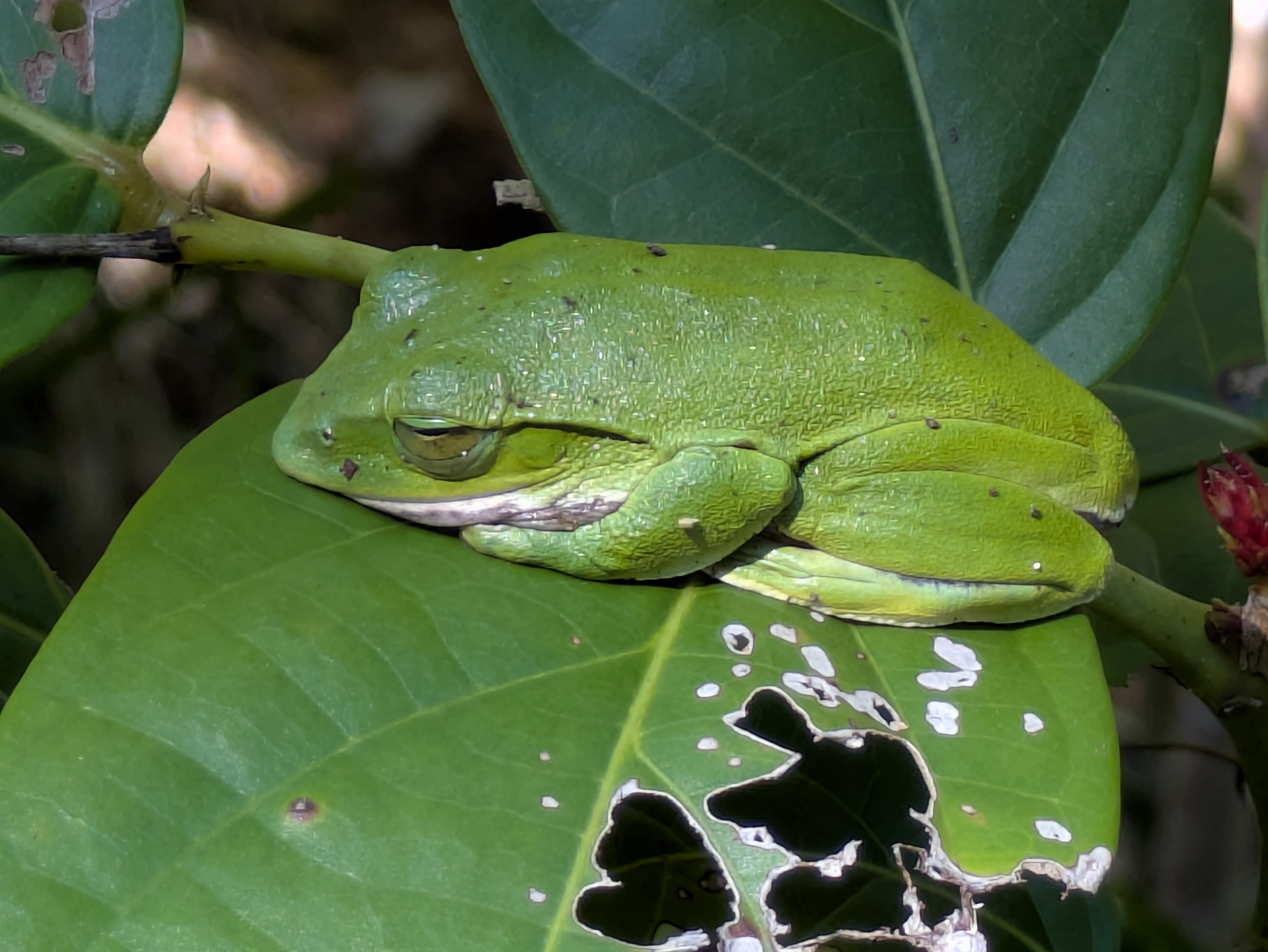

Conservation status
- Least Concern (IUCN 3.1)

Scientific classification
- Kingdom: Animalia
- Phylum: Chordata
- Class: Amphibia
- Order: Anura
- Family: Rhacophoridae
- Genus: Zhangixalus
- Species: Z. amamiensis

Binomial name
- Zhangixalus amamiensis (Inger, 1947)

Synonyms
- Rhacophorus schlegelii amamiensis Inger, 1947; Rhacophorus viridis amamiensis Inger, 1947

= Zhangixalus amamiensis =

Species of frog

Zhangixalus amamiensis, the Amami green tree frog, is a species of frog in the family Rhacophoridae. It is endemic to Japan. Scientists had classified it as a subspecies of Rhacophorus viridis but reevaluated it in 2019.

This frog has been observed between 50 and 650 meters above sea level, in forests near paddy fields and other wetlands. It breeds in those fields and wetlands by larval development.

This frog has appeared in the international pet trade.

The IUCN classifies this frog as at least concern of extinction because of its large range, which includes some protected parks.

== Etymology ==
The name of the genus honors Zhang Ya-Ping from the Chinese Academy of Sciences, in recognition to his contributions to biodiversity and evolution research in China, in combination with ixalus, a common generic root for tree frogs. The specific name amamiensis refers to the islands, Amami, which the frog is endemic to.
