= Zhangixalus lishuiensis =

Conservation status
- Data Deficient (IUCN 3.1)

Scientific classification
- Kingdom: Animalia
- Phylum: Chordata
- Class: Amphibia
- Order: Anura
- Family: Rhacophoridae
- Genus: Zhangixalus
- Species: Z. lishuiensis

Binomial name
- Zhangixalus lishuiensis (Liu, Wang and Jiang, 2017)

Synonyms
- Rhacophorus lishuiensis Liu, Wang and Jiang, 2017

Species of frog

Zhangixalus lishuiensis is a species of frog in the family Rhacophoridae. Scientists know it exclusively from the type locality: Fengyang Forest Station in Zhejiang Province, China. It has been observed 1100 meters above sea level.

People have seen this frog in montaine forests with mixed evergreen and deciduous trees. The male frogs dig holes near the roots of Jiaobai plants by the water's edge, such that the openings are underwater. The frogs must swim to enter. The female frogs lay their eggs in these burrows, but egg sacs have occasionally been seen on the stems of the Jiaobai plants or on the water.

The IUCN classifies this frog as data deficient, but scientists believe the population is stable.

== Etymology ==
The name of the genus honors Zhang Ya-Ping from the Chinese Academy of Sciences, in recognition to his contributions to biodiversity and evolution research in China, in combination with ixalus, a common generic root for tree frogs.

== Original publication ==
- Liu B-Q; Y-F Wang; K Jiang; H-M Chen; J-J Zhou; J-N Xu; C-H Wu (2017). "A new treefrog species of the genus Rhacophorus found in Zhejiang, China (Anura: Rhacophoridae)". Chinese Journal of Zoology (Abstract). 52: 361–372. Archived from the original on October 26, 2020.
