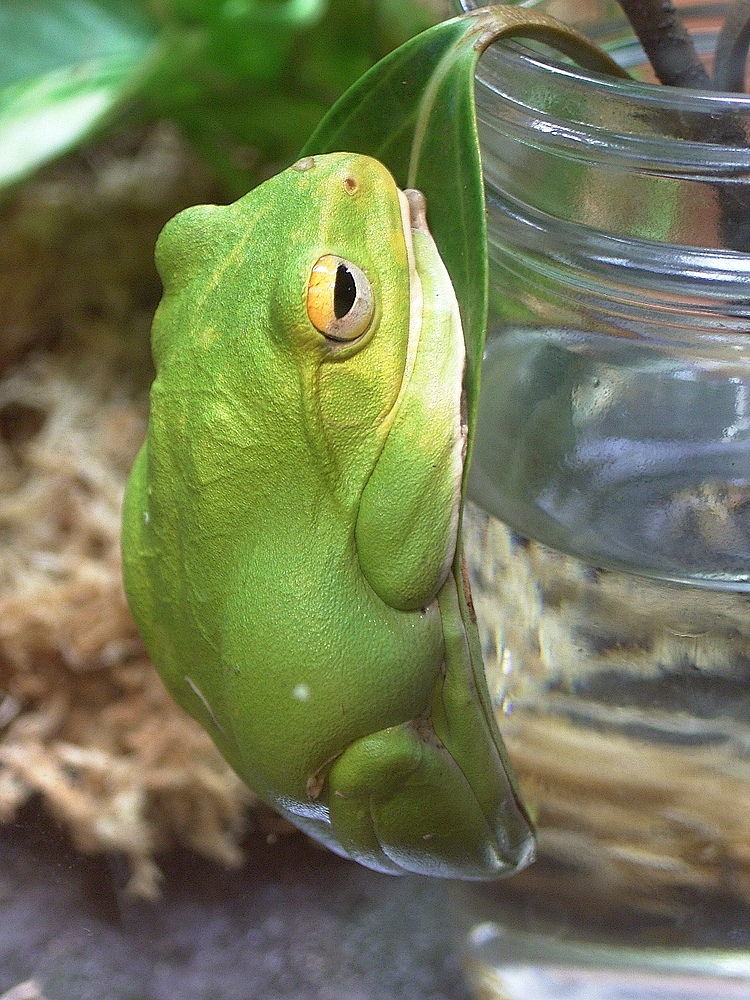

Conservation status
- Near Threatened (IUCN 3.1)

Scientific classification
- Kingdom: Animalia
- Phylum: Chordata
- Class: Amphibia
- Order: Anura
- Family: Rhacophoridae
- Genus: Zhangixalus
- Species: Z. owstoni

Binomial name
- Zhangixalus owstoni (Stejneger, 1907)

Synonyms
- Rhacophorus owstoni (Stejneger, 1907)

= Zhangixalus owstoni =

Species of amphibian

Zhangixalus owstoni or Owston's green tree frog is a species of frog in the family Rhacophoridae which is endemic to Japan. Its natural habitats are subtropical or tropical moist lowland forests, subtropical or tropical seasonally wet or flooded lowland grassland, intermittent freshwater marshes, and irrigated land. It is threatened by habitat loss. The population is currently stable.

The adult male frog is about 42–51 mm long from nose to rear end and the adult female frog is about 50–67 mm long. There is not much webbing on the feet.

This frog can survive in a variety of habitats but seems to prefer forests and an arboreal lifestyle. But when it is time to reproduce, the frogs go to grasslands and wetlands. This frog has been observed 20 and 450 meters above sea level.

The IUCN classifies this frog as near threatened. The island chain to which it is endemic underwent significant changes during and after World War II. Its range does include one protected park: Iriomote Ishigaki National Park on Iriomote Island. On other islands, habitat degradation principally involves conversion of land to agriculture.

== Etymology ==
The name of the genus honors Zhang Ya-Ping from the Chinese Academy of Sciences, in recognition to his contributions to biodiversity and evolution research in China, in combination with ixalus, a common generic root for treefrogs. The specific name honours the notable wildlife collector Alan Owston.
