= Zhangixalus omeimontis =

Conservation status
- Least Concern (IUCN 3.1)

Scientific classification
- Kingdom: Animalia
- Phylum: Chordata
- Class: Amphibia
- Order: Anura
- Family: Rhacophoridae
- Genus: Zhangixalus
- Species: Z. omeimontis

Binomial name
- Zhangixalus omeimontis (Stejneger, 1924)

Synonyms
- Polypedates omeimontis Stejneger, 1924; Rhacophorus omeimontis (Stejneger, 1924)

Species of frog

Zhangixalus omeimontis is a species of frog in the family Rhacophoridae endemic to China. Its common name is Omei whipping frog or Omei treefrog, in reference to its type locality, Mount Emei (Chinese: 峨嵋山; pinyin: Éméi Shān; Wade–Giles: O^{2}-mei^{2} Shan^{1}) in Sichuan. It is found in southern and central China in Yunnan, Sichuan, Guangxi, Guizhou, Hunan, and Hubei provinces. It has been observed between 200 and 700 meters above sea level. It is a relatively common frog that inhabits forests, and sometimes farmland. It breeds in still water (pools and ponds). Agriculture and logging are threats to this species.

== Description ==
Zhangixalus omeimontis are moderately large frogs: males grow to a snout–vent length of about 59 mm (2.3 in) and females to 76 mm (3.0 in). Maximum sizes can be even higher, reaching at least 70 mm (2.8 in) in males and 84 mm (3.3 in) in females. They tend to be bigger and older at cooler sites (i.e., at higher altitudes). Maximum age is at least eight years.

Tadpoles are up to 45 mm (1.8 in) in length.

== Reproduction ==
Zhangixalus omeimontis breed between mid-April and late July. Breeding takes place during night-time. Males arrive before females, climbing in the vegetation close to a pond and calling while perched on stems or leaves. When a male spots an approaching female, it approaches the female and clasps her. The pair then moves to oviposition site above the pond. The female then makes a foam nest while the pair is in amplexus. In addition to the first male, several other males may join, forming a spawning group. The primary male often leaves the female before she has spawned all her eggs.

Clutch size is several hundred eggs, with one study finding a range of 457–837 eggs. Eggs diameter is about 3 mm (0.12 in); diameter and clutch size are negatively correlated (big clutches tend to contain smaller eggs). Eggs hatch after about 12 to 17 days. The eggs are placed on upper leaf surfaces, facilitating the washing of tadpoles into breeding ponds by rainfall.

== Etymology ==
The name of the genus honors Zhang Ya-Ping from the Chinese Academy of Sciences, in recognition to his contributions to biodiversity and evolution research in China, in combination with ixalus, a common generic root for treefrogs. The specific name is in reference to its type locality, Mount Emei in Sichuan
