= Zhangixalus yunnanensis =

Scientific classification
- Kingdom: Animalia
- Phylum: Chordata
- Class: Amphibia
- Order: Anura
- Family: Rhacophoridae
- Genus: Zhangixalus
- Species: Z. yunnanensis

Binomial name
- Zhangixalus yunnanensis Pan, Hou, Yu & Liu 2024

Species of amphibian

Zhangixalus yunnanensis is a tree frog endemic to Yunnan, China first described in 2024. The frog's type locality is Mopan Mountain, Xinping, Yunnan, China.

== Etymology ==
The name of the genus honors Zhang Ya-Ping from the Chinese Academy of Sciences, in recognition to his contributions to biodiversity and evolution research in China, in combination with ixalus, a common generic root for treefrogs. The specific name is in reference to Yunnan, China where the species was first observed and categorized.
