= Zhangixalus franki =

Conservation status
- Data Deficient (IUCN 3.1)

Scientific classification
- Kingdom: Animalia
- Phylum: Chordata
- Class: Amphibia
- Order: Anura
- Family: Rhacophoridae
- Genus: Zhangixalus
- Species: Z. franki

Binomial name
- Zhangixalus franki Ninh, Nguyen, Orlov, Nguyen, and Ziegler, 2020

Species of frog

Zhangixalus franki, or Frank's tree frog, is a species of frog in the family Rhacophoridae. It has been reported in China, in Yunnan Province, and in northern Vietnam, between 1320 and 1360 m above sea level.

The adult male frog measures approximately 77.9–85.8 mm in snout-vent length.

This frog has been observed near small ponds in undisturbed evergreen forests between 1320 and 1680 meters above sea level. Scientists believe the frog breeds through larval development, like other frogs in Zhangixalus, but the eggs and tadpoles have yet to be observed directly.

The principal threats to this frog are habitat loss associated with small-scale agriculture and logging

== Etymology ==
The name of the genus honors Zhang Ya-Ping from the Chinese Academy of Sciences, in recognition to his contributions to biodiversity and evolution research in China, in combination with ixalus, a common generic root for tree frogs.
