= Zhangixalus dugritei =

Conservation status
- Least Concern (IUCN 3.1)

Scientific classification
- Kingdom: Animalia
- Phylum: Chordata
- Class: Amphibia
- Order: Anura
- Family: Rhacophoridae
- Genus: Zhangixalus
- Species: Z. dugritei

Binomial name
- Zhangixalus dugritei (David, 1872)

Synonyms
- Polypedates dugritei David, 1872; Rhacophorus dugritei (David, 1872)

Species of frog

Zhangixalus dugritei is a species of frog in the family Rhacophoridae found in China and Vietnam, and possibly Laos and Myanmar. Its natural habitats are temperate forests, subtropical or tropical moist montane forests, subtropical or tropical seasonally wet or flooded lowland grassland, freshwater marshes, intermittent freshwater marshes, rural gardens, and heavily degraded former forests.

These frogs have been observed in high-elevation forests and grasslands places high on mountains. They lay eggs in permanent and temporary pools and ponds. The female frogs build white foam nests in a mud caves and under moss or other plants. After the eggs hatch, the rain washes the tadpoles into the water. The tadpoles live at the bottom of the pond or pool and are rarely seen on the surface. The frog has been observed between 1400 and 3200 meters above sea level.

The IUCN classifies this species as at least concern of extinction. Its range includes many protected parks, not limited to Vietnam's Hoàng Liên National Park and Tay Con Linh II National Park. What threat exists comes from deforestation associated with agriculture and logging. Sometimes people catch this frog to eat.

== Etymology ==
The name of the genus honors Zhang Ya-Ping from the Chinese Academy of Sciences, in recognition to his contributions to biodiversity and evolution research in China, in combination with ixalus, a common generic root for tree frogs.
