= Zhangixalus jodiae =

Scientific classification
- Kingdom: Animalia
- Phylum: Chordata
- Class: Amphibia
- Order: Anura
- Family: Rhacophoridae
- Genus: Zhangixalus
- Species: Z. jodiae

Binomial name
- Zhangixalus jodiae Nguyen, Ninh, Orlov, Nguyen, and Ziegler, 2020
- Zhangixalus jodiae is only known from the Quản Bạ District in northeastern Vietnam

Species of amphibian

Zhangixalus jodiae, also known as Jodi's treefrog, is a species of frog in the family Rhacophoridae. It is named in honour of Jodi Rowley, Australian herpetologist, for her "great contribution to amphibian taxonomy in Asia". Zhangixalus jodiae is endemic to northeastern Vietnam and is only known from the vicinity of its type locality in Quản Bạ District, Hà Giang Province. It belongs to a clade of Zhangixalus inhabiting karst forests of southern China and northern Vietnam.

== Description ==
Adult males measure 36–40 mm (1.4–1.6 in) in snout–vent length; females and tadpoles are unknown. The body is robust. The head is moderately compressed, as long as it is wide. The snout is round anteriorly and slightly protruding in lateral view. The tympanum is round and distinct; supratympanic fold is also distinct. The fingers and toes are webbed and bear enlarged terminal discs. Skin is smooth, except for the belly and the ventral surfaces of fore and hind limbs that are granular. The dorsal surfaces are green. The flanks are cream; the axilla and groin have large black blotches. The chest and the belly are cream, while the lower jaw and throat region are greyish. The iris is silver and the pupil is black and horizontal. Males have a single, external subgular vocal sac.

The male advertisement call lasts about one second and consists of six notes, each about 6 ms in duration. The dominant frequency is 2.0 kHz.

== Habitat ==
Zhangixalus jodiae is known from an undisturbed limestone karst forest at elevations between 1,180 and 1,320 m (3,870 and 4,330 ft) above sea level. The specimens were found on the ground near streams.

== Conservation ==
As of November 2021, this species has not been included in the IUCN Red List of Threatened Species. While the presently known range of Zhangixalus jodiae is very restricted, Nguyen and colleagues suggest that it should be considered "data deficient" because its actual distribution remains unknown.

== Etymology ==
The name of the genus honors Zhang Ya-Ping from the Chinese Academy of Sciences, in recognition to his contributions to biodiversity and evolution research in China, in combination with ixalus, a common generic root for tree frogs. The specific name jarujini honours Jarujin Nabhitabhata from the National Science Museum of Thailand.
