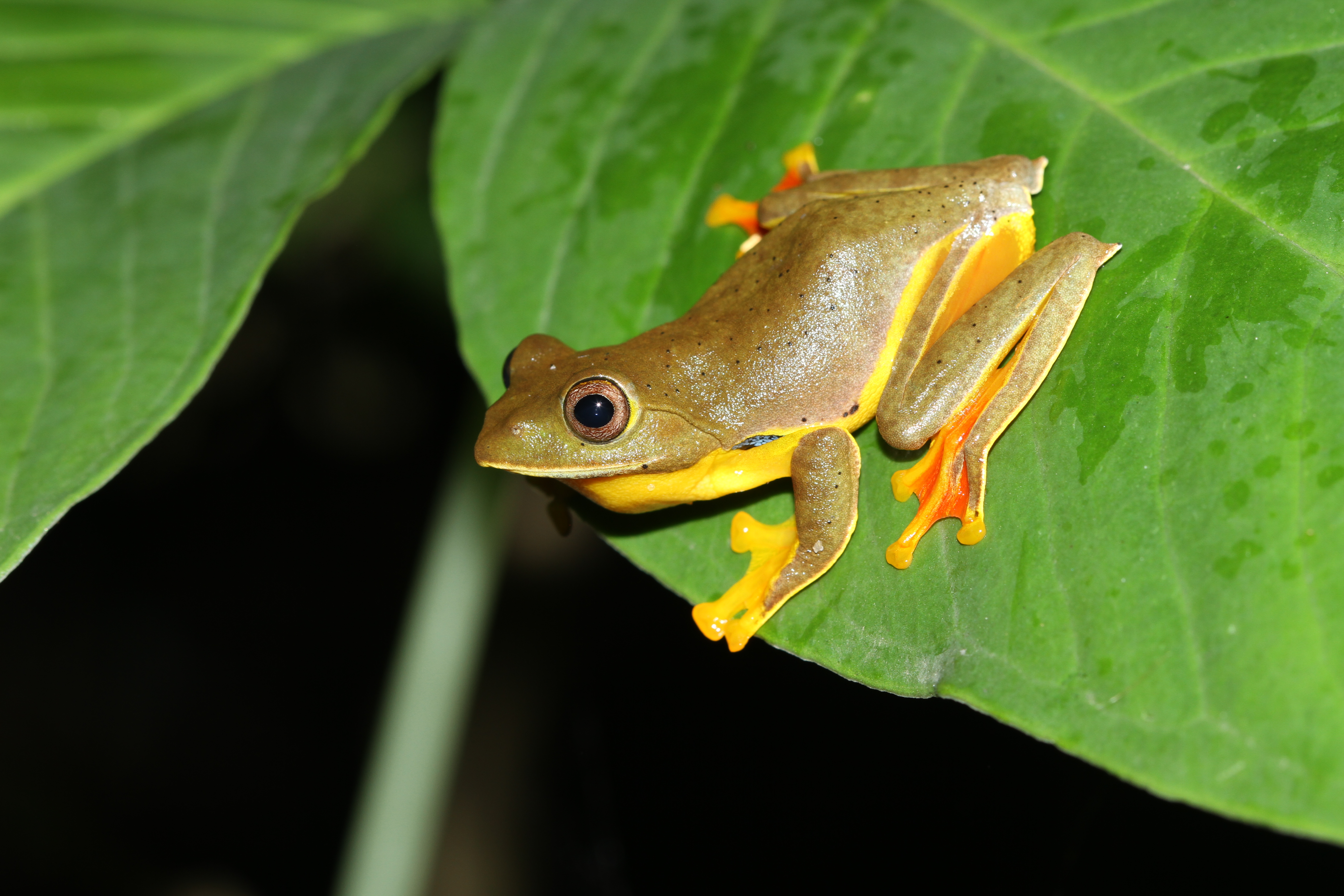

Conservation status
- Least Concern (IUCN 3.1)

Scientific classification
- Kingdom: Animalia
- Phylum: Chordata
- Class: Amphibia
- Order: Anura
- Family: Rhacophoridae
- Genus: Rhacophorus
- Species: R. bipunctatus

Binomial name
- Rhacophorus bipunctatus Ahl, 1927

Synonyms
- Rhacophorus bimaculatus Boulenger, 1882 (non Peters, 1867: preoccupied); Rhacophorus htunwini Wilkinson, Thin, Lwin & Shein, 2005; Rhacophorus maculatus Anderson, 1871 (non J.E.Gray, 1830: preoccupied)

= Rhacophorus bipunctatus =

Species of amphibian

In sources published from 1999 onwards, the name Rhacophorus bipunctatus can also refer to R. rhodopus (see "Taxonomy" section).

Rhacophorus bipunctatus is a frog species in the moss frog family (Rhacophoridae) found from eastern India into Southeast Asia, possibly to southeastern China and south to Malaysia. Due to the identification problems surrounding this species, the eastern and southern limits of its range remain undetermined; all that is known is that the species certainly occurs in the border region of India, Bangladesh, China and Myanmar; its range might extend south to Malaysia, as similar frogs have been reported from Pahang.

This species is notable for having a highly confusing taxonomy, discussed in detail in the Taxonomy section below. It had its scientific name changed twice, was described under different names two times and more than 130 years apart, and has had a second species confused with it. Only in 2007, some degree of certainty about what kind of frog to which the name R. bipunctatus actually applies was achieved.

== Description ==
R. bipunctatus is a smallish tree frog with a pointed snout and body length of about 37–60 mm when adult, with females being larger than males. Its back is intensely green to violet-brown in living animals; in preserved specimens, this becomes blue to violet. No conspicuous pattern is visible on the back, though there may be a few tiny whitish and/or dark speckles. The arms and legs have very faint darker bands. The sides, belly and toes are brilliant yellow, becoming dull pink in preserved specimens. Behind the arms, there is almost always a conspicuous large black spot on the flanks; towards the hind legs there may be another one or two such spots, but very rarely the flank spots are absent entirely. The well-developed webbing of the toes is bright orange-red and not spotted, becoming whitish in preserved specimens. The eyes are dull green, sometimes with yellow rims.

It can be distinguished from R. rhodopus, with which it was long confused, by the larger size (R. rhodopus has a body length of about 31–55 mm) and unspotted back with at least some trace of green or olive, often being entirely green (R. rhodopus has a reddish-brownish back with darker spots and lacks greenish hues). In individuals of similar size, R. bipunctatus has a much larger head.

== Ecology and status ==
Its natural habitats are subtropical or tropical moist montane forests, subtropical or tropical high-altitude shrubland, intermittent rivers, freshwater marshes, intermittent freshwater marshes, plantations and rural gardens. It is known from altitudes of several hundreds of meters ASL to more than 2,000 meters ASL; it is unclear whether this species is ever found in the lowlands.

The IUCN classified R. bipunctatus as a Species of Least Concern in 2004. However, they include R. rhodopus under the name. It is not known whether the true R. bipunctatus occurs across the whole of Southeast Asia like R. rhodopus; the available data indicate it is only known with certainty from a rather restricted area in the hills and mountains of the India-China-Myanmar border region, but the status of the similar frogs from Pahang in Malaysia needs to be determined. Therefore, it is probably most appropriate to consider this frog a Data Deficient species. Indeed, R. htunwini – a junior synonym of R. bipunctatus as it seems – was in fact evaluated as Data Deficient by the IUCN in 2006 for precisely these reasons.

== Taxonomy ==
This frog has a highly convoluted taxonomy, even by the standards of the taxonomically confusing genus Rhacophorus. Believed at its discovery in 1870 to represent a population of the black-webbed tree frog (Rhacophorus reinwardtii), it was first described in 1871 as R. maculatus by John Anderson. His five syntypes, from the Khasi Hills in India, were placed in the ZSI collection, with the numbers 2753, 2754, 2755, 2756, and 10291; seven other Khasi Hills specimens collected by Thomas C. Jerdon were deposited in the NMH and are also considered part of the syntypical series because they were referred to in Anderson's description. The ZSI specimens might subsequently have become lost; NMH specimen 1872.4.17.127, collected by Jerdon in 1870, was designated a lectotype in 2007.

=== Multiple homonyms ===
However, Polypedates maculatus, originally described by John E. Gray as Hyla maculata some decades earlier was known as Rhacophorus maculatus in the late 19th century. Thus it was a senior homonym, preoccupying Anderson's name.

This was soon noticed and in 1882, George A. Boulenger proposed R. bimaculatus as a new name for Anderson's frogs. But in 1927, Ernst Ahl realized the frog described by Wilhelm Peters as Leptomantis bimaculata in 1867 was also a member of Rhacophorus and thus Boulenger's replacement name was also preoccupied. Ahl solved the issue by establishing the currently valid name, Rhacophorus bipunctatus, for the frog species that had first come to the notice of scientists 50 years earlier.

=== R. rhodopus and R. htunwini ===
Often, R. rhodopus (described in 1960) is considered a junior synonym of the present species. However, when proposing this synonymy in 1999, neither the holotypes nor verified specimen from the type locality were examined. In fact, the alleged specimens of R. bipunctatus were from localities where that species is not known to occur. When the appropriate comparisons were finally done almost 10 years later, it turned out the R. rhodopus actually refers to the frogs described as R. namdaphaensis in 1985, which therefore is properly known by the older name R. rhodopus.

This confusion has had further consequences. In 2005, a moss frog similar to R. rhodopus – then known as R. bipunctatus and R. namdaphaensis – was described as Htun Win's tree frog (Rhacophorus htunwini). But the describers believed that the taxon R. rhodopus was a junior synonym of R. bipunctatus; therefore, they compared the new species only with misidentified R. rhodopus, but not with the actual R. bipunctatus. That was still fortuitous, however, as they did not compare their "new" species to frogs assigned to the taxon R. namdaphaensis (as they might have wanted to, given the similarities and close geographic proximity). In any case, this situation was resolved in 2007, when the differences between R. htunwini and the original R. bipunctatus were found to be too slight and varied too much between individuals to consider the former anything but a junior synonym of the latter.

Thus, the failure to compare R. rhodopus with the original type specimens of R. bipunctatus led to the long-known species being described once again under a new name, more than 130 years after it first became known to science. There are still a few doubts regarding the taxonomy of all these frogs, given they look quite similar and are partly sympatric. Ancient DNA sequence analyses of the original type specimens would be necessary to resolve the remaining questions.
