= Zhangixalus yaoshanensis =

Conservation status
- Near Threatened (IUCN 3.1)

Scientific classification
- Kingdom: Animalia
- Phylum: Chordata
- Class: Amphibia
- Order: Anura
- Family: Rhacophoridae
- Genus: Zhangixalus
- Species: Z. yaoshanensis

Binomial name
- Zhangixalus yaoshanensis (Liu & Hu, 1962)

Synonyms
- Rhacophorus yaoshanensis Liu & Hu, 1962; Polypedates yaoshanensis (Liu & Hu, 1962)

Species of frog

Zhangixalus yaoshanensis is a species of frog in the family Rhacophoridae. It is endemic to China, where its type locality is Dayao Mountain, Jinxiu County, Guangxi Province.

Its natural habitats are subtropical or tropical moist lowland forests and subtropical or tropical moist montane forests. This frog has been observed between 800 and 1500 meters above sea level. It usually lives near permanent bodies of water.

Scientists believe this frog breeds by larval development in water.

The IUCN classifies this frog as near threatened because, while people entering the forests to collect wood was a serious problem in the early 2000s, the practice had declined significantly by the early 2020s. The frog's range includes a protected park: Dayaoshan Nature Reserve.

== Etymology ==
The name of the genus honors Zhang Ya-Ping from the Chinese Academy of Sciences, in recognition to his contributions to biodiversity and evolution research in China, in combination with ixalus, a common generic root for treefrogs. The frog's specific name is in reference to its type locality on Dayao Mountain, Jinxiu County, Guangxi Province.
