= Zhangixalus chenfui =

Conservation status
- Least Concern (IUCN 3.1)

Scientific classification
- Kingdom: Animalia
- Phylum: Chordata
- Class: Amphibia
- Order: Anura
- Family: Rhacophoridae
- Genus: Zhangixalus
- Species: Z. chenfui

Binomial name
- Zhangixalus chenfui (Liu, 1945)

Synonyms
- Polypedates chenfui (Liu, 1945); Rhacophorus chenfui Liu, 1945

Species of amphibian

Zhangixalus chenfui, also known as Chinese whipping frog or Chenfu's treefrog, is a species of frog in the family Rhacophoridae endemic to China where it is found in Sichuan, Guizhou, Hubei, and Fujian provinces. It has been observed between 900 and 3000 meters above sea level.

This frog lives in creeks, streams, paddy fields, ditches, and nearby areas. It lives in places near water, like forests and in the shrubbery of hills. This frog's range includes many protected parks.

The IUCN classifies this frog as not in danger of extinction. What threat it faces comes from habitat loss associated with agriculture and infrastructure.

== Etymology ==
The name of the genus honors Zhang Ya-Ping from the Chinese Academy of Sciences, in recognition to his contributions to biodiversity and evolution research in China, in combination with ixalus, a common generic root for tree frogs.
