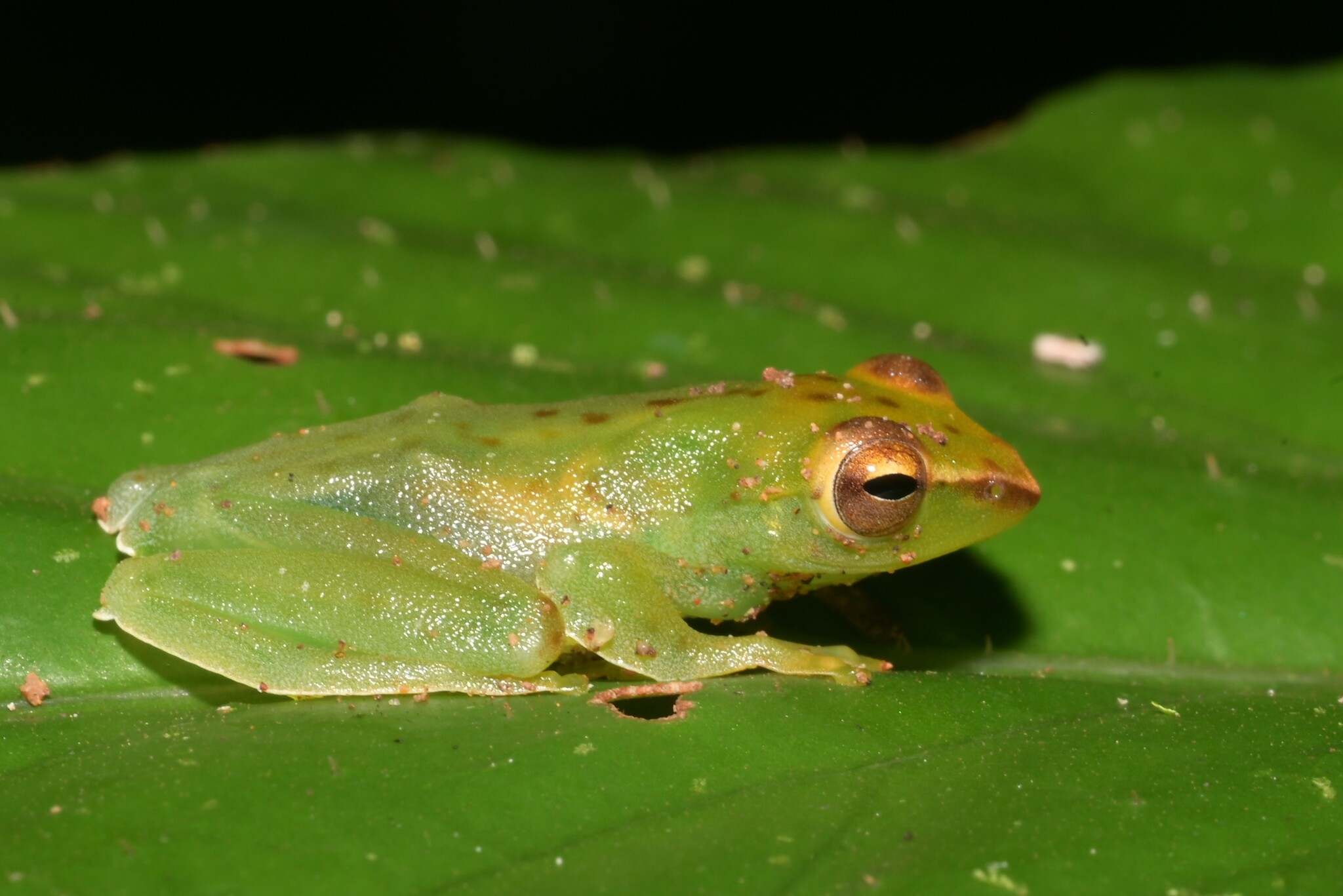

Conservation status
- Least Concern (IUCN 3.1)

Scientific classification
- Kingdom: Animalia
- Phylum: Chordata
- Class: Amphibia
- Order: Anura
- Family: Rhacophoridae
- Genus: Zhangixalus
- Species: Z. dulitensis

Binomial name
- Zhangixalus dulitensis (Boulenger, 1892)

Synonyms
- Rhacophorus dulitensis Boulenger, 1892; Rhacophorus chiropterus Werner, 1986

= Jade tree frog =

Species of amphibian

The jade tree frog or Dulit flying frog (Zhangixalus dulitensis) is a species of frog in the family Rhacophoridae found in northern Borneo. Its natural habitats are subtropical or tropical moist lowland forests and intermittent freshwater marshes. It is becoming rare due to habitat loss.

This frog is very common but rarely spotted by humans because it lives high in the canopy. The frogs descend to the ground when it is time to breed. This frog has been observed no higher than 300 meters above sea level.

The IUCN classifies this frog as at least concern of extinction because of its large population. Humans pose some threat through deforestation associated with palm oil agriculture.

== Etymology ==
The name of the genus honors Zhang Ya-Ping from the Chinese Academy of Sciences, in recognition to his contributions to biodiversity and evolution research in China, in combination with ixalus, a common generic root for tree frogs.
