= Rhacophorus nigropunctatus =

Conservation status
- Least Concern (IUCN 3.1)

Scientific classification
- Kingdom: Animalia
- Phylum: Chordata
- Class: Amphibia
- Order: Anura
- Family: Rhacophoridae
- Genus: Rhacophorus
- Species: R. nigropunctatus

Binomial name
- Rhacophorus nigropunctatus Liu, Hu & Yang, 1962

Synonyms
- Polypedates nigropunctatus (Liu, Hu & Yang, 1962)

Species of frog

Rhacophorus nigropunctatus is a species of frog in the family Rhacophoridae. It is found in China, possibly Myanmar, and possibly Vietnam. It has been observed between 2000 and 3150 meters above sea level.

Its natural habitats are temperate forests, subtropical or tropical moist lowland forests, subtropical or tropical moist montane forests, subtropical or tropical moist shrubland, rivers, freshwater marshes, intermittent freshwater marshes, ponds, and irrigated land.

This frog breeds in pools and ponds. The adult frogs hide in caves during the day and look for food at night. They also hibernate in mud caves.

The IUCN classifies this frog as at least concern of extinction because of its large range. This range includes some protected parks, such as Badagong Mountain National Nature Reserve. Extant threats to this frog include habitat degradation associated with agriculture and infrastructure.
