= Hongchiba National Forest Park =

National park in Chongqing, China

Coordinates: 31.5121°N 109.0999°E

Hongchiba National Forest Park is one of the 26 national parks in Chongqing, China.

It is located in the northwest of Wuxi, with a total area of about 253.8 km^{2} (98.0 sq mi), and consists of six distinctive functional districts. Almost all these districts are virgin areas but part of the rest is under construction due to tourism service concerns. According to the etymology, the name of this park used today could be dated back to the Warring States Period, when it was named "Wanqinchi" and where Huangxie, a famous person in ancient Chinese history, had lived.

Geologically, it is a typical karst topography, characterized by underground drainage systems with sinkholes and caves. Though subterranean drainage may limit surface water with few to no rivers or lakes, this huge park contributes water sources to four main trunk streams, Ren River, Tangxi River, Xixi River and Houxi River within the county, flowing into the Yangtze River finally. One part of these subterranean rivers that breaks through the surface, called Xiliuxi (flow towards the west), later becomes the head-stream of Tangxi River. The rain here is abundant because the park lies in the middle ventral of the Ta-pa Mountains, which goes from the west to the east, differs the yellow river basin from the Yangtze river basin, and intercepts the precipitation by monsoon. The normal altitude changes from 1,600 m (5,200 ft) to 2,630 m (8,630 ft), resulting a relatively cool daytime summer, about 8 °C (46 °F) lower than the downtown temperature. The coldest winter, with snow cover from 50 cm (20 in) to 80 cm (31 in) deep, will last for about three months, from late November to early February.
