= List of amphibians of Nepal =

The amphibians of Nepal represent a variety of species, including:

== Anura (frogs and toads) ==
=== True frogs ===
Order: Anura Family: Ranidae

- Assam sucker frog (Amolops formosus)
- Yembung sucker frog (Amolops gerbillus)
- Himalaya sucker frog (Amolops himalanus)
- Marbled sucker frog (Amolops marmoratus)
- Mountain sucker frog (Amolops monticola)
- Humerana humeralis
- Black striped frog (Sylvirana nigrovittata)

=== True toads ===
Order: Anura Family: Bufonidae

- Asian common toad (Duttaphrynus melanostictus)
- Marbled toad (Duttaphrynus stomaticus)

=== Fork-tongued frogs ===
Order: Anura Family: Dicroglossidae

- Indian skitter frog (Euphlyctis cyanphlyctis)
- Jerdon's bullfrog (Hoplobatrachus crassus)
- Asian bullfrog (Hoplobatrachus tigerinus)
- Northern frog (Ingerana borealis)
- Annandale's paa frog (Nanorana annandalii)
- Arnold's paa frog (Nanorana arnoldi)
- Blandford's paa frog (Nanorana blanfordii)
- Torrent paa frog (Nanorana ercepeae)
- Sikkim paa frog (Nanorana liebigii)
- Nepal paa frog (Nanorana minica)
- Mountain slow frog (Nanorana parkeri)
- Langtana paa frog (Nanorana polunini)
- Rara paa frog (Narorana rarica)
- Dubois' paa frog (Nanorana rostandi)
- Ombrana sikimensis
- Indian burrowing frog (Sphaerotheca breviceps)
- Sphaerotheca maskeyi
- Sphaerotheca swani
- Nepal cricket frog (Zakerana nepalensis)
- Pierre's cricket frog (Zakerana pierrei)
- Long legged cricket frog (Zakarena syhadrensis)
- Terai cricket frog (Zakerana teraiensis)

=== Narrow-mouthed frogs ===
Order: Anura Family: Microhylidae

- Ornamented pygmy frog (Microhyla ornata)
- Indian painted bullfrog (Uperodon taprobanicus)

=== Shrub frogs ===
Order: Anura Family: Rhacophoridae

- Common tree frog (Polypedates leucomystax)
- Annandale's bush frog (Raorchestes annandalii)
- Nepal flying frog (Zhangixalus smaragdinus)

=== Goose frogs ===
Order: Anura Family: Megophryidae

- Small spadefoot toad (Megophrys parva)
- Bengal spadefoot toad (Megophrys robusta)
- Himalayan stream frog (Scutiger boulengeri)
- Nepal lazy toad (Scutiger nepalensis)
- Scutiger nyingchiensis
- Sikkim lazy toad (Scutiger sikimmensis)

== Gymnophiona (caecilians and relatives) ==
Family: Ichthyophiidae

- Darjeeling caecilians (Ichthyophis sikkimensis)

== Urodela (salamanders and relatives) ==
Family: Salamandridae

- Himalayan newt (Tylototriton verrucosus)
