= Spiny frog (disambiguation) =

The spiny frog is a frog native to Hainan, southern China.

Spiny frog may also refer to:

- Blanford's spiny frog, a frog found in China, India, Nepal, and possibly Bhutan
- Boulenger's spiny frog, a frog found in China and Vietnam
- Cona spiny frog, a frog found in China and Bhutan
- Giant spiny frog, a frog found in China
- Hong Kong spiny frog, a frog found in southern China
- Jiulong spiny frog, a frog endemic to eastern China
- Medog spiny frog, a frog endemic to Tibet, China
- Ocellated spiny frog, a frog found in China and Myanmar
- Piebald spiny frog, a frog endemic to Yunnan, China
- Polunin's spiny frog, a frog found in China, India, and Nepal
- Spiny Cochran frog, a frog found in Colombia, Costa Rica, Ecuador, Honduras, Panama, and Nicaragua
- Spiny giant frog, a frog found in the Dominican Republic and Haiti
- Spiny reed frog, a frog found in Africa
- Spiny tree frog, a frog endemic to the Philippines
- Spiny tree frog (Papua New Guinea), a frog endemic to Papua New Guinea
- Yunnan spiny frog, found in China, Vietnam, Myanmar, and possibly Laos
