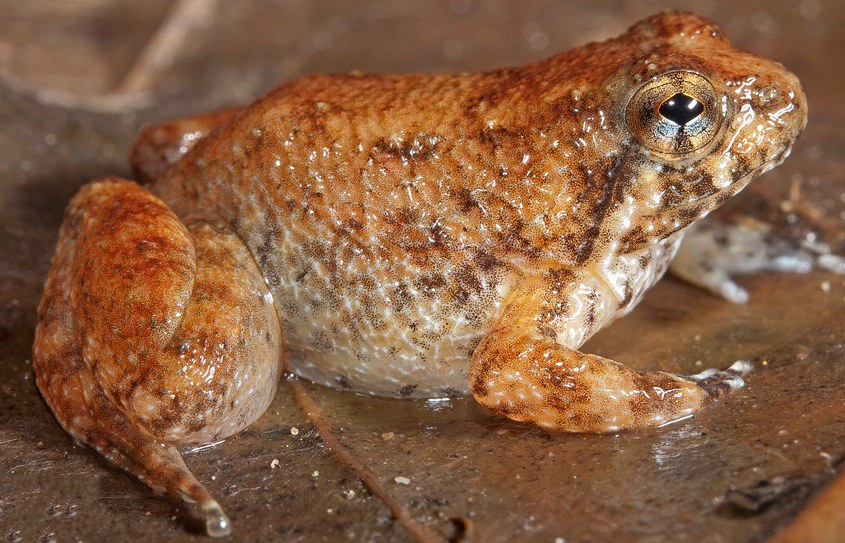
- Ingerana borealis

Scientific classification
- Kingdom: Animalia
- Phylum: Chordata
- Class: Amphibia
- Order: Anura
- Family: Dicroglossidae
- Subfamily: Occidozyginae
- Genus: Ingerana; Dubois, 1987

Type species
- Rana tenasserimensis Sclater, 1892

Species
- See text.

= Ingerana =

Genus of amphibians

Ingerana, sometimes known as eastern frogs, is a genus of frogs that belongs to the family Dicroglossidae. Species of the genus are distributed in southeastern Asia, from Nepal, northeastern India, and southwestern China to Indochina, Borneo, and the Philippines.

== Etymology ==
The genus Ingerana is named in honor of American herpetologist Robert F. Inger.

== Species ==
With the placement of Ingerana baluensis being enigmatic, several species having been transferred to Limnonectes in 2013 (Ingerana alpina, Ingerana liui, Ingerana medogensis, Ingerana xizangensis), and one species being transferred to Minervarya in 2022 (Ingerana charlesdarwini), this genus is left the following species:

- Ingerana borealis (Annandale, 1912)
- Ingerana occidens Naveen, 2026
- Ingerana reticulata (Zhao & S.-Q. Li, 1984)
- Ingerana tenasserimensis (Sclater, 1892)
