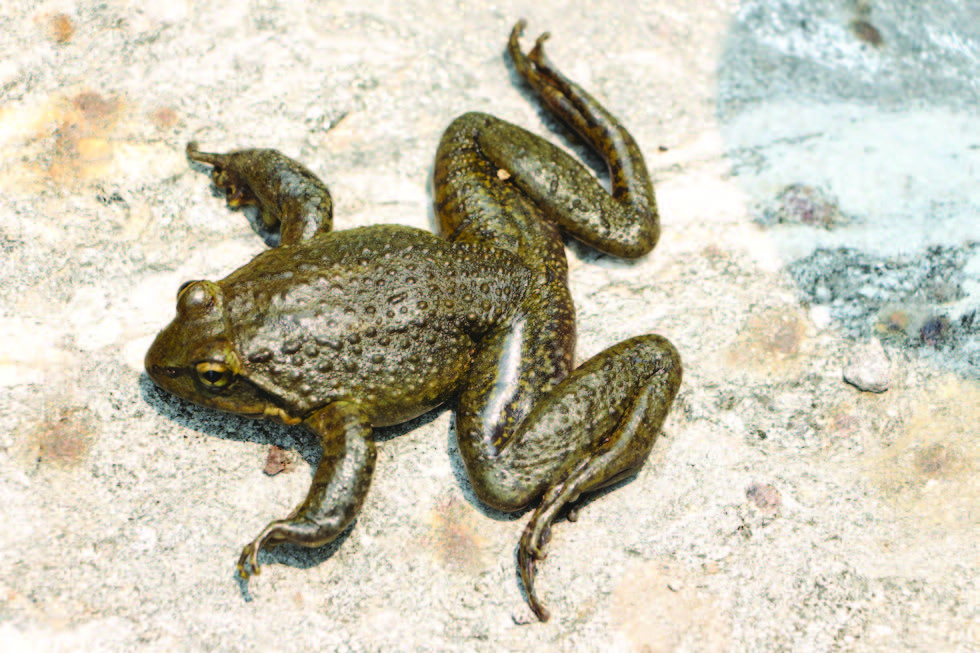
- Nanorana liebigii from Nepal.
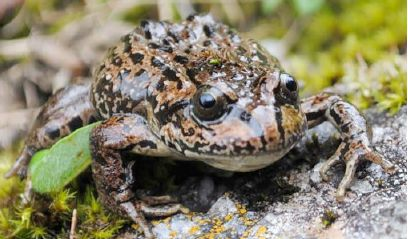
- The type species, Nanorana pleskei, from Bhutan.

Scientific classification
- Kingdom: Animalia
- Phylum: Chordata
- Class: Amphibia
- Order: Anura
- Family: Dicroglossidae
- Subfamily: Dicroglossinae
- Genus: Nanorana; Günther, 1896

Type species
- Nanorana pleskei Günther, 1896

Synonyms
- Altirana Stejneger, 1927; Chaparana Bourret, 1939; Paa Dubois, 1975; Feirana Dubois, 1992

= Nanorana =

Genus of dicroglossid frogs

Nanorana is a genus of dicroglossid frogs that are found in the Himalayan region of Asia.

Common names of these frogs reflect the complex taxonomic history of the genus (see below) and include Yunnan slow frogs (or simply slow frogs) and High Himalaya frogs (for the now-synonymized genus Altirana).

== Distribution ==
This genus has a wide distribution across Asia in the Himalayan region, central China and northern Indochina. Their range includes northern Pakistan, northern India, Nepal, western China east to montane southern China and southeast to Myanmar, Thailand, Laos, and northern Vietnam.

== Taxonomy ==
The taxonomy of true frogs and their allies has been subject to numerous changes during the last decade and is not yet fully settled. Nanorana in particular has seen big changes. As currently delineated, Nanorana is a quite large genus with 28 species, resulting from considering Chaparana, Paa, and Feirana as junior synonyms.

Currently these taxa may be recognized as subgenera, but their delineation is not entirely settled and not all species have been assigned to subgenera. Species at one point placed in these subgenera might currently be placed also in genera other than Nanorana such as Quasipaa, Ombrana or Allopaa.

== Species ==
The following species are recognised in the genus Nanorana:

- Nanorana aenea (Smith, 1922)
- Nanorana annandalii (Boulenger, 1920)
- Nanorana arnoldi (Dubois, 1975)
- Nanorana arunachalensis (Saikia, Sinha, and Kharkongor, 2017)
- Nanorana blanfordii (Boulenger, 1882)
- Nanorana chayuensis (Ye, 1977)
- Nanorana conaensis (Fei and Huang, 1981)
- Nanorana ercepeae (Dubois, 1974)
- Nanorana feae (Boulenger, 1887)
- Nanorana gammii (Anderson, 1871)
- Nanorana kangxianensis (Yang, Wang, Hu, and Jiang, 2011)
- Nanorana laojunshanensis
- Nanorana liebigii (Günther, 1860)
- Nanorana maculosa (Liu, Hu, and Yang, 1960)
- Nanorana medogensis (Fei and Ye, 1999)
- Nanorana minica (Dubois, 1975)
- Nanorana mokokchungensis (Das and Chanda, 2000)
- Nanorana parkeri (Stejneger, 1927)
- Nanorana phrynoides (Boulenger, 1917)
- Nanorana pleskei Günther, 1896
- Nanorana polunini (Smith, 1951)
- Nanorana quadranus (Liu, Hu, and Yang, 1960)
- Nanorana rarica (Dubois, Matsui, and Ohler, 2001)
- Nanorana rostandi (Dubois, 1974)
- Nanorana sichuanensis (Dubois, 1987)
- Nanorana taihangnica (Chen and Jiang, 2002)
- Nanorana unculuanus (Liu, Hu, and Yang, 1960)
- Nanorana ventripunctata Fei and Huang, 1985
- Nanorana wenshanensis
- Nanorana vicina (Stoliczka, 1872)
- Nanorana yunnanensis (Anderson, 1879)
- Nanorana zhaoermii Qi, Zhou, Lu et Li, 2019
- Nanorana zhaotongensis
