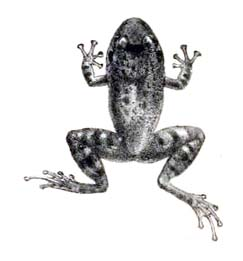

Conservation status
- Least Concern (IUCN 3.1)

Scientific classification
- Kingdom: Animalia
- Phylum: Chordata
- Class: Amphibia
- Order: Anura
- Family: Dicroglossidae
- Genus: Ingerana
- Species: I. tenasserimensis

Binomial name
- Ingerana tenasserimensis (Sclater, 1892)

Synonyms
- Rana tenasserimensis Sclater, 1892

= Ingerana tenasserimensis =

Species of amphibian

Ingerana tenasserimensis (common names: Tenasserim eastern frog, pale-headed frog) is a species of frog in the family Dicroglossidae. It is found in Myanmar, western and peninsular Thailand, and adjacent to Peninsular Malaysia.

Ingerana tenasserimensis inhabit the forest floor near streams in closed-canopy rainforests. They are also found in older rubber plantations.
