= Sphaerotheca varshaabhu =

Varshaa burrowing frog

Scientific classification
- Kingdom: Animalia
- Phylum: Chordata
- Class: Amphibia
- Order: Anura
- Family: Dicroglossidae
- Genus: Sphaerotheca
- Species: S. varshaabhu

Binomial name
- Sphaerotheca varshaabhu Deepak et al., 2024

Species of frog

Sphaerotheca varshaabhu, commonly known as the Varshaa burrowing frog, is a species of Ranidae family frog which is found in India. The species name is derived from the Sanskrit word 'Varshaabhu'. Varshaa means rain and bhu means taking birth. It signifies its breeding activity only during the rainy season.

== Discovery ==
Sphaerotheca varshaabhu was formally described as a new species in 2024. The species was described from the suburban region of Bengaluru, Karnataka, India, as part of a study using morphological, molecular and bioacoustic evidence. The type series consisted of one holotype and two paratypes collected from disturbed suburban agroecosystems at Budumanhalli, at an elevation of 850 m (2,790 ft). The type specimens were deposited at the Western Regional Centre of the Zoological Survey of India (WRC-ZSI). The authors used an integrative taxonomic approach combining molecular phylogeny, genetic distances, morphological characters and geographical isolation. The species forms a genetically divergent lineage within Sphaerotheca. Analysis of the mitochondrial 16S rRNA gene found genetic distances of 3.6–12.2% between S. varshaabhu and other species of the genus. The phylogenetic analysis recovered S. varshaabhu as one of 10 valid species of Sphaerotheca following the taxonomic revision of the genus.
