= High-altitude frog (disambiguation) =

The high-altitude frog is a frog found in northeastern India, Bangladesh, Myanmar, northern Peninsular Thailand, and possibly Bhutan and Nepal.

High-altitude frog may also refer to:

- Annandale's high-altitude frog, a frog found in India, Tibet, and Myanmar
- Pleske's high-altitude frog, a frog found in China and Bhutan
