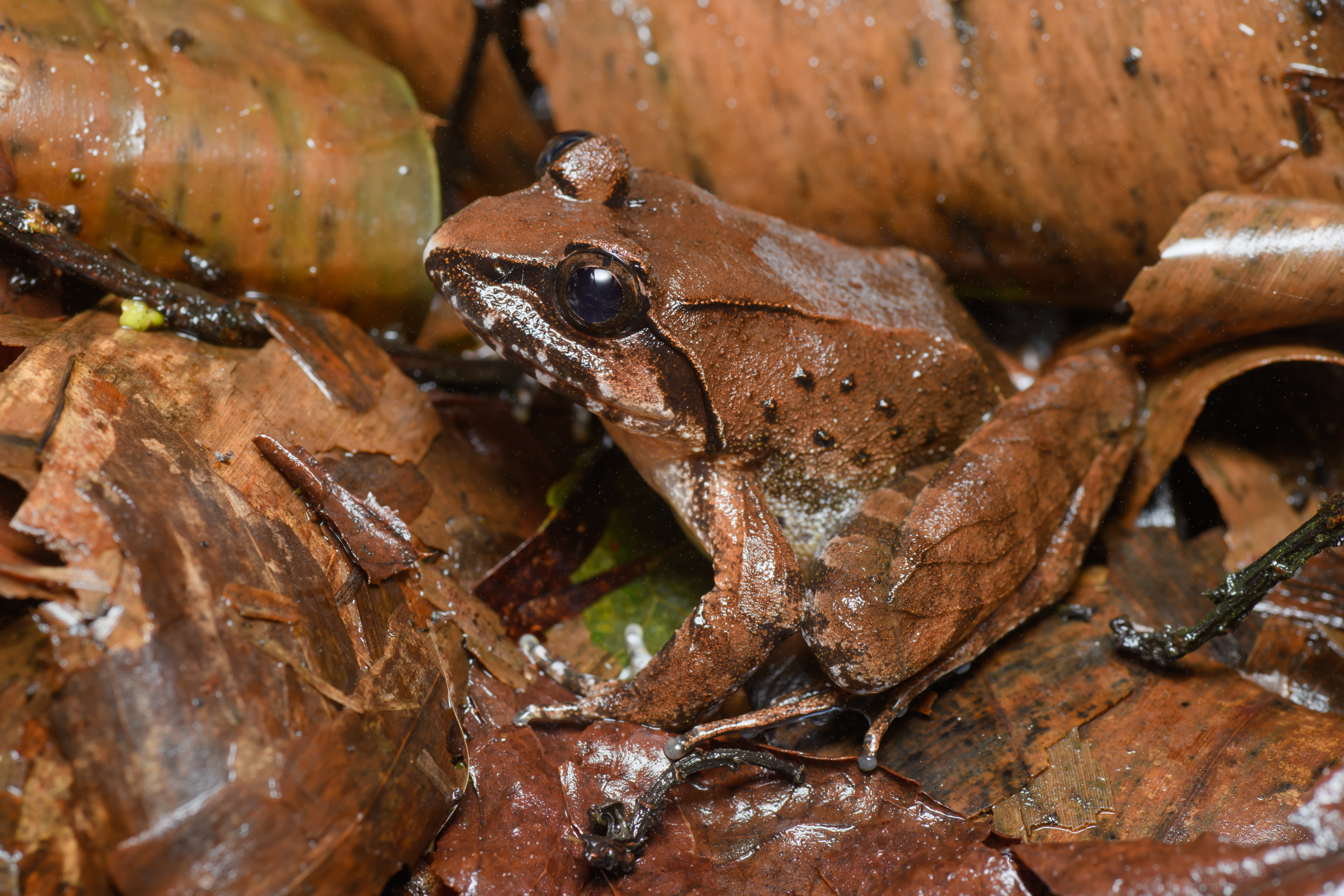

Conservation status
- Least Concern (IUCN 3.1)

Scientific classification
- Kingdom: Animalia
- Phylum: Chordata
- Class: Amphibia
- Order: Anura
- Family: Dicroglossidae
- Genus: Nanorana
- Species: N. aenea

Binomial name
- Nanorana aenea (Smith, 1922)

Synonyms
- Rana aenea Smith, 1922; Chaparana aenea (Smith, 1922); Rana fansipani Bourret, 1939; Chaparana fansipani (Bourret, 1939); Nanorana fansipani (Bourret, 1939)

= Doichang frog =

Species of amphibian

The Doichang frog (Nanorana aenea) is a species of frog in the family Dicroglossidae. It is only known from its type locality, Doi Chang, mountain north of Chiang Mai (Thailand), Fansipan mountain in northern Vietnam (type locality for the now-synonymized Rana fansipani), and Huanglianshan National Nature Reserve in Yunnan, China.

== Description ==
Adult males of Doichang frog are 65–77 mm (2.6–3.0 in) in snout-vent length and have spines in several parts of their bodies, a male secondary sex characteristic.

== Habitat and conservation ==
Its natural habitats are subtropical or tropical moist montane forest and rivers. It is potentially threatened by habitat loss, more so in Vietnam than in Thailand. In Vietnam it is probably eaten locally.
