= Lajo Dada =

Mountain peak

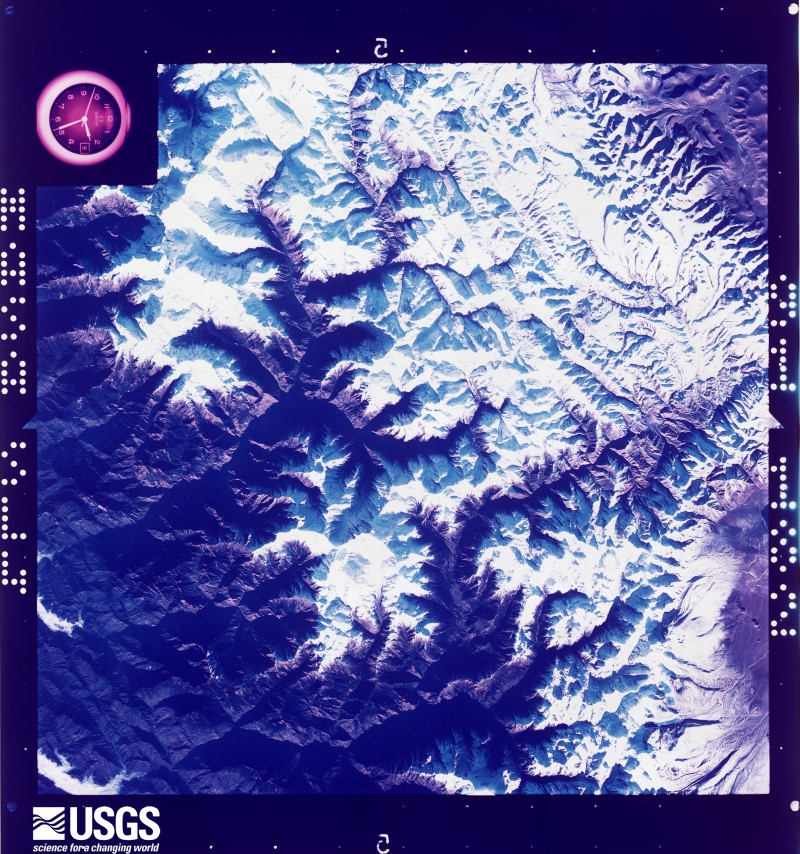
- Lajo Dada, Nepal. Image taken by NASA's Skylab on December 9, 1973

Highest point
- Elevation: 6,426 m
- Coordinates: 28°32′45.33″N 85°3′12.18″E

Geography
- Location within Nepal Location within Tibet Location within China Location within Asia
- Country: Nepal
- Parent range: Himalayas

Climbing
- First ascent: October 17, 2017; by three-member Japanese team

Lajo Dada (also known as Langu Himal) is a mountain peak in Dhaulagiri Zone, Gandaki Province of western central Nepal.

== Location ==
It is located 6,426 m (21,083 ft) above sea level in the west of the Tsum Valley and south of the Tabsar at 6,065 m (19,898 ft). This peak was not accessible to the public until 2014, when it was opened for climbing by the Nepalese government.

== Climbing history ==
On October 17, 2017, a three-member Japanese team made the first ascent of Lajo Dada. All three were members of Tomon Alpine Club and graduates of Waseda University: Norifumi Fukuda, Kojuro Hagihara, and Yudai Suzuki.
