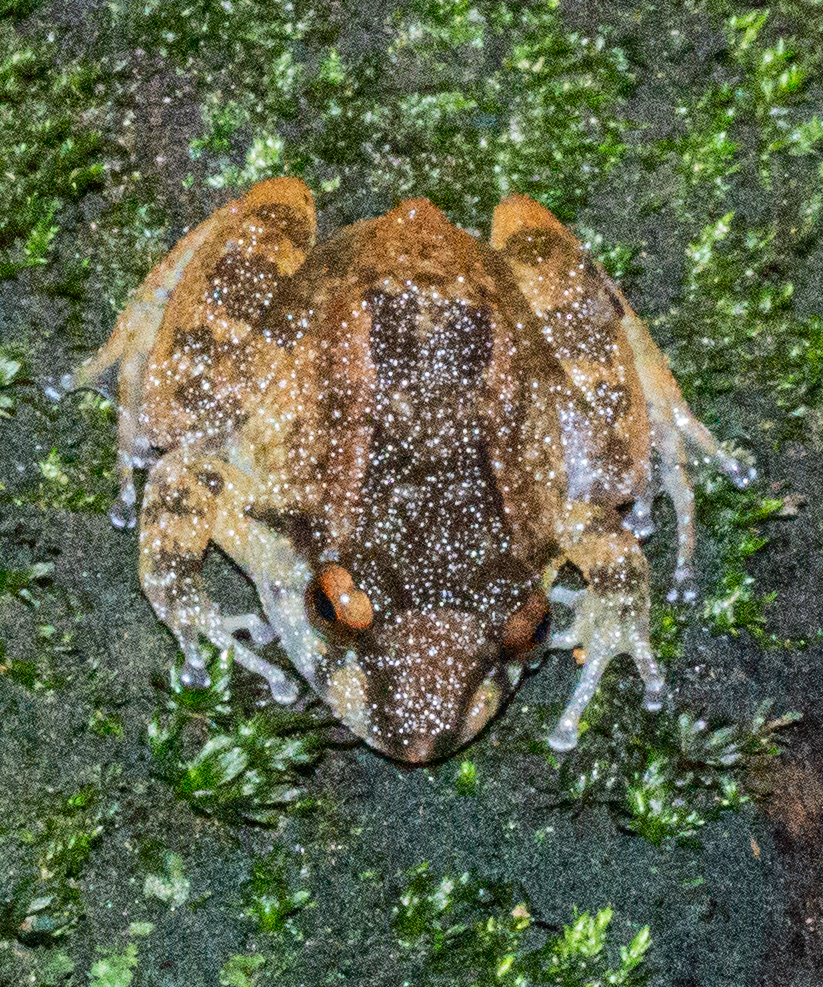

Conservation status
- Endangered (IUCN 3.1)

Scientific classification
- Kingdom: Animalia
- Phylum: Chordata
- Class: Amphibia
- Order: Anura
- Family: Ceratobatrachidae
- Genus: Alcalus
- Species: A. sariba

Binomial name
- Alcalus sariba (Shelford, 1905)

Synonyms
- Rana sariba Shelford, 1905; Ingerana (Ingerana) sariba (Shelford, 1905); Taylorana sariba (Shelford, 1905)

= Alcalus sariba =

Species of frog

Alcalus sariba, also known as Saribau eastern frog or Saribau dwarf mountain frog, is a species of frog in the subfamily Alcalinae, family Ceratobatrachidae. It is endemic to Sarawak, Malaysian Borneo, where it is known from a small number of locations, including the eponymous Mount Saribau. It has often been included in Alcalus baluensis (=Ingerana baluensis), but is now considered a distinct species. The two species are similar but Alcalus sariba is larger.

== Description ==
The holotype is a female measuring 38 mm (1.5 in) in snout–vent length, and the common length for females is 36–38 mm (1.4–1.5 in); the size of the male is unknown. The overall appearance is stocky. The head is relatively big compared to the body. Coloration varies from light to dark brown and includes some darker markings. The adhesive finger discs bear a white cross-bar.

== Habitat and conservation ==
Alcalus sariba occurs along seepage areas close to small streams as well as in leaf litter in primary forest; it does not tolerate habitat disturbance. Breeding biology is unknown but presumably involves direct development (i.e, there is no free-living larval stage), as in other Alcalus.

Alcalus sariba is considered common and occurs in the Santubong National Park, Kubah National Park, and Matang Wildlife Centre. However, outside protected areas it is threatened by habitat loss caused by logging concessions, small scale subsistence logging, and oil palm plantations. Furthermore, Santubong National Park is facing encroachment from housing and tourism development.
