= Dubois' frog =

Dubois' frog may refer to:

- Dubois' hill frog (Zakerana keralensis), a frog in the family Dicroglossidae from India
- Dubois' paa frog (Nanorana rostandi), a frog in the family Dicroglossidae endemic to western Nepal
