= Nanorana unculuanus =

Conservation status
- Vulnerable (IUCN 3.1)

Scientific classification
- Kingdom: Animalia
- Phylum: Chordata
- Class: Amphibia
- Order: Anura
- Family: Dicroglossidae
- Genus: Nanorana
- Species: N. unculuanus

Binomial name
- Nanorana unculuanus (Liu, Hu, and Yang, 1960)

Synonyms
- Rana unculuanus Liu, Hu, and Yang, 1960; Chaparana unculuanus (Liu, Hu, and Yang, 1960); Paa unculuanus (Liu, Hu, and Yang, 1960)

Species of amphibian

Nanorana unculuanus (common names: Yunnan Asian frog) is a species of frog in the family Dicroglossidae. It is endemic to central and southern Yunnan, China, although it is expected to have wider distribution than currently known, possibly extending into Vietnam. Its natural habitats are fast-flowing hill streams and riparian habitats in forests and grasslands, but also man-made habitats like roadside drainage ditches and ponds. It is a rare and secretive species that appears to be declining. It is currently threatened by collection for food and also by habitat loss.

Nanorana unculuanus are medium-sized frogs: males grow to a snout–vent length of about 76 mm (3.0 in) and females to 79 mm (3.1 in). Tadpoles are up to 35 mm (1.4 in) in length.
