= Sphaerotheca =

Sphaerotheca may refer to:

- Sphaerotheca (frog), a genus of frogs in the family Dicroglossidae
- Sphaerotheca (fungus), a former genus of fungi in the family Erysiphaceae, now synonymous with Podosphaera
