= Tsum Valley =

Tsum Valley त्सुम upatyaka
- Valley
- Interactive map of Tsum Valley
- Coordinates: 28.5°N 85.1°E
- Country: Nepal
- Province: Gandaki Province
- District: Gorkha District
- Highest elevation: 4,000 m (13,000 ft)
- Lowest elevation: 1,900 m (6,200 ft)
- Demonym: Tsumba

Tsum Valley is a remote Himalayan valley located in the northern part of Gorkha District, in Gandaki Province, Nepal. Nestled within the Manaslu Conservation Area, the valley lies close to the Tibetan border and is known for its unique cultural heritage, sacred Buddhist monasteries, and pristine landscapes. Tsum Valley has been described as a "hidden valley," or Beyul, a concept in Tibetan Buddhism referring to a place of spiritual refuge.

== Geography ==
The valley is situated at an altitude ranging from about 1,900 metres (6,200 ft) to over 4,000 metres (13,000 ft) above sea level. It is bounded by the Ganesh Himal, Sringi Himal, and Boudha Himal mountain ranges. The Budhi Gandaki River provides the main access corridor leading towards the valley. Because of its geographical isolation, Tsum Valley remained largely closed to outsiders until the early 21st century.

== History and culture ==
Tsum Valley has deep cultural and religious ties with Tibet. Historically, the valley was part of the trade routes connecting Nepal and Tibet, and its people maintain strong linguistic and cultural links to Tibetan communities. The local inhabitants are known as Tsumba, who speak a unique dialect of Tibetan origin.

The valley is rich in Buddhist heritage. Ancient monasteries such as Mu Gompa and Rachen Gompa are important centers of spiritual learning and meditation. Milarepa, a revered Tibetan Buddhist saint, is believed to have meditated in caves within the valley, which has made Tsum a site of pilgrimage for centuries.

== Demographics ==
The population of Tsum Valley is relatively small, spread across several villages including Chumling, Chhokangparo, Nile, and Dharapani. Subsistence farming and animal husbandry are the main sources of livelihood. Despite the introduction of modern amenities in recent years, many traditional practices, including polyandry and communal resource sharing, still persist in parts of the valley.

== Economy ==
Agriculture is the backbone of the local economy, with residents cultivating crops such as barley, potatoes, maize, and buckwheat. Yak and sheep herding are also significant, especially in higher-altitude settlements. Limited trade with Tibet continues in some areas, although tourism has become an increasingly important economic activity since the valley was opened to trekkers in 2008.

== Tourism ==
Tsum Valley is part of the Manaslu Circuit Trek and has gained popularity among trekkers seeking less-commercialized routes. The Tsum Valley valley offers panoramic views of Himalayan peaks, diverse flora and fauna, and cultural encounters with the Tsumba people. Strict regulations, including special permits, are required for entry, as the area is designated a restricted region by the Government of Nepal.

== Conservation ==
Tsum Valley lies within the Manaslu Conservation Area, which supports wildlife including snow leopards, blue sheep, and Himalayan tahr. Conservation initiatives focus on balancing ecological preservation with sustainable tourism and the protection of local cultural heritage.

== See also ==
- Manaslu Conservation Area
- Beyul
- Gorkha District
