= Ingerana reticulata =

Conservation status
- Data Deficient (IUCN 3.1)

Scientific classification
- Kingdom: Animalia
- Phylum: Chordata
- Class: Amphibia
- Order: Anura
- Family: Dicroglossidae
- Genus: Ingerana
- Species: I. reticulata

Binomial name
- Ingerana reticulata (Zhao and Li, 1984)

Synonyms
- Platymantis reticulatus Zhao and Li, 1984; Micrixalus reticulatus (Zhao and Li, 1984); Liurana reticulata (Zhao and Li, 1984)

Species of frog

Ingerana reticulata is a species of frog in the family Dicroglossidae. As presently known, it is endemic to Mêdog County in southeastern Tibet, China, but its range might extend to northeast India, given the proximity of the border. Common names reticulate eastern frog, reticulate wrinkled ground frog, and reticulated papillae-tongued frog have been coined for it.

== Description ==
Males grow to a snout–vent length of 18 mm (0.71 in) and females to 21 mm (0.83 in). The tympanum is hidden under skin. Dorsal skin has reticulate skin ridges. The belly has transverse skin folds and is cream yellow in color, with sparse dark dots. The toes are partly webbed.

== Habitat and conservation ==
Ingerana reticulata has been found among rocks next to small rivers and brooks within tropical moist forest. Its altitudinal range is probably about 800–940 m (2,620–3,080 ft) above sea level. Development might be direct (i.e, there is no free-living larval stage), as in its relatives.

Ingerana reticulata is a rare and poorly known species. There are no known threats to it. It is present in the Yarlung Tsangpo Nature Reserve.
