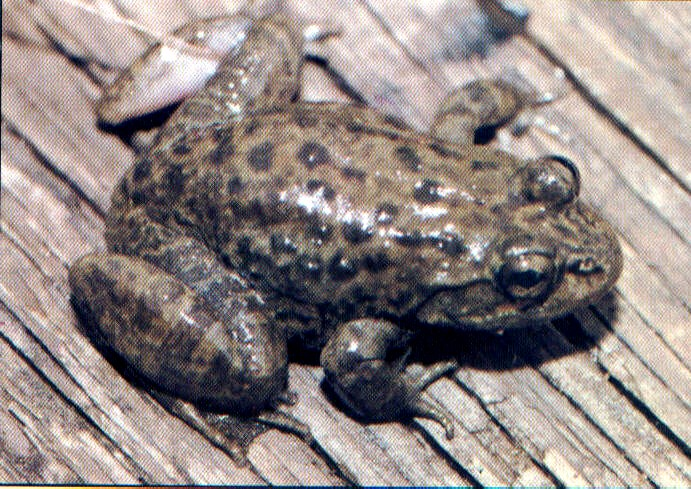

Conservation status
- Least Concern (IUCN 3.1)

Scientific classification
- Kingdom: Animalia
- Phylum: Chordata
- Class: Amphibia
- Order: Anura
- Family: Dicroglossidae
- Genus: Allopaa
- Species: A. hazarensis

Binomial name
- Allopaa hazarensis (Dubois and Khan, 1979)

Synonyms
- Rana hazarensis Dubois and Khan, 1979; Paa hazarensis (Dubois and Khan, 1979); Nanorana hazarensis (Dubois and Khan, 1979)

= Allopaa hazarensis =

Species of amphibian

Allopaa hazarensis (common names: Kashmir paa frog, Hazara frog, Hazara torrent frog ) is a species of frogs in the family Dicroglossidae. It is found in Hazara, Pakistan (where the type locality is, hence the name) and in Kashmir in India and Pakistan. Its natural habitats are fast-flowing streams where it can occur both in torrential sections and in pools. Tadpoles use their oral disc as a sucker to hold on stones. Prolonged drought periods are a potential threat to this species.

Whether Allopaa barmoachensis is a distinct species or a synonym of Allopaa hazarensis remains uncertain.
