= Sphaerotheca rolandae =

Conservation status
- Least Concern (IUCN 3.1)

Scientific classification
- Kingdom: Animalia
- Phylum: Chordata
- Class: Amphibia
- Order: Anura
- Family: Dicroglossidae
- Genus: Sphaerotheca
- Species: S. rolandae

Binomial name
- Sphaerotheca rolandae (Dubois, 1983)

Synonyms
- Rana breviceps ssp. rolandae Dubois, 1983; Tomopterna rolandae (Dubois, 1983)

Species of frog

Sphaerotheca rolandae (common names: Sri Lanka bullfrog, Roland's burrowing frog, southern burrowing frog, marble sand frog) is a species of frog in the family Dicroglossidae found in Sri Lanka. It is controversial whether the species also occurs in India and Nepal. Its natural habitats are subtropical or tropical dry forest, subtropical or tropical dry shrubland, intermittent freshwater marshes, arable land, and pastureland. It is threatened by habitat loss.
