= Rao's frog =

Rao's frog may refer to:

- Rao's torrent frog (Micrixalus kottigeharensis), a frog in the family Micrixalidae endemic to the Western Ghats of India
- Rao's white-banded frog (Sphaerotheca leucorhynchus), a frog in the family Dicroglossidae endemic to the Kodagu district, Karnataka, in southern India
