= Sphaerotheca leucorhynchus =

Conservation status
- Data Deficient (IUCN 3.1)

Scientific classification
- Kingdom: Animalia
- Phylum: Chordata
- Class: Amphibia
- Order: Anura
- Family: Dicroglossidae
- Genus: Sphaerotheca
- Species: S. leucorhynchus

Binomial name
- Sphaerotheca leucorhynchus (Rao, 1937)

Synonyms
- Rana leucorhynchus Rao, 1937; Tomopterna leucorhynchus (Rao, 1937)

Species of amphibian

Sphaerotheca leucorhynchus (common names: Wattakole bullfrog, Rao's burrowing frog, Rao's white-banded frog) is a species of frog in the family Dicroglossidae. It is endemic to India: it is only known from its type locality in Kodagu district, Karnataka, in southern India. The type specimen is lost, and this name might be a junior synonym of Sphaerotheca breviceps.
