= Nanorana quadranus =

Conservation status
- Near Threatened (IUCN 3.1)

Scientific classification
- Kingdom: Animalia
- Phylum: Chordata
- Class: Amphibia
- Order: Anura
- Family: Dicroglossidae
- Genus: Nanorana
- Species: N. quadranus

Binomial name
- Nanorana quadranus (Liu, Hu & Yang, 1960)

Synonyms
- Chaparana quadranus (Liu, Hu & Yang, 1960); Paa quadrana (Liu, Hu & Yang, 1960)

Species of frog

Nanorana quadranus (common names: Kwang-yang Asian frog, swelled vent frog) is a species of frog in the family Dicroglossidae. It is endemic to central China. Its natural habitats are temperate forest and shrubland, with breeding taking place in small rivers. It is a common species believed to be declining. It is threatened by collection for food and also habitat loss.

Nanorana quadranus are relatively large frogs: males grow to a snout–vent length of about 82 mm (3.2 in) and females to 90 mm (3.5 in). Tadpoles are up to 86 mm (3.4 in) in length.
