= Smith's frog =

Smith's frog may refer to:

- Smith's litter frog, a frog found in Southeast Asia
- Smith's wrinkled frog, a frog found in Thailand and possibly Myanmar
