= Nanorana ventripunctata =

Conservation status
- Least Concern (IUCN 3.1)

Scientific classification
- Kingdom: Animalia
- Phylum: Chordata
- Class: Amphibia
- Order: Anura
- Family: Dicroglossidae
- Genus: Nanorana
- Species: N. ventripunctata

Binomial name
- Nanorana ventripunctata Fei & Huang, 1985

Species of frog

Nanorana ventripunctata (common names: Yunnan slow frog, spot-bellied plateau frog) is a species of frog in the family Dicroglossidae. It is endemic to northwestern Yunnan, China. It inhabits lakes, pools and ponds in alpine areas, occurring near streams and rivers in open, high-elevation habitats. It breeds in still-water pools and ponds.

Nanorana ventripunctata are medium-sized frogs: males grow to a snout–vent length of about 44 mm (1.7 in) and females to 49 mm (1.9 in). Tadpoles are up to about 48 mm (1.9 in) in length.
