= Nanorana taihangnica =

Conservation status
- Least Concern (IUCN 3.1)

Scientific classification
- Kingdom: Animalia
- Phylum: Chordata
- Class: Amphibia
- Order: Anura
- Family: Dicroglossidae
- Genus: Nanorana
- Species: N. taihangnica

Binomial name
- Nanorana taihangnica (Chen & Jiang, 2002)

Synonyms
- Paa taihangnicus Chen & Jiang, 2002; Paa taihangnica Chen & Jiang, 2002; Chaparana taihangnicus (Chen & Jiang, 2002)

Species of frog

Nanorana taihangnica, or the Taihangshan swelled-vented frog, is a species of frog in the family Dicroglossidae. It is endemic to central China. Its type locality is on the Taihang Mountains, within the Jiyuan city in Henan province of central China. It is now also reported from Qin, Funiu and Zhongtiao Mountains (these can all be interpreted as being part of the greater Qin Mountains Region), with its distribution also including Gansu and Shaanxi provinces. There is substantial differentiation among lineages from different mountains.

Little is known about this relatively recently described species inhabiting rivers and surrounding forests.
