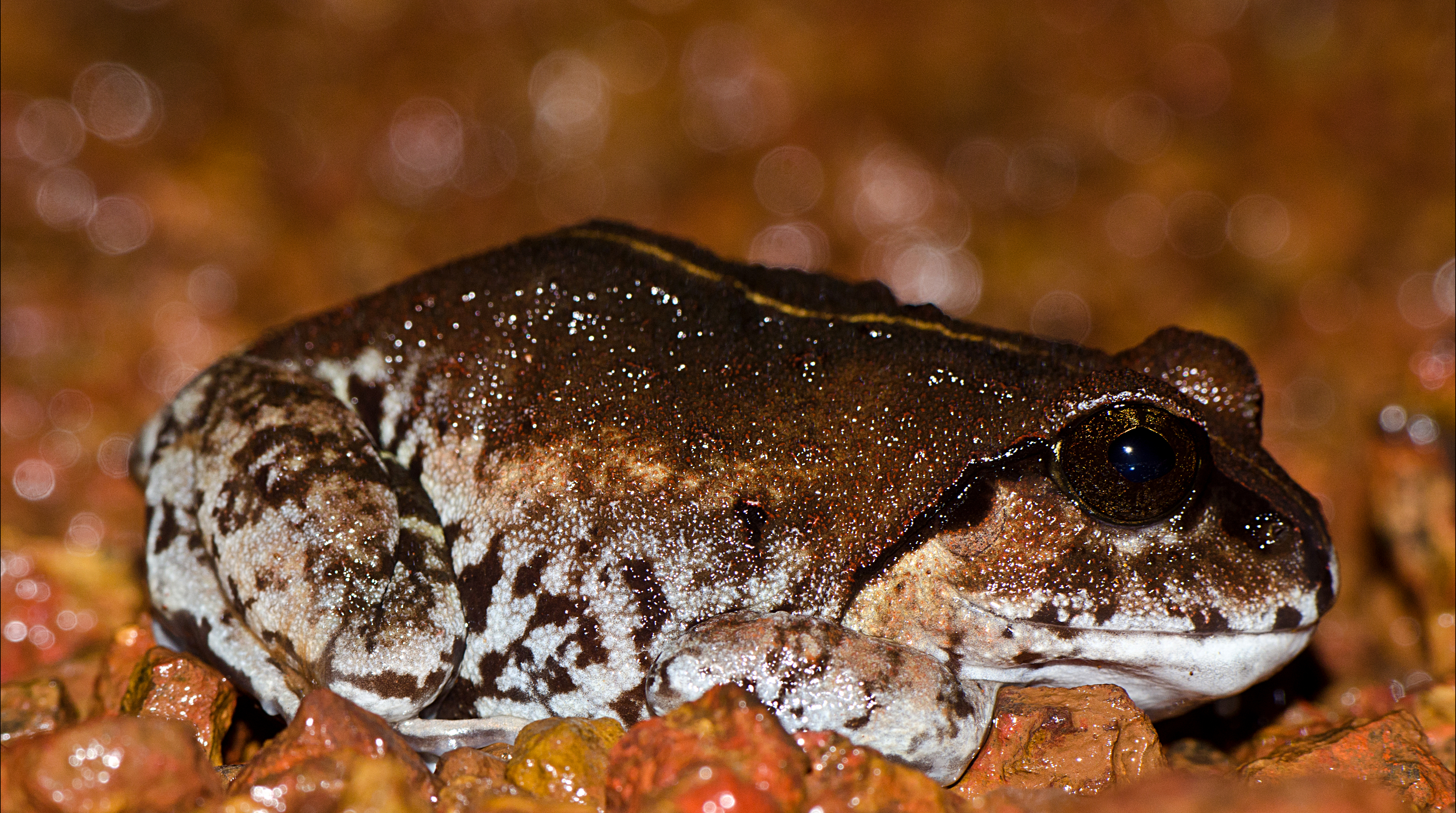

Conservation status
- Least Concern (IUCN 3.1)

Scientific classification
- Kingdom: Animalia
- Phylum: Chordata
- Class: Amphibia
- Order: Anura
- Family: Dicroglossidae
- Genus: Sphaerotheca
- Species: S. dobsonii

Binomial name
- Sphaerotheca dobsonii (Boulenger,1882)

Synonyms
- Rana dobsonii Boulenger, 1882; Tomopterna dobsonii (Boulenger, 1882)

= Sphaerotheca dobsonii =

Species of amphibian

Sphaerotheca dobsonii (common names: Mangalore bullfrog, Dobson's burrowing frog) is a species of frog capable of burrowing. It is found in southern India.

== Description ==
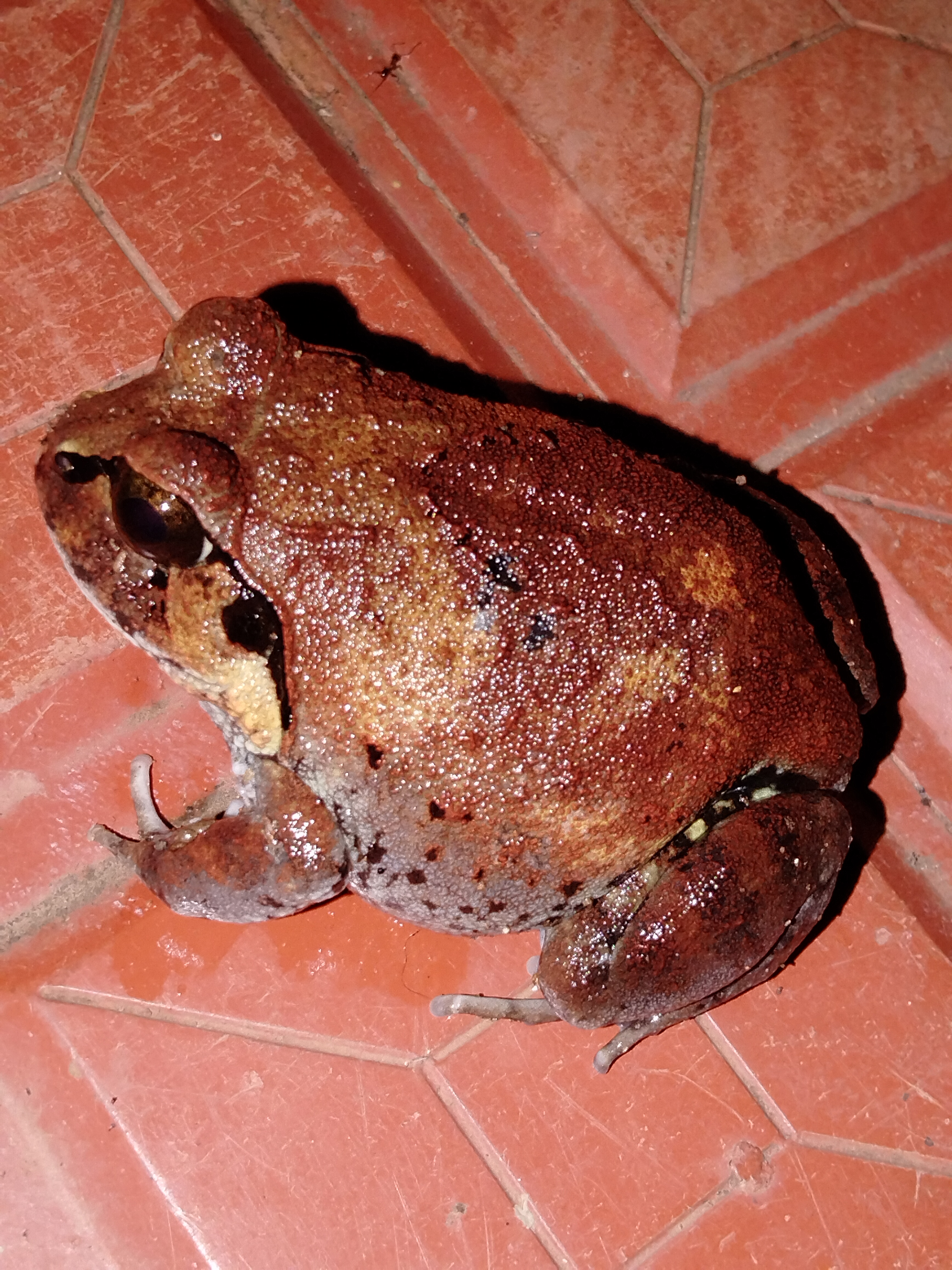
At Madikai, in Kerala

The vomerine teeth occur in two oblique series between the choanae. It is stout, with a large head, a short, rounded snout, with an obtuse canthus rostralis; the interorbital space is narrower than the upper eyelid; the tympanum is very distinct, three-fourths of the diameter of the eye. The fingers are moderate and obtuse, with the first much longer than the second, as long as third; the toes are webbed at the base and moderate; the subarticular tubercles are large; the inner metatarsal tubercle is very large, sharp-edged, shovel-shaped, and longer than the inner toe; no outer tubercle or tarsal fold is present. The tibiotarsal articulation reaches the shoulder or the tympanum. The skin is smooth above, and granular on the belly and under the thighs; a fold runs from the eye to the shoulder. Grayish or purplish above, it is indistinctly marbled with brown, sometimes with a fine, light vertebral line; a deep black streak runs from the end of the snout, through the nostril and the eye, to the shoulder, expanding in a round spot on the tympanum; the thighs are black above, whitishly marbled; the beneath is yellowish, and the throat is brown-spotted. It ranges in length from 2–3 in, snout to vent.

It is found in Mangalore and South Canara.
