= Nanorana arunachalensis =

Scientific classification
- Kingdom: Animalia
- Phylum: Chordata
- Class: Amphibia
- Order: Anura
- Family: Dicroglossidae
- Genus: Nanorana
- Species: N. arunachalensis

Binomial name
- Nanorana arunachalensis (Saikia, Sinha, and Kharkongor, 2017)

Synonyms
- Odorrana arunachalensis Saikia, Sinha, and Kharkongor, 2017

Species of frog

Nanorana arunachalensis is a species of frog in the family Ranidae that is found in streams of Lower Subansiri district, Arunachal Pradesh, India. The presence of black mark between this frog's eyes separate it from other frog species in this genus.
