= Nanorana mokokchungensis =

Conservation status
- Data Deficient (IUCN 3.1)

Scientific classification
- Kingdom: Animalia
- Phylum: Chordata
- Class: Amphibia
- Order: Anura
- Family: Dicroglossidae
- Genus: Nanorana
- Species: N. mokokchungensis

Binomial name
- Nanorana mokokchungensis (Das and Chanda, 2000)
- Nanorana mokokchungensis is only known from Mokokchung in Northeast India

Synonyms
- Scutiger mokokchungensis Das and Chanda, 2000; Paa mokokchungensis (Das and Chanda, 2000); Chaparana (Paa)mokokchungensis (Das and Chanda, 2000); Maculopaa mokokchungensis (Das and Chanda, 2000)

Species of frog

Nanorana mokokchungensis (common name: Mokokchung frog) is a species of frog in the family Dicroglossidae. It is endemic to Northeast India and only known from its type locality, Mokokchung in Nagaland.

== Description ==
Nanorana mokokchungensis is a robust-bodied and relatively large frog, reaching 87 mm (3.4 in) in snout–vent length. The snout is rounded and flattened. The eyes are large. The supra-tympanic fold is glandular, while the tympanum itself is absent. The forearms are robust. The finger tips are swollen but not dilated into discs; no webbing is present. The tibia are long and robust. The toes are moderately webbed and have weakly swollen tips. The dorsum bears large, scattered tubercles. Dorsal colouration is uniformly grey, but the upper eyelids are yellowish-grey. The thighs have diffuse crossbands. The ventral parts are cream with greyish variegations. Males have a subgular vocal sac.

== Habitat and conservation ==
Nanorana mokokchungensis is a semi-aquatic frog known from hill streams at elevations of 1,000–1,400 m (3,300–4,600 ft). It is a poorly known species; threats to it are unknown. It is protected by national legislation in India.
