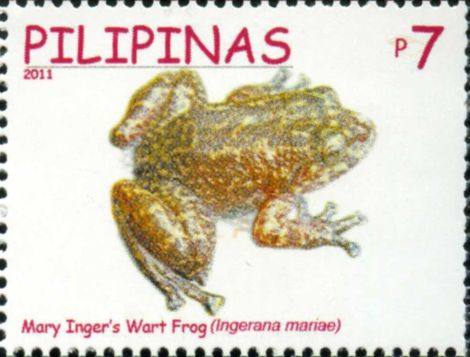

Conservation status
- Endangered (IUCN 3.1)

Scientific classification
- Kingdom: Animalia
- Phylum: Chordata
- Class: Amphibia
- Order: Anura
- Family: Ceratobatrachidae
- Genus: Alcalus
- Species: A. mariae

Binomial name
- Alcalus mariae (Inger, 1954)

Synonyms
- Micrixalus mariae Inger, 1954; Ingerana mariae (Inger, 1954)

= Alcalus mariae =

Species of amphibian

Alcalus mariae, common name Mary's frog or Palawan eastern frog, is a species of frog in the family Ceratobatrachidae. It is endemic to the Palawan Island, the Philippines, and only known from its type locality, Mount Balabag, in the Mantalingajan mountain range. The specific name refers to Mary Lee Inger née Ballew, first wife of Robert F. Inger who formally described the species in 1954.

== Description ==
The type series of Alcalus mariae consists of two males measuring 32 and 33 mm (1.3 and 1.3 in) in snout–vent length. They are stocky frogs with depressed, broad head and rounded snout. Tympanum is visible though rim hidden by skin. Tips of digits are expanded into large, round disks. Legs are stout and relatively short. Toes are webbed and have disks similar in size to those on fingers. Skin of all dorsal surfaces is coarsely shagreen. Chest and belly are strongly rugose but gular region is less so. Tubercles are present laterally.

== Habitat and conservation ==
The natural habitat of Alcalus mariae is lower montane forest where it occurs in the forest floor leaf-litter. Habitat loss is the most important threat to this species, although the area of type locality is generally well protected. The frog is the most evolutionarily distinct and globally endangered species in the Philippines, as listed by the Zoological Society of London in their EDGE species analysis, where it ranked 75th out of the thousands of amphibian species known to humanity.
