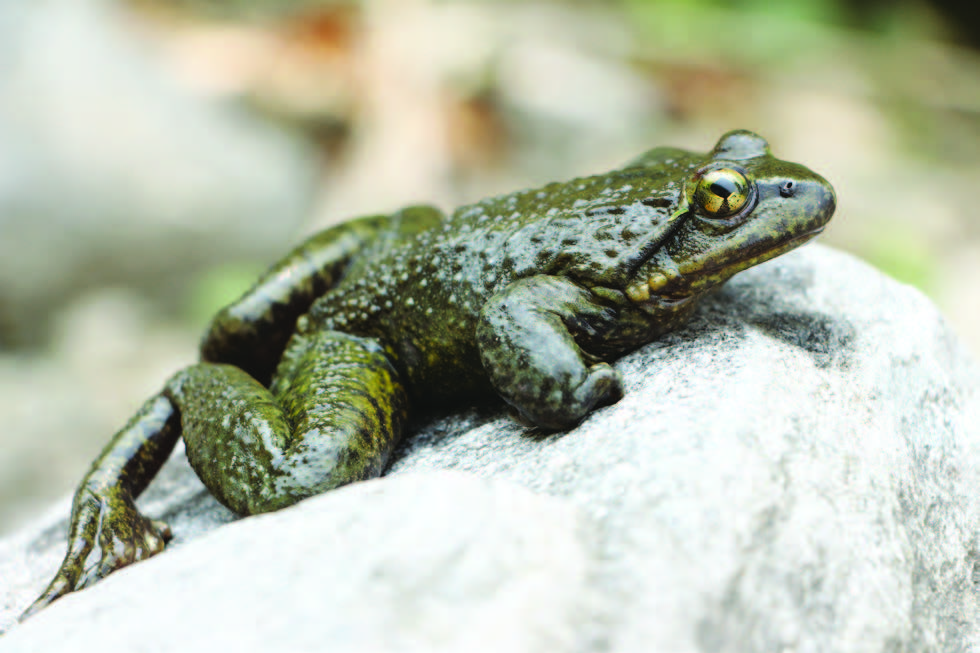
- Nanorana liebigii from Manaslu Conservation Area, Nepal

Conservation status
- Least Concern (IUCN 3.1)

Scientific classification
- Kingdom: Animalia
- Phylum: Chordata
- Class: Amphibia
- Order: Anura
- Family: Dicroglossidae
- Genus: Nanorana
- Species: N. liebigii

Binomial name
- Nanorana liebigii (Günther, 1860)

Synonyms
- Megalophrys gigas Blyth, 1855 "1854"– preoccupied by Rana gigas Walbaum, 1784; Rana liebigii Günther, 1860; Paa liebigii (Günther, 1860); Chaparana liebigii (Günther, 1860)

= Nanorana liebigii =

Species of frog

Nanorana liebigii, also known as Sikkim paa frog, Liebig's paa frog, Liebig's frog, and spiny-armed frog, is a species of frog in the family Dicroglossidae. It is found in the Himalayas, specifically in Bhutan, southern Tibet (China), northern India, and Nepal. The specific name liebigii honours a certain "Dr von Liebig Jr.", likely referring to Justus von Liebig, German botanist and chemist.

== Description ==
Nanorana liebigii are relatively large frogs: adult males measure 67–103 mm (2.6–4.1 in) and adult females 90–118 mm (3.5–4.6 in) in snout–vent length. The body is stocky. The head is wider than it is long, and the snout is rounded. The tympanum is faintly visible. The toes are fully webbed. Skin is rough with scattered warts on the back and sides.

Tadpoles have long tail that is twice as long as the body, for maximum total length of about 82 mm (3.2 in).

== Habitat and conservation ==
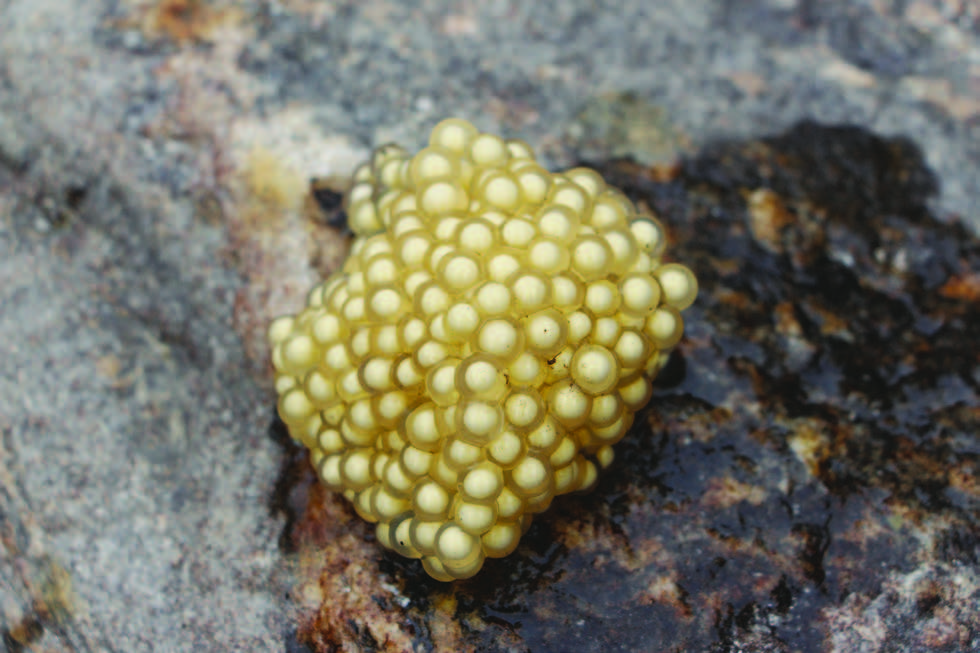
Eggmass deposited in a stream

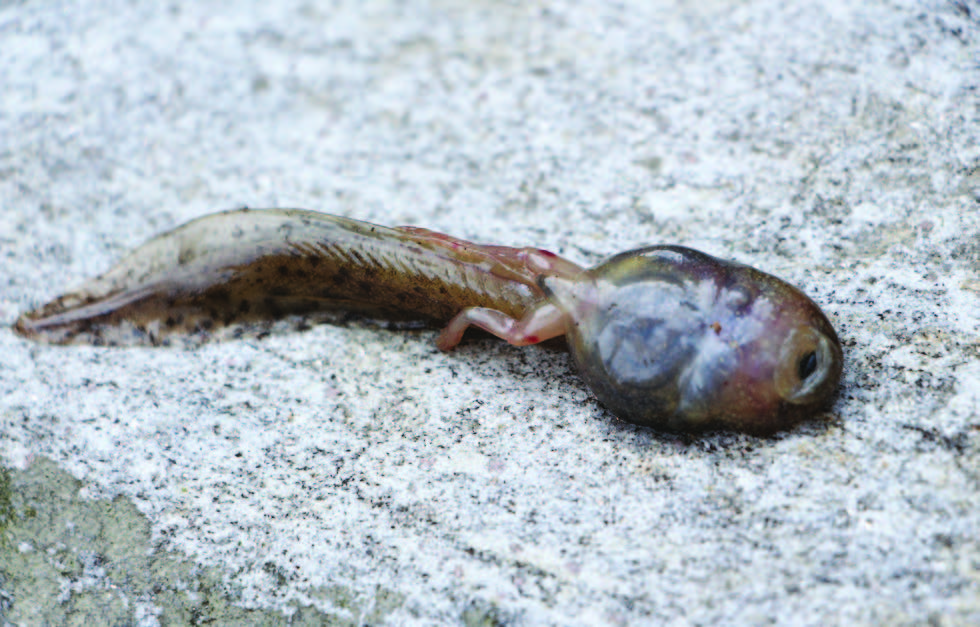
Tadpole undergoing metamorphosis

Nanorana liebigii is found in stream habitats in high-altitude shrubland at elevations of 1,500–3,500 m (4,900–11,500 ft) above sea level. Breeding takes place in streams, and the eggs are deposited in water under stones. Eggs clutches contain some 80–140 white eggs. Males have been reported to guard the eggs, but this behavior is not ubiquitous.

Nanorana liebigii is common in parts of its range, but is considered rare in Tibet. It is locally threatened by habitat loss caused by clearance of shrubland and changes in waterway management, such as dam construction. Furthermore, in Nepal, Nanorana liebigii is collected for human consumption, and is also alleged to have therapeutic benefits; this practice can lead to local depletion. It is present in some protected areas, including the Yadong National Nature Reserve (Tibet), Dihang-Dibang Biosphere Reserve (India), and Manaslu Conservation Area (Nepal). Nanorana liebigii is a protected species in India.
