= Nanorana maculosa =

Conservation status
- Vulnerable (IUCN 3.1)

Scientific classification
- Kingdom: Animalia
- Phylum: Chordata
- Class: Amphibia
- Order: Anura
- Family: Dicroglossidae
- Genus: Nanorana
- Species: N. maculosa

Binomial name
- Nanorana maculosa (Liu, Hu, and Yang, 1960)

Synonyms
- Rana maculosa Liu, Hu, and Yang, 1960); Paa maculosa (Liu, Hu, and Yang, 1960)

Species of amphibian

Nanorana maculosa (common names: spotted paa frog, Piebald spiny frog) is a species of frog in the family Dicroglossidae. It is endemic to central Yunnan, China, where it occurs in Jingdong County and Shuangbai County. This rare frog inhabits forest streams. It is threatened primarily by collection for human consumption. It is currently protected by the Ailaoshan and Wuliangshan National Nature Reserves.

Nanorana maculosa are relatively large frogs: males grow to a snout–vent length of about 86 mm (3.4 in) and females to 83 mm (3.3 in). Tadpoles are up to 46 mm (1.8 in) in length.
