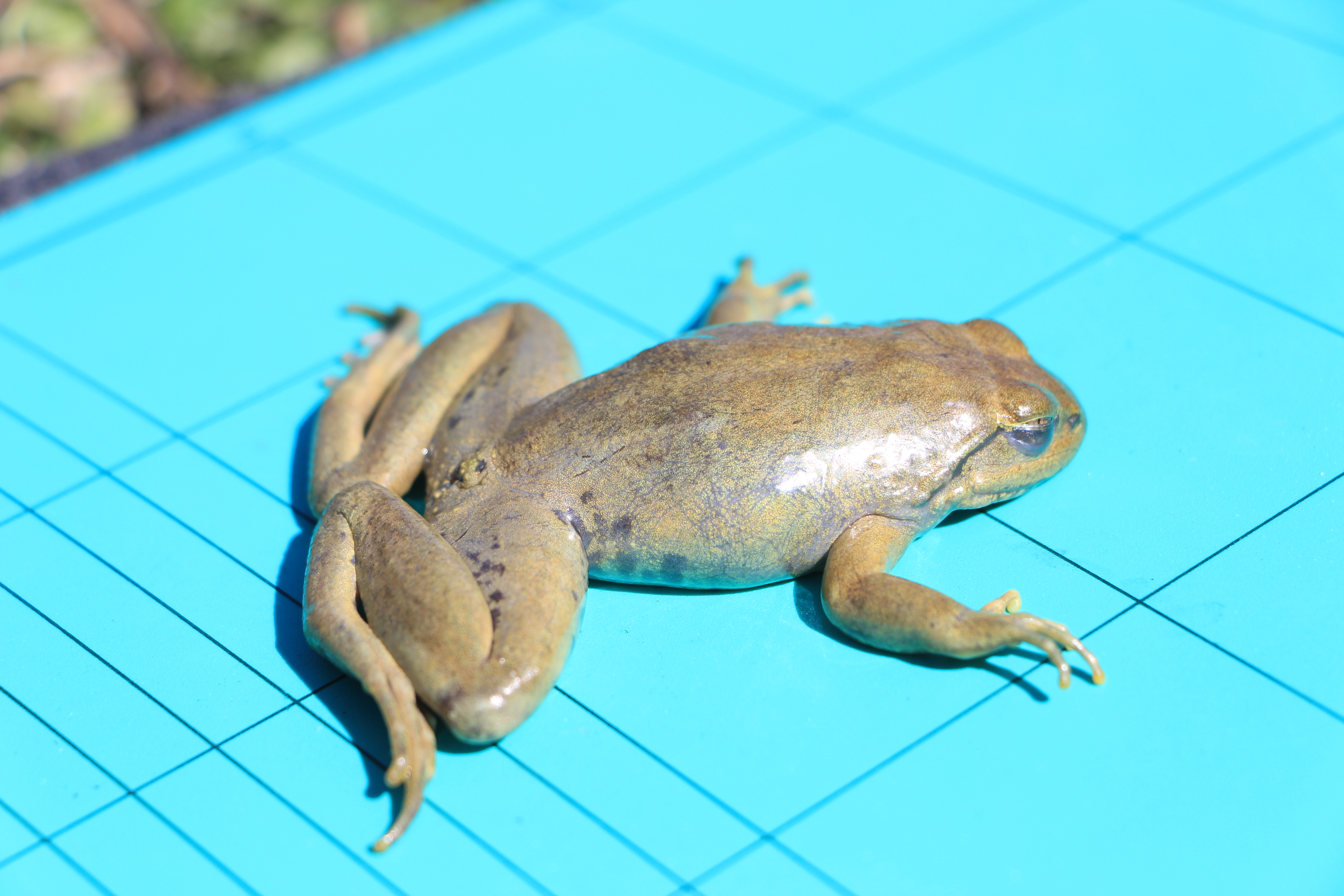
- Paa ercepeae from Lake Rara in Rara National Park, Nepal

Conservation status
- Near Threatened (IUCN 3.1)

Scientific classification
- Kingdom: Animalia
- Phylum: Chordata
- Class: Amphibia
- Order: Anura
- Family: Dicroglossidae
- Genus: Nanorana
- Species: N. ercepeae

Binomial name
- Nanorana ercepeae (Dubois, 1974)

Synonyms
- Rana ercepeae Dubois, 1974; Paa ercepeae (Dubois, 1974)

= Nanorana ercepeae =

Species of amphibian

Nanorana ercepeae (common names: torrent paa frog, R.C.P.'s paa frog) is a species of frog in the family Dicroglossidae. It is endemic to western Nepal. Its type locality is Torrent Jiuli Gad (type locality) in Bajhang district (previously Far-Western Nepal and now Sudurpaschim Province). This relatively rare frog is found in stream habitats in upland temperate rainforests. One specimen of P. ercepeae was recorded from the still-water habitats of Rara Lake in Rara National Park. It is threatened by habitat loss and degradation caused by small-scale agricultural development and wood extraction.

== Description ==
An average adult frog would measure 75.2 mm (SVL), the snout is rounded, and the head is broader than long (HW 30.3 mm, HL 22.2 mm). The canthus is weakly developed (blunt) and rounded, fully-fledged supra-tympanic fold but the tympanum is indistinct. Nostril is closer to the eye than to the snout (EN 3.6 mm, NS 5.2 mm). The loreal region is slightly concave and the nostril is dorsolaterally positioned. Eyes are large (EL 8.5 mm, 28% of HW) with patchy iris and rhombus-shaped pupils. The interorbital distance is larger than the upper eyelid width (IOD 7.5 mm, UEW 5.7 mm). Vomerine teeth and one set of maxillary teeth are present.

Finger/toe tips are rounded into small discs. No webbing in fingers but toes are fully webbed. The relative length of fingers follows the pattern I<II<IV<III. Inner metacarpal tubercles and subarticular tubercles in fingers are distinct. Hindlimbs are long and sturdy but thighs are shorter than the tibia (FL 38.1 mm, TL 41.3 mm). The relative length of toes follows the style I<II<V<III<IV. The inner metatarsal tubercle is large, while the outer metatarsal tubercle is indistinct. Dorsal skin is entirely smooth, including the head and lateral parts of the body, and dorsolateral folds absent. The cloacal aperture is quite prominent.
