= Limnonectes liui =

Conservation status
- Vulnerable (IUCN 3.1)

Scientific classification
- Kingdom: Animalia
- Phylum: Chordata
- Class: Amphibia
- Order: Anura
- Family: Dicroglossidae
- Genus: Limnonectes
- Species: L. liui

Binomial name
- Limnonectes liui (Yang, 1983)

Synonyms
- Platymantis liui Yang, 1983; Liurana liui (Yang, 1983); Micrixalus liui (Yang, 1983); Taylorana liui (Yang, 1983); Ingerana liui (Yang, 1983)

Species of frog

Limnonectes liui is a species of frog in the family Dicroglossidae. It is found in Yunnan, China, but it likely occurs also in nearby Laos and Myanmar. The taxonomic placement of this species has been much debated and varies between sources.

Limnonectes liui are relatively small frogs: males grow to a snout–vent length of about 35 mm (1.4 in) and females to 33 mm (1.3 in). They can be found in or near streams in forested areas. Males guard the eggs are laid in a hole in the ground covered with leaves. The eggs develop directly into small froglets.

Limnonectes liui are threatened by habitat loss caused by agriculture and infrastructure development for tourism.
