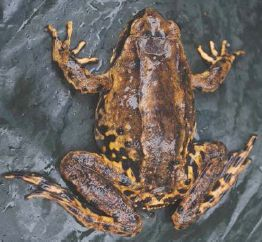
- Nanorana conaensis from Haa District, Bhutan

Conservation status
- Data Deficient (IUCN 3.1)

Scientific classification
- Kingdom: Animalia
- Phylum: Chordata
- Class: Amphibia
- Order: Anura
- Family: Dicroglossidae
- Genus: Nanorana
- Species: N. conaensis

Binomial name
- Nanorana conaensis (Fei & Huang, 1981)

Synonyms
- Paa conaensis (Fei & Huang, 1981)

= Nanorana conaensis =

Species of amphibian

Nanorana conaensis (Cona paa frog, Cona spiny frog) is a species of frog in the family Dicroglossidae. Its name refers to its type locality, Mama in Cona County in Tibet. Note that while large parts of Cona County are located within Arunachal Pradesh in the area that is controlled by India but claimed by China, Mama is on the Tibetan side of the border. It has recently been reported also from Bhutan. Its natural habitats are subtropical moist montane forest, high-altitude shrubland, and rivers.

Nanorana conaensis are medium-sized frogs: males grow to a snout–vent length of about 58 mm (2.3 in) and females to 55 mm (2.2 in). Tadpoles are up to 65 mm (2.6 in) in length.
