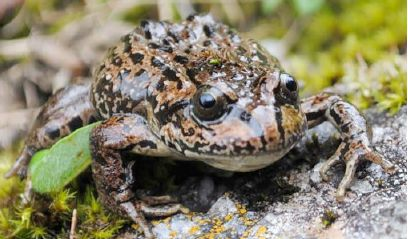
- Nanorana pleskei from Haa District, Bhutan

Conservation status
- Least Concern (IUCN 3.1)

Scientific classification
- Kingdom: Animalia
- Phylum: Chordata
- Class: Amphibia
- Order: Anura
- Family: Dicroglossidae
- Genus: Nanorana
- Species: N. pleskei

Binomial name
- Nanorana pleskei Günther, 1896

= Nanorana pleskei =

Species of amphibian

Nanorana pleskei (common names: Songpan slow frog, Pleske's high altitude frog, plateau frog) is a species of frog in the family Dicroglossidae. Until recently it has been only known from southwestern/central western China (Yunnan, Sichuan, Qinghai, southeastern Gansu) from elevations between 3,300–4,500 m (10,800–14,800 ft), but there is now one record also from Bhutan. Notice, however, that earlier records outside China have turned out to be misidentifications.

Its natural habitats are subtropical high-altitude shrubland, grassland, rivers, swamps, intermittent freshwater marshes, and ponds. It is threatened by habitat loss.

Nanorana pleskei are relatively small frogs: males grow to a snout–vent length of about 32 mm (1.3 in) and females to 36 mm (1.4 in). Tadpoles are up to about 41 mm (1.6 in) in length.
