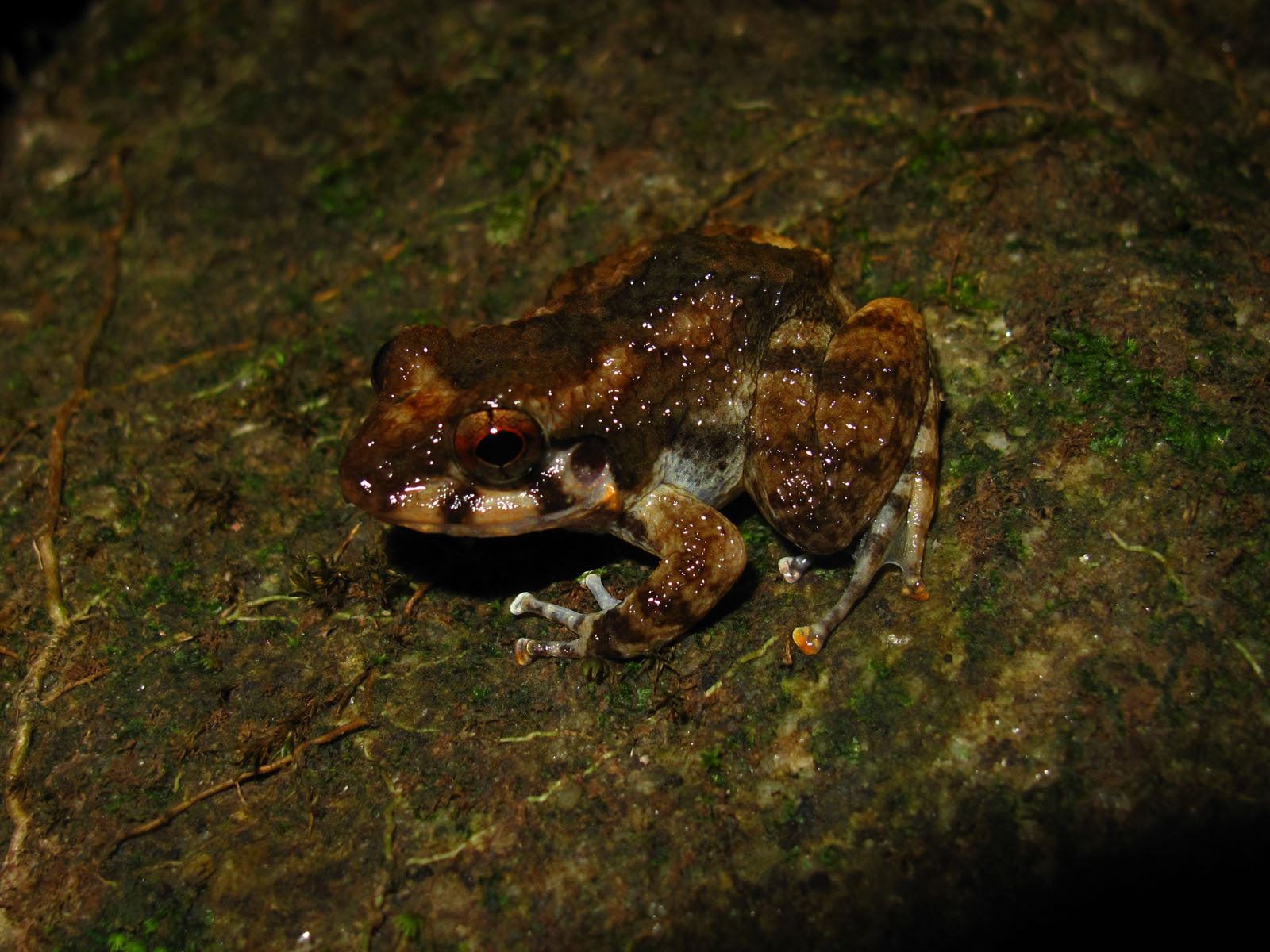
- Alcalus tasanae from Thailand

Scientific classification
- Kingdom: Animalia
- Phylum: Chordata
- Class: Amphibia
- Order: Anura
- Family: Ceratobatrachidae
- Subfamily: Alcalinae; Brown, Siler, Richards, Diesmos, and Cannatella, 2015
- Genus: Alcalus; Brown, Siler, Richards, Diesmos, and Cannatella, 2015

Type species
- Micrixalus mariae Inger, 1954

Species
- 5 species (see text)

= Alcalus =

Genus of amphibians

Alcalus is a small genus of frogs in the family Ceratobatrachidae. It is the only member of the subfamily Alcalinae. Its sister taxon is Ceratobatrachinae. Common name Alcala's dwarf mountain frogs has been proposed for the genus. They are found in Palawan Island (the Philippines), Borneo, and the Malay Peninsula. They prefer semi-aquatic microhabitats.

== Etymology ==
The genus is named in honour of Angel Alcala, a Filipino biologist who has worked with Southeast Asian amphibians.

== Description ==
Compared to the closely related genera Cornufer and Platymantis, Alcalus have an intermediate body size (based on Alcalus baluensis and A. mariae, males measure 20–37 mm (0.79–1.46 in) and females 26–43 mm (1.0–1.7 in) in snout–vent length). The head is broad. Skin is coarsely textured, shagreened, or ‘wrinkled’ in appearance. The toe discs are widely expanded; inter-digital webbing is extensive. Males have nuptial pads but lack vocal sacs.

== Species ==
There are five species:

- Alcalus baluensis (Boulenger, 1896)
- Alcalus mariae (Inger, 1954)
- Alcalus rajae (Iskandar, Bickford, and Arifin, 2011)
- Alcalus sariba (Shelford, 1905)
- Alcalus tasanae (Smith, 1921)
