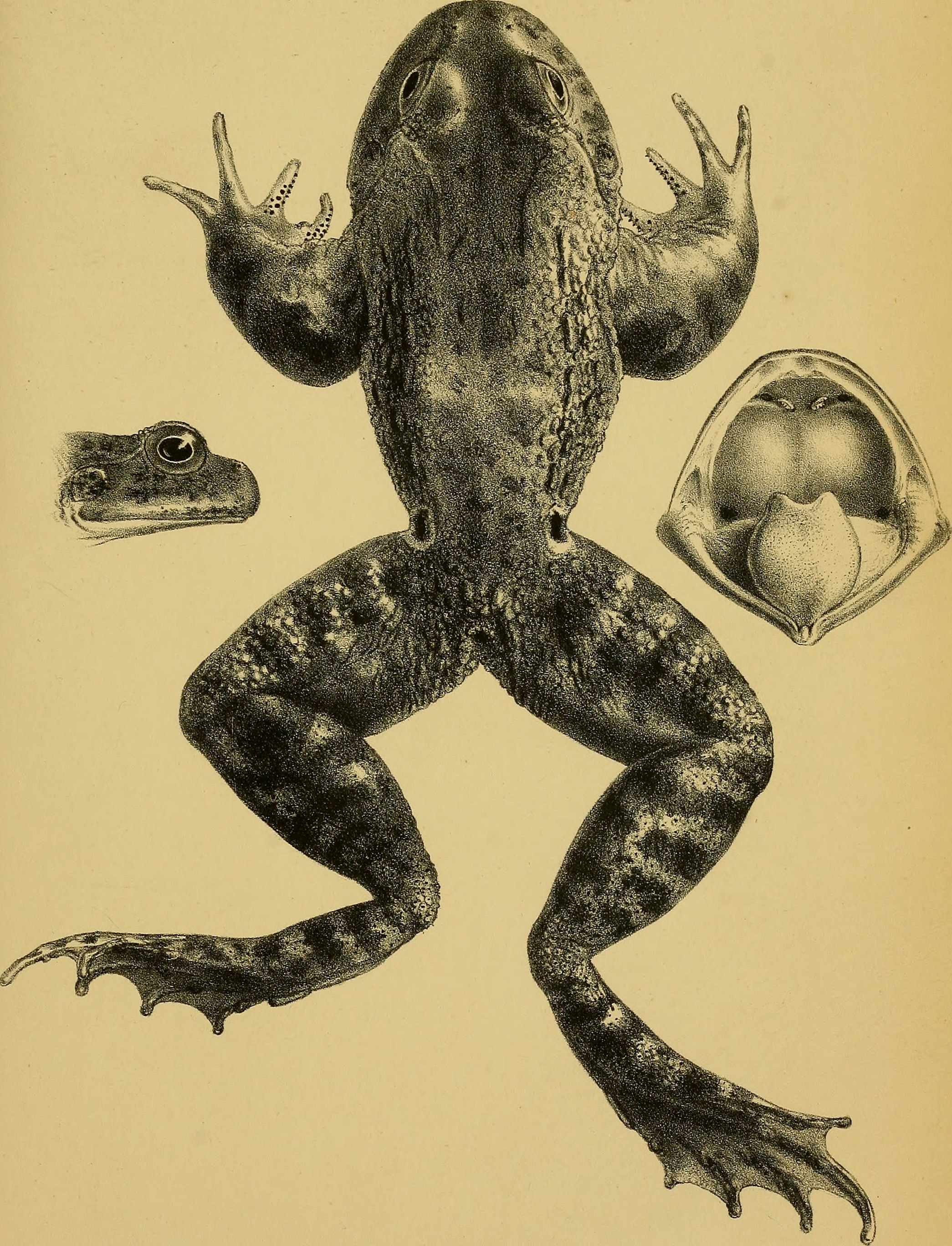

Conservation status
- Data Deficient (IUCN 3.1)

Scientific classification
- Kingdom: Animalia
- Phylum: Chordata
- Class: Amphibia
- Order: Anura
- Family: Dicroglossidae
- Genus: Nanorana
- Species: N. feae

Binomial name
- Nanorana feae (Boulenger, 1887)

Synonyms
- Rana feae Boulenger, 1887; Paa feae (Boulenger, 1887)

= Nanorana feae =

Species of amphibian

Nanorana feae (common names: Kakhien paa frog, ocellated spiny frog) is a species of frog in the family Dicroglossidae. It is found in Yunnan, China, and the Kachin Hills in Myanmar. The specific name feae honors Leonardo Fea, an Italian explorer, zoologist, and naturalist. This little-known species probably inhabits hill streams in forested areas.

Nanorana feae are relatively large frogs, attaining a snout–vent length of about 92 mm (3.6 in).
