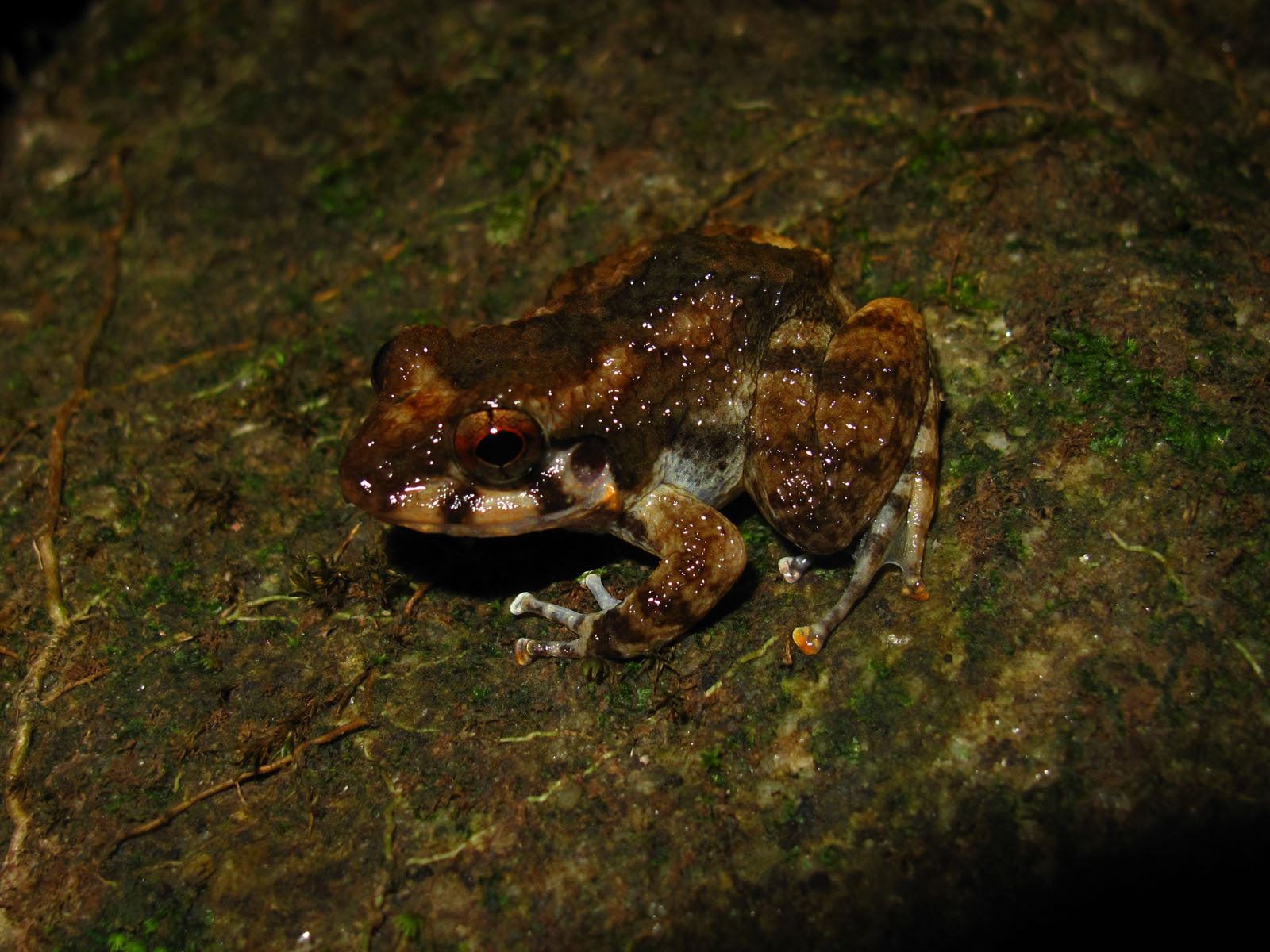

Conservation status
- Least Concern (IUCN 3.1)

Scientific classification
- Kingdom: Animalia
- Phylum: Chordata
- Class: Amphibia
- Order: Anura
- Family: Ceratobatrachidae
- Genus: Alcalus
- Species: A. tasanae

Binomial name
- Alcalus tasanae (Smith, 1921)

Synonyms
- Rana tasanae Smith, 1921; Ingerana tasanae (Smith, 1921)

= Smith's wrinkled frog =

Species of amphibian

Smith's wrinkled frog (Alcalus tasanae), commonly known as Tasan eastern frog, Tasan frog, or Tha san frog,) is a species of frog in the family Dicroglossidae. It is found in western and southern Thailand; its range likely extends to Myanmar but it has not yet been recorded there. Its natural habitats are primary rainforests near streams. It is threatened by habitat loss.
