= Nanorana parkeri =

Conservation status
- Least Concern (IUCN 3.1)

Scientific classification
- Kingdom: Animalia
- Phylum: Chordata
- Class: Amphibia
- Order: Anura
- Family: Dicroglossidae
- Genus: Nanorana
- Species: N. parkeri

Binomial name
- Nanorana parkeri (Stejneger, 1927)

Synonyms
- Altirana parkeri Stejneger, 1927

Species of amphibian

Nanorana parkeri (common names: High Himalaya frog, Xizang Plateau frog, Parker's slow frog, mountain slow frog) is a species of frogs in the family Dicroglossidae. It is found in Tibet (China) and in Nepal, but it is expected to be found also in Bhutan and parts of India. It is the second amphibian, and the first Neobatrachian, to have its whole genome published.

== Description ==
Nanorana parkeri are medium-sized frogs: males grow to a snout–vent length of about 44 mm (1.7 in) and females to 48 mm (1.9 in). Tadpoles are up to about 51 mm (2.0 in) in length.

== Genome ==
The genome is about 2.3 Gb in size, encoding more than 20,000 protein-coding genes.

== Online Model Organism Database ==
Xenbase provides partial support (BLAST, JBrowse tracks, genome download) for Nanorana parkeri.

== Habitat and conservation ==
This very common frog is found on high-altitude grasslands, forests, shrubs, lakes, ponds, marshes, streams and rivers in the Tibetan Plateau at elevations of 2,850–5,000 m (9,350–16,400 ft) above sea level. It an explosive breeder in streams and marshes. There are no known major threats.
