= Manaslu Conservation Area =

Protected area in Nepal

- Nepali: मनास्लु संरक्षण क्षेत्र
- IUCN category VI (protected area with sustainable use of natural resources)
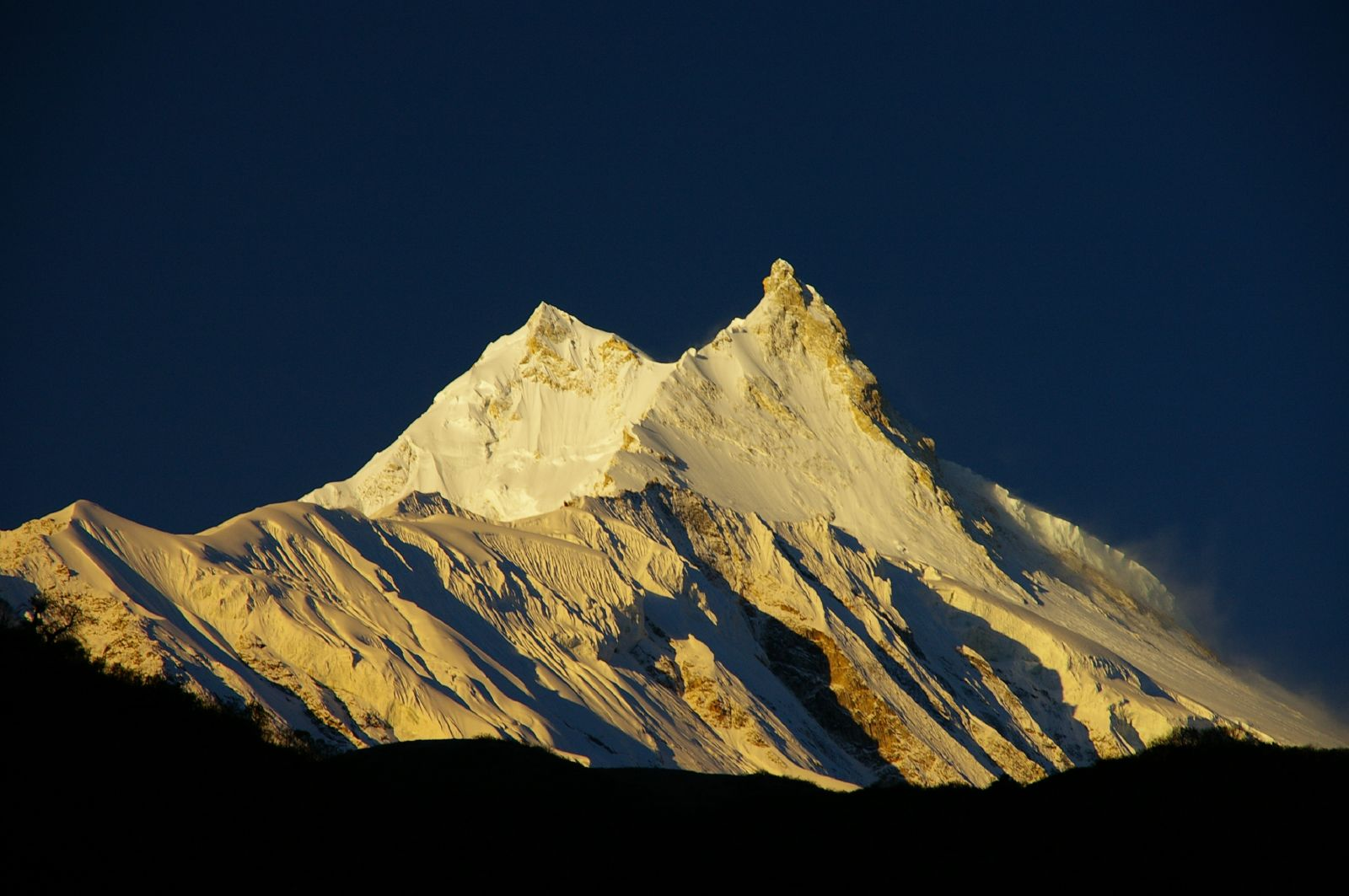
- Manaslu

- Location within Gandaki Province Location within Nepal Location within South Asia
- Location: Nepal
- Coordinates: 28°32′46″N 84°50′31″E
- Area: 1,663 km^{2} (642 sq mi)
- Established: 1998
- Governing body: Department of National Parks and Wildlife Conservation

The Manaslu Conservation Area is a protected area in Nepal. Established in 1998, it covers 1,663 km^{2} (642 sq mi) in the Mansiri Himal range of the Himalayas in the Gorkha District. The area comprises mountains, glaciers, and watercourses. In elevation, the area ranges from 1,400 to 8,156 m (4,593 to 26,759 ft), the highest point being the peak of Manaslu.

== Flora and fauna ==
The region is home to 33 species of mammals including snow leopard, musk deer and Himalayan tahr. There are over 110 species of birds and three species of reptiles and about 1,500–2,000 species of flowering plants. At least four species of frogs are present: Amolops formosus, Nanorana liebigii, Ombrana sikimensis and Duttaphrynus himalayanus. Its bio-climatic zones vary from sub-tropical to nival.
