= Nanorana yunnanensis =

Conservation status
- Endangered (IUCN 3.1)

Scientific classification
- Kingdom: Animalia
- Phylum: Chordata
- Class: Amphibia
- Order: Anura
- Family: Dicroglossidae
- Genus: Nanorana
- Species: N. yunnanensis

Binomial name
- Nanorana yunnanensis (Anderson, 1879)

Synonyms
- Rana yunnanensis Anderson, 1879; Paa yunnanensis (Anderson, 1879); Rana phrynoides Boulenger, 1917; Rana muta Su and Li, 1986; Rana liui Dubois, 1987; Nanorana liui (Dubois, 1987); Nanorana bourreti (Dubois, 1987); Paa bourreti (Dubois, 1987)

Species of amphibian

Nanorana yunnanensis, commonly known as Yunnan paa frog, Yunnan spiny frog, Bourret's paa frog or Bourret's frog, is a species of frog in the family Dicroglossidae. It is found in southwestern China, Vietnam, Myanmar, northern Thailand, and likely in the intervening Laos. Its natural habitats are small and large streams in montane forests, scrub vegetation and grasslands, and it has also been found in ditches. It is threatened primarily by collection for human consumption, but also by habitat loss caused by agricultural development and infrastructure development.

Nanorana yunnanensis are relatively large frogs: males grow to a snout–vent length of about 98 mm (3.9 in) and females to 99 mm (3.9 in). Tadpoles are up to 52 mm (2.0 in) in length.
