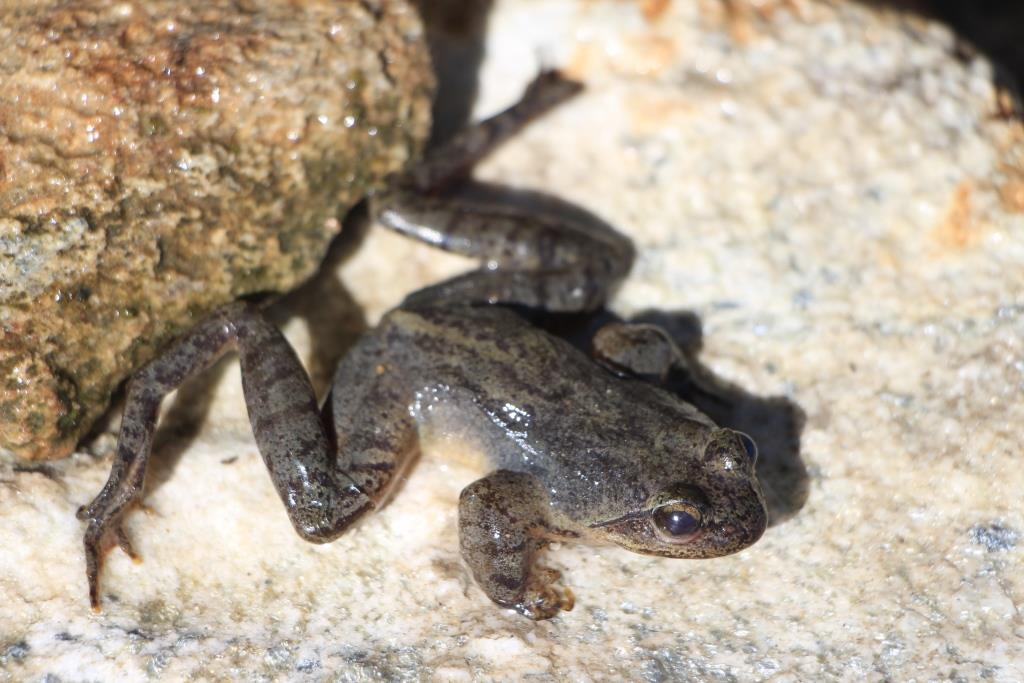
- Paa rarica from Lake Rara in Rara National Park, Nepal

Conservation status
- Data Deficient (IUCN 3.1)

Scientific classification
- Kingdom: Animalia
- Phylum: Chordata
- Class: Amphibia
- Order: Anura
- Family: Dicroglossidae
- Genus: Nanorana
- Species: N. rarica

Binomial name
- Nanorana rarica (Dubois, Matsui, and Ohler, 2001)

Synonyms
- Rana (Paa) rara Dubois and Matsui, 1983 — preoccupied by Rana danubina var. rara Fraas, 1903; Paa (Paa) rarica Dubois, Matsui, and Ohler, 2001 — replacement name

= Nanorana rarica =

Species of amphibian

Nanorana rarica, also called Rara paa frog, Rara Lake frog, is a frog species in the family Dicroglossidae. It is endemic to western Nepal. Its type locality is the eponymous Rara Lake

== Description ==
Adult males measure 37–46 mm (1.5–1.8 in), subadult males 27–30 mm (1.1–1.2 in), and subadult females 26–35 mm (1.0–1.4 in) in snout–vent length. The snout is rounded. The tympanum is not very distinct whereas the supratymapnic fold is prominent. Adult males have enlarged forelimbs. During the reproductive period, adult males have black, horny nuptial spines on their chest and forelimbs. The fingers are not webbed. The toes are long and webbed to their tips, although the webbing is strongly incurved between the toes. Preserved individuals are greyish above and have warts with blackish spots. There are numerous blackish markings on the head. The upper parts of the limbs have crossbars. The lower parts of the body and the limbs are whitish, while the throat is greyish.

The tadpoles of Gosner stage 37 measure about 48–56 mm (1.9–2.2 in) in total length and 16–20 mm (0.63–0.79 in) in body length. They have a large oral disc and a muscular tail with not so well-developed caudal fin. Tadpoles are semi-transparent in appearance with dark patches near the tail region. They have a pair of prominent eyes, nares, and developing opercula. The mouth opening, including the upper and lower jaw sheath, is completely black.

== Habitat and conservation ==
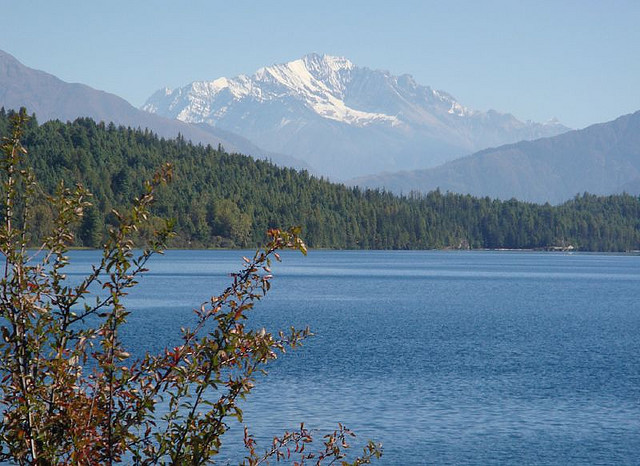
Nanorana rarica, also known as Rara Lake frog, was first collected in Rara Lake.

The habitat and ecological requirements of this species are poorly known. It is known from the Lake Rara at an elevation of about 3,000 m (9,800 ft) above sea level, and is associated with tropical montane forest. One specimen was found along the outlet stream called Nijar Khola that runs slowly through the Majghatta, Murma village which is the closest settlement to the National Park. Threats to this species are not known.
