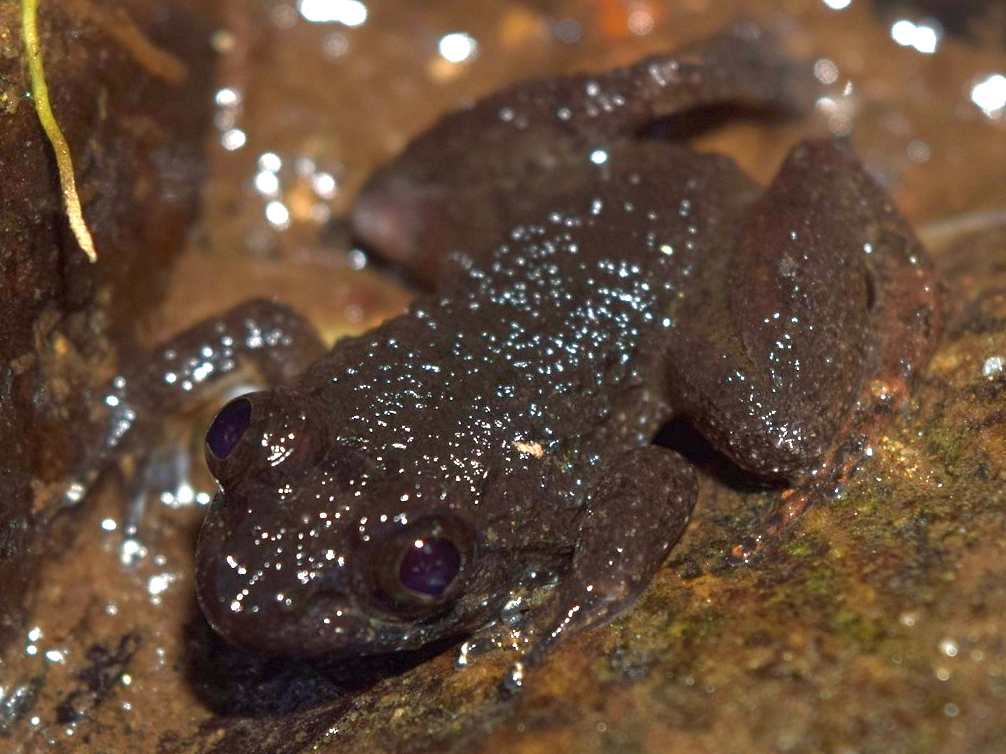

Conservation status
- Near Threatened (IUCN 3.1)

Scientific classification
- Kingdom: Animalia
- Phylum: Chordata
- Class: Amphibia
- Order: Anura
- Family: Ceratobatrachidae
- Genus: Alcalus
- Species: A. rajae

Binomial name
- Alcalus rajae (Iskandar, Bickford, and Arifin, 2011)

Synonyms
- Ingerana rajae Iskandar, Bickford, and Arifin, 2011

= Alcalus rajae =

Species of frog

Alcalus rajae, sometimes known as king dwarf mountain frog, is a species of frog in the family Ceratobatrachidae, subfamily Alcalinae. It is endemic to Kalimantan, Borneo (Indonesia), and known from its type locality in the Bukit Baka Bukit Raya National Park, as well as the Gunung Penrissen Nature Reserve, both in the West Kalimantan province, and from the Meratus Protected Forest in the South Kalimantan province. The specific name rajae refers to the type locality: Bukit Raya is the highest mountain in Kalimantan, getting its name from the Indonesian word raya (or raja), signifying the majestic size of the peak. It also alludes to the relatively large size of this species relative to its (then) congeners.

== Description ==
Adult females reach 40 mm (1.6 in) in snout–vent length. The overall appearance is stocky. The snout is rounded. The head is slightly wider than it is long. The tympanum is not externally visible, with tympanic annulus being hidden under skin and covered with muscle. A distinct supratympanic fold is nevertheless present. The limbs are short. The fingers have narrow fringes and wide, truncated and flattened tips (discs). The toes are essentially fully webbed and bear similar discs as the fingers. Skin is granular. Dorsal coloration is uniformly light to dark brown or blackish, without any specific markings. The hind limbs have three indistinct darker crossbars. There are few, scattered white spots on the sides of body and head, the lower parts of the flanks, as well as on the hands and limbs. All digits have a white crossbar straddling middle of the truncated, flat disk. The iris is dark brown with indistinct reticulation.

== Habitat and conservation ==
Alcalus rajae occurs in primary undisturbed and secondary forests near seepage areas close to small and slow-moving streams and swamps. Its altitudinal range is 200–1,200 m (660–3,940 ft). Its morphology (fully webbed toes and absence of tympanic annulus) suggests that it is aquatic. It is probably an egg-laying species.

This species occurs in the well-protected Bukit Baka-Bukit Raya National Park, but habitat loss is occurring outside the reserve. Meratus Protected Forest also has intact forest remaining. In contrast, most of the original vegetation in the Gunung Penrissen Nature Reserve has been lost because of slash-and-burn activities and tourism and recreational development. Outside the known sites, the species would be likely suffering from deforestation caused by oil palm plantations and forestry concessions.
