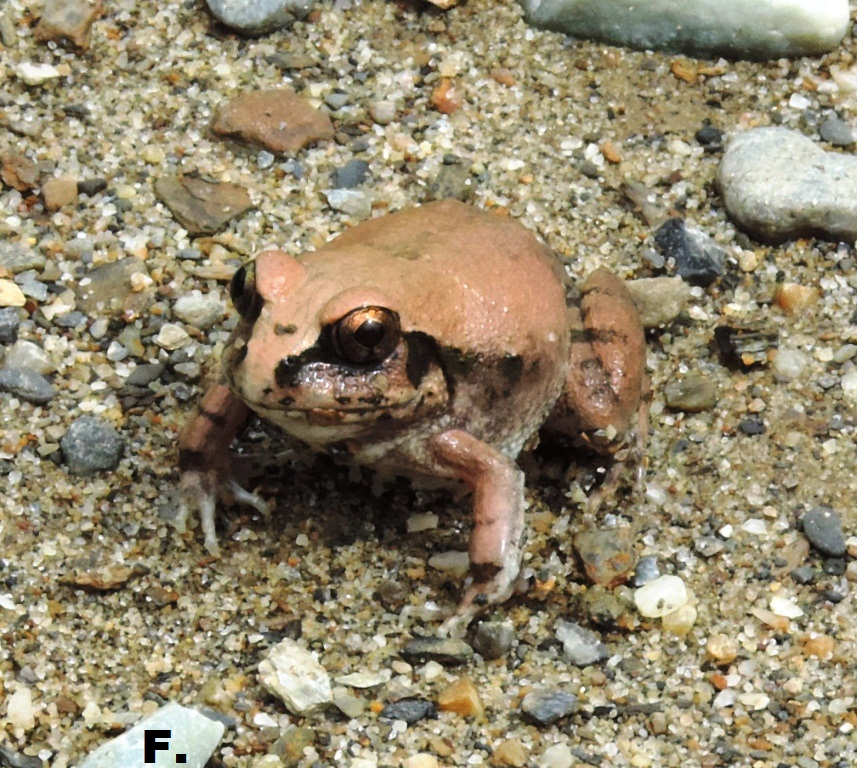
- Sphaerotheca maskeyi from Korak Village, Chitwan district, Nepal

Conservation status
- Least Concern (IUCN 3.1)

Scientific classification
- Kingdom: Animalia
- Phylum: Chordata
- Class: Amphibia
- Order: Anura
- Family: Dicroglossidae
- Genus: Sphaerotheca
- Species: S. maskeyi

Binomial name
- Sphaerotheca maskeyi (Schleich & Anders, 1998)

= Sphaerotheca maskeyi =

Species of frog

Sphaerotheca maskeyi is a species of frog in the family Ranidae found in Nepal and possibly Bhutan and India. Its natural habitats are subtropical or tropical moist lowland forests, subtropical or tropical seasonally wet or flooded lowland grassland, swamps, intermittent freshwater lakes, and freshwater marshes.
