= Nanorana minica =

Conservation status
- Least Concern (IUCN 3.1)

Scientific classification
- Kingdom: Animalia
- Phylum: Chordata
- Class: Amphibia
- Order: Anura
- Family: Dicroglossidae
- Genus: Nanorana
- Species: N. minica

Binomial name
- Nanorana minica (Dubois, 1975)

Synonyms
- Rana tuberculata Tilak & Roy, 1985; Paa minica (Dubois, 1975)

Species of frog

Nanorana minica (common names: Nepal paa frog, tiny frog, small paa frog) is a species of frog in the family Dicroglossidae. It is found in northern India (Uttar Pradesh and Himachal Pradesh) and in western and eastern Nepal. It is a fairly common species found in subtropical montane forest and streams. It is threatened by habitat loss through the localized clearance of forest. Tadpoles of this N. minica has been reported to overwinter in the streams. Stream flow management and subsequent habitat modification by check dams is one of the threats the species is facing and check dams have been found to influence the overwintering tadpoles' behavior, habitat use patterns and morphometric traits.
