= Nanorana arnoldi =

Conservation status
- Data Deficient (IUCN 3.1)

Scientific classification
- Kingdom: Animalia
- Phylum: Chordata
- Class: Amphibia
- Order: Anura
- Family: Dicroglossidae
- Genus: Nanorana
- Species: N. arnoldi

Binomial name
- Nanorana arnoldi (Dubois, 1975)

Synonyms
- Paa arnoldi (Dubois, 1975)

Species of amphibian

Nanorana arnoldi (common name: Arnold's paa frog) is a large species of frog in the family Dicroglossidae. It is found in southwestern China (Tibet, Yunnan), northern Myanmar, eastern Nepal, and adjacent northeastern India. Its natural habitats are subtropical or tropical moist montane forest, rivers, and freshwater springs. It is primarily threatened by collection for consumption, but also by habitat loss.
