= Chhokangparo =

- Village
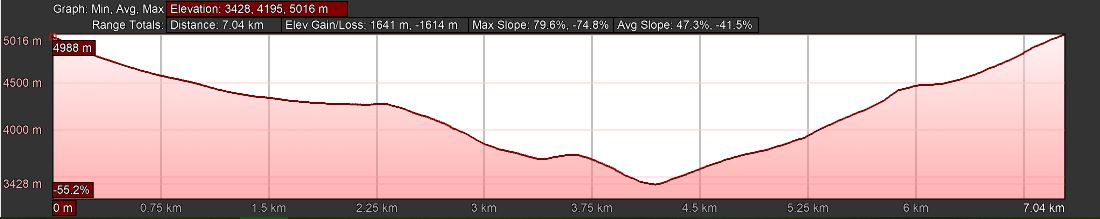
- Elevation profile of Chhokangparo

- Map showing location of Chhokangparo Chhokangparo (Nepal)
- Coordinates: 28°34′58.83″N 85°6′56.23″E
- Country: Nepal
- Province: Gandaki

Area
  - Total: 7.64 km^{2} (2.95 sq mi)
  - Land: 7.07 km^{2} (2.73 sq mi)
  - Water: 0.57 km^{2} (0.22 sq mi)
- Elevation: 3,501 m (11,486 ft)

Chhokangparo, or Chhokang Paro, is a small village nestled deep in the Tsum Valley of Gandaki Province; it is only just inside Nepal, as the Nepal-Chinese border is only 11.60 kilometres (7.21 mi) away when heading due north. The Mu-Chhule Nile river runs through the valley below.>
