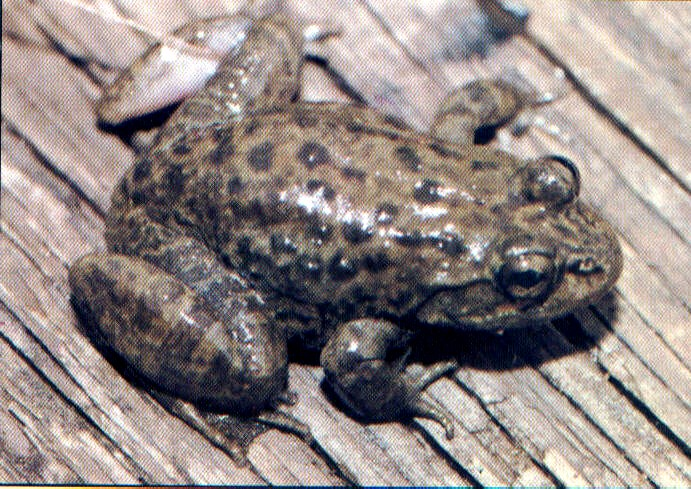
- Allopaa hazarensis

Scientific classification
- Kingdom: Animalia
- Phylum: Chordata
- Class: Amphibia
- Order: Anura
- Family: Dicroglossidae
- Subfamily: Dicroglossinae
- Genus: Allopaa; Ohler and Dubois, 2006

Type species
- Rana hazarensis Dubois and Khan, 1979

Species
- 2, see text.

= Allopaa =

Genus of amphibians

Allopaa is a small genus of frogs in the family Dicroglossidae. Their distribution is restricted to Kashmir region of India and Pakistan. The phylogenetic placement of this genus has not been addressed with molecular methods and remains uncertain.

== Species ==
There are only two recognized species in the genus Allopaa:

- Allopaa barmoachensis (Khan and Tasnim, 1989)
- Allopaa hazarensis (Dubois and Khan, 1979)

Allopaa barmoachensis might be a synonym of Allopaa hazarensis.
