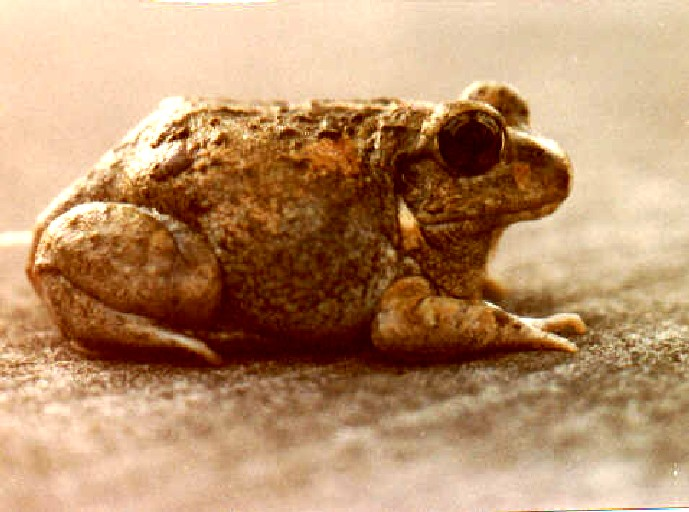
- Sphaerotheca breviceps

Scientific classification
- Domain: Eukaryota
- Kingdom: Animalia
- Phylum: Chordata
- Class: Amphibia
- Order: Anura
- Family: Dicroglossidae
- Subfamily: Dicroglossinae
- Genus: Sphaerotheca; Günther, 1859

Type species
- Sphaerotheca strigata Günther, 1859 "1858"

Species
- 9, see text.

= Sphaerotheca (frog) =

Genus of amphibians

Sphaerotheca is a genus of frogs in the family Dicroglossidae. They can be found in South Asia. Molecular data suggest that they are closely related to Fejervarya. Ecologically, they are burrowing frogs.

== Species ==
There are currently 9 recognized species in Sphaerotheca:

- Sphaerotheca bengaluru Deepak, Dinesh, Ohler, Shanker, Channakeshavamurthy & Ashadevi, 2020
- Sphaerotheca breviceps (Schneider, 1799)
- Sphaerotheca dobsoni (Boulenger, 1882)
- Sphaerotheca leucorhynchus (Rao, 1937)
- Sphaerotheca maskeyi (Schleich and Anders, 1998)
- Sphaerotheca pluvialis (Jerdon, 1853)
- Sphaerotheca rolandae (Dubois, 1983)
- Sphaerotheca strachani (Murray, 1884)
- Sphaerotheca varshaabhu Deepak, Dinesh, Chetan Nag, Ohler, Shanker, Souza, Prasad, and Ashadevi, 2024

The status of Sphaerotheca swani is disputed, with Deepak and colleagues (2024) arguing for its recognition (as is done by AmphibiaWeb), whereas it is considered a synonym of Sphaerotheca breviceps by the Amphibian Species of the World.
