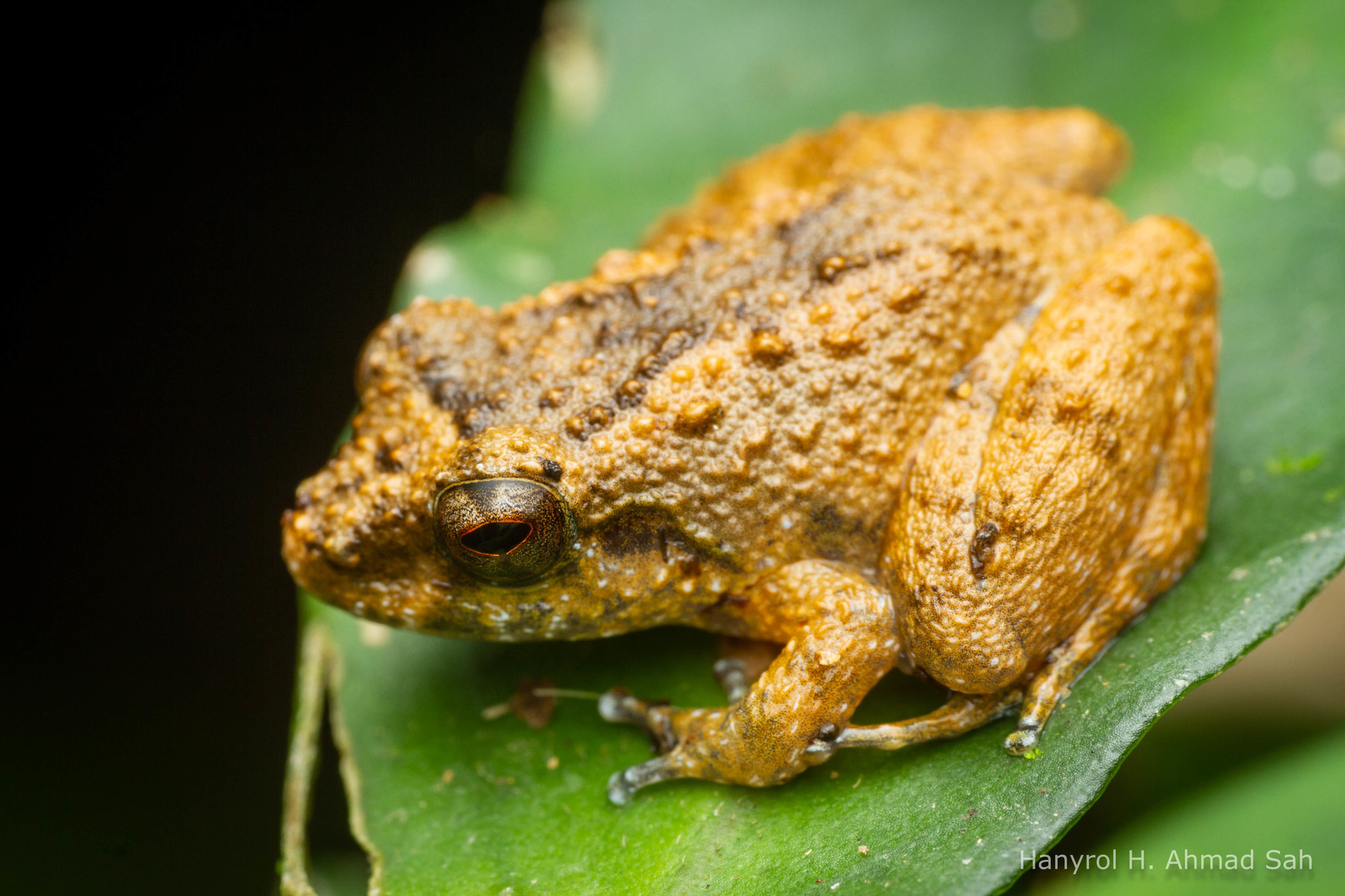

Conservation status
- Least Concern (IUCN 3.1)

Scientific classification
- Kingdom: Animalia
- Phylum: Chordata
- Class: Amphibia
- Order: Anura
- Family: Ceratobatrachidae
- Genus: Alcalus
- Species: A. baluensis

Binomial name
- Alcalus baluensis (Boulenger, 1896)

Synonyms
- Cornufer baluensis Boulenger, 1896; Micrixalus baluensis (Boulenger, 1896); Ingerana baluensis (Boulenger, 1896)

= Alcalus baluensis =

Species of amphibian

Alcalus baluensis is a species of frog in the family Ceratobatrachidae. It is endemic to northern and western Borneo. Its common name is Balu eastern frog or dwarf mountain frog. It was placed in the family Dicroglossidae before being transferred to Ceratobatrachidae in 2015.

== Description ==
Alcalus baluensis are small but stocky frogs. They typically measure 21–25 mm (0.83–0.98 in) in snout–vent length. Tympanic ring is visible.

== Habitat and conservation ==
Its natural habitats are lowland and mid-elevation primary rainforests. It occurs on the forest floor in leaf litter and along stream banks. It is threatened by habitat loss.
