= Nanorana polunini =

Conservation status
- Least Concern (IUCN 3.1)

Scientific classification
- Kingdom: Animalia
- Phylum: Chordata
- Class: Amphibia
- Order: Anura
- Family: Dicroglossidae
- Genus: Nanorana
- Species: N. polunini

Binomial name
- Nanorana polunini (Smith, 1951)

Synonyms
- Paa polunini (Smith, 1951)

Species of amphibian

Nanorana polunini (common names: Langtang paa frog, Smith frog, Polunin's paa frog, Polunin's spiny frog) is a species of frog in the family Dicroglossidae. It is found in Nyalam County in southern Tibet (China), Nepal, and possibly Kashmir (India). It is a common species in Nepal but rare in China. It lives in stream habitats in montane forest.

Nanorana polunini are medium-sized frogs, attaining a snout–vent length of about 51 mm (2.0 in).
