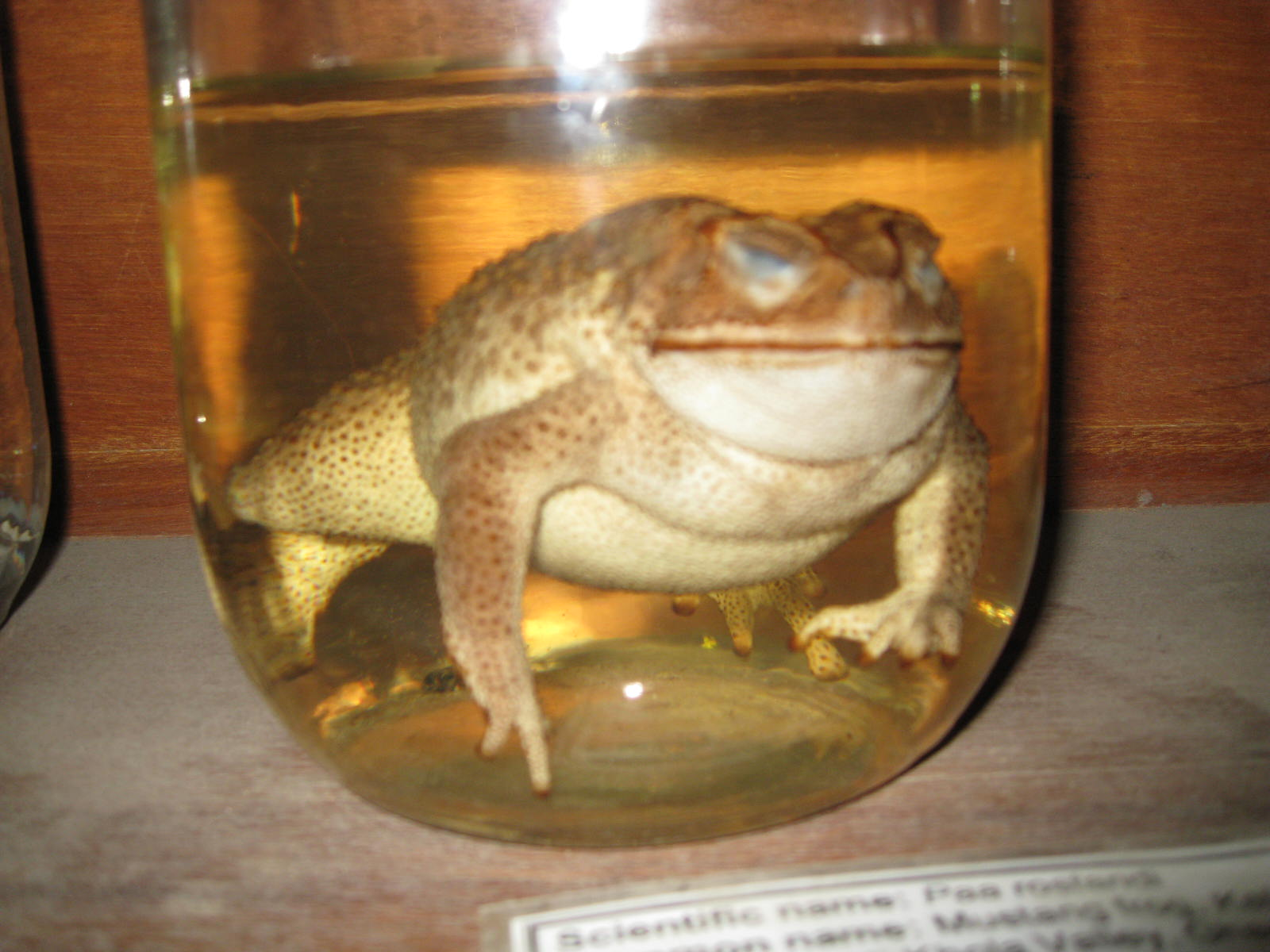

Conservation status
- Vulnerable (IUCN 3.1)

Scientific classification
- Kingdom: Animalia
- Phylum: Chordata
- Class: Amphibia
- Order: Anura
- Family: Dicroglossidae
- Genus: Nanorana
- Species: N. rostandi

Binomial name
- Nanorana rostandi (Dubois, 1974)

Synonyms
- Rana rostandi Dubois, 1974; Paa rostandi (Dubois, 1974)

= Nanorana rostandi =

Species of amphibian

Nanorana rostandi (common names: Dubois' paa frog, Rostand's paa frog, Dubois' frog) is a species of frog in the family Dicroglossidae. It is endemic to western Nepal. It is a rare species found near high-altitude streams, springs, and other running waters within forests and grasslands. It is threatened by habitat loss due to subsistence wood collecting.
