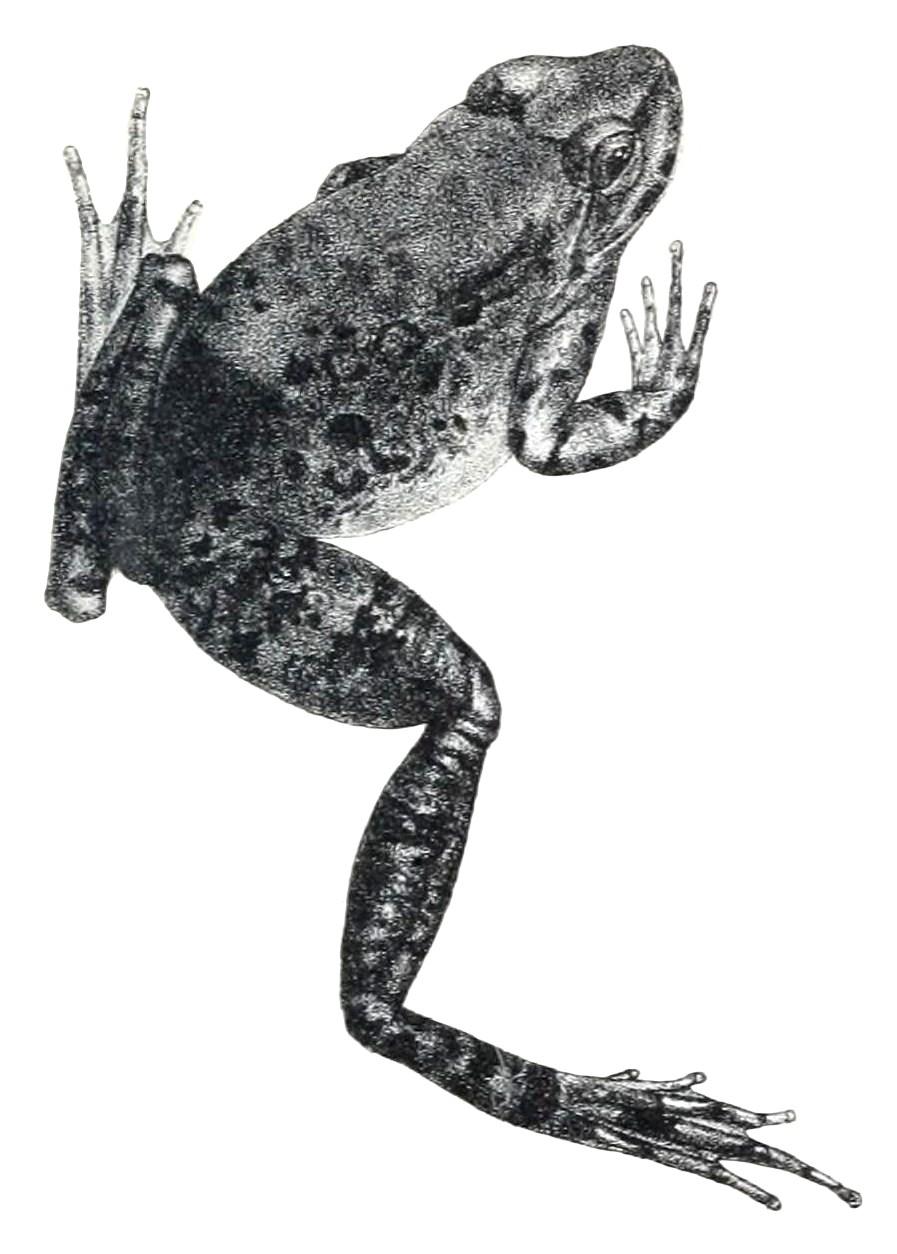

Conservation status
- Least Concern (IUCN 3.1)

Scientific classification
- Kingdom: Animalia
- Phylum: Chordata
- Class: Amphibia
- Order: Anura
- Family: Dicroglossidae
- Genus: Nanorana
- Species: N. blanfordii

Binomial name
- Nanorana blanfordii (Boulenger, 1882)

Synonyms
- Rana blandfordii Boulenger, 1882; Paa blanfordii (Boulenger, 1882); Chaparana blanfordii (Boulenger, 1882); Rana yadongensis Wu, 1977; Paa yadongensis (Wu, 1977)

= Nanorana blanfordii =

Species of amphibian

Nanorana blanfordii (common names: Blanford's frog, Blanford's paa frog, Blanford's spiny frog, Blanford's hill frog) is a species of frog in the family Dicroglossidae. It is found in northeastern India, southern Tibet (China), and eastern Nepal, and likely in the adjacent western Bhutan. The specific name blanfordii honours William Thomas Blandford, a British geologist and zoologist.

== Description ==
Nanorana blanfordii are medium-sized frogs, though relatively small among their closest relatives: adult males measure 39–47 mm (1.5–1.9 in) and adult females 39–56 mm (1.5–2.2 in) in snout–vent length. The snout is rounded. The tympanum is not very distinct. The finger and toe tips bears discs; the toes are webbed. The dorsum is grey-brown and has some black markings with white margins. There are two black triangular marks between the eyes. The underparts are white.

The tadpoles are up to 52 mm (2.0 in) in length.

== Habitat and conservation ==
Nanorana blanfordii occurs in small streams and the surrounding grassland and temperate forest at elevations of 2,600–3,400 m (8,500–11,200 ft) above sea level. Breeding takes place in streams, and the eggs are laid in water under stones.

Nanorana blanfordii is rare in China, whereas its population size is unknown elsewhere. Threats to it are unknown. It occurs in the Yadong National Nature Reserve in Tibet.
