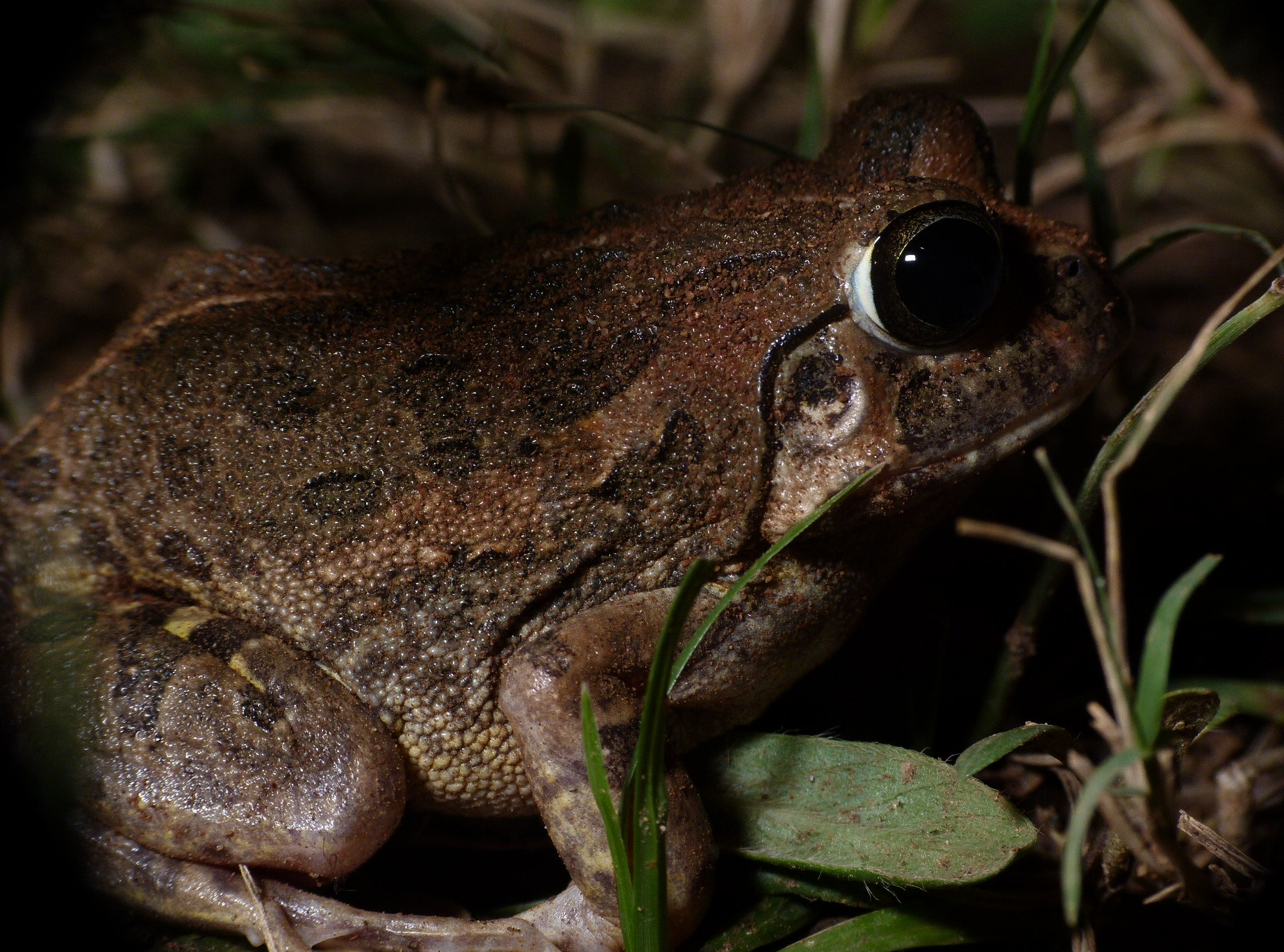

Conservation status
- Least Concern (IUCN 3.1)

Scientific classification
- Kingdom: Animalia
- Phylum: Chordata
- Class: Amphibia
- Order: Anura
- Family: Dicroglossidae
- Genus: Sphaerotheca
- Species: S. breviceps

Binomial name
- Sphaerotheca breviceps (Schneider, 1799)

Synonyms
- Rana breviceps Schneider 1799; Systoma breviceps Tschudi, 1838; Pyxicephalus breviceps Günther, 1864; Rana (Tomopterna) breviceps Boulenger, 1920; Tomopterna breviceps Deckert, 1938; Rana swani Myers and Leviton, 1956; Tomopterna swani Dubois, 1976; Sphaerotheca swani Vences, Glaw, Kosuch, Das, and Veith, 2000; Sphaerotheca magadha Prasad, Dinesh, Das, Swamy, Shinde, and Vishnu, 2019

= Indian burrowing frog =

Species of amphibian

The Indian burrowing frog (Sphaerotheca breviceps) is a species of frog found in South Asia (Bangladesh, Pakistan, Nepal, India, Sri Lanka and in Myanmar).

== Description ==
Its vomerine teeth form two oblique groups extending a little beyond the hind edge of the choanae. Its habit is stout. The head is short, with a rounded snout; the occiput is swollen, and the interorbital space is narrower than the upper eyelid. The tympanum is distinct, about two-thirds the diameter of the eye. The fingers are moderate and obtuse, with the first extending much beyond second, nearly as long as third; the toes are moderate, obtuse, and half-webbed; the subarticular tubercles are moderate, with the inner metatarsal tubercle being very large, sharp-edged, shovel-shaped, and longer than the inner toe; no outer tubercle or tarsal fold is present. The hind limbs are short, and the tibiotarsal articulation reaches the axilla or the tympanum. The skin above is smooth or granulate, with some scattered tubercles or short, interrupted longitudinal folds; a strong fold runs from the eye to the shoulder; the belly and lower surfaces of thighs are granulate. In color, it is light brown or olive above, with darker spots or marblings, often a light vertebral band, and sometimes another on the upper side of each flank; the throats of males are blackish, and those of females are usually brown-spotted. The male has two well-developed internal subgular vocal sacs.

From snout to vent, it averages 2.5 inches.

It is found in the drier regions of India from the Punjab and Sind to southern India and Sri Lanka. In the Himalayas, it occurs up to about 7000 feet. The structure of the hind limbs enables this frog to burrow in the ground for about 1.5 feet.

== Young ==
The tadpoles develop in ponds and offshoot pools near streams. They are pink-brown in color with dark brown spots. The tadpoles are 34 to 36 mm long, including the tail. The ventral area is gray-white with brown dots.

== Habitat ==
The habitat ranges from dry, arid land to moist, deciduous forest. The microhabitat in which this frog is found includes leaf litter or under rocks, in crevices or in open spaces in arid areas.

== Threats ==
The IUCN classifies this frog as least concern of extinction. It is often hit by cars. Urbanization, pesticides, and fertilizers can kill this frog.
