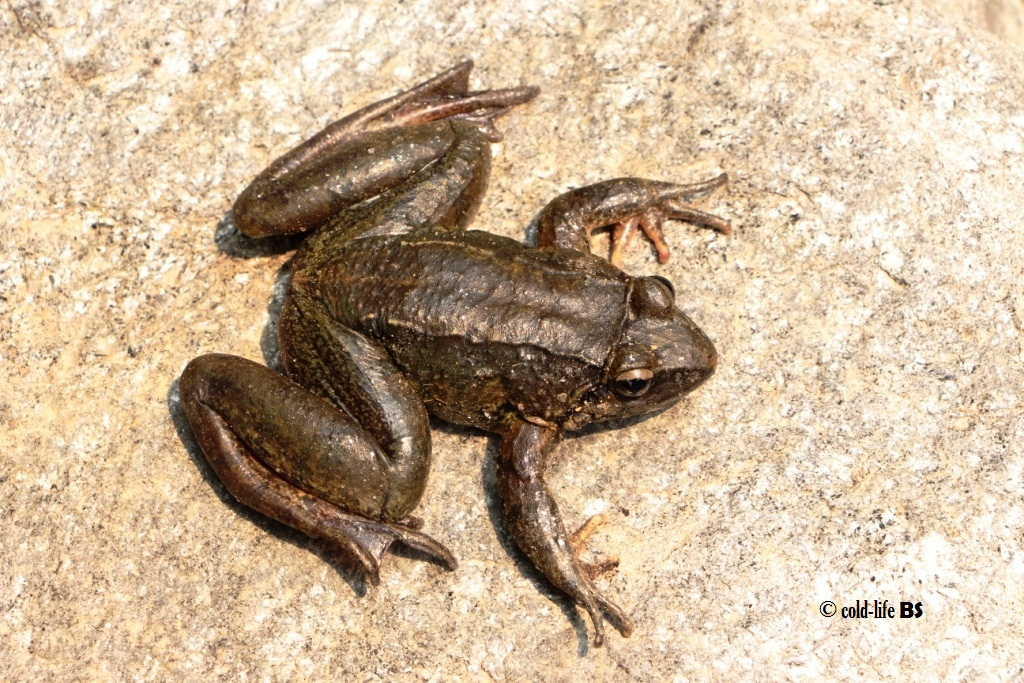
- Ombrana sikimensis from Manaslu Conservation Area, Nepal

Conservation status
- Least Concern (IUCN 3.1)

Scientific classification
- Kingdom: Animalia
- Phylum: Chordata
- Class: Amphibia
- Order: Anura
- Family: Dicroglossidae
- Genus: Ombrana; Dubois, 1992
- Species: O. sikimensis

Binomial name
- Ombrana sikimensis (Jerdon, 1870)

Synonyms
- Chaparana sikimensis (Jerdon, 1870); Rana assamensis Sclater, 1892

= Ombrana =

Genus of amphibians

Ombrana is a monotypic genus of frogs in the family Dicroglossidae. It is represented by a single species, Ombrana sikimensis. The validity of this genus is currently considered uncertain.

Ombrana sikimensis is found in central and eastern Nepal and in parts of northeastern India (Sikkim, West Bengal, and Meghalaya). It may also occur in Bhutan. It has been recorded at elevations between 1,000 and 2,000 m (3,300 and 6,600 ft) above sea level. Ombrana sikimensis typically prefer hiding in clusters underneath rocks in shallow streams.
