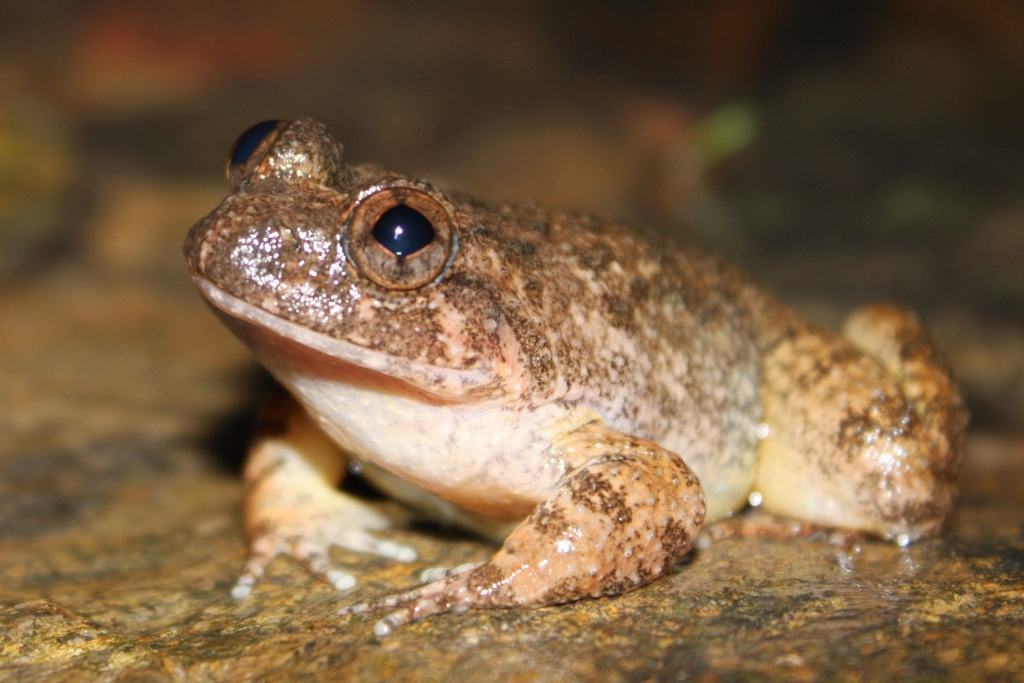
- Quasipaa exilispinosa

Scientific classification
- Kingdom: Animalia
- Phylum: Chordata
- Class: Amphibia
- Order: Anura
- Superfamily: Ranoidea
- Family: Dicroglossidae; Anderson, 1871

Subfamilies
- Dicroglossinae; Occidozyginae

= Dicroglossidae =

Family of fork-tongued frogs

The frog family Dicroglossidae occurs in tropical and subtropical regions of Asia and Africa, with most genera and species being found in Asia. The common name of the family is fork-tongued frogs.

The Dicroglossidae were previously considered to be a subfamily in the family Ranidae, but their position as a family is now well established.

== Subfamilies and genera ==
The two subfamilies contain 231 species in 13–15 genera, depending on the source.

Dicroglossinae Anderson, 1871 — 211 species in 13 genera:

- Allopaa Ohler and Dubois, 2006 (one species)
- Chrysopaa Ohler and Dubois, 2006 (one species)
- Euphlyctis Fitzinger, 1843 (eight species)
- Fejervarya Bolkay, 1915 (14 species)
- Hoplobatrachus Peters, 1863 (six species)
- Limnonectes Fitzinger, 1843 (91 species)
- Minervarya Dubois, Ohler, and Biju, 2001 (31 species)
- Nannophrys Günther, 1869 (four species)
- Nanorana Günther, 1896 (32 species)
- Ombrana Dubois, 1992 (one species)
- Phrynoderma Fitzinger, 1843 (5 species)
- Quasipaa Dubois, 1992 (13 species)
- Sphaerotheca Günther, 1859 (nine species)

Occidozyginae Fei, Ye, and Huang, 1990 — 20 species in two genera:

- Ingerana Dubois, 1987 (two species)
- Occidozyga Kuhl and Van Hasselt, 1822 (18 species)

== Phylogeny ==
The following phylogeny of Dicroglossidae is from Pyron & Wiens (2011) with the split of Euphlyctis sensu lato based on Yadav et al. (2024). Dicroglossidae is a sister group of Ranixalidae.

- Dicroglossidae
  - Occidozyginae
    - Ingerana
    - Occidozyga
  - Dicroglossinae
    - - Nanorana
      - Limnonectes
    - - - Nannophrys
        - - - Euphlyctis
            - Phrynoderma
          - Hoplobatrachus
      - - Sphaerotheca
        - - Fejervarya
          - Minervarya
