= Puddle frog =

Puddle frog may refer to:

- Phrynobatrachus, a genus of Sub-Saharan frogs that form the monogeneric family Phrynobatrachidae
- Occidozyga, a genus of southeast Asia frogs
  - Common puddle frog (Occidozyga laevis), a frog found in the Philippines
  - Green puddle frog (Occidozyga lima), a frog found in Bangladesh, Cambodia, China, Hong Kong, India, Indonesia, Laos, Malaysia, Myanmar, Thailand, Vietnam, and possibly Nepal
  - Sulawesian puddle frog (Occidozyga celebensis), a frog endemic to Indonesia
  - Sumatran puddle frog (Occidozyga sumatrana), a frog endemic to Indonesia
