= Common frog (disambiguation) =

The common frog (Rana temporaria), also known as the European common frog and European common brown frog, is a semi-aquatic frog of the family Ranidae found throughout much of Europe including the British Isles.

Common frog may also refer to:

- Common green frog (Hylarana erythraea), a frog in the family Ranidae found in Brunei, Cambodia, Indonesia, Laos, Malaysia, Myanmar, Singapore, Thailand, and Vietnam
- Common mist frog (Litoria rheocola), a frog in the family Ranidae native to northeastern Queensland, Australia
- Common parsley frog (Pelodytes punctatus), a frog in the family Pelodytidae found France, Spain, Portugal and a small part of Northwestern Italy (Piemont and Liguria)
- Common puddle frog (Occidozyga laevis), a frog in the family Dicroglossidae endemic to the Philippines
- Common reed frog (Hyperolius viridiflavus), a frog in the family Hyperoliidae found in Burundi, the Democratic Republic of the Congo, Ethiopia, Kenya, Rwanda, Sudan, Tanzania, and Uganda, and possibly the Central African Republic, Chad and Eritrea
- Common rocket frog (Colostethus panamansis), a frog in the family Dendrobatidae found in northwestern Colombia and Panama
- Common sand frog (Tomopterna cryptotis), a frog in the family Pyxicephalidae found in Sub-Saharan Africa

== See also ==
- Common rain frog (disambiguation)
- Common tree frog (disambiguation)
