= Yellow frog (disambiguation) =

The yellow frog is a species of frog in the family Ranidae found in Cambodia, Laos, Myanmar, Thailand, and Vietnam.

Yellow frog may also refer to:

- Bahia yellow frog, a frog endemic to Brazil
- Venezuelan yellow frog, a frog endemic to Venezuela
- Yellow bromeliad frog, a frog endemic to Jamaica

== See also ==
- Yellow bush frog (disambiguation)
- Yellow tree frog (disambiguation)
- Yellow-legged frog (disambiguation)
- Yellow-throated frog
