= Bromeliad frog (disambiguation) =

The bromeliad frog (Crossodactylodes) is a genus of frog in the family Leptodactylidae from the Atlantic Forest biome of eastern Brazil.

Bromeliad frog may also refer to:

- Bromeliad tree frog (Bromeliohyla bromeliacia), a frog in the family Hylidae found in Belize, Guatemala, Honduras, and southern Mexico
- Greater bromeliad tree frog (Bromeliohyla dendroscarta), a frog in the family Hylidae endemic to central Veracruz and northern Oaxaca, Mexico
- Green bromeliad frog (Osteopilus wilderi), a frog in the family Hylidae endemic to Jamaica
- Half-stripe bromeliad frog (Eleutherodactylus heminota), a frog in the family Eleutherodactylidae found in the Dominican Republic and Haiti
- Khaki bromeliad frog (Eleutherodactylus fowleri), a frog in the family Eleutherodactylidae found in the Dominican Republic and Haiti
- Yellow bromeliad frog (Osteopilus marianae), a frog in the family Hylidae endemic to central Jamaica
