= Giant tree frog (disambiguation) =

The giant tree frog (Litoria infrafrenata), a frog in the family Hylidae and world's largest tree frog, is native to the rainforests of Northern Queensland, New Guinea, the Bismarck Islands, and the Admiralty Islands.

Giant tree frog may also refer to:

- Giant treefrog (Rhacophorus maximus), a frog in the family Rhacophoridae found in southwestern China (Yunnan, Tibet), northeastern India, Nepal, western Thailand, and northern Vietnam, and possibly in Bangladesh
- Hispaniolan giant tree frog (Osteopilus vastus), a frog in the family Hylidae found in the Dominican Republic and Haiti
