= Common tree frog (disambiguation) =

The common tree frog (Polypedates leucomystax) is a species in the shrub frog family, Rhacophoridae.

Common tree frog may also refer to:

- Common big-eyed tree frog (Nyctimystes narinosus), a frog in the family Hylidae endemic to Papua New Guinea
- Common Chinese tree frog (Hyla chinensis), a frog in the family Hylidae found in southeastern and eastern China and Taiwan
- Common forest tree frog (Leptopelis notatus), a frog in the family Hyperoliidae found in Angola, Cameroon, the Republic of the Congo, the Democratic Republic of the Congo, Equatorial Guinea, Gabon, Nigeria, and possibly the Central African Republic
- Common Indian tree frog (Polypedates maculatus), a frog in the family Rhacophoridae found in South Asia
- Common Mexican tree frog (Smilisca baudinii), a frog in the family Hylidae whose native range extends from the Sonoran Desert and the Lower Rio Grande Valley of Texas south to Costa Rica
- Hispaniolan common tree frog (Osteopilus dominicensis), a frog in the family Hylidae endemic to the Dominican Republic and Haiti
