= Tubercled frog =

Tubercled frog may refer to:

- Tubercled flood frog, a frog found in Thailand and possibly Laos
- Tubercled pygmy frog, a frog found in India, Myanmar, China, Taiwan, Thailand, Cambodia, Laos, Vietnam, Malaysia, and Singapore
