= Small-headed frog =

Conservation status
- Near Threatened (IUCN 3.1)

Scientific classification
- Kingdom: Animalia
- Phylum: Chordata
- Class: Amphibia
- Order: Anura
- Family: Dicroglossidae
- Genus: Occidozyga
- Species: O. diminutiva

Binomial name
- Occidozyga diminutiva (Taylor, 1922)

Synonyms
- Micrixalus diminutiva Taylor, 1922

Species of amphibian

The small-headed frog or tiny oriental frog (Occidozyga diminutiva) is a species of frog in the family Dicroglossidae. It is endemic to the Philippines where it is found on Mindanao (including Mount Malindang), Basilan, and in the Sulu Archipelago.

== Description ==
Occidozyga diminutiva is a small stocky frog, not exceeding 30 mm (1.2 in) in body length. Skin of back and head is smooth or faintly shagreened. Tympanum is completely hidden or with only anterior rim visible. Toes are incompletely webbed and nostrils are lateral (these characters can be used to distinguish it from Occidozyga laevis with completely webbed toes and superior nostrils). Males have a nuptial pad in their hands and paired subgular vocal sacs; with mean snout–vent length of 19 mm (0.75 in), they also appear to be smaller than females.

== Habitat ==
Its habitats are streams and quiet pools of water in undisturbed and disturbed lowland forests. This common frog is declining; it is threatened by habitat loss (loss of lowland rainforests and the pollution of mountain streams and rivers).
