= Coorg frog =

Coorg frog may refer to:

- Coorg night frog (Nyctibatrachus sanctipalustris), a frog in the family Nyctibatrachidae endemic to the Western Ghats, India
- Coorg yellow bush frog (Raorchestes luteolus), a frog in the family Rhacophoridae endemic to the Western Ghats, India
