= Yellow tree frog (disambiguation) =

The yellow tree frog is a species of frog in the family Rhacophoridae endemic to the southern Western Ghats, India.

Yellow tree frog may also refer to:

- Hispaniolan yellow tree frog, a frog found in the Dominican Republic and Haiti
- Oaxacan yellow tree frog, a frog endemic to Mexico

== See also ==
- Yellow-spotted tree frog
