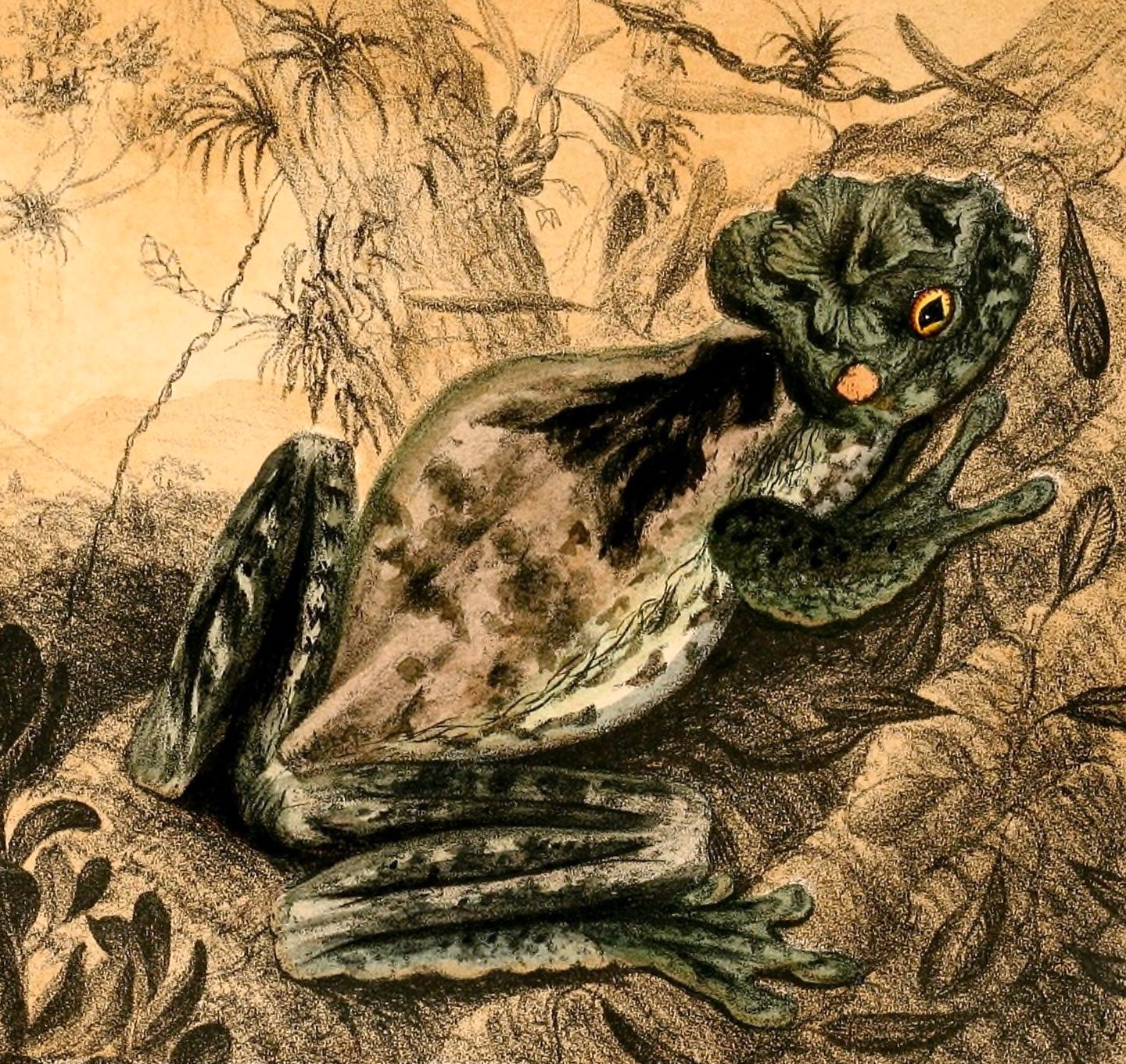

Conservation status
- Vulnerable (IUCN 3.1)

Scientific classification
- Kingdom: Animalia
- Phylum: Chordata
- Class: Amphibia
- Order: Anura
- Family: Hylidae
- Genus: Osteopilus
- Species: O. crucialis

Binomial name
- Osteopilus crucialis (Harlan, 1826)

Synonyms
- Hyla crucialis Harlan, 1826

= Jamaican snoring frog =

Species of amphibian

The Jamaican snoring frog (Osteopilus crucialis), or Harlan's Antilles frog, is a species of frog in the family Hylidae endemic to central Jamaica. Its natural habitats are mesic broadleaf woods and forests with large dead trees. It can be found on tree trunks and in bromeliads; males call from hollows in branches and bromeliads. Eggs are laid in bromeliads. It is threatened by habitat loss.
