= Occidozyga vittata =

Conservation status
- Least Concern (IUCN 3.1)

Scientific classification
- Kingdom: Animalia
- Phylum: Chordata
- Class: Amphibia
- Order: Anura
- Family: Dicroglossidae
- Genus: Occidozyga
- Species: O. vittata

Binomial name
- Occidozyga vittata (Andersson, 1942)

Synonyms
- Oxyglossus laevis var. vittata Andersson, 1942; Occidozyga vittatus (Andersson, 1942); Phrynoglossus vittatus (Andersson, 1942)

Species of amphibian

Occidozyga vittata is a species of frog in the family Dicroglossidae. It is endemic to southern and central Vietnam, where it was recorded in Đà Lạt, Lâm Đồng Province and Thừa Thiên-Huế Province.
