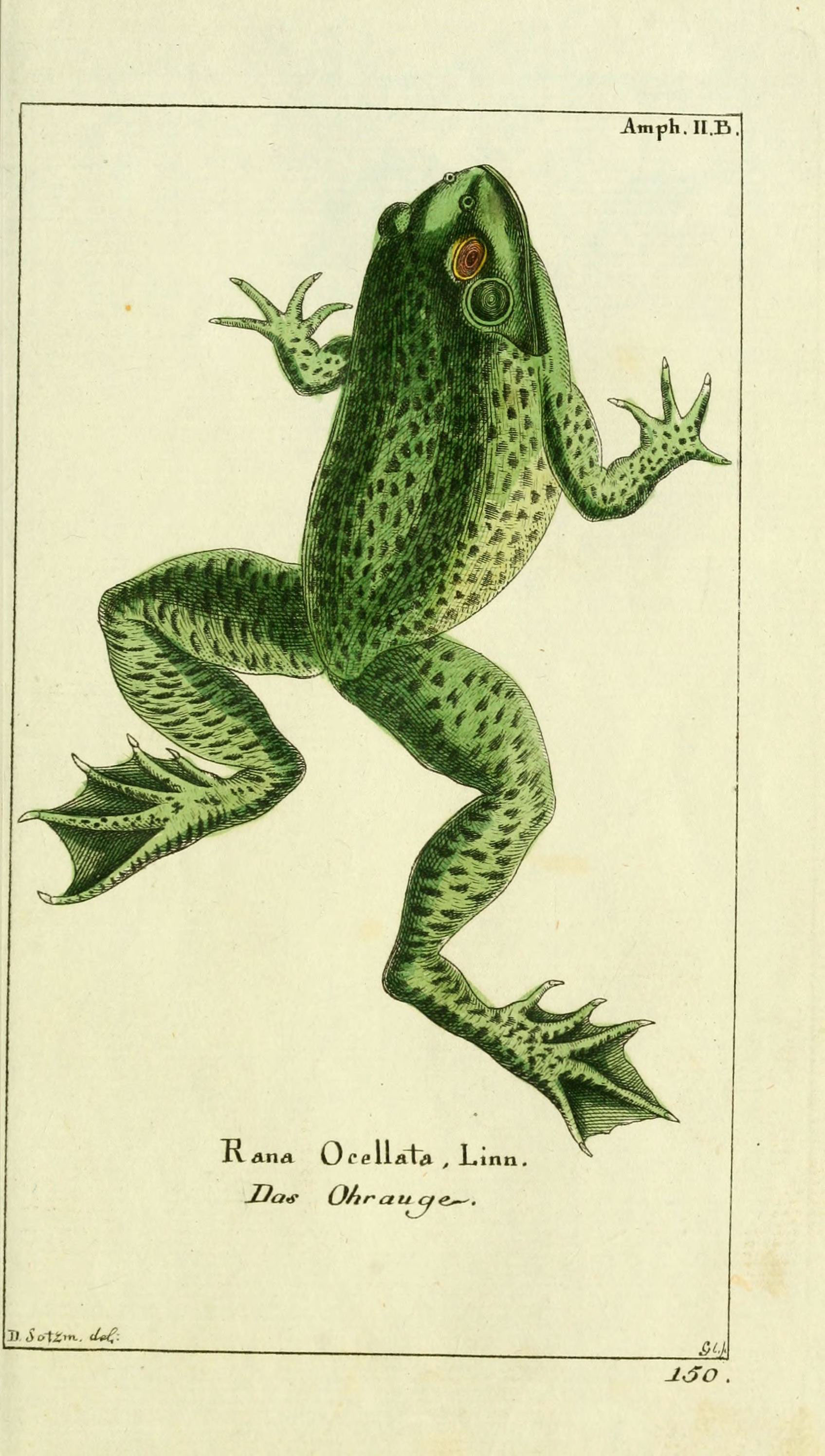
- Illustration

Conservation status
- Near Threatened (IUCN 3.1)

Scientific classification
- Kingdom: Animalia
- Phylum: Chordata
- Class: Amphibia
- Order: Anura
- Family: Hylidae
- Genus: Osteopilus
- Species: O. ocellatus

Binomial name
- Osteopilus ocellatus (Linnaeus, 1758)

Synonyms
- Hyla brunnea; Osteopilus brunneus; Rana ocellata; Trachycephalus scutigerus

= Jamaican laughing frog =

Species of amphibian

The Jamaican laughing frog (Osteopilus ocellatus) is a species of frog in the family Hylidae. It is endemic to Jamaica. Other common names include Savanna-la-Mar treefrog.

This is a common species in most parts of Jamaica, where it occurs in a variety of habitat types, including developed but rural areas.

It is associated with bromeliads as it sometimes lays its eggs inside these plants and the tadpoles develop there. It does this in regions of Jamaica where the porous limestone substrate prevents reliable above-ground water storage. On other parts of the island the frog will brood in streams or pools of water.

Taxonomic studies determined that the binomial names Rana ocellata and Osteopilus brunneus belong to this species as synonyms, and distinguished this taxon from the mainly South American species Leptodactylus latrans.
