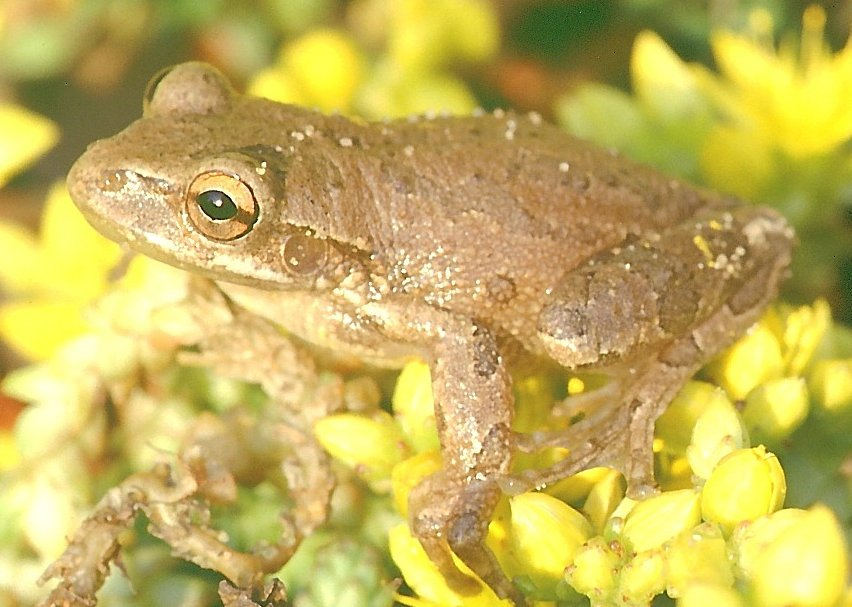
- Osteopilus septentrionalis

Scientific classification
- Domain: Eukaryota
- Kingdom: Animalia
- Phylum: Chordata
- Class: Amphibia
- Order: Anura
- Family: Hylidae
- Subfamily: Lophyohylinae
- Genus: Osteopilus; Fitzinger, 1843

Species
- 8 sp., see text

= Osteopilus =

Genus of amphibians

Osteopilus is a genus of frogs in the family Hylidae. These species have a bony co-ossification on the skull resulting in a casque, hence its name ‘bone-cap’, from osteo- (‘bone’) and the Greek pilos (πῖλος, ‘felt cap’). Color varies between uniform brown, brown-gray, or olive with darker markings or marbled with greens, grays or brown, making a distinct pattern. The finger disks are round; the fingers with a reduced webbing; eyes and tympanum are large. Their natural range includes the Greater Antilles (except Puerto Rico) and the Bahamas, but O. septentrionalis has also been introduced to the Lesser Antilles, Hawaii and Florida, USA.

== Species ==
Eight species are recognized in this genus:

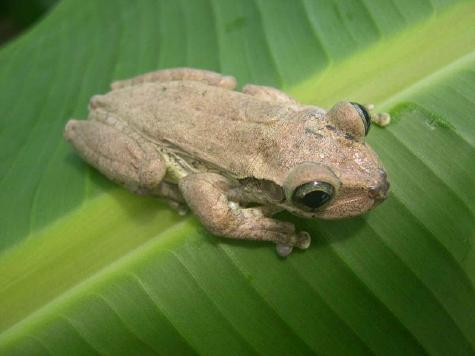
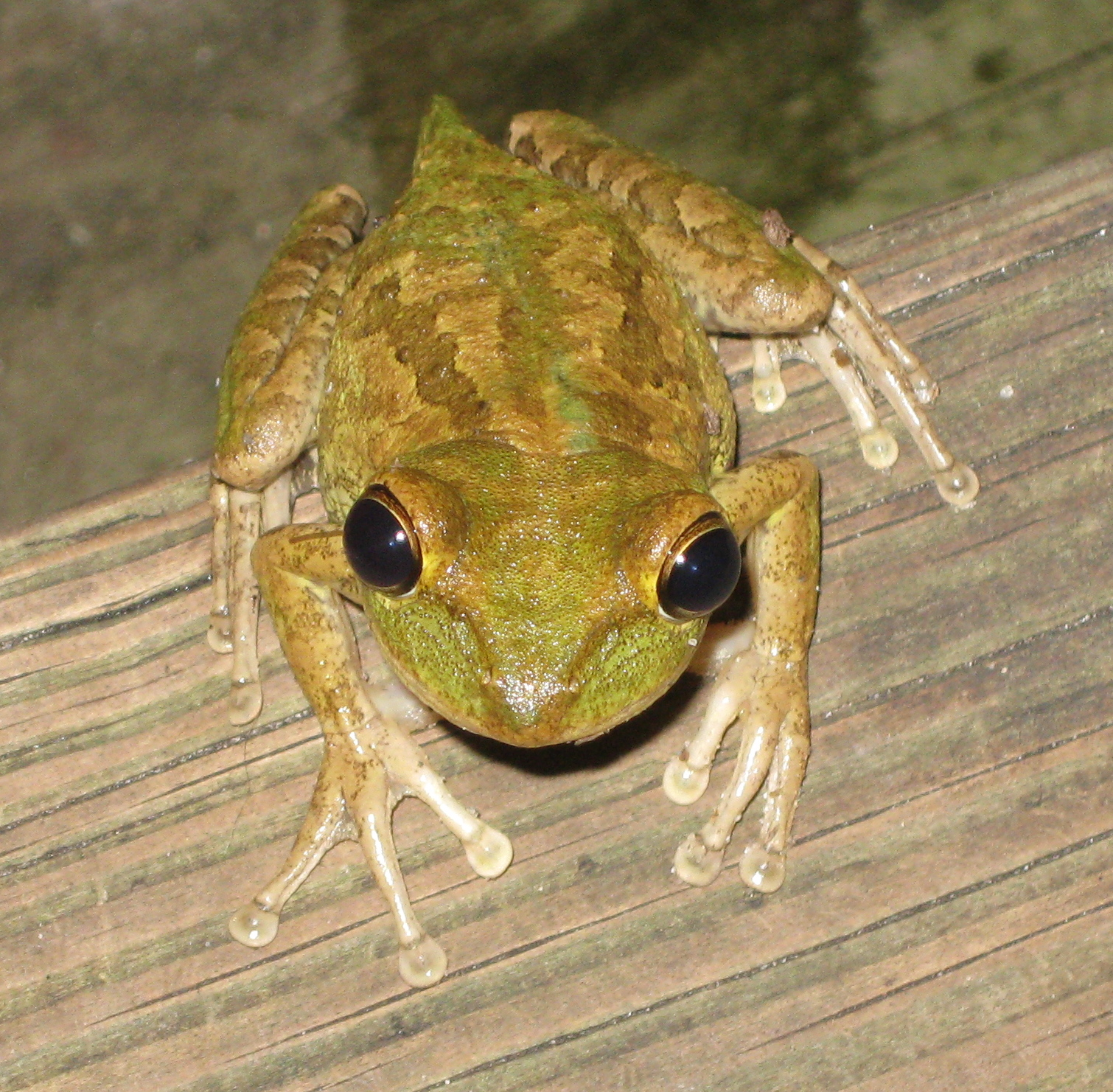
Image	Binomial name and author	Common name
	O. crucialis (Harlan, 1826)	Jamaican snoring frog or Harlan's Antilles frog
	O. dominicensis (Tschudi, 1838)	Hispaniolan common tree frog or Dominican tree frog
	O. marianae (Dunn, 1926)	yellow bromeliad frog or Spaldings tree frog
	O. ocellatus (Linnaeus, 1758)	Jamaican laughing frog, or Savanna-la-Mar tree frog, Brown tree frog
	O. pulchrilineatus (Cope, 1870)	Hispaniolan yellow tree frog
	O. septentrionalis (Duméril and Bibron, 1841)	Cuban tree frog
	O. vastus (Cope, 1871)	Hispaniolan giant tree frog
	O. wilderi (Dunn, 1925)	green bromeliad frog or Wilder's tree frog
