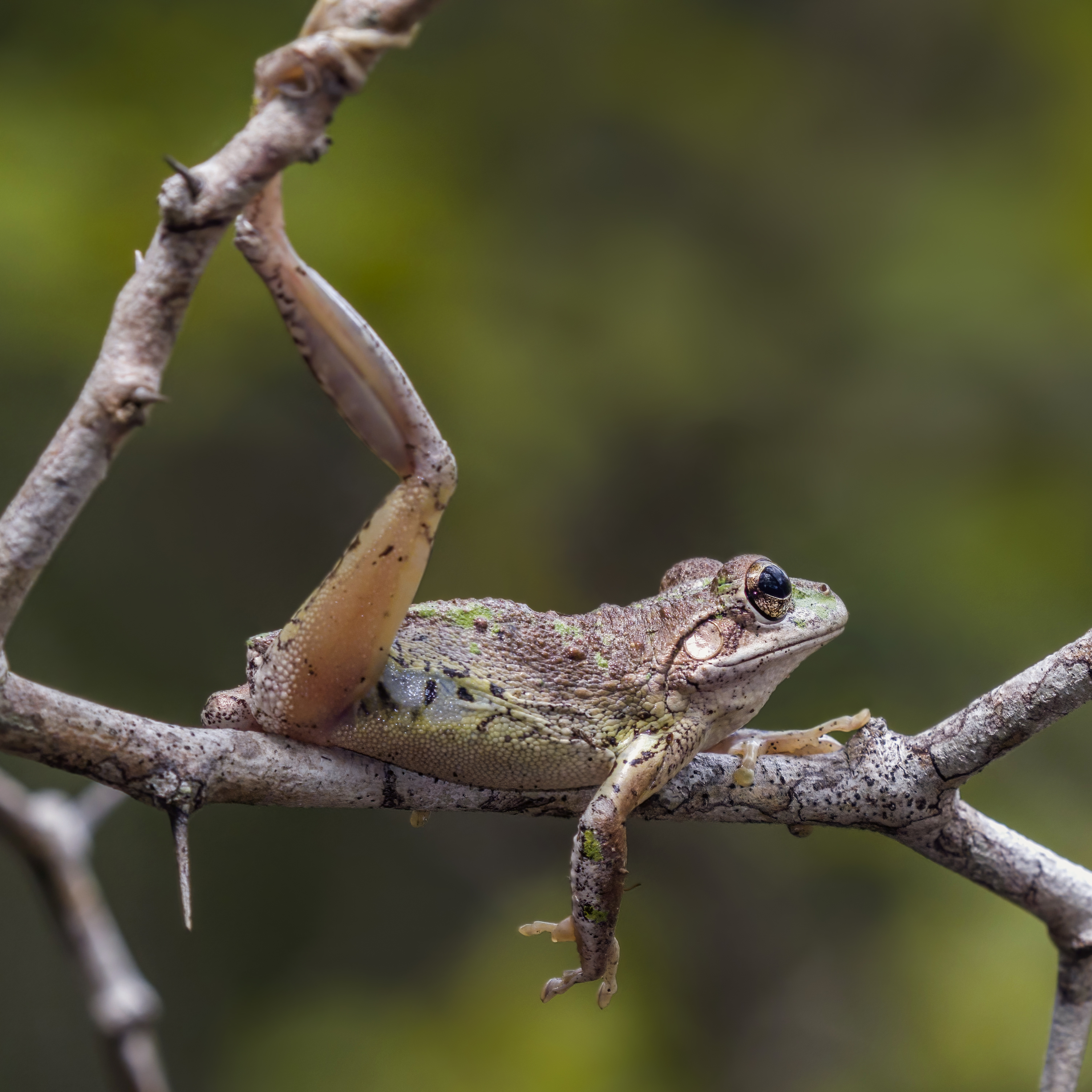
- On Grand Cayman

Conservation status
- Least Concern (IUCN 3.1)

Scientific classification
- Kingdom: Animalia
- Phylum: Chordata
- Class: Amphibia
- Order: Anura
- Family: Hylidae
- Genus: Osteopilus
- Species: O. septentrionalis

Binomial name
- Osteopilus septentrionalis (A.M.C. Duméril & Bibron, 1841)

Synonyms
- Hyla septentrionalis A.M.C. Duméril & Bibron, 1841; Osteopilus septentrionalis — Trueb & Tyler, 1974

= Cuban tree frog =

Species of amphibian

The Cuban tree frog (Osteopilus septentrionalis) is a large species of tree frog that is native to Cuba, the Bahamas, and the Cayman Islands; but has become invasive in several other places around the Americas. Its wide diet and ability to thrive in urban areas has made it a highly invasive species with established colonies in places such as Florida, the Hawaiian island of Oahu, and the Caribbean Islands. These tree frogs can vary in size from 2 to 5.5 inches (5 to 12.7 cm) in length. Due to their large size, Cuban tree frogs can eat a wide variety of things, particularly native tree frogs, and their removal has shown to result in an increase in the amount of native tree frogs in an area. The tadpoles of Cuban tree frogs also heavily compete with native frog tadpoles, which can cause negative effects in body mass, size at metamorphosis, and growth rates for the native tadpoles.

== Description ==
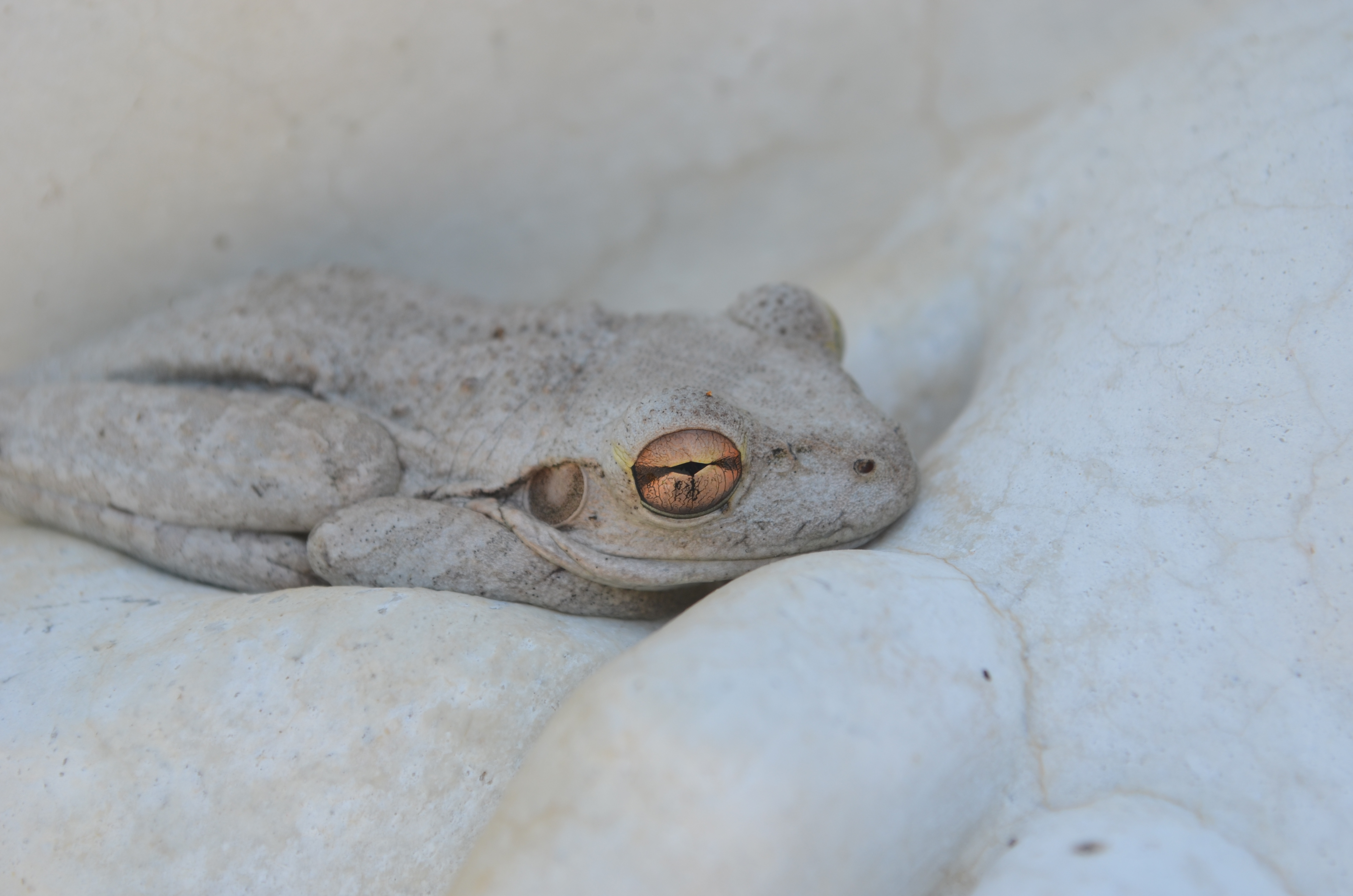
In Florida

Cuban tree frogs are the largest tree frogs in North America, ranging from 2 to 5.5 inches or (5 to 12.7 cm) in length. Cuban tree frogs are mostly gray, brown, or green, with young frogs having more green coloration than adults. These frogs have rough, warty skin with blotchy or mottled patterning. Cuban tree frogs have the ability to change their color and pattern to camouflage themselves. The inner thighs of these frogs are bright yellow, which helps to confuse a predator when the frog jumps and reveals the color. The toes have sticky pads that are useful in their arboreal life.

The skin on their heads is fused to the skull; if the head of an adult frog is rubbed (between the eyes), the skin does not move. This special adaptation prevents water loss, since fewer blood vessels occur in the "co-ossified" (fused) area. Cuban tree frogs are able to secrete a toxic mucus from their skin which can cause a fiery sensation if it makes contact with a person's eyes.

== Behavior ==
Cuban tree frogs are mainly nocturnal and sleep during the day, preferring to hunt and breed when the sun goes down. Being very voracious, this tree frog will eat almost anything large enough to fit in its mouth, including smaller frogs. Their foraging will occasionally take them up utility poles, where they can cause short-circuits of utility switches, causing costly power outages. Cuban tree frogs will sometimes sleep on palm trees or in potted plants, which can aid in their spread.

== Life cycle ==
As with most frogs, female Cuban tree frogs are larger than males. During the breeding season, the male will have a black nuptial pad on his hand or wrist that helps him hold onto the female during amplexus.

Cuban tree frogs breed year round depending on the conditions, preferring to breed during the wetter months. Optimal conditions are considered to be 81.5 °F (27.5 °C) with high humidity (97.8%) and rain. A female can lay several hundred eggs to over a thousand in a single clutch. Eggs can hatch in under 30 hours and tadpoles can fully develop in one month. They have wide caudal fins and two rows of labial teeth on the top of their mouths and four rows on the bottom. Tadpoles survive on algae and will occasionally eat other tadpoles, and on rare occasions, recently metamorphosed juveniles. After metamorphosis, froglets are between 0.55 and 0.67 inches (14 and 17 mm) long.

Cuban tree frogs are prey for rat snakes, eastern garter snakes, ribbon snakes, black racers, American crows, Cuban knight anoles, and humans. American crows prey on juveniles and tadpoles at breeding sites.

== Distribution ==
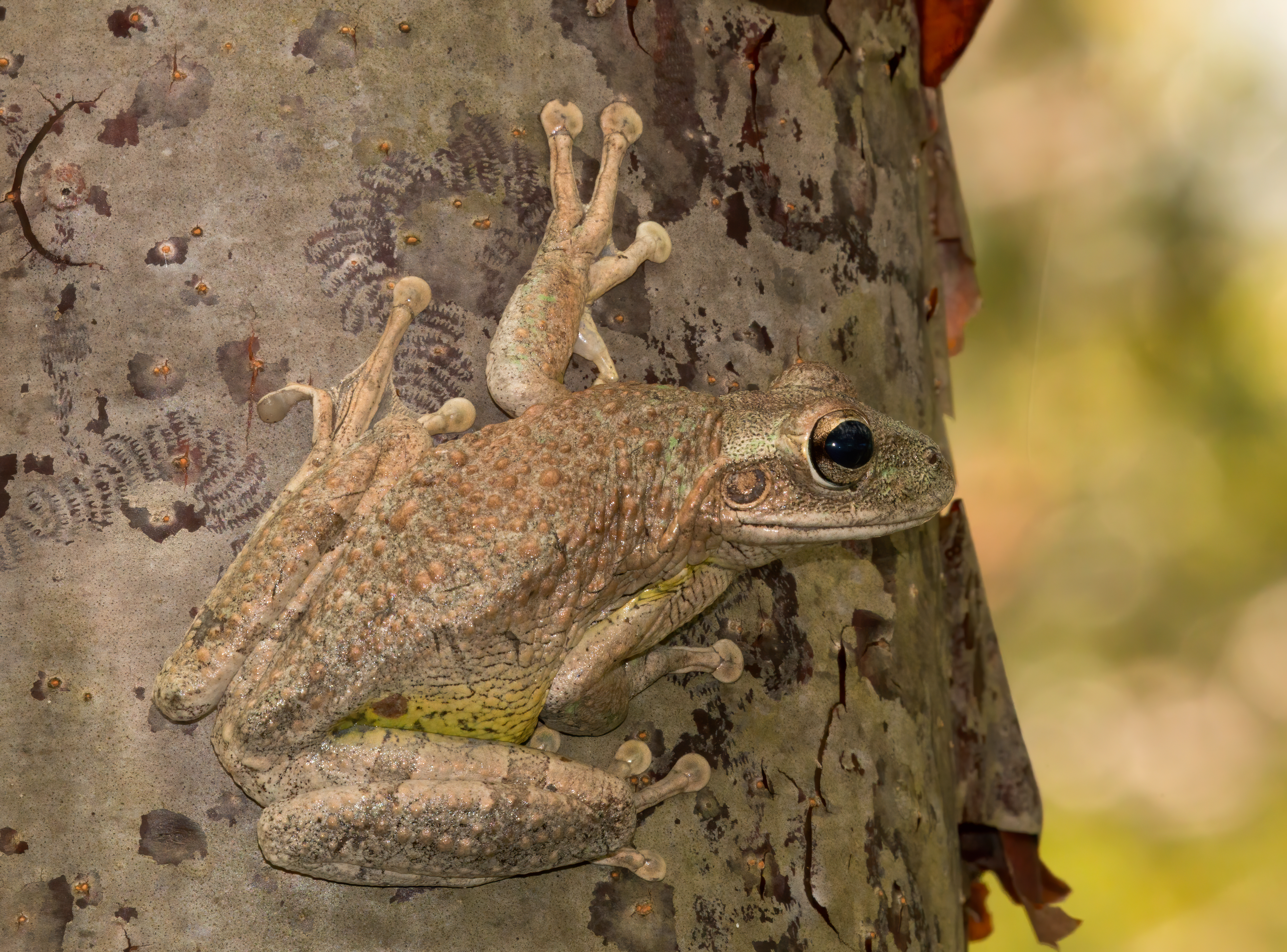
On Grand Cayman

The Cuban tree frog is native to Cuba, the Bahamas, and the Cayman Islands. This large frog has been introduced in Puerto Rico, the US Virgin Islands, and the British Virgin Islands. Whether the species was native to the Key West region of Florida is debated, or if it was introduced to the area. First discovered in the 1930s, these frogs arrived via cargo ships in the 1800s. They can survive in brackish water, which may have helped the species to spread to various islands. The Cuban tree frogs' progressive colonization into the mainland of Florida is believed to be abetted by use of State Road A1A construction during the 1940s. The species is now established in southern Florida and parts of the panhandle region, and can be found as far north as South Carolina.

The Cuban tree frog is known to hitchhike on shipments of potted plants, vegetation, packaging, boats, and other motorized vehicles. Once in a new location, the frogs become an invasive species. In Puerto Rico, they have become a predator of the common coquí (Eleutherodactylus coqui). They have several good colonizing traits, such as high fecundity, short generation time, a diverse diet, good competitive ability, and the ability to coexist with humans. In addition, they also secrete a toxic mucus from their skin which helps to limit the number of natural predators.

Cuban tree frogs are known to inhabit a variety of habitats, including estuaries, low-density suburban development, small towns, agricultural areas, particularly ones with exotic plants, and lowland forests and swamps. Within their habitats, they can be found in damp, shady areas, particularly around shrubs and trees, by cisterns, rain barrels, and buildings. They like to be near medium and large sized trees and prefer conditions where the temperature remains above 10 degrees Celsius.

== Conservation ==
This large frog directly impacts native ecosystems by eating native frogs, lizards, and snakes, and poses a threat to the biodiversity of the areas into which it spreads by causing native tree frog populations to decline. These effects are most noticeable in urban and suburban areas, where native tree frogs, such as the American green tree frog (Hyla cinerea) and the squirrel treefrog (Hyla squirella) are rapidly disappearing. It has spread throughout peninsular Florida, and is also commonly found in isolated populations as far north as southern Georgia. It is inadvertently carried on vehicles or ornamental plants, spreading to new areas, and has been transported as far north and west as Saskatchewan, Canada. Because of its effects on the biodiversity, some experts have recommended killing the animal when it is found in a new habitat. It was originally believed that anesthetizing the frogs with Orejel before freezing them was the most humane method of euthanasia, but the American Veterinary Medical Association only considers this a humane method to use on amphibians weighing under 4g, and is only rarely acceptable in amphibians larger than that; while Cuban tree frogs are significantly larger, (often weighing as much as 50g) Thusly, euthanasia with alcohol free benzocaine (20%) products spread liberally on the ventral area of the frog alone is considered preferable to anesthetizing and freezing invasives, though other methods may be considered more ideal.

== In captivity ==
Cuban tree frogs are commonly available in the pet trade within the United States. They are inexpensive, and when cared for properly tend to live from five to ten years. They feed readily on any animal they can fit in their mouths, which can result in cannibalistic behavior if frogs housed together have a significant size difference. Their toxic mucus can burn the eyes and trigger an allergic (or asthmatic) reaction; as a result, this species is not an ideal pet species, especially for children.

The Cuban tree frog's colonization of Oahu is believed to be a result of accidental or deliberate release of pets. Therefore, the species is now banned from sale in Hawaii. Conviction of importation of a Cuban tree frog carries a maximum fine of $25,000 and a year in jail.
