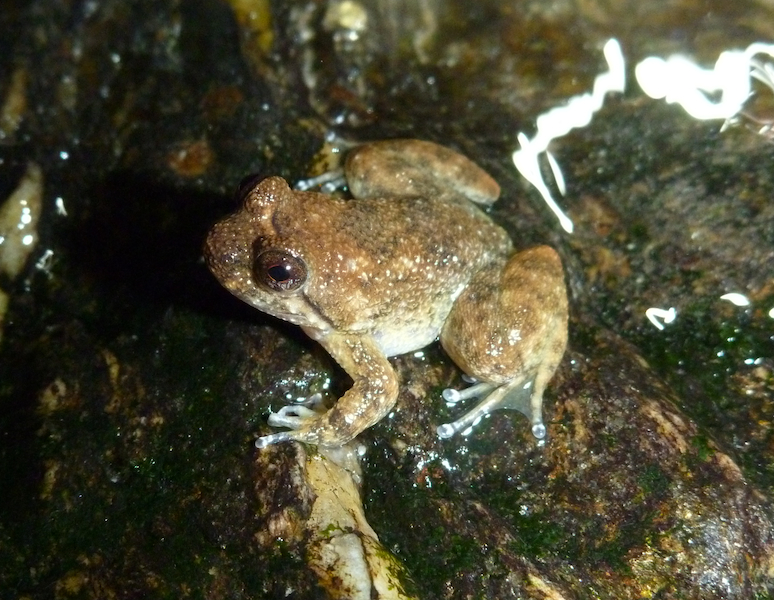

Conservation status
- Least Concern (IUCN 3.1)

Scientific classification
- Kingdom: Animalia
- Phylum: Chordata
- Class: Amphibia
- Order: Anura
- Family: Dicroglossidae
- Genus: Occidozyga
- Species: O. semipalmata

Binomial name
- Occidozyga semipalmata Smith, 1927

Synonyms
- Ooeidozyga semipalmata Smith, 1927; Occidozyga semipalmatus Smith, 1927

= Occidozyga semipalmata =

Species of frog

Occidozyga semipalmata is a species of frog in the family Dicroglossidae. It is endemic to western and northern Sulawesi, Indonesia. It has been found in Gunung Lombobatang Natural Reserve, Lore Lindu National Park, and Bogani Nani Wartabone National Park.

== Description ==
Based on 51 specimens, adult Occidozyga tompotika measure between 22.8 and 40.9 mm (0.90 and 1.61 in) in snout–vent length. Tadpoles are not known. Occidozyga tompotika was formerly confused with it, before being described in 2011.

== Habitat and ecology ==
Its natural habitats are stony, highland streams in closed-canopy forest. It is threatened by habitat loss.
