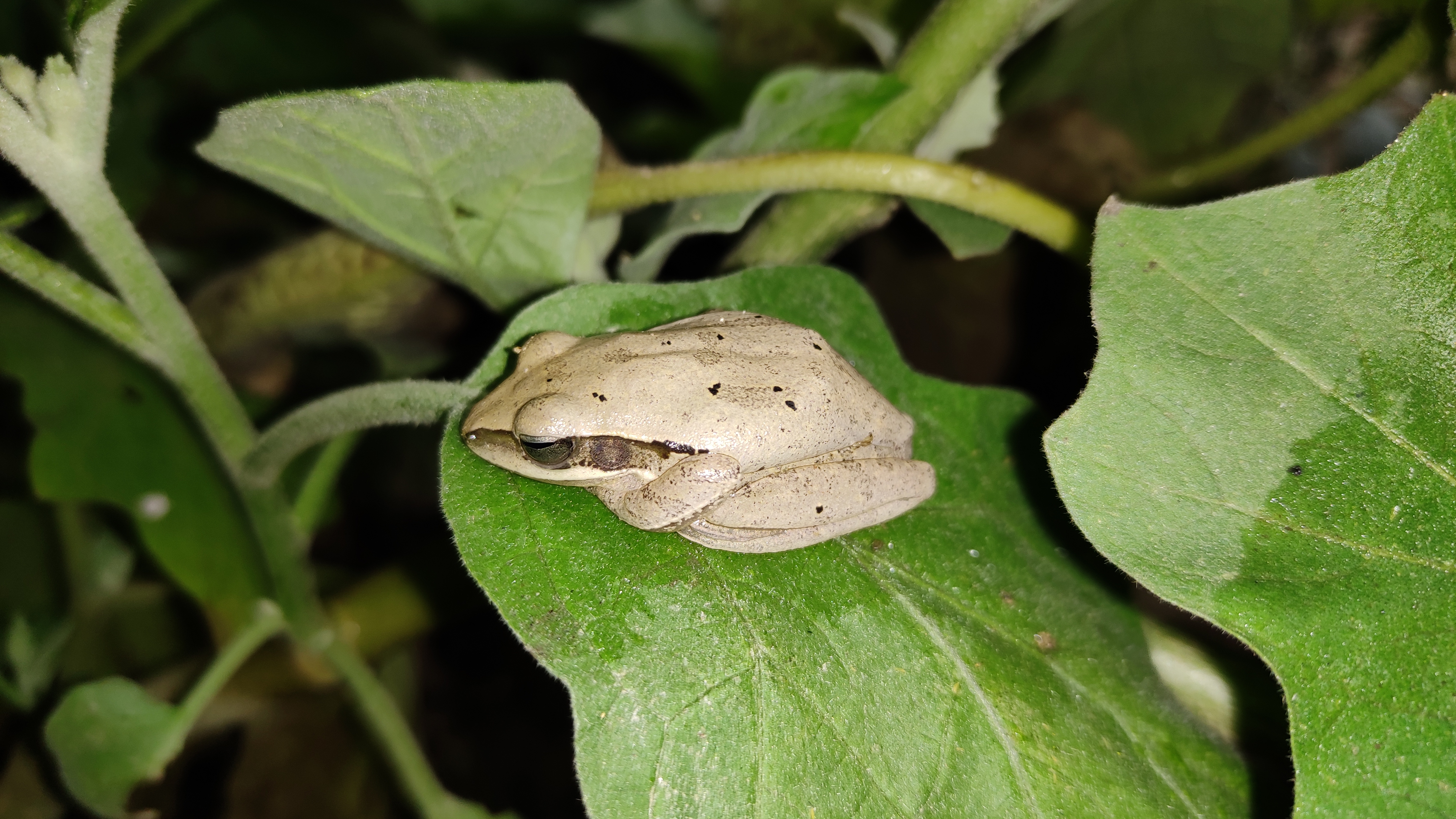
- In Lucknow, Uttar Pradesh, India

Conservation status
- Least Concern (IUCN 3.1)

Scientific classification
- Kingdom: Animalia
- Phylum: Chordata
- Class: Amphibia
- Order: Anura
- Family: Rhacophoridae
- Genus: Polypedates
- Species: P. himalayensis

Binomial name
- Polypedates himalayensis (Annandale, 1912)

Synonyms
- Rhacophorus maculatus himalayensis Annandale, 1912; Rhacophorus (Rhacophorus) leucomystax himalayensis Ahl, 1931; Rhacophorus (Rhacophorus) macrotis Ahl, 1931; Rhacophorus (Rhacophorus) maculatus himalayensis Dubois, 1987; Polypedates himalayensis Gogoi and Sengupta, 2017

= Polypedates himalayensis =

Species of amphibian

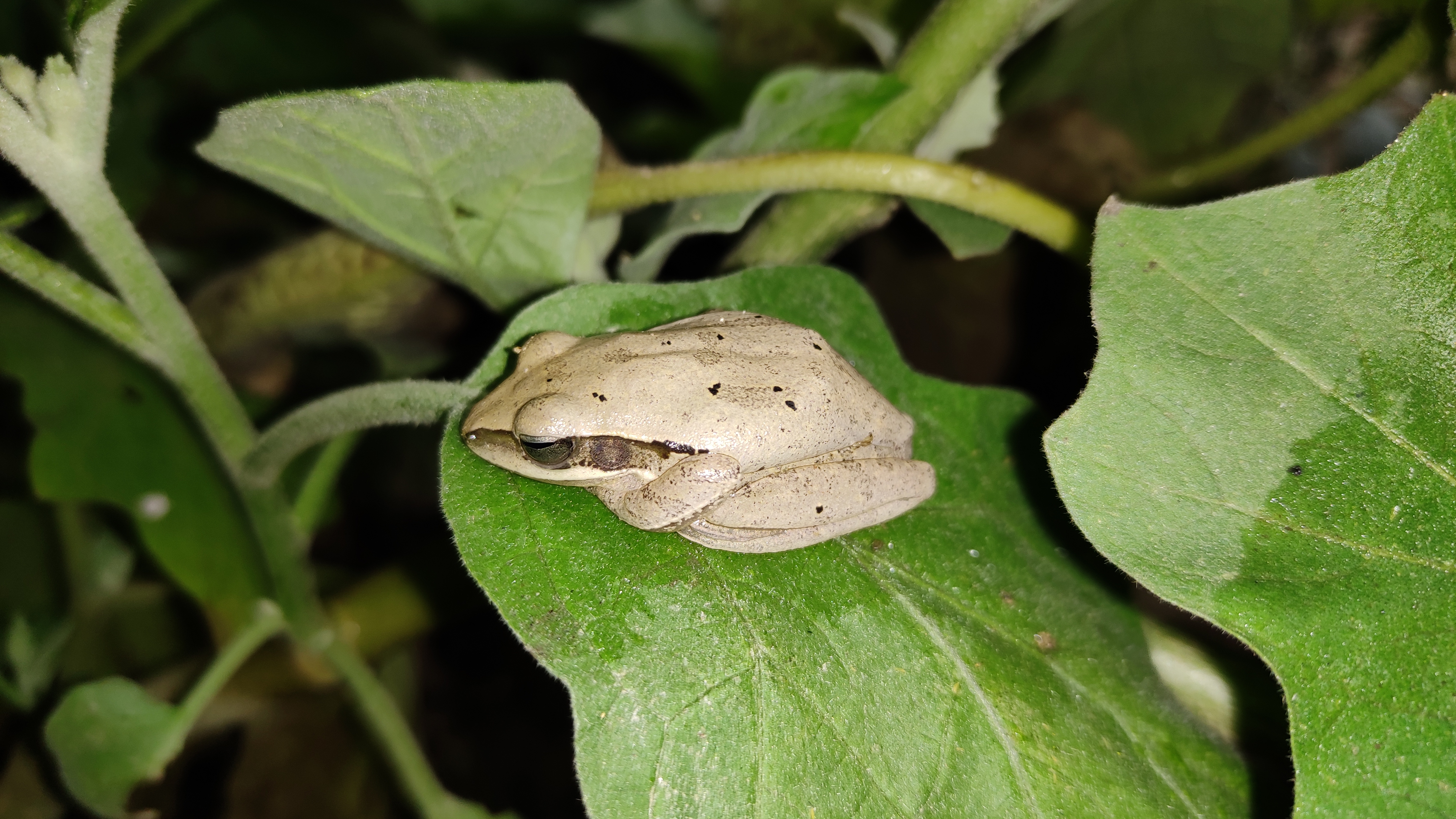
Himalayan Tree Frog (Polypedates Himalayensis)

Polypedates himalayensis, the Himalayan tree frog, is a species of tree frog found in north-eastern India. It has been observed between 100 and 2000 meters above sea level.

A typical frog found in moist deciduous forest. This frog also found in semi-urban, especially in cities with extensive gardens or plants. Formerly, it was considered as a subspecies of the Indian tree frog. It is associated with freshwater habitat.

This frog was once considered conspecific with Polypedates maculatus.

Scientists believe this frog is not in danger of extinction because of its large range and tolerance to human-altered habitats.
