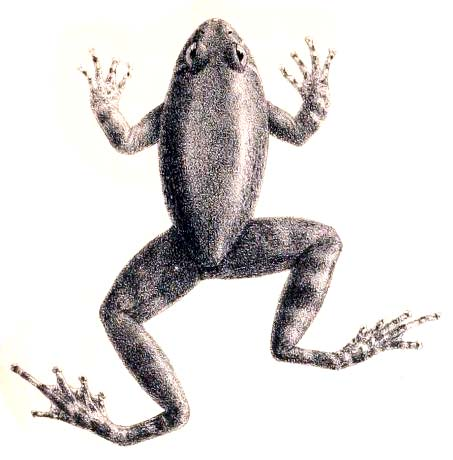

Conservation status
- Least Concern (IUCN 3.1)

Scientific classification
- Kingdom: Animalia
- Phylum: Chordata
- Class: Amphibia
- Order: Anura
- Family: Dicroglossidae
- Genus: Occidozyga
- Species: O. baluensis

Binomial name
- Occidozyga baluensis (Boulenger, 1896)

Synonyms
- Oreobatrachus baluensis Boulenger, 1896; Phrynoglossus baluensis (Boulenger, 1896)

= Seep frog =

Species of amphibian

The seep frog or Balu oriental frog (Occidozyga baluensis) is a species of frog in the family Dicroglossidae. It is probably endemic to Borneo.

== Range ==
Occidozyga baluensis is found in northwestern Borneo (Sarawak, Malaysia, Brunei, and Kalimantan, Indonesia) and was also recorded once in Lampung, Sumatra, although the latter is questionable. Its name refers to its type locality, "Mount Kina Balu, North Borneo".

== Description ==
Occidozyga baluensis are small–medium-sized frogs. Males grow to a snout–vent length of about 25 mm (0.98 in) and females to 35 mm (1.4 in). Dorsal colouration is variable, brown, grey, or olive, sometimes with dark markings. Some individuals have a vertebral stripe. The belly is cream with an abundance of brown spots. Tadpoles have a long tail with low tail fin; the tip is pointed. The mouth is terminal in position and the orifice appears quite small.

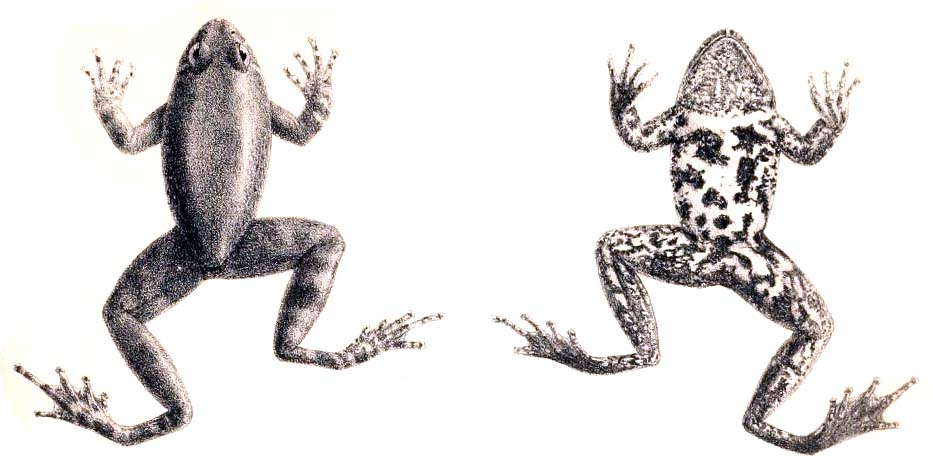
Dorsal and ventral view of Occidozyga baluensis from Boulenger's original species description.

== Habitat ==
Occidozyga baluensis inhabit shallow ponds or water-filled depressions where clear water seeps out at the base of a slope. Tadpoles live in the shallow water film that covers the leaf litter in seepage areas. They are predatory and ingest small invertebrates. The species is threatened by habitat loss caused by clear-cutting.
