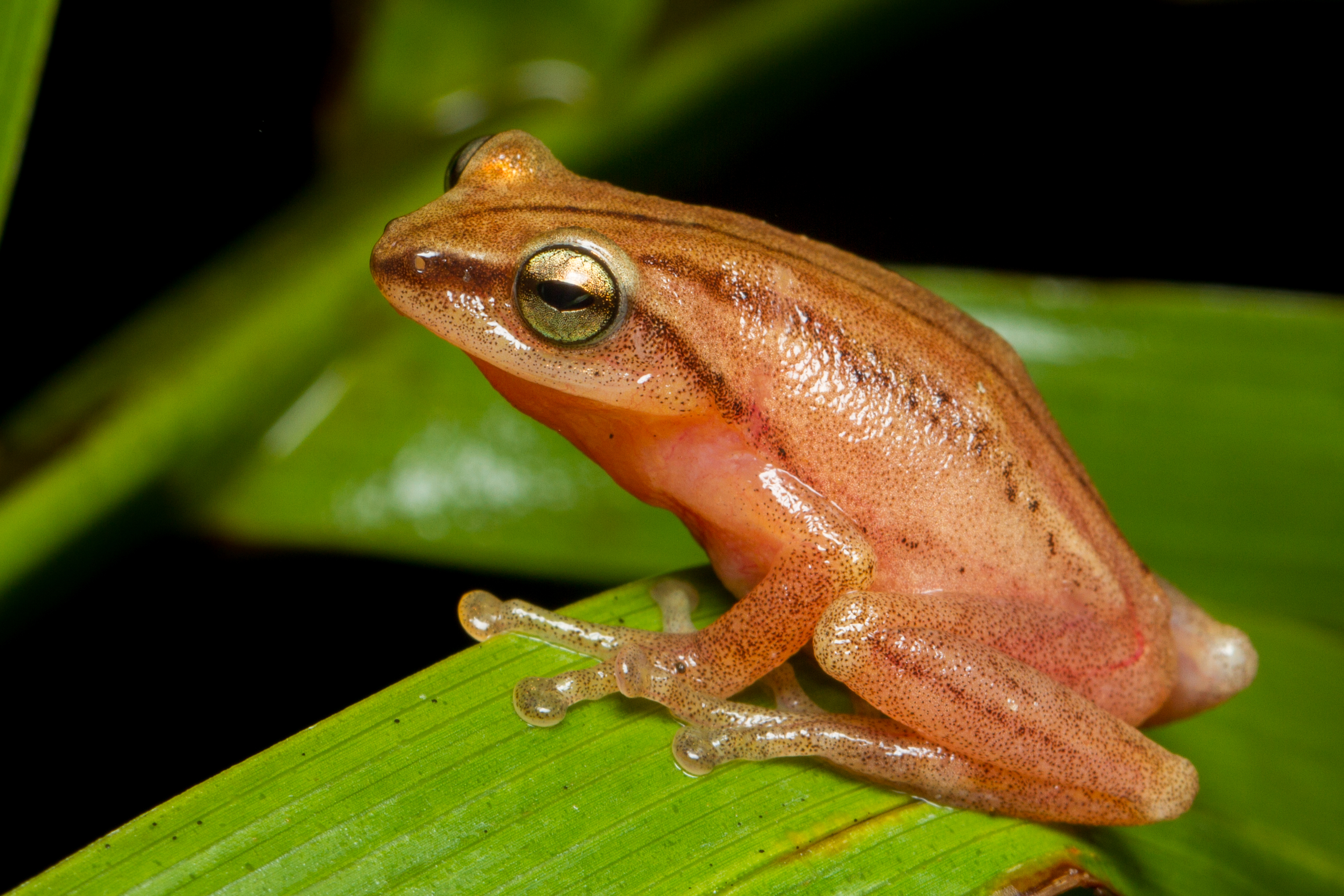

Conservation status
- Endangered (IUCN 3.1)

Scientific classification
- Kingdom: Animalia
- Phylum: Chordata
- Class: Amphibia
- Order: Anura
- Family: Rhacophoridae
- Genus: Raorchestes
- Species: R. travancoricus

Binomial name
- Raorchestes travancoricus (Boulenger, 1891)

Synonyms
- Ixalus travancoricus Boulenger, 1891; Philautus travancoricus (Boulenger, 1891); Pseudophilautus travancoricus (Boulenger, 1891)

= Raorchestes travancoricus =

Species of frog

Raorchestes travancoricus, variously known as the Travancore bushfrog, Travancore bubble-nest frog, or Travancore tree frog, is a species of frog in the family Rhacophoridae. The species is endemic to the southern Western Ghats, India. Its specific name, travancoricus, as well as its three common names, refer to its type locality, Bodinayakkanur in the former Travancore state (now in Tamil Nadu).

== Rediscovery ==
In early 2009, University of Delhi researchers announced that the species had been rediscovered in the Western Ghats. The rediscovery was a result of intense surveying in the Western Ghats. Before the discovery of a single male from Vandiperiyar in 2004, the species had not been recorded after its description in 1891 by George Albert Boulenger. More recently, two males have been found from Vagamon. The species remains very rare, and the known populations, both in Kerala, occur in disturbed habitat (tea plantations) outside protected areas.

== Description ==
R. travancoricus is a small frog, males measuring 22–25 mm (0.87–0.98 in) in snout-vent length and the single measured female 30 mm (1.2 in). Its back is light-greyish red to brown with prominent brown broad lines alternating with thin faint lines. It has a yellowish brown iris. R. travancoricus is a close relative of R. luteolus with which it could be confused.

== Habitat ==
This frog has been observed perched on shrubs near or between plantations, such as tea plantations and in some tropical evergreen forests and vayal habitats. Sometimes this frog sits on leaf litter. This frog has been observed between 350 and 1802 meters above sea level.

== Threats ==
The IUCN classifies this frog as endangered because of its small range, which is heavily fragmented and subject to ongoing degradation. Many people also take a pilgrimage to the Western Ghats. The pilgrims, the garbage they leave behind, and the burnings performed to create space for them can all disturb this frog. Scientists cite climate change as another threat: Because this species lives high in the hills, it cannot readily migrate to colder habitats. This frog's range includes a protected park, where an estimated half the population is believed to live: Periyar Tiger Reserve.

Scientists believe the fungus Batrachochytrium dendrobatidis can infect this frog. Batrachochytrium dendrobatidis causes the fungal disease chytridiomycosis.
