= Occidozyga tompotika =

Conservation status
- Critically Endangered (IUCN 3.1)

Scientific classification
- Kingdom: Animalia
- Phylum: Chordata
- Class: Amphibia
- Order: Anura
- Family: Dicroglossidae
- Genus: Occidozyga
- Species: O. tompotika

Binomial name
- Occidozyga tompotika Iskandar, Arifin, and Rachmanasah, 2011

Species of frog

Occidozyga tompotika is a species of frog in the family Dicroglossidae. It is endemic to Sulawesi, Indonesia, where it is known from the Balantak Mountains in the Central Sulawesi Province. It is named after Mount Tompotika, its type locality.

== Description ==
Based on seven specimens, adult Occidozyga tompotika measure between 28.3 and 36.5 mm (1.11 and 1.44 in) in snout–vent length. The body is robust and plump. Males are slightly smaller than females and have some secondary sexual characters including enlarged thenar tubercle at the dorsal surface of first finger and paired vocal sac, but are similar to females in body proportions. The tympanum is hidden. The dorsum is uniformly coloured dark brown or blackish. Lower parts and gular surfaces are heavily marbled with dark brown. Some specimens have a light middorsal line. The finger and toe tips are expanded; the toes are half-webbed. Tadpoles are not known.

== Habitat and ecology ==
This species has been collected between 462 and 778 m (1,516 and 2,552 ft) above sea level in very shallow creeks with continuous flow. Its more webbed toes suggest that it is more aquatic than the related Occidozyga semipalmata. Other ecological data are not reported.
