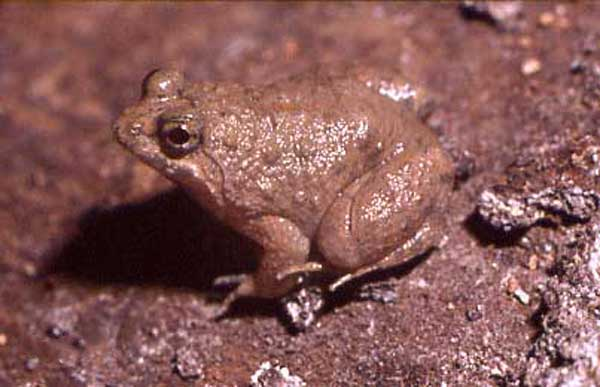

Conservation status
- Least Concern (IUCN 3.1)

Scientific classification
- Kingdom: Animalia
- Phylum: Chordata
- Class: Amphibia
- Order: Anura
- Family: Dicroglossidae
- Genus: Occidozyga
- Species: O. martensii

Binomial name
- Occidozyga martensii (Peters, 1867)

= Round-tongued floating frog =

Species of amphibian

The round-tongued floating frog (Occidozyga martensii) is a species of frog in the family Dicroglossidae. Occidozyga magnapustulosus, distributed in scattered locations of northern Thailand and Laos, might be included within it.

== Range and habitat ==
Occidozyga martensii is found throughout most of Indochina. It is found in Cambodia, southern China (Yunnan, Guangxi, Guangdong, and Hainan), Laos, northern peninsular Malaysia, Thailand, Vietnam, and possibly Myanmar.

Its natural habitats are subtropical or tropical moist lowland forest, rivers, intermittent rivers, swamps, freshwater marshes, intermittent freshwater marshes, ponds, irrigated land, and canals and ditches.
