= Occidozyga floresiana =

Conservation status
- Vulnerable (IUCN 3.1)

Scientific classification
- Kingdom: Animalia
- Phylum: Chordata
- Class: Amphibia
- Order: Anura
- Family: Dicroglossidae
- Genus: Occidozyga
- Species: O. floresiana

Binomial name
- Occidozyga floresiana Mertens, 1927

Synonyms
- Phrynoglossus floresiana (Mertens, 1927); Occidozyga floresiana (Mertens, 1927)

Species of frog

Occidozyga floresiana (common name: Flores Oriental frog) is a species of frog in the family Dicroglossidae. It is endemic to Flores, Indonesia.

Its natural habitats are tropical dry forest, swamps, freshwater marshes, intermittent freshwater marshes, and seasonally flooded agricultural land.
