= Yellow bush frog =

Yellow bush frog may refer to:

- Coorg yellow bush frog (Raorchestes luteolus), a frog in the family Rhacophoridae endemic to the Western Ghats, India, in the state of Karnataka
- Kalpatta yellow bush frog (Raorchestes nerostagona), a frog in the family Rhacophoridae endemic to the Western Ghats, India
