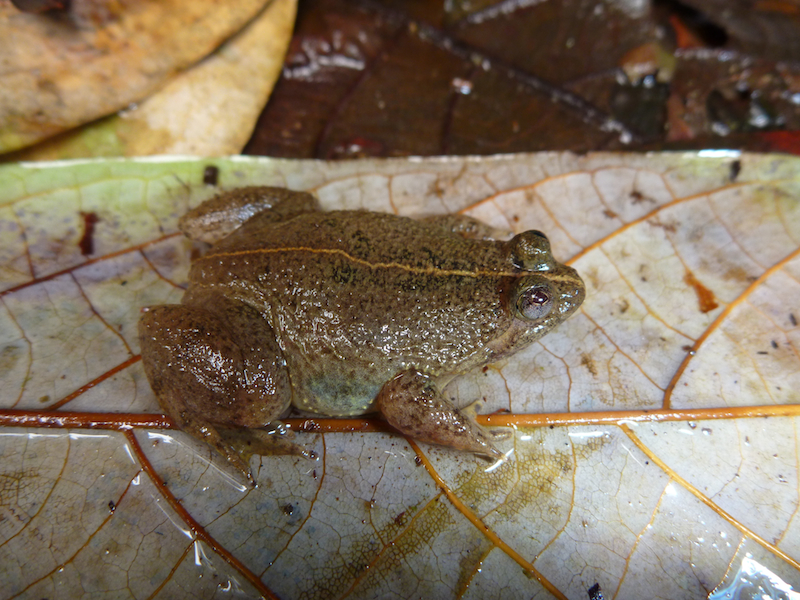

Conservation status
- Least Concern (IUCN 3.1)

Scientific classification
- Kingdom: Animalia
- Phylum: Chordata
- Class: Amphibia
- Order: Anura
- Family: Dicroglossidae
- Genus: Occidozyga
- Species: O. celebensis

Binomial name
- Occidozyga celebensis Smith, 1927

Synonyms
- Ooeidozyga celebensis Smith, 1927

= Sulawesian puddle frog =

Species of amphibian

The Sulawesian puddle frog or Celebes Oriental frog (Occidozyga celebensis) is a species of frog in the family Dicroglossidae. It is endemic to Sulawesi, Indonesia.

This abundant species lives in paddy fields and other disturbed habitats. It breeds in paddy fields and slow-moving streams. As a widespread, abundant and adaptable species, it is not threatened.
