= Yellow-spotted tree frog =

Yellow-spotted tree frog is a common name for several frogs and may refer to:

- Leptopelis flavomaculatus, native to eastern and southern Africa
- Ranoidea castanea, native to southeastern Australia
- Boana curupi, native to South America
