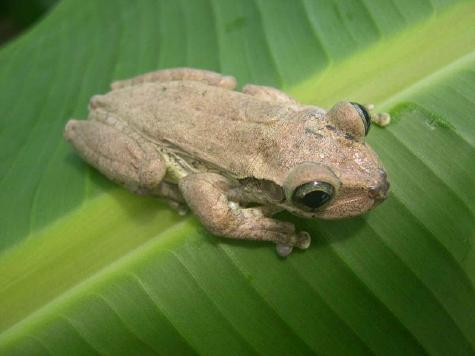

Conservation status
- Least Concern (IUCN 3.1)

Scientific classification
- Kingdom: Animalia
- Phylum: Chordata
- Class: Amphibia
- Order: Anura
- Family: Hylidae
- Genus: Osteopilus
- Species: O. dominicensis

Binomial name
- Osteopilus dominicensis (Tschudi, 1838)

= Hispaniolan common tree frog =

Species of amphibian

The Hispaniolan common tree frog, Hispaniolan laughing tree frog (Osteopilus dominicensis), or Dominican tree frog, is a species of frog in the family Hylidae endemic to the island of Hispaniola (both the Dominican Republic and Haiti).

== Habitat ==
It is an abundant, ubiquitous species on Hispaniola, found from sea level up to 2,000 m (6,600 ft) asl. It occurs anywhere near water in forests and anthropogenic open areas. It breeds in standing bodies water, both temporary and permanent.
