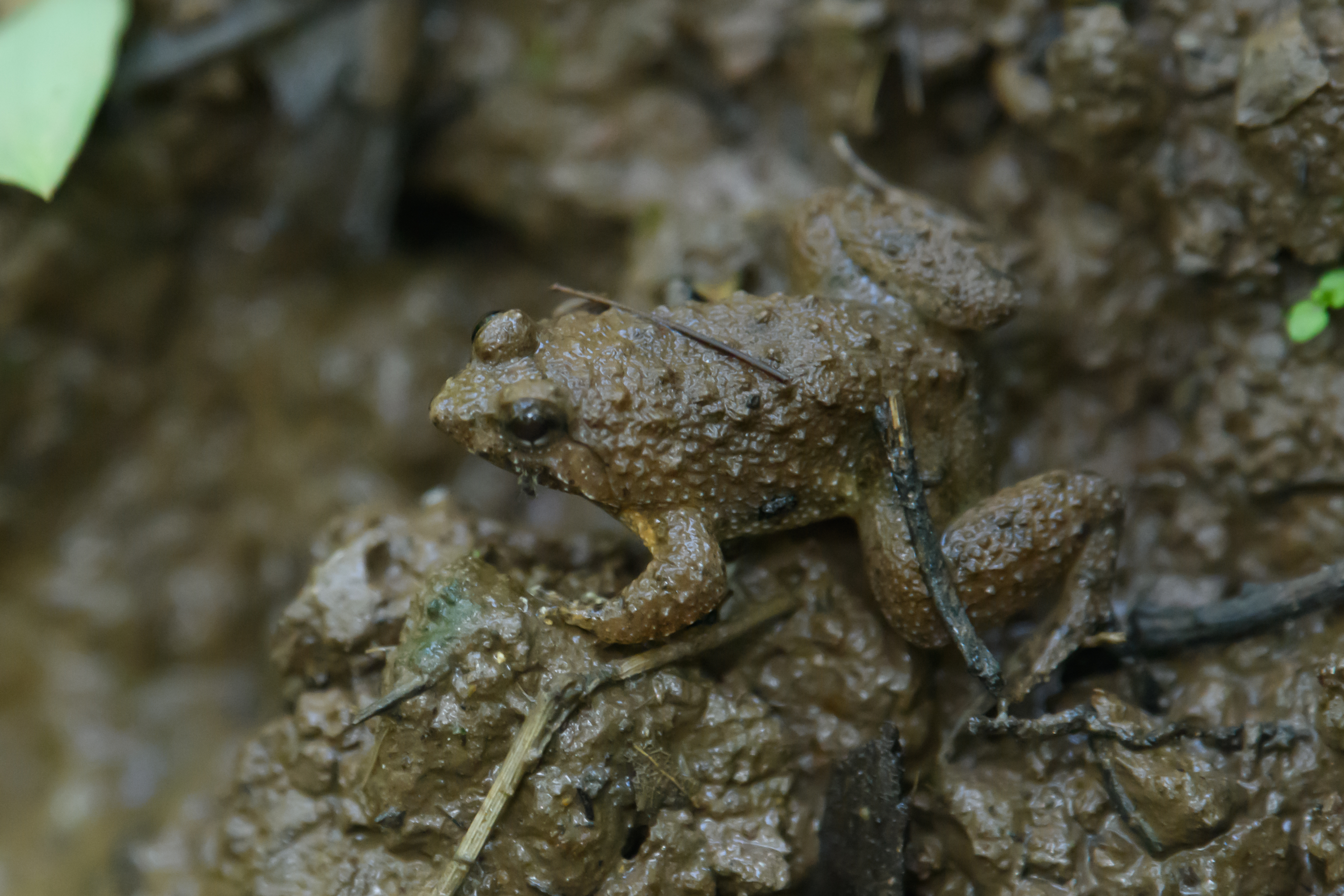
- Occidozyga magnapustulosa, Phu Kradueng National Park

Conservation status
- Least Concern (IUCN 3.1)

Scientific classification
- Kingdom: Animalia
- Phylum: Chordata
- Class: Amphibia
- Order: Anura
- Family: Dicroglossidae
- Genus: Occidozyga
- Species: O. magnapustulosa

Binomial name
- Occidozyga magnapustulosa (Taylor & Elbel, 1958)

Synonyms
- Occidozyga magnapustulosus (Taylor and Elbel, 1958); Micrixalus magnapustulosus Taylor and Elbel, 1958

= Occidozyga magnapustulosa =

Species of amphibian

Occidozyga magnapustulosa (common names: Thai oriental frog, tubercled flood frog, and others) is a species of frog in the family Dicroglossidae. It is known from scattered locations in northern and eastern Thailand, and in Laos and Vietnam.

The biology of this species is poorly known as it has been mixed with Occidozyga martensii and may be conspecific with that species. Specimens allocated to this species are found in seepages, puddles and other shallow waters along streams and rivers.
