= Hispaniolan giant tree frog =

Conservation status
- Vulnerable (IUCN 3.1)

Scientific classification
- Kingdom: Animalia
- Phylum: Chordata
- Class: Amphibia
- Order: Anura
- Family: Hylidae
- Genus: Osteopilus
- Species: O. vastus

Binomial name
- Osteopilus vastus (Cope, 1871)

Synonyms
- Hyla vasta Cope, 1871

Species of amphibian

The Hispaniolan giant tree frog (Osteopilus vastus), or Hispaniola tree frog, is a species of frog in the family Hylidae endemic to Hispaniola, found in both the Dominican Republic and Haiti.

== Taxonomy ==
Populations from the southern part of Hispaniola may represent a separate, as yet undescribed species.

== Distribution ==
It is patchily distributed in across the island. They are primarily found in mesic broadleaf forests but also in a range of agricultural habitats, such as cacao and coffee plantations and pastures. They can be found high in the canopy (up to 15 m). They are often found along creeks and streams; males call from trees overhanging running water. Eggs are also deposited in running water.

== Conservation ==
The species is threatened by habitat loss caused by degradation of streams and deforestation.
