= Green bromeliad frog =

Conservation status
- Vulnerable (IUCN 3.1)

Scientific classification
- Kingdom: Animalia
- Phylum: Chordata
- Class: Amphibia
- Order: Anura
- Family: Hylidae
- Genus: Osteopilus
- Species: O. wilderi

Binomial name
- Osteopilus wilderi (Dunn, 1925)

Synonyms
- Hyla wilderi Dunn, 1925; Hyla shrevei Taylor, 1952 (synonymy contested)

Species of amphibian

The green bromeliad frog (Osteopilus wilderi), or Wilder's treefrog, is a species of frog in the family Hylidae endemic to Jamaica. Its natural habitats are closed-canopy forests where it occurs in terrestrial and arboreal bromeliads. It is threatened by habitat loss.
