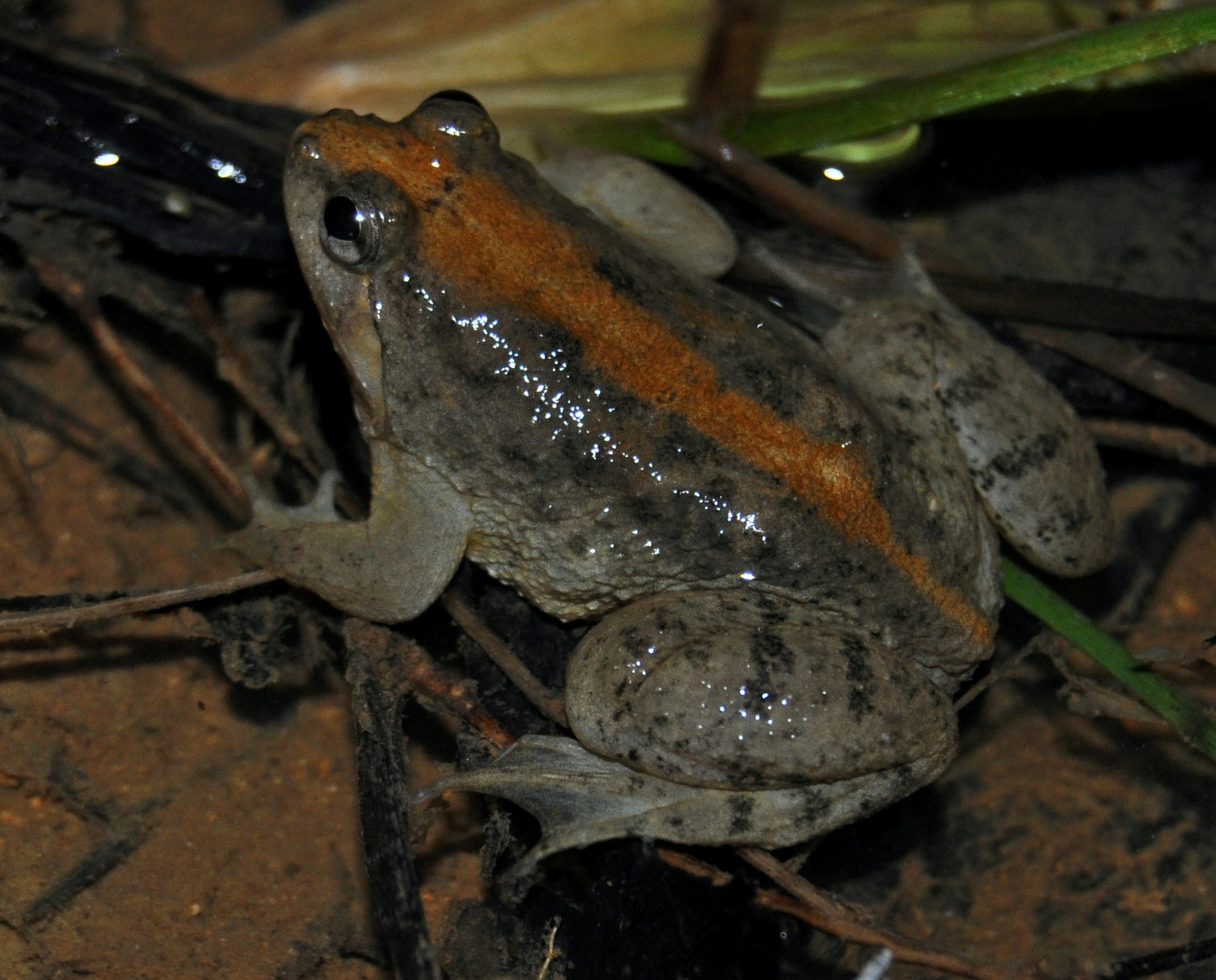
- Occidozyga sumatrana

Scientific classification
- Domain: Eukaryota
- Kingdom: Animalia
- Phylum: Chordata
- Class: Amphibia
- Order: Anura
- Family: Dicroglossidae
- Subfamily: Occidozyginae
- Genus: Occidozyga; Kuhl & Van Hasselt, 1822

Type species
- Rana lima Gravenhorst, 1829

Species
- 13, see text.

Synonyms
- Phrynoglossus Peters, 1867

= Occidozyga =

Genus of amphibians

Occidozyga is a genus of frogs in the family Dicroglossidae found in southeastern Asia between eastern India, southern China, and Java. They sometimes go under the common name Java frogs or floating frogs.

== Species ==
There are 13 species in this genus:

- Occidozyga baluensis (Boulenger, 1896)
- Occidozyga berbeza Matsui, Nishikawa, Eto, Hamidy, Hossman & Fukuyama, 2021
- Occidozyga celebensis Smith, 1927
- Occidozyga diminutiva (Taylor, 1922)
- Occidozyga floresiana Mertens, 1927
- Occidozyga laevis (Günther, 1858)
- Occidozyga lima (Gravenhorst, 1829)
- Occidozyga magnapustulosa (Taylor & Elbel, 1958)
- Occidozyga martensii (Peters, 1867)
- Occidozyga semipalmata Smith, 1927
- Occidozyga sumatrana (Peters, 1877)
- Occidozyga tompotika Iskandar, Arifin, and Rachmanasah, 2011
- Occidozyga vittata (Andersson, 1942)
