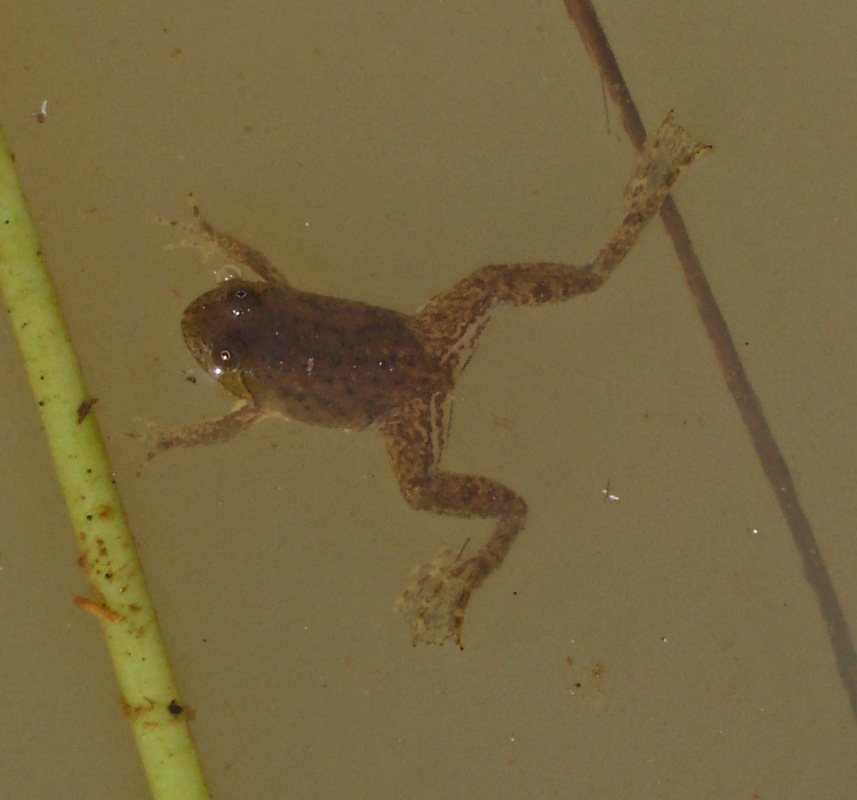

Conservation status
- Least Concern (IUCN 3.1)

Scientific classification
- Kingdom: Animalia
- Phylum: Chordata
- Class: Amphibia
- Order: Anura
- Family: Dicroglossidae
- Genus: Occidozyga
- Species: O. lima

Binomial name
- Occidozyga lima (Gravenhorst, 1829)

Synonyms
- Houlema obscura Gray, 1831; Osteosternum amoyense Wu, 1929

= Occidozyga lima =

Green puddle frog

Species of amphibian

Occidozyga lima, the green puddle frog, rough-skinned floating frog, pearly skin puddle frog, or pointed-tongued floating frog, is a species of frog in the family Dicroglossidae. It is found in Bangladesh, Cambodia, China, Hong Kong, India, Indonesia, Laos, Malaysia, Myanmar, Thailand, Vietnam, and possibly Nepal.

Its natural habitats are subtropical or tropical seasonally wet or flooded lowland grassland, rivers, swamps, intermittent freshwater lakes, freshwater marshes, intermittent freshwater marshes, ponds, irrigated land, seasonally flooded agricultural land, and canals and ditches. These frogs are also found in the pet trade.

O. lima may actually consist of separate species, with Chan (2013) arguing for 3 separate species: (1) Java, Indonesia; (2) southern China to northern Indochina; (3) southern Indochina to Myanmar.
