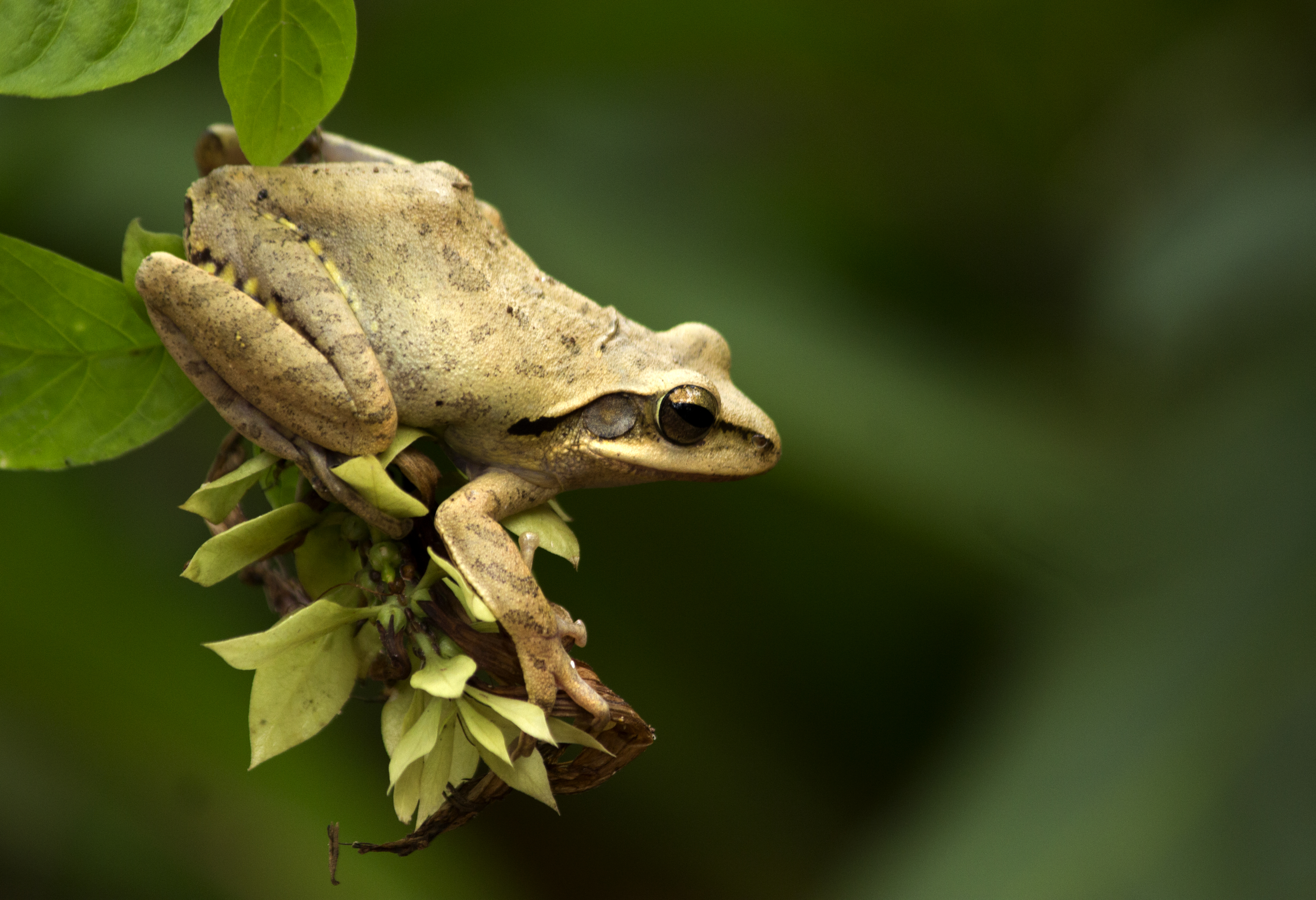

Conservation status
- Least Concern (IUCN 3.1)

Scientific classification
- Kingdom: Animalia
- Phylum: Chordata
- Class: Amphibia
- Order: Anura
- Family: Rhacophoridae
- Genus: Polypedates
- Species: P. maculatus

Binomial name
- Polypedates maculatus (J.E.Gray, 1830)

Synonyms
- Hyla maculata J.E.Gray, 1930; Rhacophorus maculatus (J.E.Gray, 1830); Polypedates himalayensis (Annandale, 1912)

= Polypedates maculatus =

Species of amphibian

Polypedates maculatus, the Indian tree frog, or Chunam tree frog, is a common species of tree frog found in South Asia. It was described by John Edward Gray in 1830.

Although now considered as a separate species again, for a time, the Himalayan tree frog was considered as a subspecies of the Indian tree frog (as P. m. himalayensis). Polypedates leucomystax, a very similar species, was formerly included in P. maculatus.

== Description ==
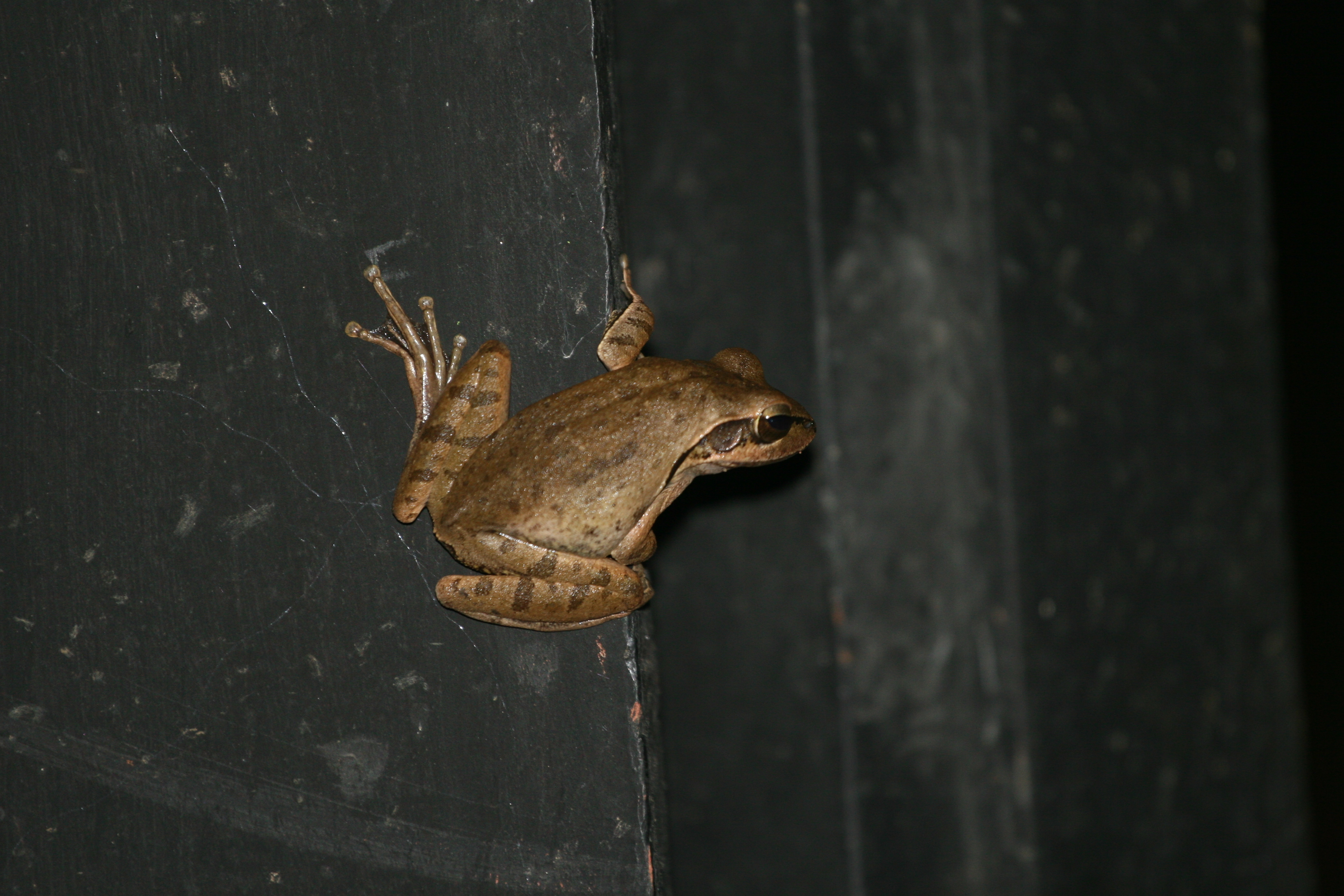
At Kandalama, Sri Lanka

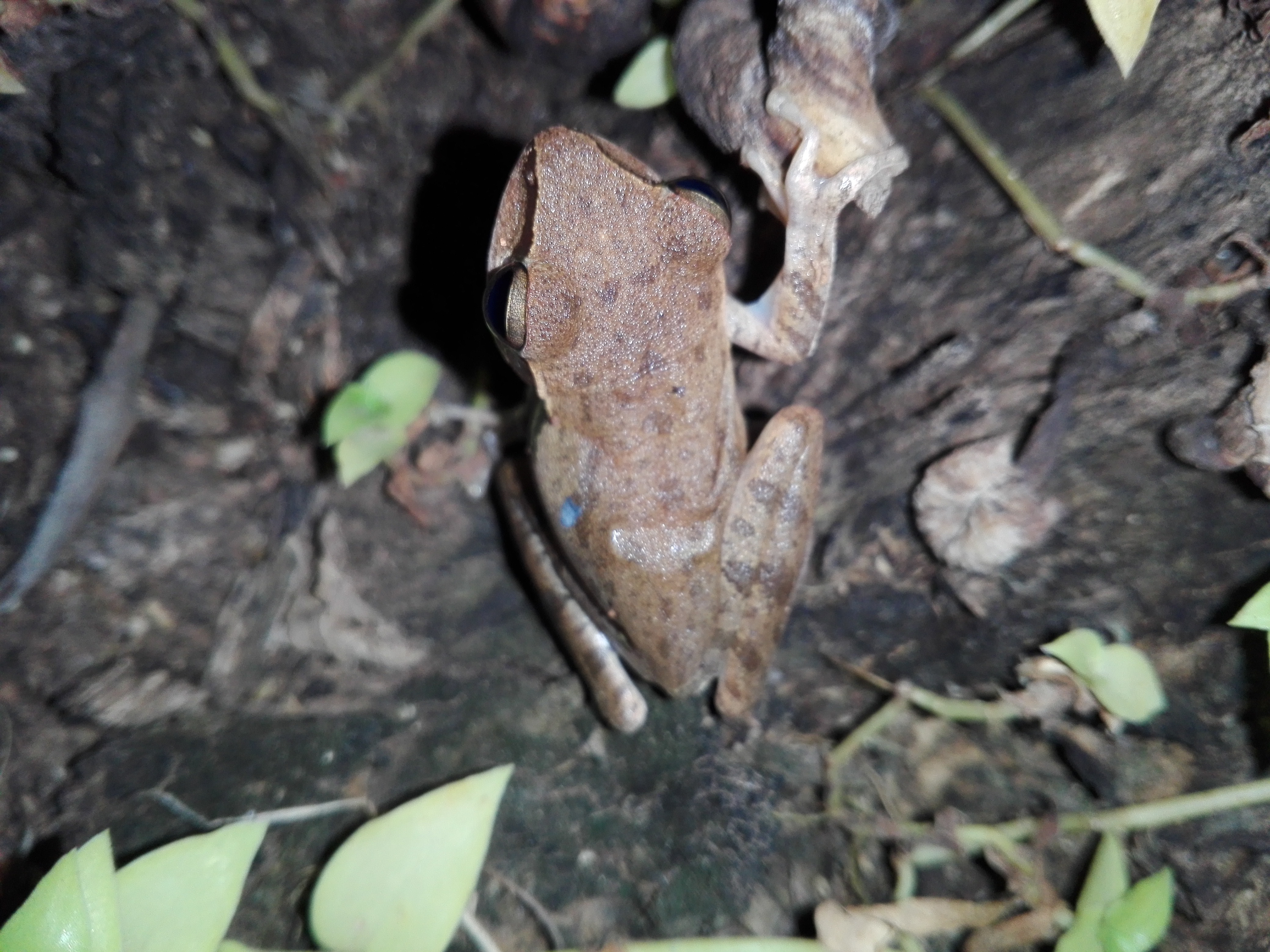
Head dorsal view in Trincomalee, Sri Lanka

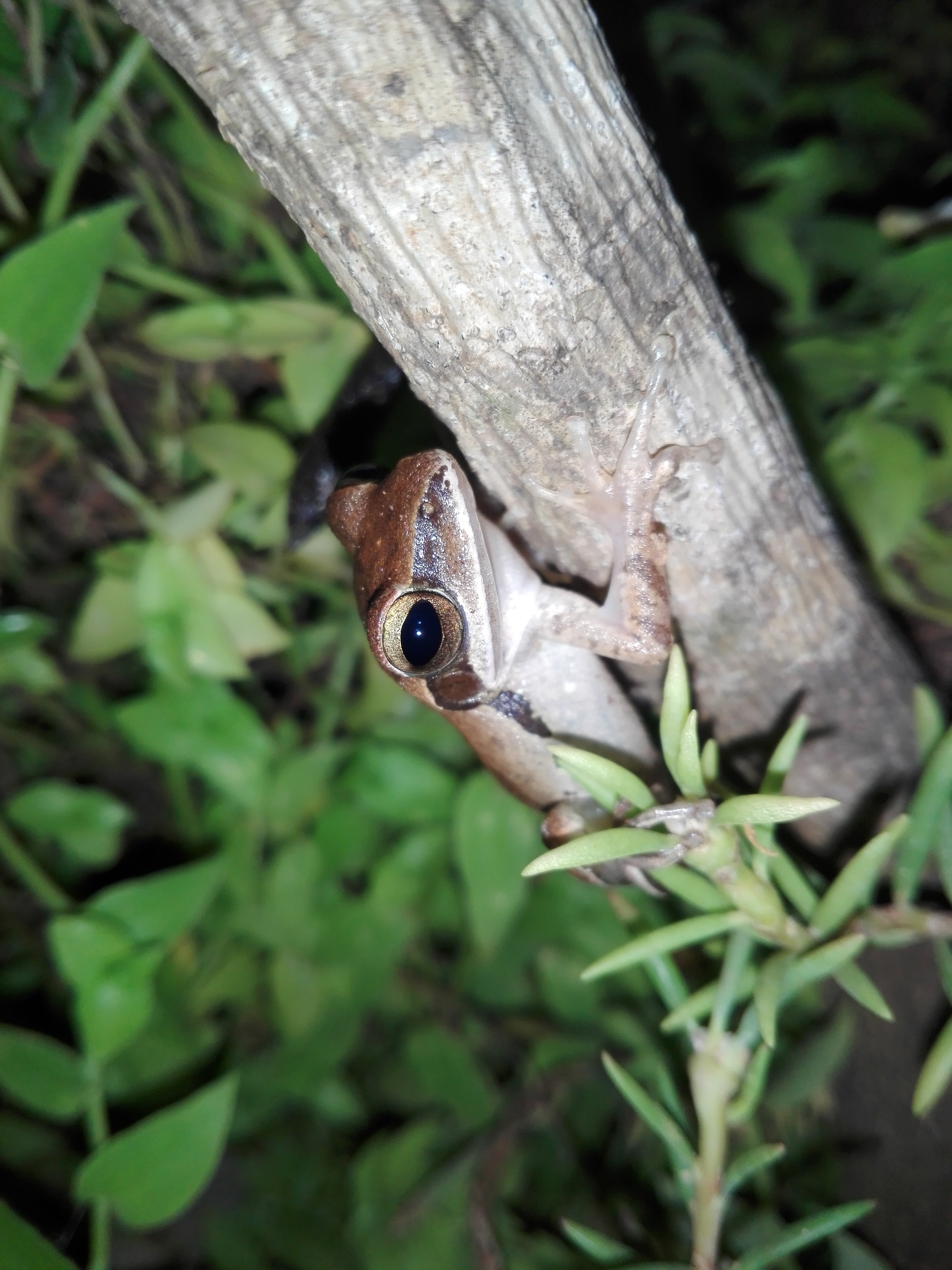
Head lateral view in Trincomalee, Sri Lanka

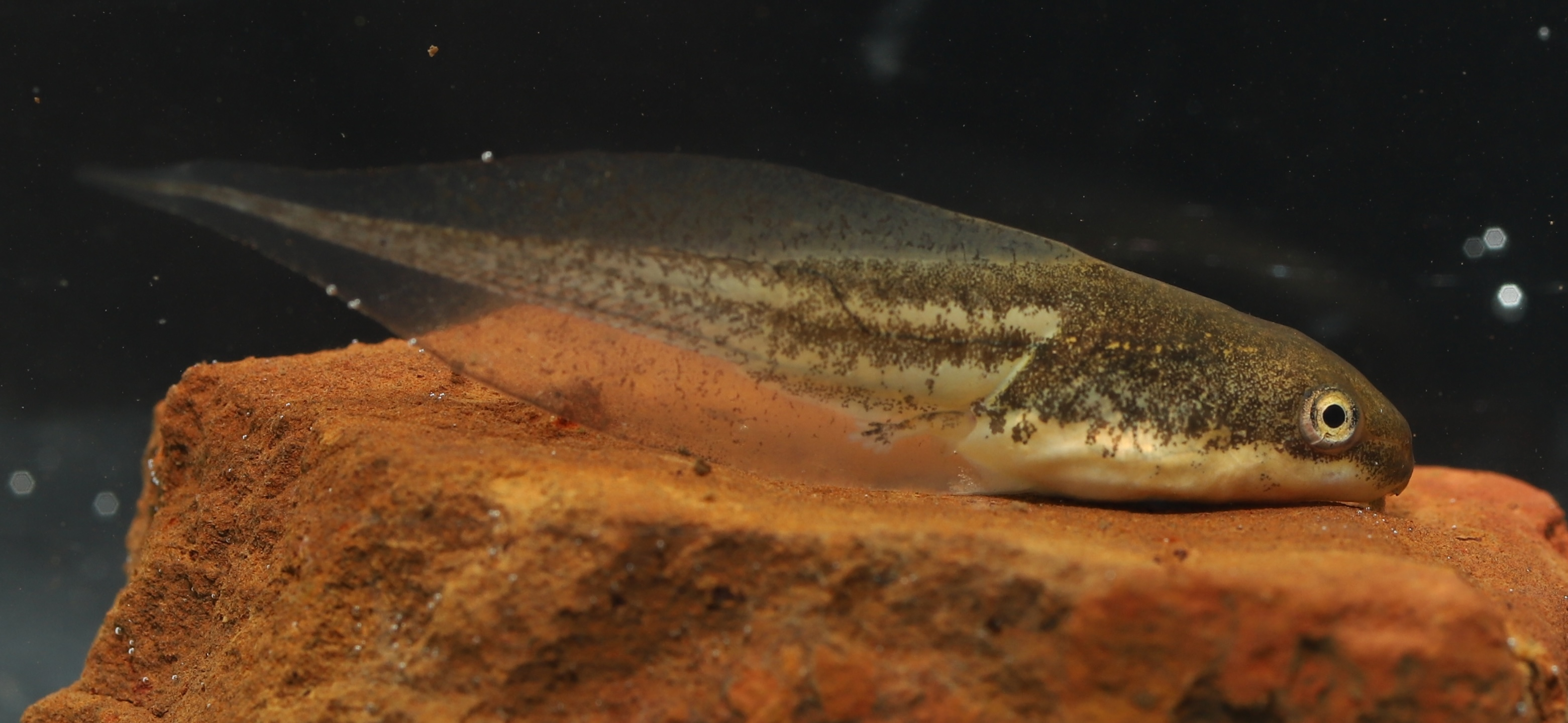
Tadpole of P. maculatus

These frogs measure about 7–8 cm in body length. They are mostly brownish, yellowish, greyish, or whitish above, with darker spots or markings, rarely with an hourglass-shaped figure on the back of the head and the front of the back. The loreal and temporal regions are dark; there is a light line on the upper lip. The hind side of the thighs has round, yellow spots, which are usually separated by a dark-brown or purplish network. The skin is smooth above, and granulated on the belly and under the thighs; a fold extends from the eye to the shoulder. Males have internal vocal sacs.

The vomerine teeth are arranged in two more or less oblique series between the choanae or commencing close to the inner front edge of the latter. The skin of head is free; a more or less developed bony arch – sometimes slender and partly ligamentous, sometimes very thick and swollen – extends on each side from the posterior border of the frontoparietal bones to the squamosals. The snout is pointed with a rounded tip, about as long as the diameter of the orbit, the canthus rostralis is distinct, and the loral region is concave. The nostril is located much nearer to the end of the snout than to the eye. The interorbital space is broader than the upper eyelid. The eardrum measures about three-fourths the diameter of the eye.

The fingers are barely webbed, and the toes are two-thirds webbed. The disks of fingers and toes are moderately developed; that of the third finger measures two-fifths to one-half the diameter of the eye. The subarticular tubercles are of moderate size. When the hind leg is held alongside the body, the tibiotarsal articulation reaches the eye, or between the eye and the tip of the snout.

== Distribution and ecology ==
It is widespread throughout Bhutan, India, Nepal, and Sri Lanka, as well as western and southern Bangladesh to Chittagong District; its range might also extend into nearby China and Myanmar. This common and adaptable frog is listed as Least Concern by the IUCN.

They may use day roosts regularly. Their call is a sudden short and rapid series of rattling rat-tats.

They wipe themselves with skin secretions consisting of mucus and lipids that help in reducing moisture loss. When temperatures are higher, they secrete from the skin ("sweat"), pant, and adopt lighter skin colours.

In south India they can be a nuisance to households as they enter homes in search of food. They can climb walls with the help of their webbed feet and reach even higher floors, entering through the open windows.
