= Common rain frog =

Common rain frog may refer to:

- Breviceps acutirostris, also known as the strawberry rain frog, a frog in the family Brevicipitidae found in a small region at the southern tip of Africa
- Breviceps adspersus, also known as the bushveld rain frog, a frog in the family Brevicipitidae found throughout large areas of southeast Africa
