= Hispaniolan yellow tree frog =

Conservation status
- Vulnerable (IUCN 3.1)

Scientific classification
- Kingdom: Animalia
- Phylum: Chordata
- Class: Amphibia
- Order: Anura
- Family: Hylidae
- Genus: Osteopilus
- Species: O. pulchrilineatus

Binomial name
- Osteopilus pulchrilineatus (Cope, 1870)

Synonyms
- Hyla pulchrilineata Cope, 1870 "1869"

Species of amphibian

The Hispaniolan yellow tree frog (Osteopilus pulchrilineatus), or common treefrog, is a species of frog in the family Hylidae endemic to Hispaniola, where it is found in both the Dominican Republic and Haiti.

== Description ==
Adult Hispaniola yellow tree frogs can grow to be about 43 mm for females, while the males tend to be slightly smaller and only grow to be about 39 mm. They have 3 dorsal lines that can be yellow, tan, green, or brown that are used to most easily identify the species. The lower sides of the frog are usually yellow in color as well. They can be active during the night when temperatures range from 24 to 27 °C. The Osteopilus genus tend to follow a generalist diet and usually choose prey based on their size

== Habitat ==
Osteopilus pulchrilineatus is one of four endemic species to Hispaniola and can only survive in a specific set of environmental conditions. Its natural habitats are mesic broadleaf forests, riparian forests (including forest remnants), mangrove forests, grasslands, and marshes. It can also be found in agricultural landscapes (e.g., rice plantations, coffee and cacao plantations, and in the presence of livestock). Osteopilus pulchrilineatus is known to have at least six different breeding habitats, most of which are marine like habitats. These include vegetative ponds with nearby open grassland, ponds in mountainous areas that have a small area, streams in mountain forests, ephemeral pools in forested areas, pools found within rice fields, and rivers and streams of forested areas. Males are known to call in flooded pools after heavy rains. The estimated area that Osteopilus pulchrilineatus is said to inhabit ranges from 1,3000 km^{2} to 2,000 km^{2} and elevations up to almost 1,700 km^{2}.

== Conservation ==
The species was listed on the IUCN Red List as endangered until April 2012, when a new evaluation downgraded the species to vulnerable. Their population is currently declining to the point that they are at risk for extirpation within the next decade. The frog exists in highly fragmented populations. Even though it is found in modified habitats, its persistence seems to depend on forests and/or wetlands as the core habitat, making it vulnerable to further habitat loss.

=== Threats ===
The biggest threat to this species is habitat loss, fragmentation, and degradation. There are both human and natural factors that lead to these threats to its populations. Some of these include residential development, mining, invasive species and diseases, habitat loss due to ranching and wood logging. Habitat loss for agriculture, usually for the production of sugarcane, is another huge threat to tree frogs in the region. Another threat to their populations comes from the decline in stream quality in Hispaniola from these human activities. In 2011, the Caribbean Amphibian Ark Conservation Needs Assessment found that the frog populations needed more in-situ conservation action if they are to survive long term. More specifically, preserving the forests and wetlands that the species is known to inhabit within the region. The species is not known to be threatened by trade or captivity.
