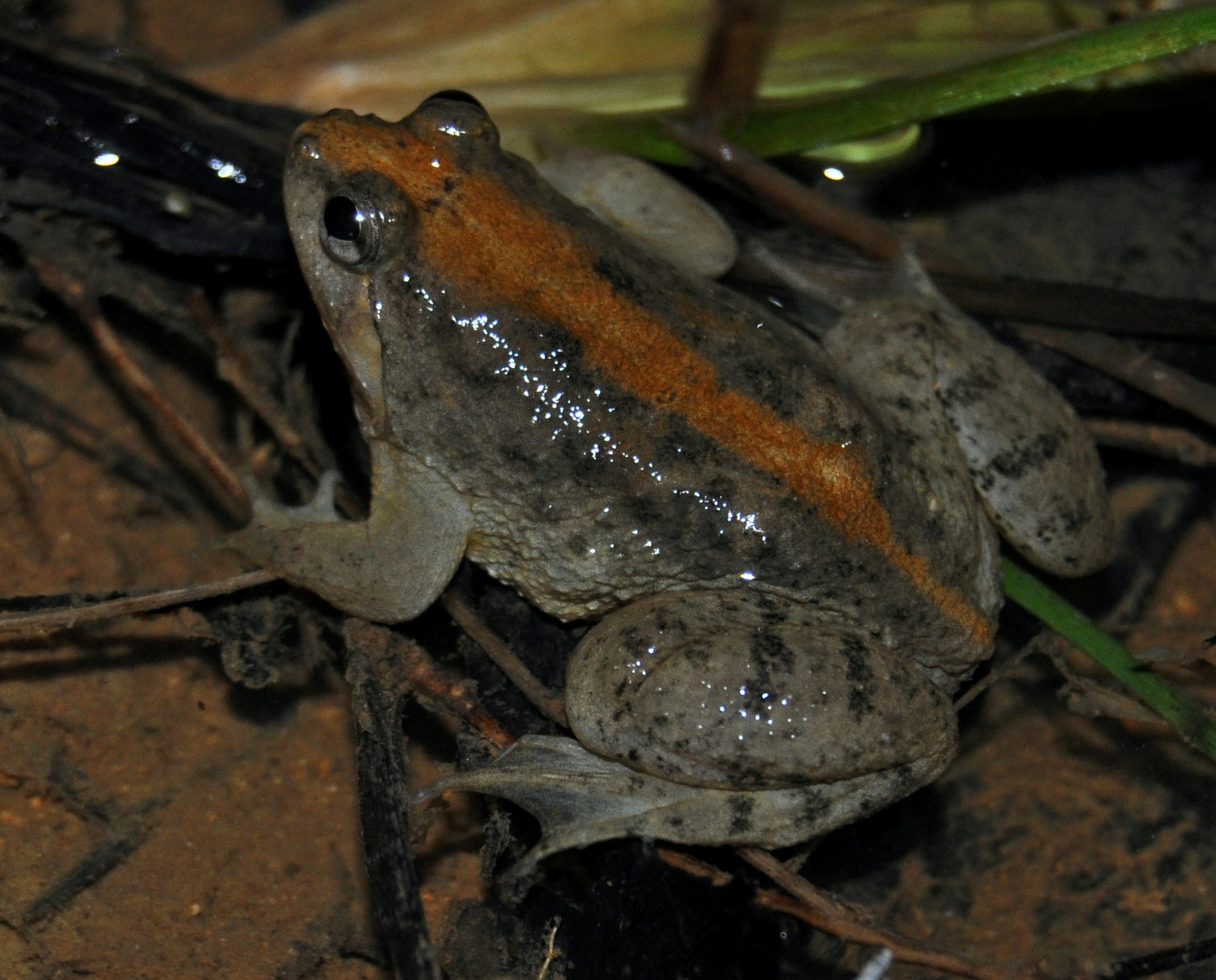
- Occidozyga sumatrana from Ciampea, Bogor, Indonesia

Conservation status
- Least Concern (IUCN 3.1)

Scientific classification
- Kingdom: Animalia
- Phylum: Chordata
- Class: Amphibia
- Order: Anura
- Family: Dicroglossidae
- Genus: Occidozyga
- Species: O. sumatrana

Binomial name
- Occidozyga sumatrana (Peters, 1877)

= Sumatran puddle frog =

Species of amphibian

The Sumatran puddle frog (Occidozyga sumatrana) is a species of frog in the family Dicroglossidae. It might be endemic to Indonesia. However, it has often been confused with Occidozyga laevis, and was also for long considered to be its junior synonym.

Its known distribution is restricted to Sumatra and Java, as well as Sipora and Simeulue islands. The true distribution of this species is therefore poorly known but likely to be wider (perhaps from India through Malaysia to southern China). Its natural habitats are tropical moist lowland forests, rivers, intermittent freshwater marshes, and canals and ditches. It is threatened by habitat loss. However it has most recently been reported in Singapore on August 23, 2018.
