= Yellow bromeliad frog =

Conservation status
- Endangered (IUCN 3.1)

Scientific classification
- Kingdom: Animalia
- Phylum: Chordata
- Class: Amphibia
- Order: Anura
- Family: Hylidae
- Genus: Osteopilus
- Species: O. marianae

Binomial name
- Osteopilus marianae (Dunn, 1926)

Synonyms
- Hyla marianae Dunn, 1926

Species of amphibian

The yellow bromeliad frog (Osteopilus marianae), or Spaldings tree frog, is a species of frog in the family Hylidae endemic to central Jamaica. Its natural habitats are old-growth pine and deciduous forests where it is found in bromeliads. Eggs are also laid in bromeliads. It is threatened by habitat loss (deforestation).
