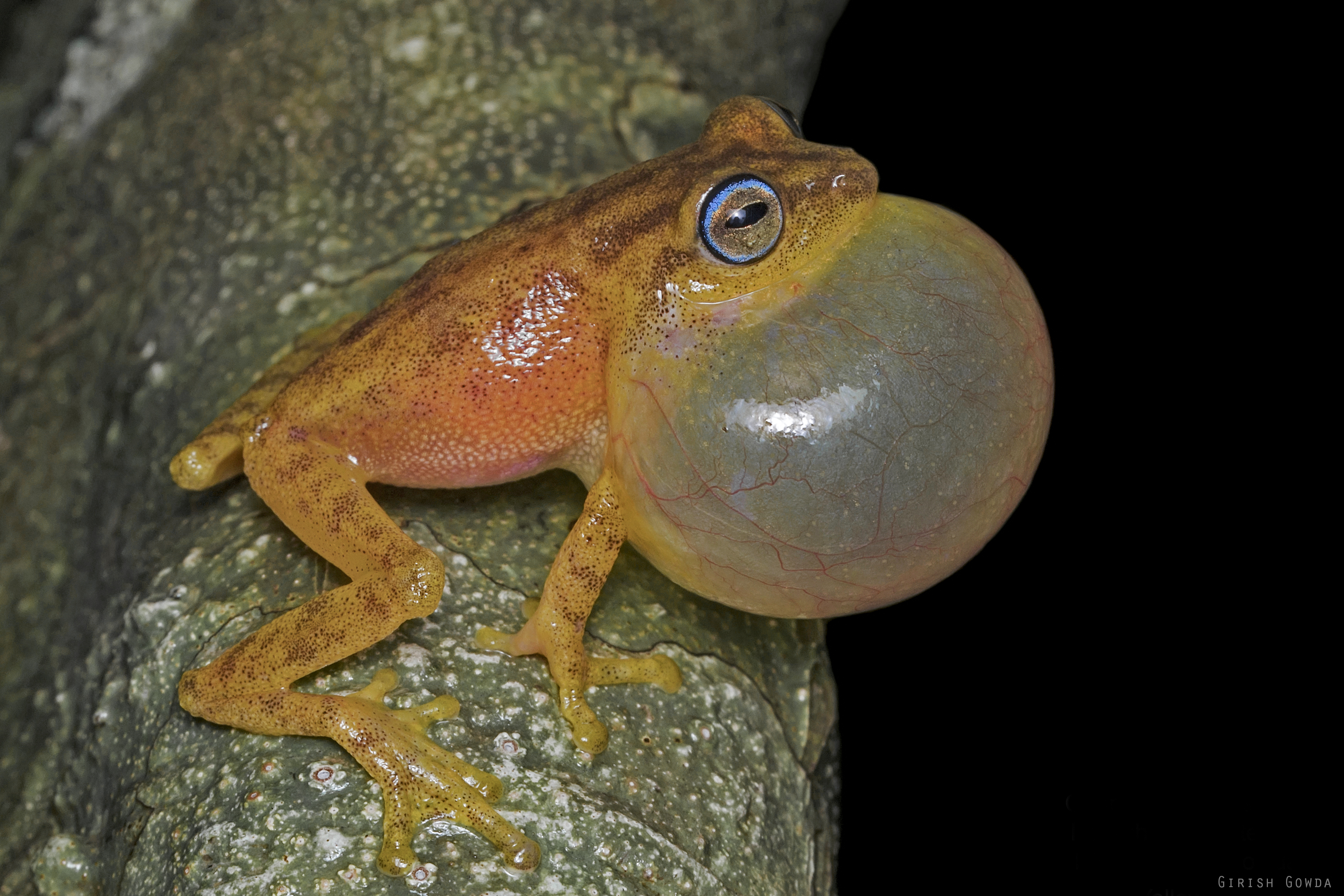
- Male R. luteolus at Agumbe

Conservation status
- Least Concern (IUCN 3.1)

Scientific classification
- Kingdom: Animalia
- Phylum: Chordata
- Class: Amphibia
- Order: Anura
- Family: Rhacophoridae
- Genus: Raorchestes
- Species: R. luteolus

Binomial name
- Raorchestes luteolus (Kuramoto and Joshy, 2003)

Synonyms
- Philautus neelanethrus Kuramoto and Joshy, 2003; Philautus neelanethrus Gururaja, Aravind, Ali, Ramachandra, Velavan, Krishnakumar, and Aggarwal, 2007

Audio
- Call recorded at Coorg, Karnataka

= Raorchestes luteolus =

Species of amphibian

Raorchestes luteolus (sometimes known as Coorg yellow bush frog) is a species of frog in the family Rhacophoridae. It is endemic to the Western Ghats, India, where it is only known from the state of Karnataka. Many of the known populations are from the Kodagu district, known also by its anglicised former name of Coorg—hence the common name. It is also known from the Shimoga district in the Sharavathi basin where it was described as a new species, Philautus neelanethrus, but this is now considered to be a junior synonym of Raorchestes luteolus.

== Description ==
Raorchestes luteolus is a small frog, males measuring 24–29 mm (0.94–1.14 in) in snout-vent length. Its colour is variable. The dominant colour form is yellowish brown with light-brownish lines or light-yellowish with discontinuous light-brown lines, but some individuals may be almost golden yellow with only faint spots. The iris is light brown encircled with a bluish green outer ring.

Raorchestes luteolus is a close relative of Raorchestes travancoricus with which it can be confused. The distinguishing characters are its medium size (mean adult male snout-vent length 26.8 mm), pointed snout, rounded canthus, yellow or yellowish brown dorsum with dark brown spots and faint discontinuous lines, and loreal and golden yellow or yellowish brown tympanic regions.

== Habitat ==
Raorchestes luteolus are most commonly found in disturbed habitats, near coffee plantations adjacent to primary forests and waysides. In Sharavathi it was also found from Myristica swamps. This frog has been observed between 500 and 1250 meters above sea level.

== Behaviour ==
Raorchestes luteolus are often found on leaves or stems of shrubs about one metre above the ground. Male frogs start calling at dusk, first under the leaf litter and then ascending to the vegetation. Call characteristics may differ between populations; in particular, between the Sharavathi frogs described as Philautus neelanethrus and the nominal Raorchestes luteolus.

== Life cycle ==
The life cycle of Raorchestes luteolus is not known in any detail, but the observation of a pair in amplexus away from water suggests that it has direct development, as is typical for the genus Raorchestes.

== Gallery ==
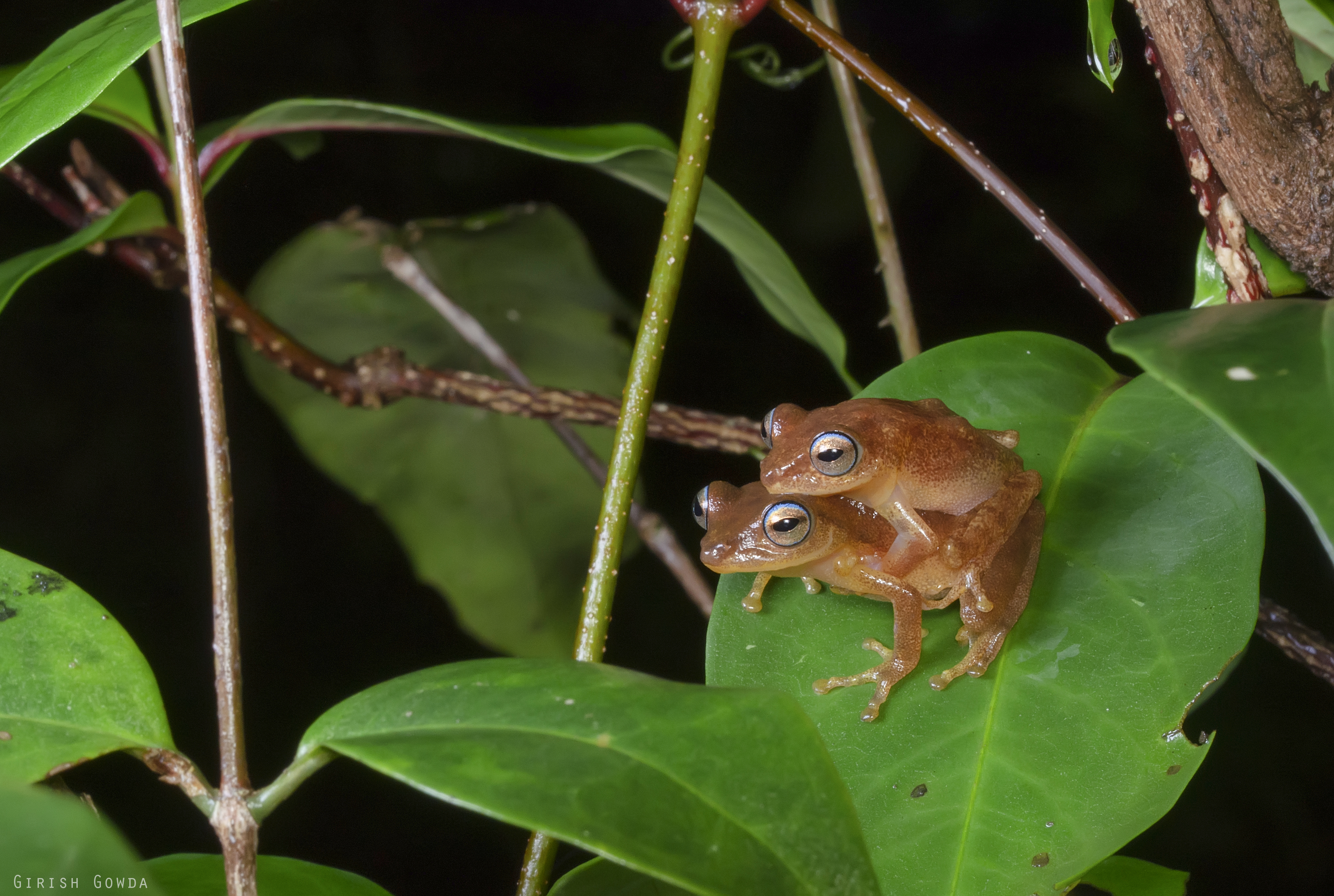
Raorchestes luteolus in amplexus at Agumbe

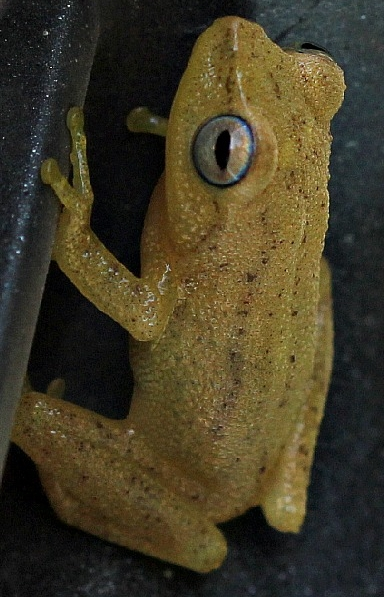
Raorchestes luteolus from Kudremukh

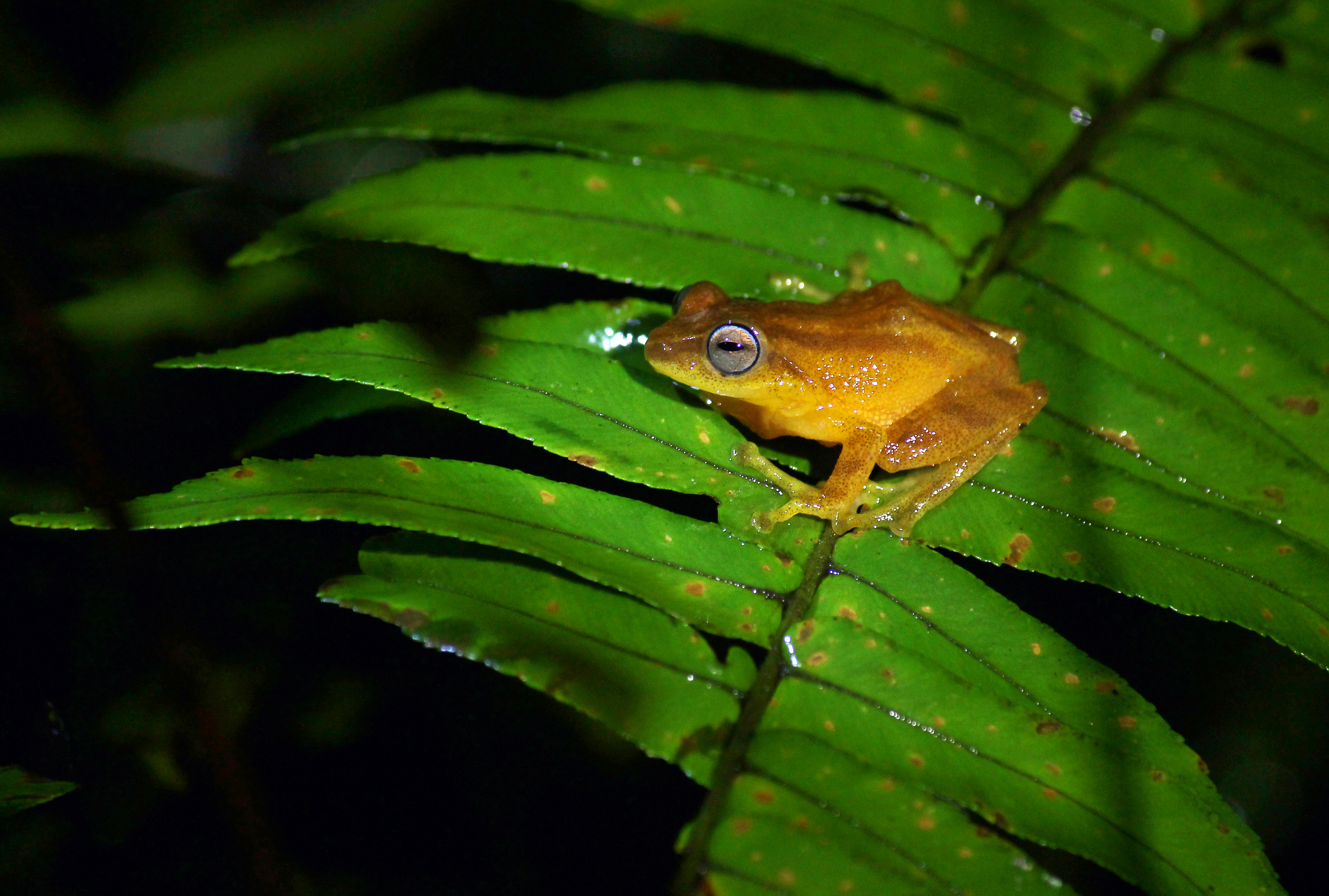
Raorchestes luteolus from Bisle

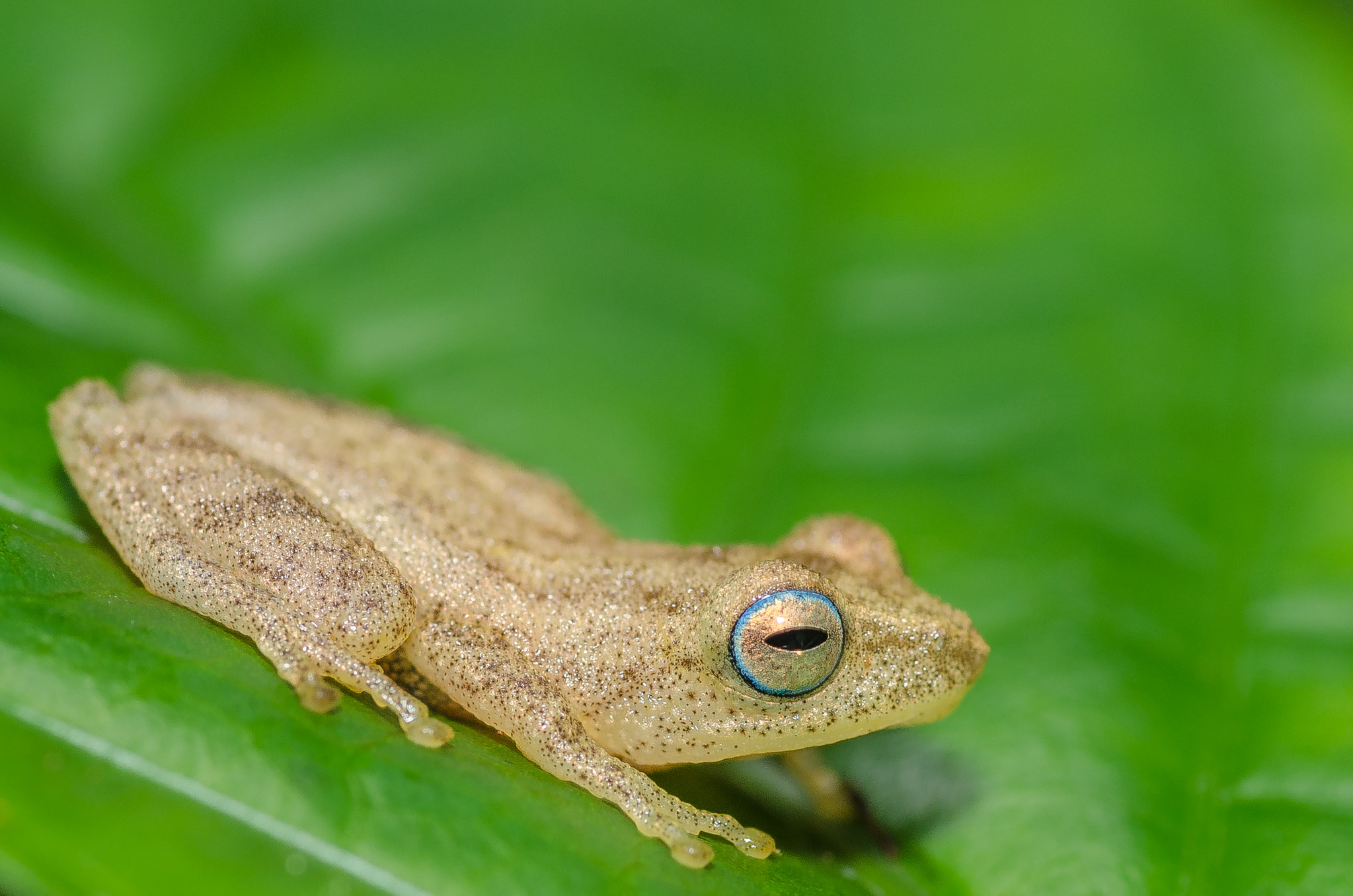
Raorchestes luteolus (Yellow bush frog)

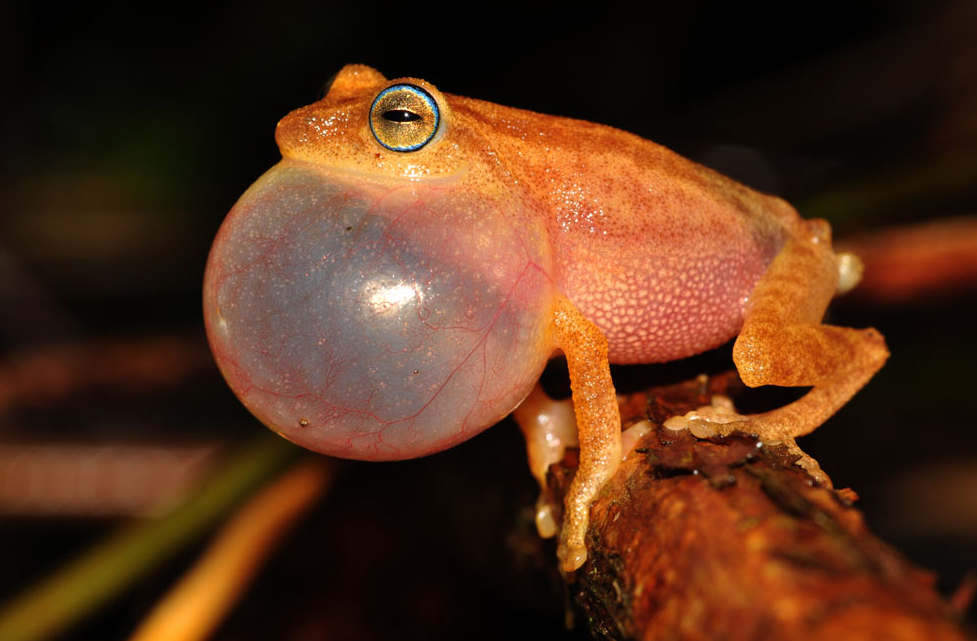
Male Raorchestes luteolus vocalizing

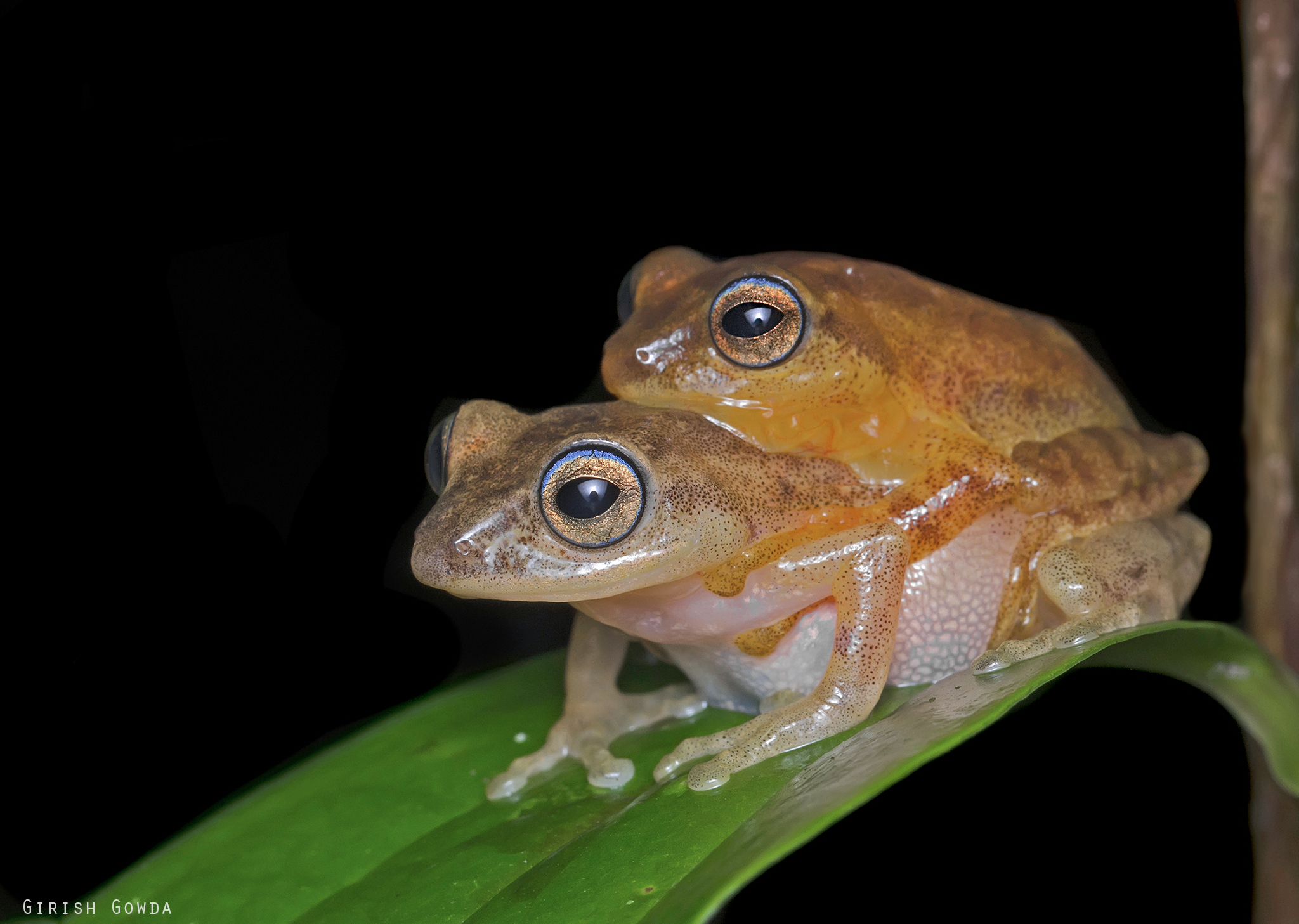
Pair in amplexus
