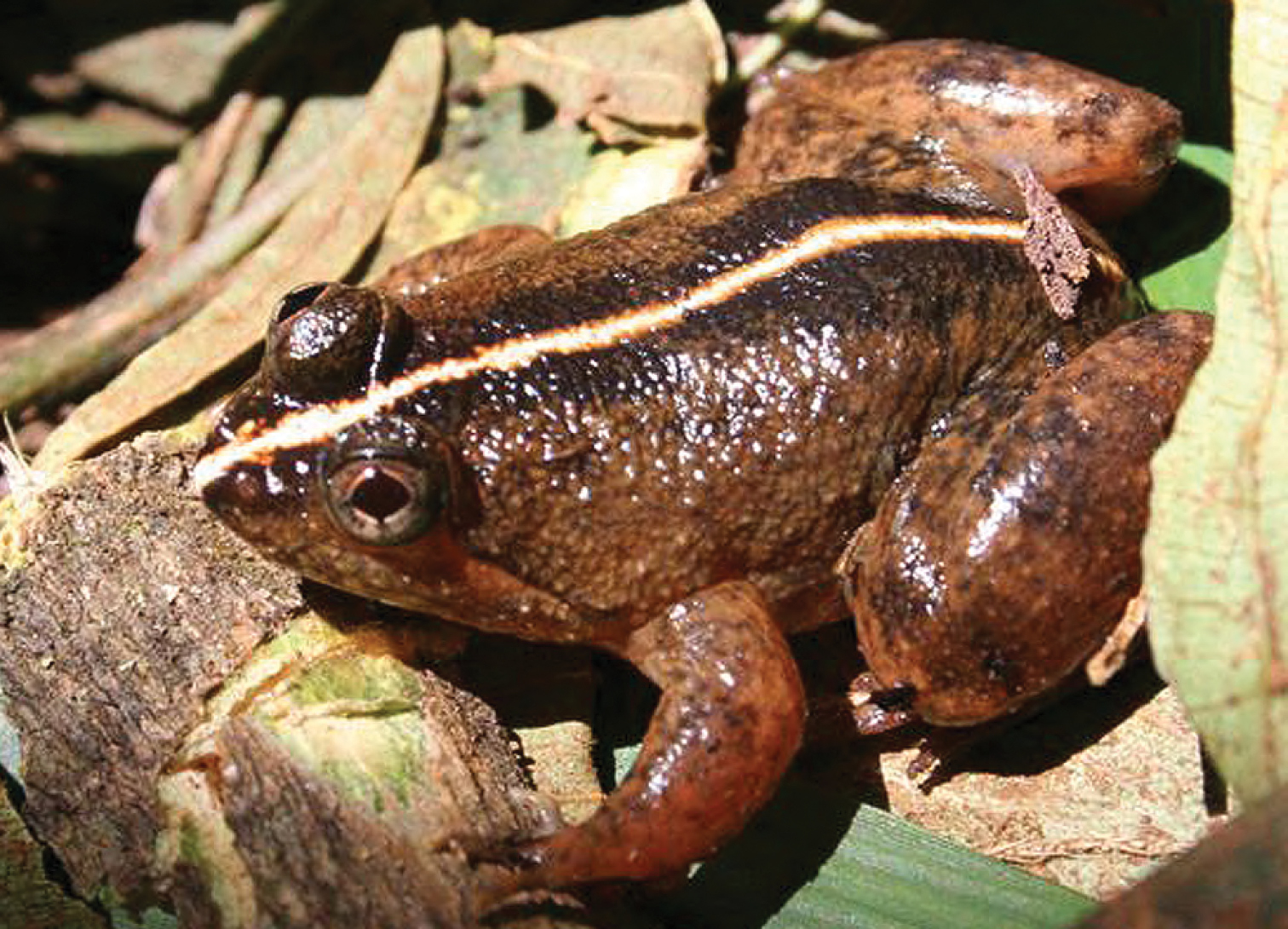

Conservation status
- Least Concern (IUCN 3.1)

Scientific classification
- Kingdom: Animalia
- Phylum: Chordata
- Class: Amphibia
- Order: Anura
- Family: Dicroglossidae
- Genus: Occidozyga
- Species: O. laevis

Binomial name
- Occidozyga laevis (Günther, 1858)

= Common puddle frog =

Species of amphibian

The common puddle frog, puddle frog, or yellow bellied puddle frog (Occidozyga laevis) is a species of frog in the family Dicroglossidae. It has often been confused with Occidozyga sumatrana (which until 1998 was considered to be a junior synonym O. laevis) and records of this species outside the Philippines likely represent that species.

== Range ==
The common puddle frog lives in peninsular Thailand (including Phuket), Malaysia, Singapore, Borneo, Anambas Islands (Tarempah), Riau Islands (Natuna Besar) and the Philippines.

== Habitat ==
Its natural habitats are tropical moist lowland forests, rivers, intermittent rivers, swamps, intermittent freshwater marshes, coastal freshwater lagoons, arable land, pastureland, rural gardens, urban areas, water storage areas, ponds, aquaculture ponds, irrigated land, seasonally flooded agricultural land and introduced vegetation.
