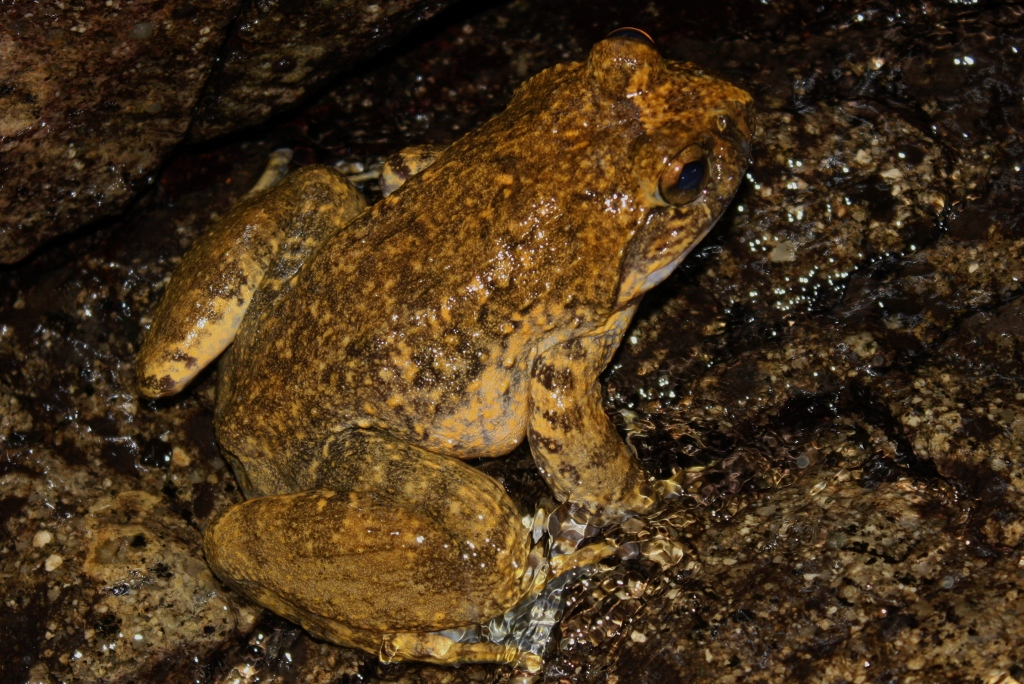

Conservation status
- Vulnerable (IUCN 3.1)

Scientific classification
- Kingdom: Animalia
- Phylum: Chordata
- Class: Amphibia
- Order: Anura
- Family: Dicroglossidae
- Genus: Quasipaa
- Species: Q. spinosa

Binomial name
- Quasipaa spinosa (David, 1875)

Synonyms
- Rana latrans David, 1872; Rana spinosa David, 1875; Paa spinosa (David, 1875)

= Quasipaa spinosa =

Species of amphibian

Quasipaa spinosa is a species of frog in the family Dicroglossidae. It is known under many common names, including Chinese spiny frog, giant spiny frog, Chinese edible frog, and spiny paa frog. Its names refer to the distinctive characteristics of the species, relatively large size and the spiny chest of male frogs. Giant in frog terms only, it can nevertheless grow to lengths above 10 cm (4 in); this makes it the largest frog in Hong Kong.

== Taxonomy ==
Recent molecular phylogenetic analyses have suggested that Quasipaa spinosa is split in three distinct lineages; the nominal Quasipaa spinosa may thus represent a cryptic species complex. The lineages are geographically distinct; one lineage is found in Yunnan, another one in southeastern China (Anhui, Zhejiang, northern Fujian, and Jiangxi), and the third one in south-central China (southern Fujian, Jiangxi, Hunan, Guangdong, and Guangxi). In this analysis, Quasipaa exilispinosa is nested within Quasipaa spinosa. Its sibling species is Quasipaa acanthophora from Vietnam.

The complete mitochondrial genome (18,012 base pairs in length) of Quasipaa spinosa has been sequenced, helping to shed light into the phylogeny of Quasipaa and related frogs.

== Distribution and habitat ==
It is found in China south of the Yangtze River, including Hong Kong. It is expected to be found in Vietnam, Laos, and Myanmar. No certain records exist from Vietnam, earlier records may refer to Quasipaa acanthophora described in 2009 as a new species from that country. It may also have been mixed with Quasipaa verrucospinosa and Nanorana yunnanensis.

Quasipaa spinosa is associated with rocky streams in evergreen forests and open countryside on hills and mountains. Its altitude range is about 200–1,500 m (660–4,920 ft) above sea level.

== Description and life cycle ==
The most distinctive characteristic of Quasipaa spinosa are the keratinized skin spines in the chest of males. It is dark brown in colour, interspersed with dense, yellowish mottling.

Quasipaa spinosa are moderately large frogs: males grow to a snout–vent length of about 80 mm (3.1 in) and females to 82 mm (3.2 in) or more, up to 128 mm (5.0 in) in snout–vent length. It is the largest frog in Hong Kong. Later studies has shown that usually males are larger than females, but with considerable overlap between sexes. Body size is positively correlated with maximum temperature and rainfall. Mean body weight among males may reach at least 133 g (4.7 oz).

Quasipaa spinosa breeds in streams, laying the eggs in water under stones. Reproduction takes place in April–October. Male frogs call near slow-flowing sections of streams or around pools adjacent to streams. The advertisement call consists of three to seven notes, the last being the longest. Pairs in amplexus are found within the chorus area.

Population demography of Quasipaa spinosa has been studied for two populations in the Tai Mo Shan Country Park in Hong Kong. These populations exhibit high site fidelity. Populations have low densities (13–42 frogs per 100 m of stream) and female-biased sex ratio. Each female produced an average 1.26 juveniles that survived until the age of 2 years. Annual survival was low, 38–65%.

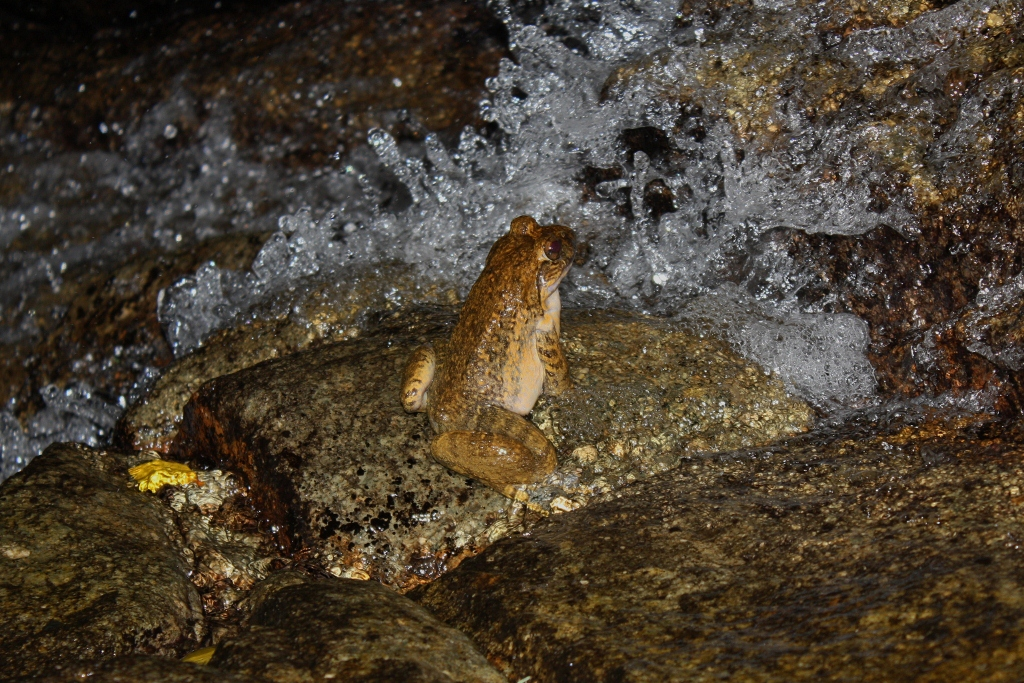
Quasipaa spinosa in its stream side habitat.

== Utilization ==
Quasipaa spinosa is an important food and medicinal resource in China and considered as a delicacy. Populations are heavily harvested, and overcollection is implicated in population declines. In Jiangxi province alone, the value of production of Quasipaa spinosa for domestic consumption is of the same magnitude as global trade of frog meat. Quasipaa spinosa are also farmed, but farming operations are likely based on tadpoles or juveniles sourced from wild population, instead of captive breeding. Thus, farming may not reduce the pressure on wild populations.

== Conservation ==
This species is believed to have declined dramatically in abundance. It is classified as "Vulnerable" by the International Union for Conservation of Nature because the decline is estimated to be more than 30% over the last three generations. The main reasons for the decline is (over)collection for human consumption, and it is also threatened by habitat loss caused by agriculture and dam construction. Moderate levels of exploitation are sufficient to increase extinction risk markedly, at least in small populations.

Quasipaa spinosa is not designated as a State Protected Animal in China, and there are no regulations for its protection, except in protected areas. However, sale of wild Quasipaa spinosa is now forbidden in Fujian, and farmed frogs need to be certified. Whether these regulations are enforced is not yet known, but they have potential to help wild populations.

== Parasites ==
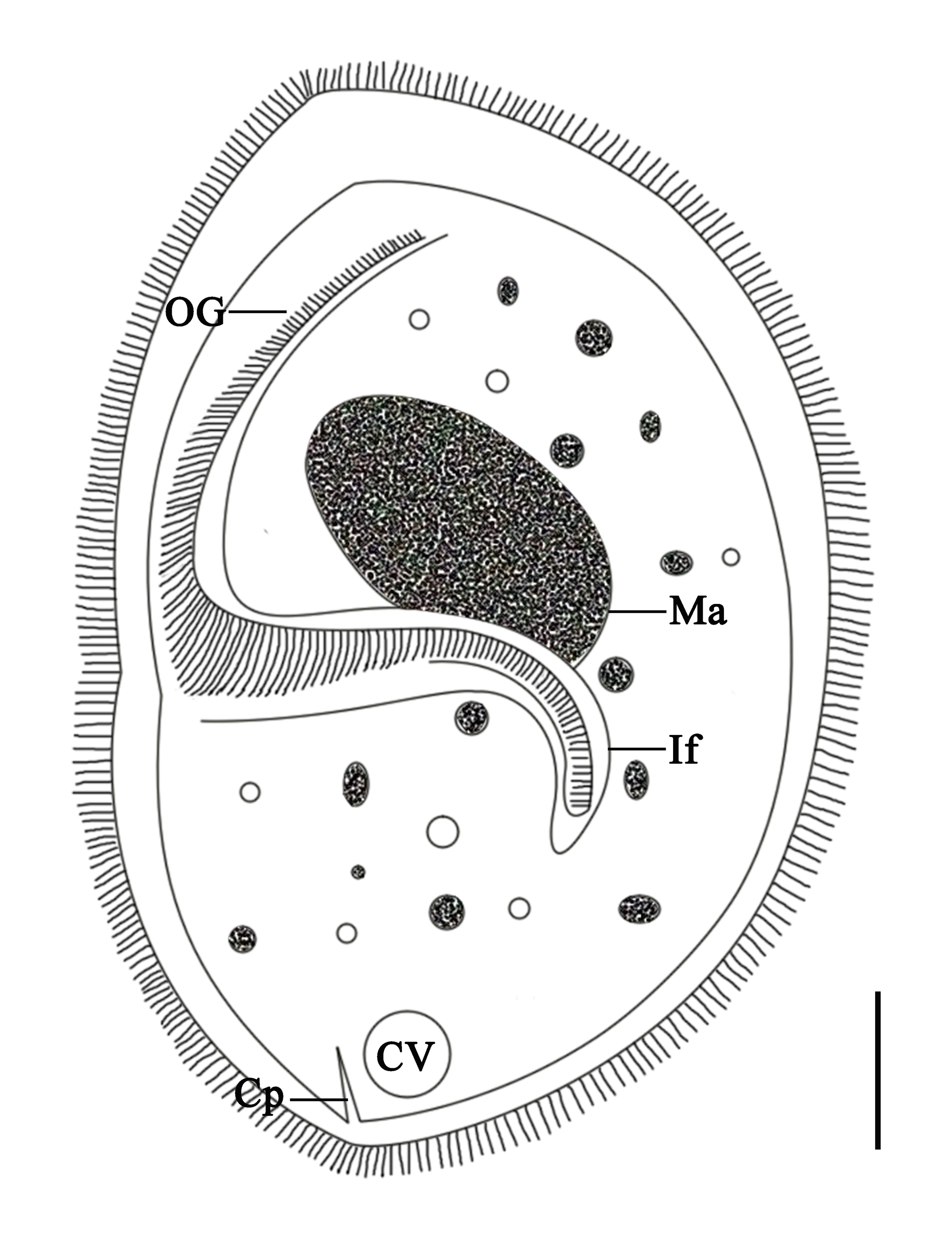
Sicuophora multigranularis (Armophorea), a parasite of the rectum of Quasipaa spinosa

Parasites of Quasipaa spinosa include the ciliate Sicuophora multigranularis.
