= Mui Tsz Lam (North District) =

Hakka village in Hong Kong

Coordinates: 22.518589°N 114.256252°E

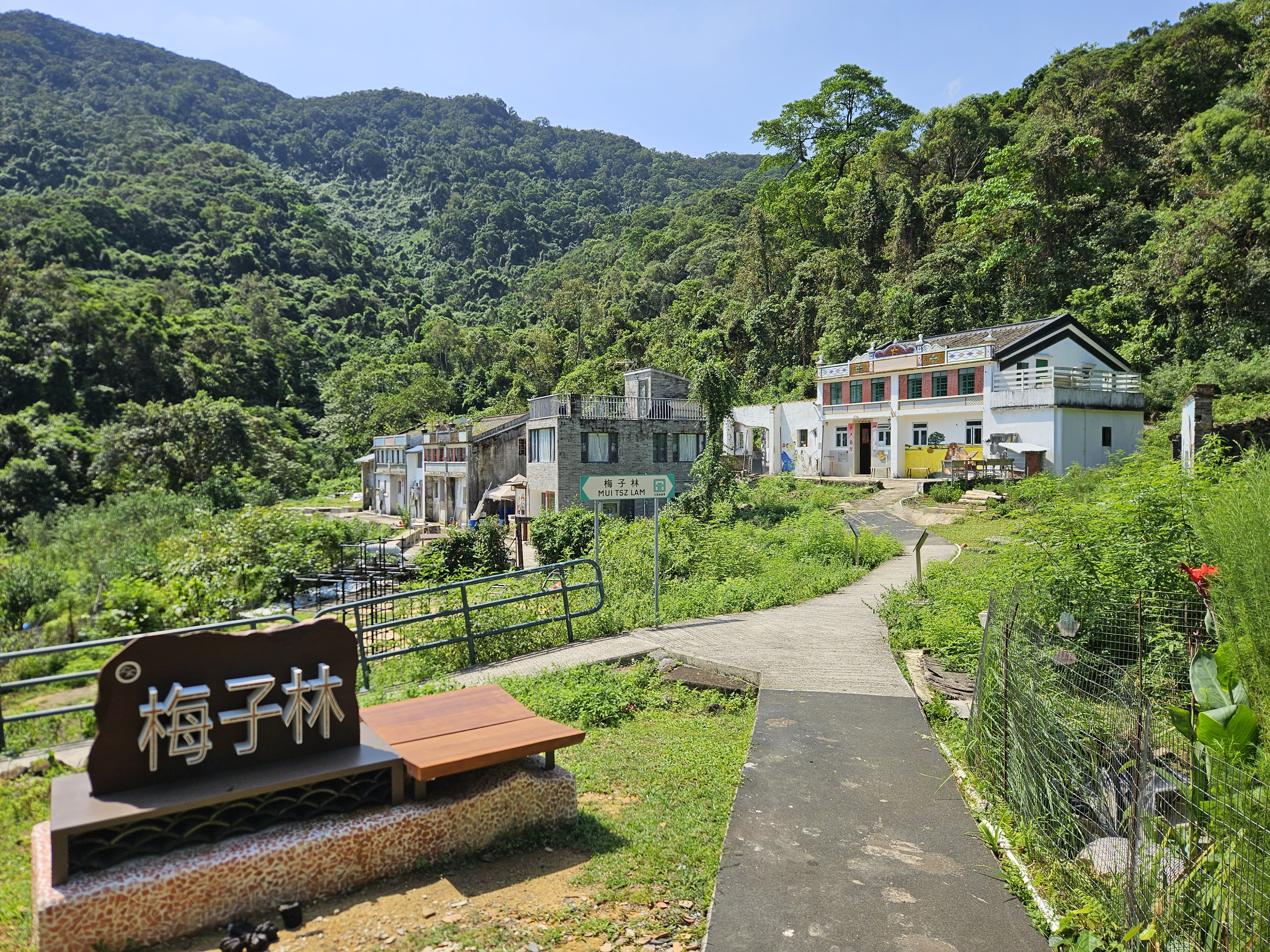
Mui Tsz Lam in October 2025

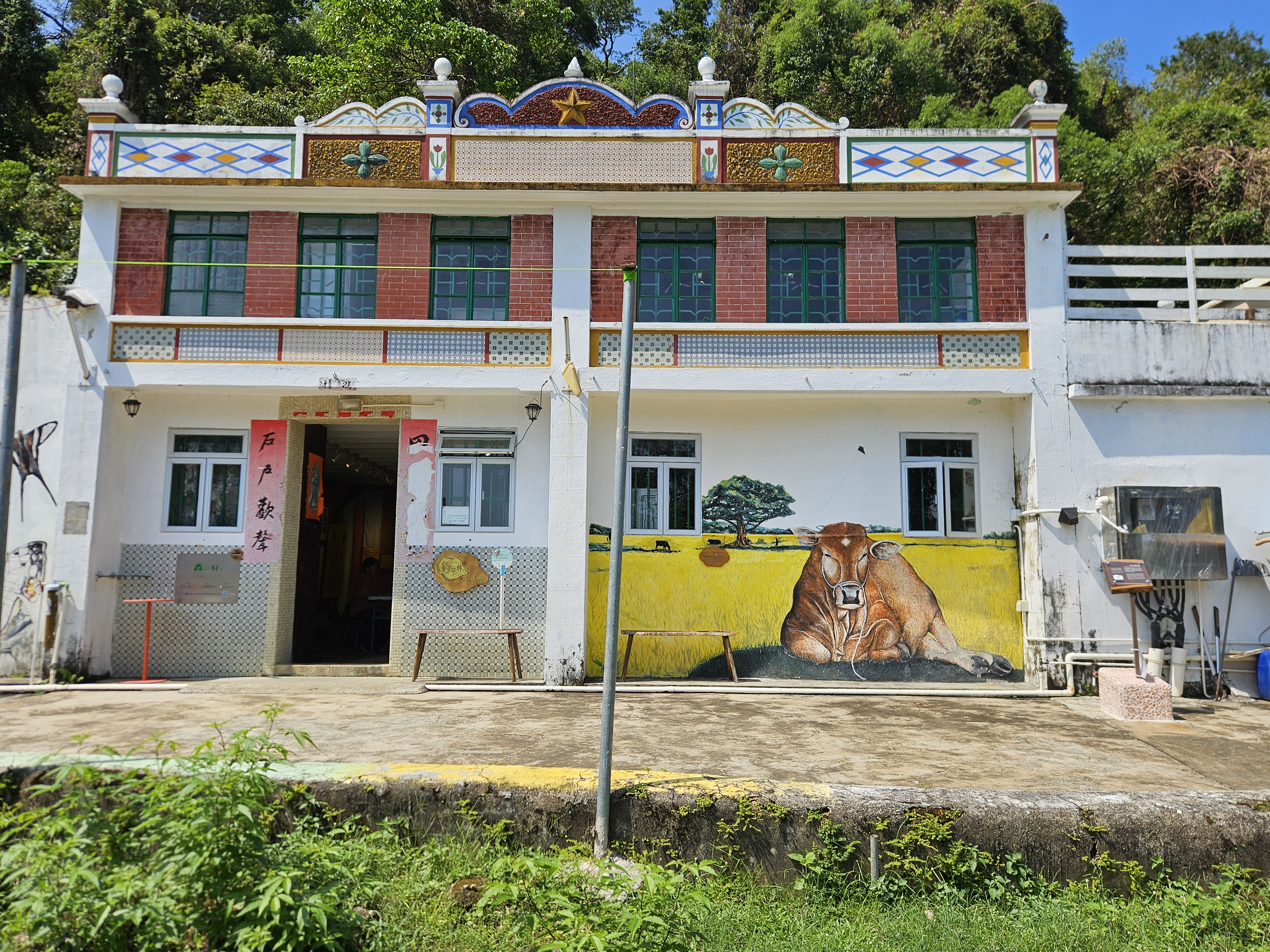
Houses in Mui Tsz Lam in 2025

Mui Tsz Lam (Chinese: 梅子林) is an upland Hakka village in the North District, in the northeastern part of the New Territories of Hong Kong.

== Administration ==
Mui Tsz Lam is a recognized village under the New Territories Small House Policy.

== History ==
Mui Tsz Lam is over 300 years old. It is one of the seven Hakka villages of the Hing Chun Yeuk (慶春約; 'Hing Chun Alliance'), which comprises Kop Tong, Lai Chi Wo, Mui Tsz Lam, Ngau Shi Wu, Sam A Village, Siu Tan (小灘), and So Lo Pun.

Mui Tsz Lam was abandoned in the 1970s. The village has been the focus of conservation and revitalization projects in the late 2010s and early 2020s, with the village being reconnected to the electricity grid in 2021.

== Flora and fauna ==
The villages of Mui Tsz Lam and Kop Tong are surrounded by dense woodland. The stream system at Lai Chi Wo, Mui Tsz Lam and Kop Tong provides habitats for three amphibian species of conservation concern: Chinese Bullfrog Hoplobatrachus chinensis, Big-headed Frog Limnonectes fujianensis and Lesser Spiny Frog Paa exilispinosa. The fung shui woodlands at Mui Tsz Lam and Kop Tong support a diversity of plans, including Pavetta hongkongensis (香港大沙葉) and Aquilaria sinensis of conservation significance.

== Access ==
Mui Tsz Lam can be reached by foot from Lai Chi Wo. The walk takes about 30 minutes.
