= Kop Tong =

Hakka village in Hong Kong

Coordinates: 22.5169°N 114.2595°E

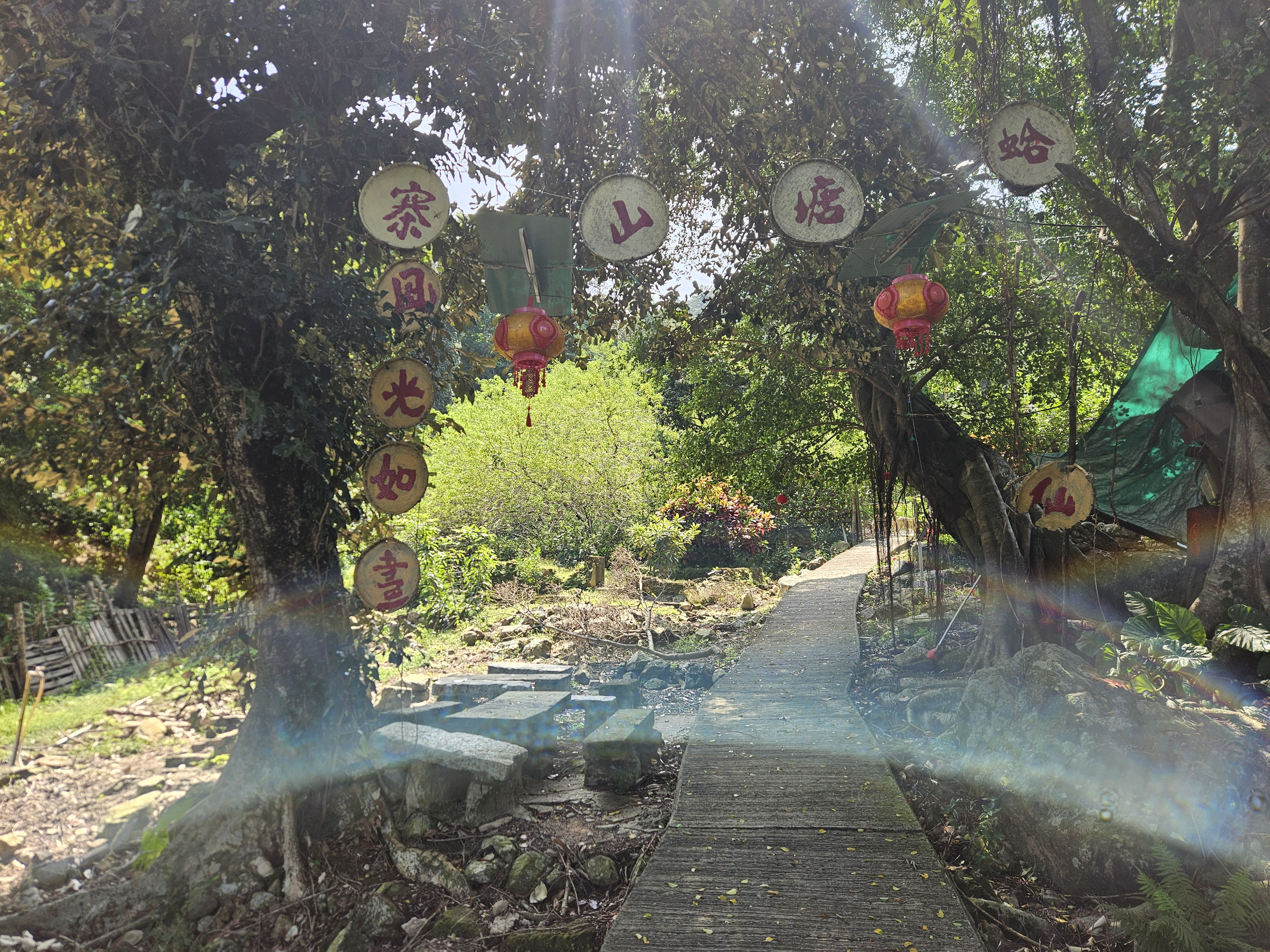
Kop Tong in October 2025

Kop Tong (Chinese: 蛤塘) is an upland Hakka village in the North District, in the northeastern part of the New Territories of Hong Kong.

== Administration ==
Kop Tong is a recognized village under the New Territories Small House Policy.

== History ==
Kop Tong is over 300 years old. It is one of the seven Hakka villages of the Hing Chun Yeuk (慶春約; 'Hing Chun Alliance'), which comprises Kop Tong, Lai Chi Wo, Mui Tsz Lam, Ngau Shi Wu, Sam A Village, Siu Tan (小灘), and So Lo Pun.

The village has been the focus of conservation and revitalization projects in the early 2020s.

== Flora and fauna ==
The villages of Mui Tsz Lam and Kop Tong are surrounded by dense woodland. The stream system at Lai Chi Wo, Mui Tsz Lam and Kop Tong provides habitats for three amphibian species of conservation concern: Chinese Bullfrog Hoplobatrachus chinensis, Big-headed Frog Limnonectes fujianensis and Lesser Spiny Frog Paa exilispinosa. The fung shui woodlands at Mui Tsz Lam and Kop Tong support a diversity of plans, including Pavetta hongkongensis (香港大沙葉) and Aquilaria sinensis of conservation significance.
