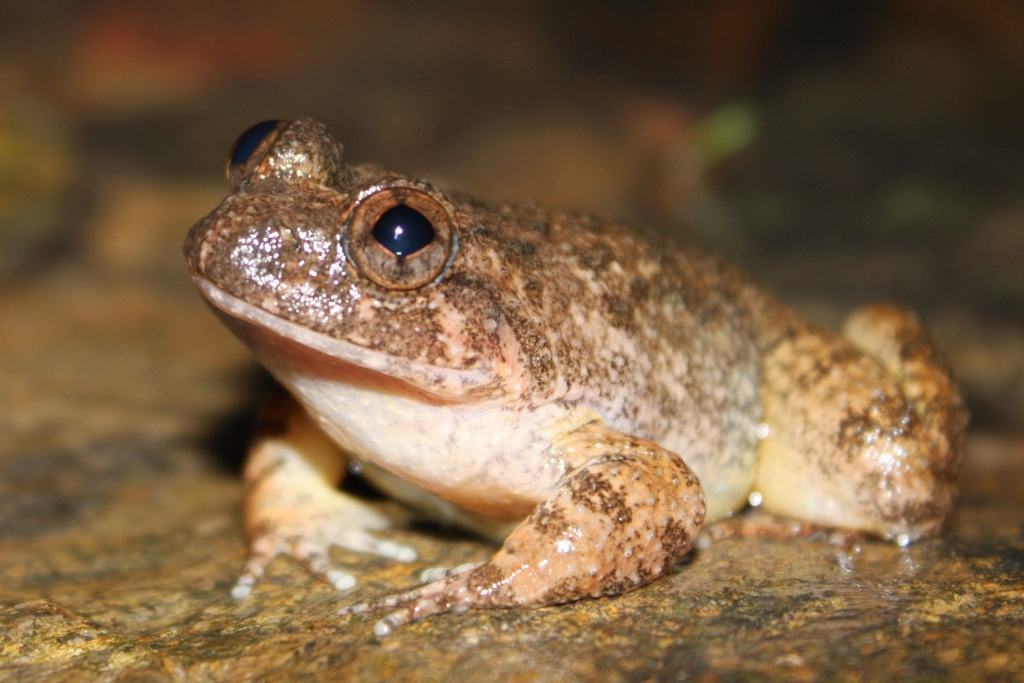
- Quasipaa exilispinosa

Scientific classification
- Kingdom: Animalia
- Phylum: Chordata
- Class: Amphibia
- Order: Anura
- Family: Dicroglossidae
- Subfamily: Dicroglossinae
- Genus: Quasipaa; Dubois, 1992

Type species
- Rana boulengeri Günther, 1889

= Quasipaa =

Genus of amphibians

Quasipaa is a genus of frogs in the family Dicroglossidae. The genus has no established common name, but many individual species are referred to as spiny frogs. They occur in East and Southeast Asia, from Thailand and Cambodia to southern and eastern China.

== Taxonomy ==
Quasipaa was first proposed as a subgenus of Paa (now considered to belong to Nanorana). It was subsequently raised to the level of genus, and molecular phylogenetic analyses have corroborated the monophyly of Quasipaa.

Many individual species were originally described in genus Rana. Even after splitting the very wide Rana into smaller taxa, frogs now in Quasipaa continued to belong to the true frog family (Ranidae), at times as subfamily Dicroglossinae, until Dicroglossinae was raised to the family level (i.e., Dicroglossidae). The taxonomy of Dicroglossidae is far from settled yet.

== Species ==
There are 11 species in this genus:

- Quasipaa acanthophora Dubois and Ohler, 2009
- Quasipaa boulengeri (Günther, 1889)
- Quasipaa courtoisi (Angel, 1922)
- Quasipaa delacouri (Angel, 1928)
- Quasipaa exilispinosa (Liu and Hu, 1975)
- Quasipaa fasciculispina (Inger, 1970)
- Quasipaa jiulongensis (Huang and Liu, 1985)
- Quasipaa shini (Ahl, 1930)
- Quasipaa spinosa (David, 1875)
- Quasipaa verrucospinosa (Bourret, 1937)
- Quasipaa yei (Chen, Qu, and Jiang, 2002)

== Conservation and use ==
The International Union for Conservation of Nature (IUCN) has assessed ten species of Quasipaa. One of them is "Data deficient", another one "Near threatened, and the remaining ones are either "Vulnerable" or "Endangered". Quasipaa can be relatively large frogs, and many are collected for consumption. They are also threatened by habitat loss.
