= Tonkin Asian frog =

Conservation status
- Least Concern (IUCN 3.1)

Scientific classification
- Kingdom: Animalia
- Phylum: Chordata
- Class: Amphibia
- Order: Anura
- Family: Dicroglossidae
- Genus: Quasipaa
- Species: Q. delacouri

Binomial name
- Quasipaa delacouri (Angel, 1928)

Synonyms
- Chaparana delacouri (Angel, 1928); Annandia delacouri (Angel, 1928); Rana microlineata Bourret, 1937; Paa microlineata (Bourret, 1937)

Species of amphibian

The Tonkin Asian frog (Quasipaa delacouri) is a species of frog in the family Dicroglossidae. Based on its known distribution, it is endemic to northern Vietnam, although it is considered likely that it also occurs in adjacent Laos and China. This poorly known species is presumed to be associated with small streams (its habitat in the Tam Đảo National Park). Possible threats include collection for human consumption and habitat loss.
