= Ngau Shi Wu =

Village in Hong Kong

Coordinates: 22.521039°N 114.276049°E

Ngau Shi Wu (Chinese: 牛屎湖; lit. 'cow turd lake') is a village in the North District of Hong Kong.

== Administration ==
Ngau Shi Wu is a recognized village under the New Territories Small House Policy.

== History ==
Ngau Shi Wu is one of the seven Hakka villages of the Hing Chun Yeuk (慶春約; 'Hing Chun Alliance'), which comprises Kop Tong, Lai Chi Wo, Mui Tsz Lam, Ngau Shi Wu, Sam A Village, Siu Tan (小灘), and So Lo Pun.

== Features ==
The Sai Lau Kong Fish Culture Zone (西流江魚類養殖區), one of the 26 designated marine fish culture zones in Hong Kong, is located in Ngau Shi Wu Wan (牛屎湖灣), a bay northeast of Ngau Shi Wu.
