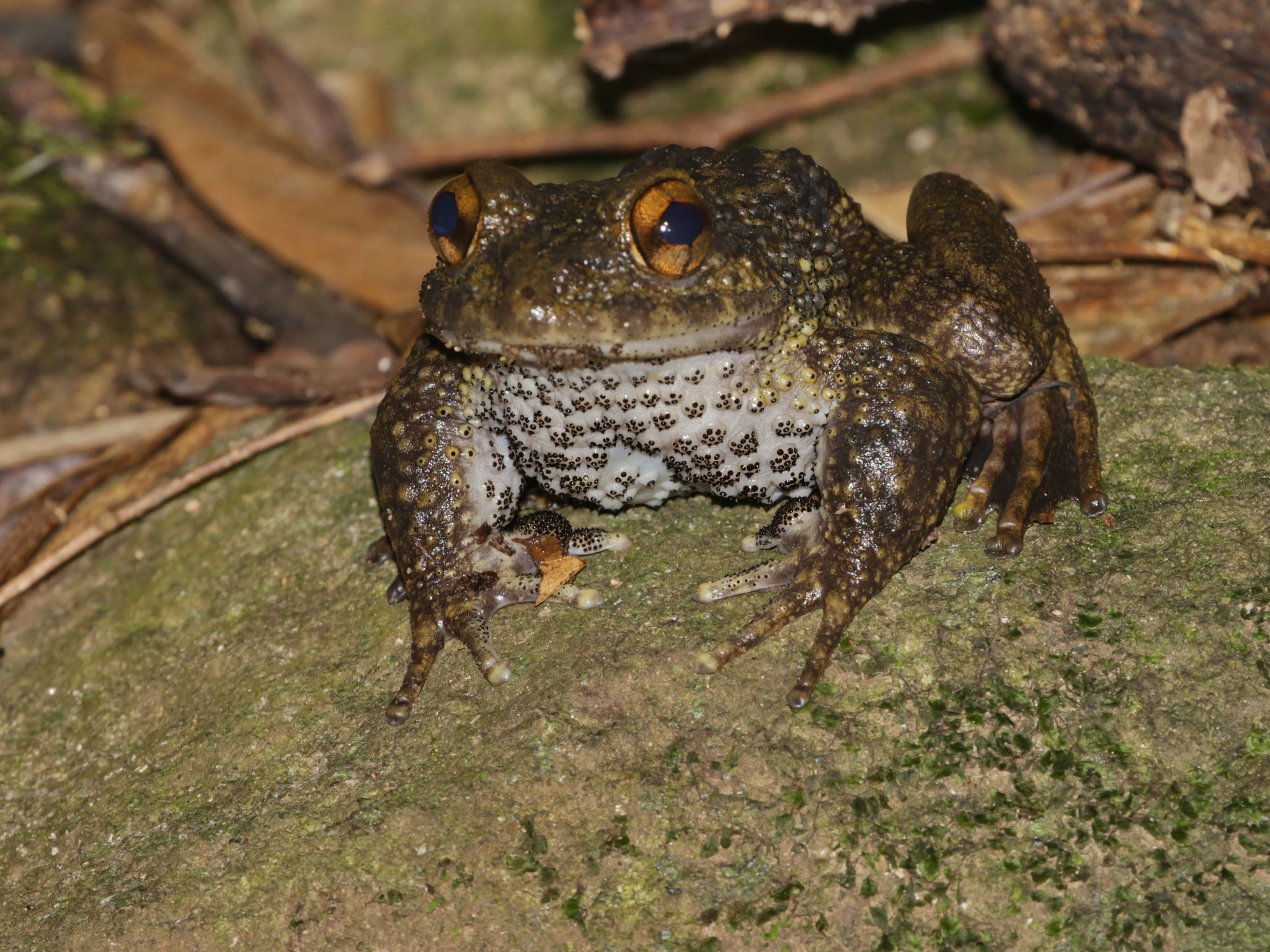

Conservation status
- Least Concern (IUCN 3.1)

Scientific classification
- Kingdom: Animalia
- Phylum: Chordata
- Class: Amphibia
- Order: Anura
- Family: Dicroglossidae
- Genus: Quasipaa
- Species: Q. fasciculispina

Binomial name
- Quasipaa fasciculispina (Inger, 1970)

Synonyms
- Rana fasciculispina Inger, 1970; Paa fasciculispina (Inger, 1970)

= Quasipaa fasciculispina =

Species of amphibian

Quasipaa fasciculispina is a species of frog in the family Dicroglossidae. It is known under many common names: spiny-breasted giant frog, spiny-breasted frog, spine-glanded mountain frog, and Thai paa frog. It is found in the Cardamom Mountains in southwestern Cambodia and eastern Thailand. It is found in on near fast-flowing mountain streams in tropical evergreen forests. It is threatened by collecting for human consumption and by habitat loss.
