= Miu Tin =

Village in Hong Kong

Miu Tin 苗田
- Village
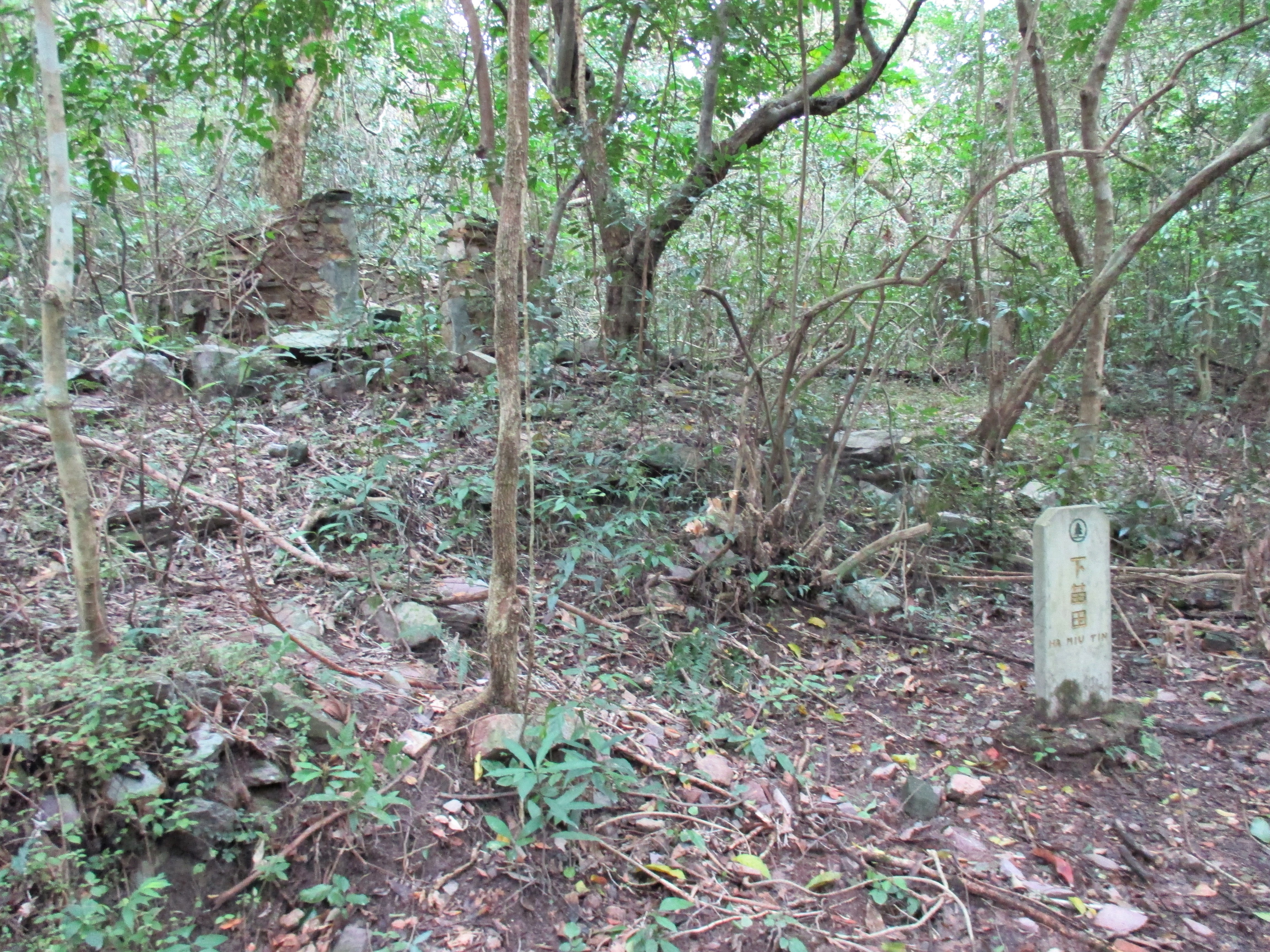
- Ha Miu Tin location marker and village ruins
- Interactive map of Miu Tin
- Coordinates: 22°30′09″N 114°15′31″E
- Country: China
- SAR: Hong Kong
- District: North District
- Region: New Territories

Miu Tin (Chinese: 苗田) (Hakka pronunciation: Mèu-thièn) is a village in the North District, in the northwestern New Territories of Hong Kong. The village consists of Sheung Miu Tin (上苗田; 'Upper Miu Tin') and Ha Miu Tin (下苗田; 'Lower Miu Tin').

Sheung Miu Tin and Ha Miu Tin are recognized villages under the New Territories Small House Policy.

== Gallery ==
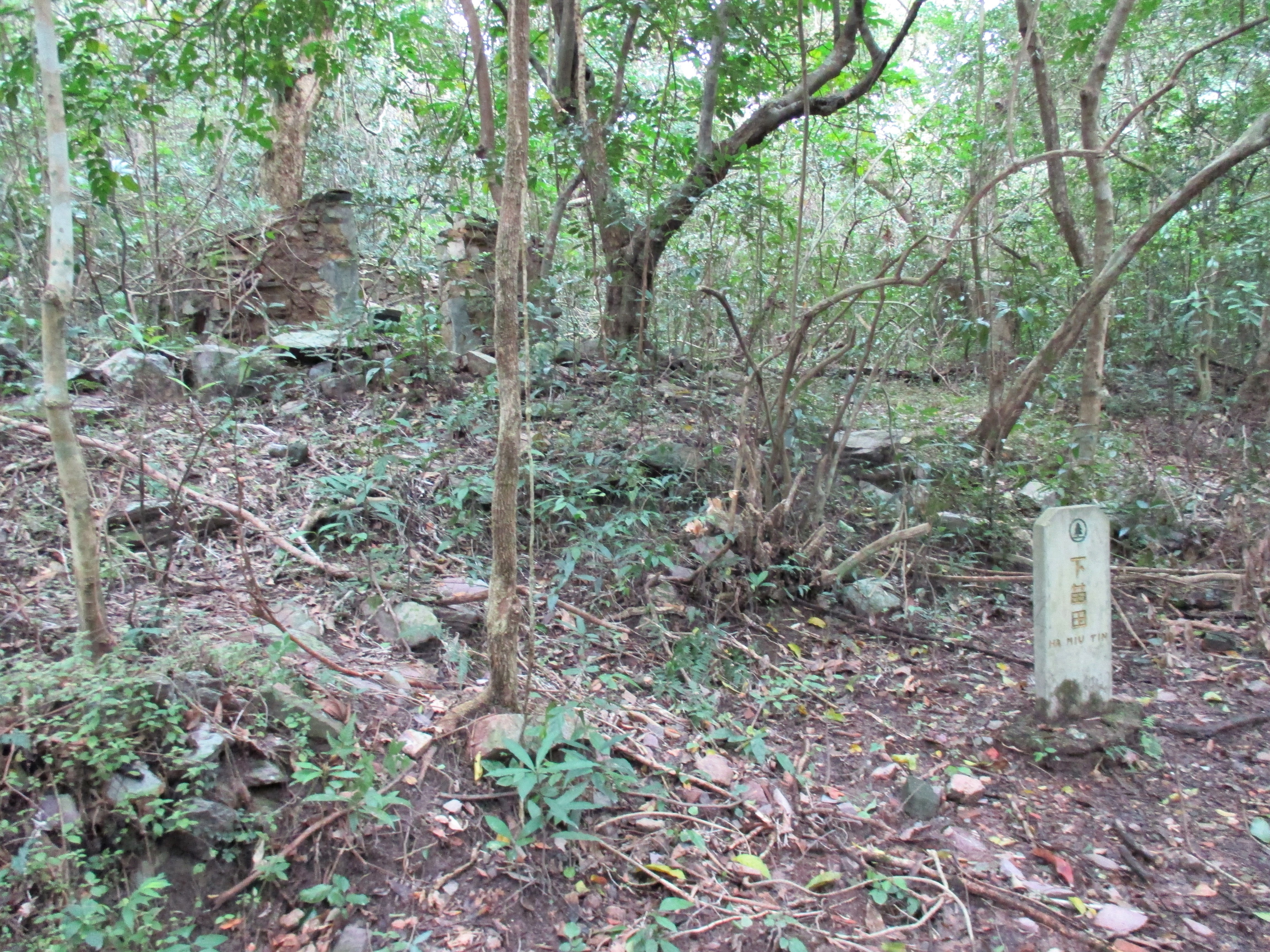
Ha Miu Tin location marker and village ruins

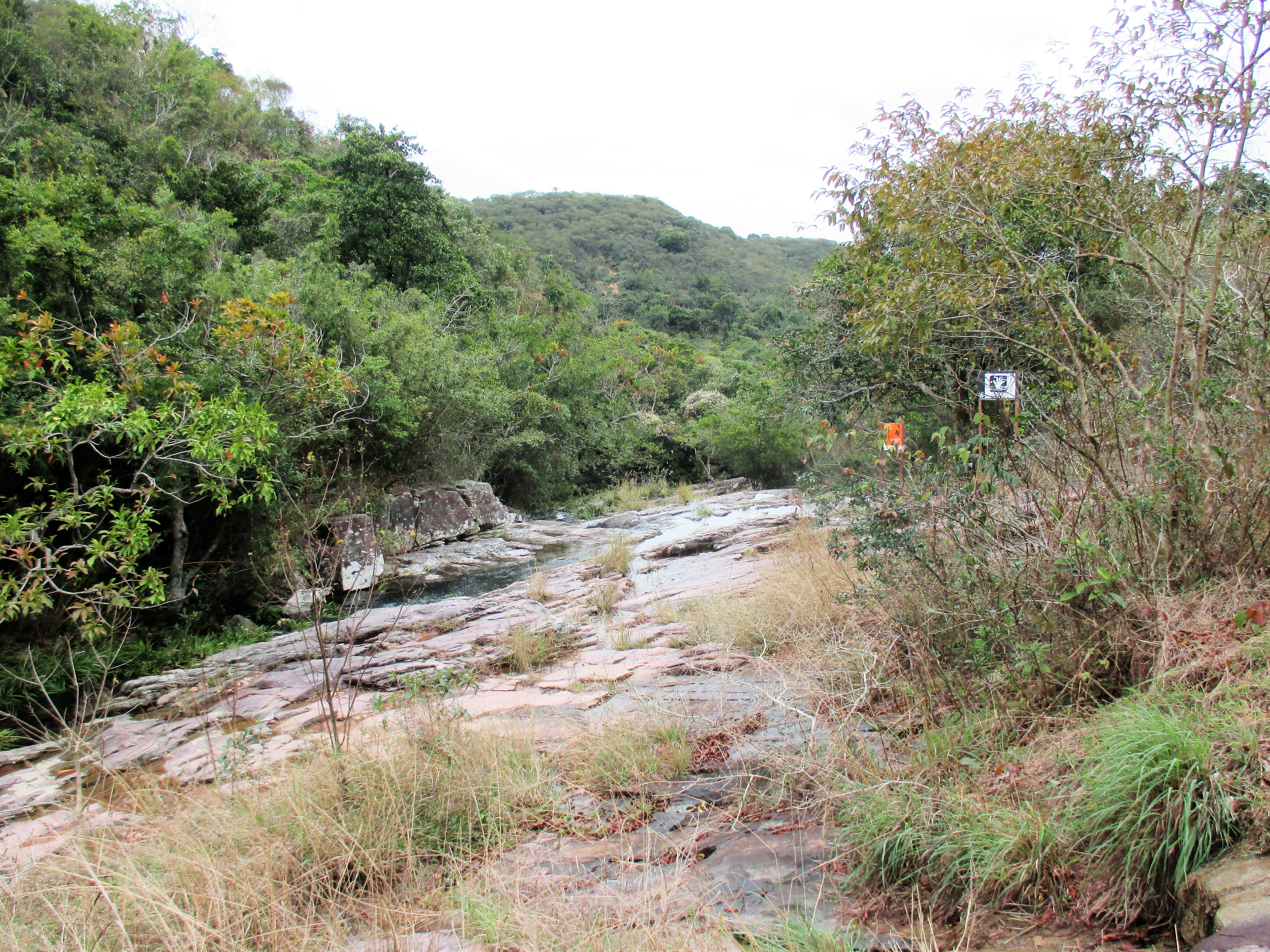
Brook near Miu Tin

== See also ==
- Lai Chi Wo
