= Quasipaa boulengeri =

Conservation status
- Vulnerable (IUCN 3.1)

Scientific classification
- Kingdom: Animalia
- Phylum: Chordata
- Class: Amphibia
- Order: Anura
- Family: Dicroglossidae
- Genus: Quasipaa
- Species: Q. boulengeri

Binomial name
- Quasipaa boulengeri (Günther, 1889)

Synonyms
- Rana boulengeri Günther, 1889; Paa boulengeri (Günther, 1889); Rana robertingeri Wu and Zhao, 1995; Quasipaa robertingeri (Wu and Zhao, 1995)

Species of amphibian

Quasipaa boulengeri is a species of frog in the family Dicroglossidae. It is known under many common names, including Boulenger's spiny frog, spiny-bellied frog, and Boulenger's paa frog. It is found in southern and southwestern China and northern Vietnam. It is a very common species that has declined. It is collected for human consumption, and it is also threatened by habitat loss. Its natural habitats are hill streams and ponds.

Quasipaa boulengeri are relatively large frogs: males grow to a snout–vent length of about 90 mm (3.5 in) and females to 98 mm (3.9 in). Tadpoles are up to about 52 mm (2.0 in) in length.
