= Quasipaa acanthophora =

Conservation status
- Vulnerable (IUCN 3.1)

Scientific classification
- Kingdom: Animalia
- Phylum: Chordata
- Class: Amphibia
- Order: Anura
- Family: Dicroglossidae
- Genus: Quasipaa
- Species: Q. acanthophora

Binomial name
- Quasipaa acanthophora Dubois and Ohler, 2009

Species of amphibian

Quasipaa acanthophora is a species of frog in the family Dicroglossidae. It is endemic to northern Vietnam and know from two locations, its type locality Mau Son in the Lang Son Province, and the Tay Yen Tu Nature Reserve in the Bac Giang Province. It is a sibling species of Quasipaa spinosa.

== Description ==
Adult males in the type series measured 61–102 mm (2.4–4.0 in) and the sole adult female 81 mm (3.2 in) in snout–vent length (SVL); two females from the Tay Yen Tu Nature Reserve measured 87 and 90 mm (3.4 and 3.5 in) SVL. The head is rather large and wider than it is long. The snout is rounded and slightly protruding. The canthus rostralis is indistinct, as is the tympanum, but the supratympanic fold is prominent. The fingers and toes have no discs, but the toes are fully webbed. Skin on the dorsum is shagreened and has regularly disposed glandular warts. In living specimens, the dorsum is light brown and has grey spots. The supratympanic fold is darker, and the lips bear vertical bars. The limbs have transverse bars on the dorsal surface. The ventrum is yellowish white, and the gular region has black marbling. Males have enlarged forearms and black nuptial spines on prepollex, fingers I–III, and chest.

== Habitat and conservation ==
The ecology of this species is poorly known. The species description was primarily based on specimens collected by René Léon Bourret in 1930s and two additional, older specimens, and no ecological information accompany it. In Tay Yen Tu the species was associated with streams at elevations of 300–500 m (980–1,640 ft) above sea level; the specimens were found sitting on stones. Both known populations occur in mountainous and relatively forested areas, and the upper elevational limit is estimated at 1,220 m (4,000 ft). However, expanding human settlements, agriculture, and harvesting (though this species in particular has not been reported as being targeted) are likely threats. One of the populations occurs in a protected area.
