= Sam A =

Village in Hong Kong

Coordinates: 22.5162°N 114.2702°E

- Traditional Chinese: 三椏村
- Simplified Chinese: 三桠村
- Cantonese Yale: Sāam'āchyūn
Transcriptions
Standard Mandarin
- Hanyu Pinyin: Sānyācūn
- Wade–Giles: San^{1}-ya^{1}-ts‘un^{1}
- IPA: [sán.já.tsʰwə́n]
Yue: Cantonese
- Yale Romanization: Sāam'āchyūn
- Jyutping: saam1 aa1 cyun1
- IPA: [sam˥.a˥.tsʰyn˥]

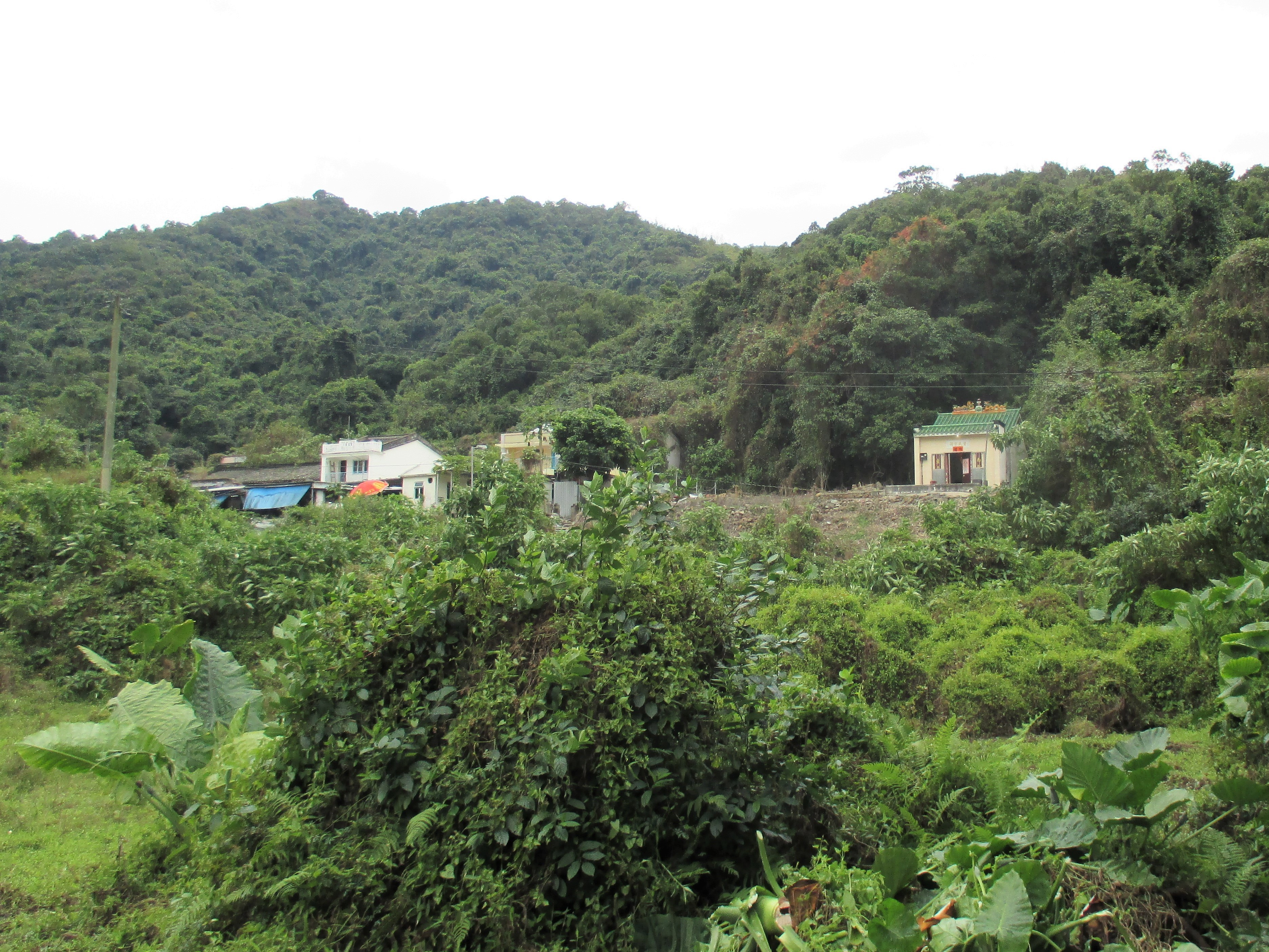
Sam A Tsuen, with the Tsang ancestral hall on the right

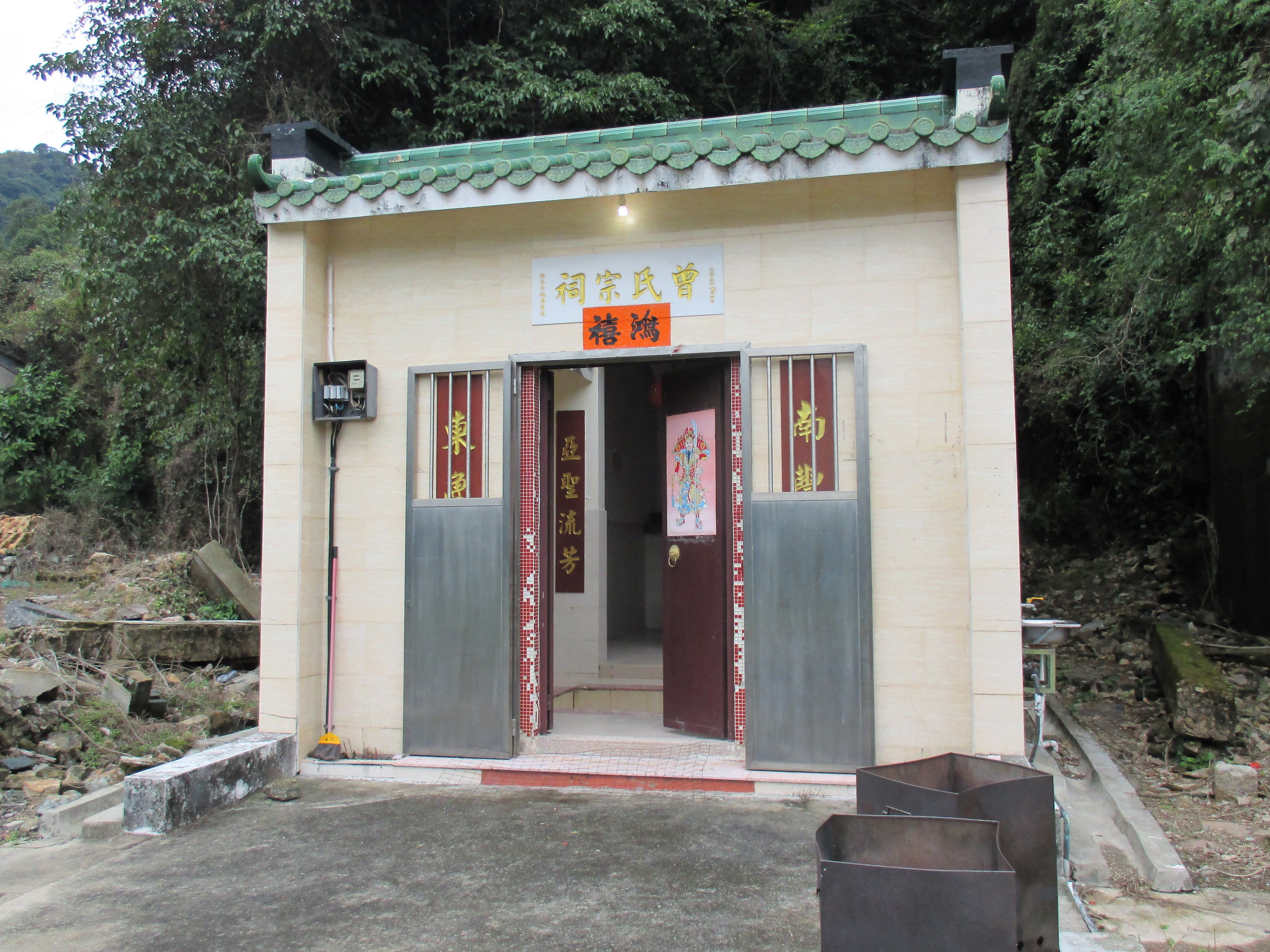
Tsang Ancestral Hall in Sam A Tsuen

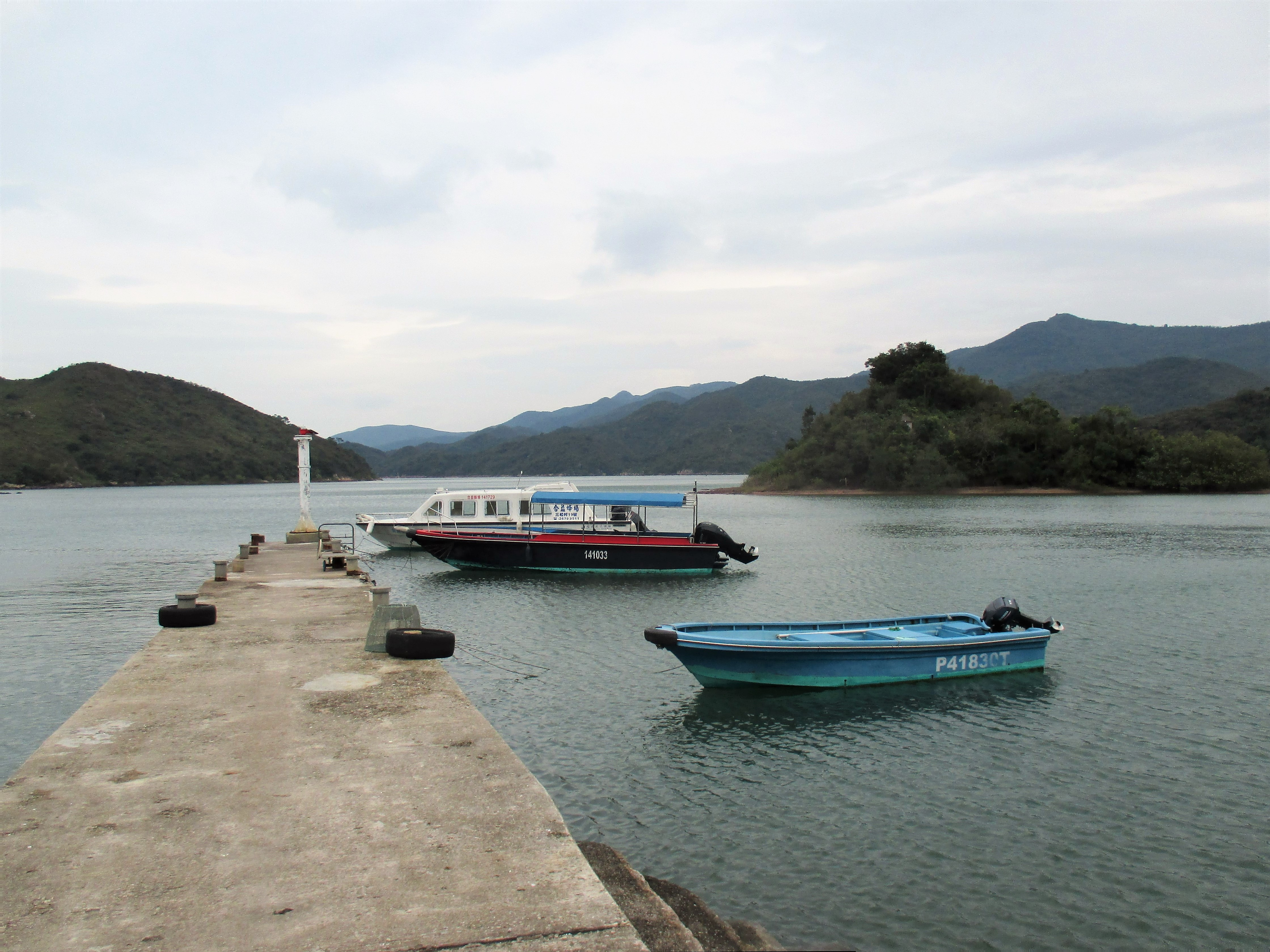
Sam A Wan, a bay next to Sam A Tsuen

Sam A (Chinese: 三椏村) is a village in the northeastern New Territories of Hong Kong, named after the bay of Sam A Wan (三椏灣).

== Administration ==
Sam A is a recognized village under the New Territories Small House Policy.

== History ==
The Tsang (曾) of Sam A have the same ancestor with the Tsang of Ma Tseuk Leng Sheung and Lai Chi Wo.

In its heyday in the 1950s and 1960s, there were more than 200 residents in the village, but at the end of the 1960s most of the men left the village to seek employment in the United Kingdom and the Netherlands.

Sam A is one of the seven Hakka villages of the Hing Chun Yeuk (慶春約; 'Hing Chun Alliance'), which comprises Kop Tong, Lai Chi Wo, Mui Tsz Lam, Ngau Shi Wu, Sam A, Siu Tan (小灘), and So Lo Pun.

== Features ==
Today, the Tsang ancestral hall and the abandoned three-village school still stand, but there is little life here on a week-day. On week-ends, however, some Tsang clan members return to their ancestral village to run a couple of stores that offer food and lodgings for the ever increasing number of visitors. Still, even today, Sam A is still only accessible by boat or on foot.

== See also ==
- List of villages in Hong Kong
- Lai Chi Wo
- Sha Tau Kok Public Pier
- Double Haven
