= Lai Chi Wo =

Village in Hong Kong

Coordinates: 22°31′37″N 114°15′34″E

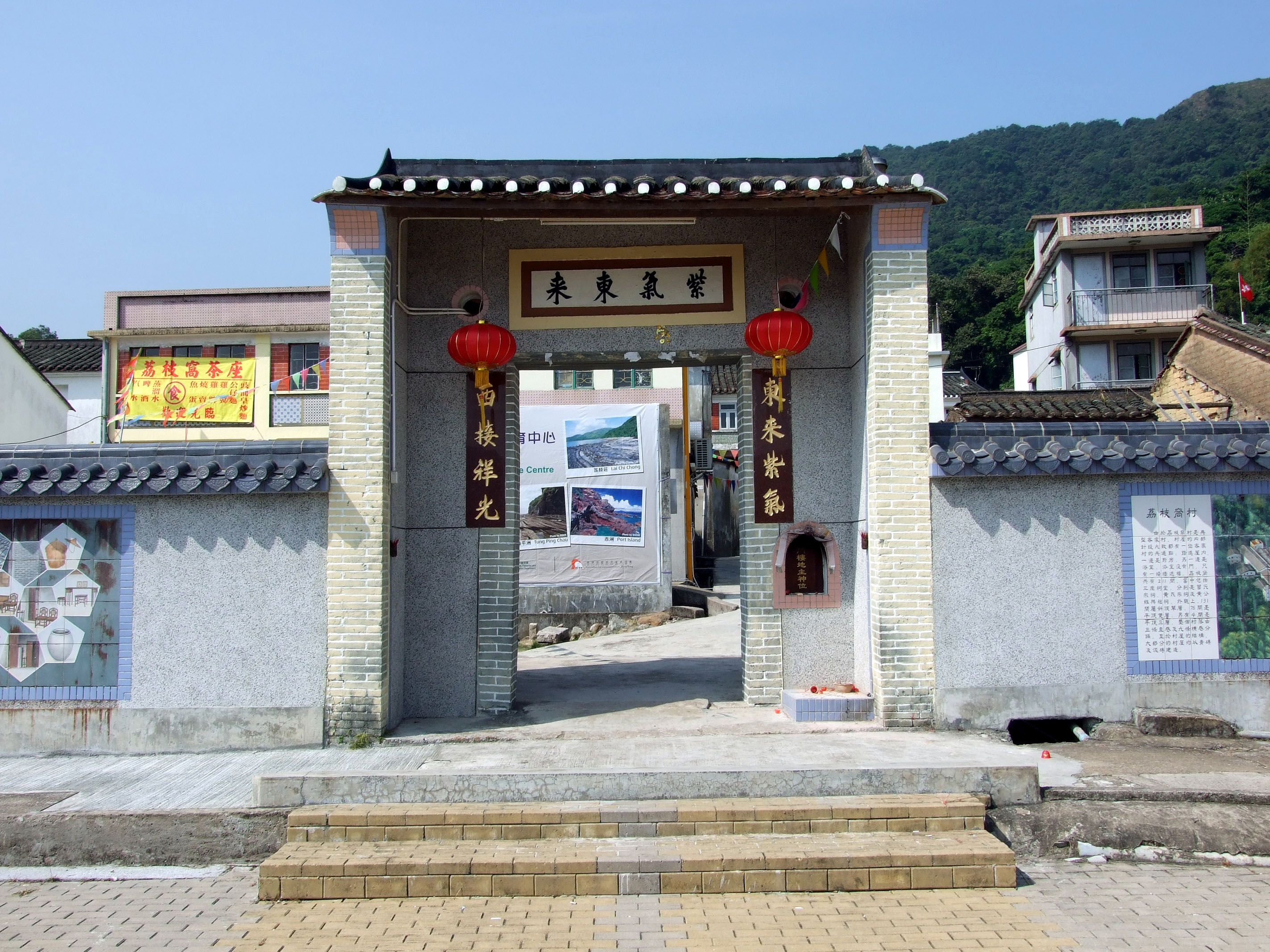
- East Gate of Lai Chi Wo

Chinese name
- Traditional Chinese: 荔枝窩
Transcriptions
Hakka
- Romanization: Lit zi wo
Yue: Cantonese
- Yale Romanization: Laih jī wō
- Jyutping: Lai^{6} zi^{1} wo^{1}

Lai Chi Wo is a Hakka village near Sha Tau Kok, in the northeastern New Territories of Hong Kong. It is described as a "walled village" by some sources. Lai Chi Wo is located within Plover Cove Country Park and near Yan Chau Tong Marine Park. Founded by the Tsang and Wong families who established Lai Chi Wo over 300 years ago. The Tsangs' ancestors migrated from Shandong, while a Wong ancestor was a military commander who fled the fall of the Ming Dynasty. These two Hakka clans built the village, though their descendants have since dispersed, with only a few families still residing there, often in urban areas or abroad. As a result of this outward migration, the majority of the current residents are from the Tsang family, with only a few Wongs remaining in the village today.

== Administration ==
Lai Chi Wo is a recognized village under the New Territories Small House Policy.

== History ==
The history of Lai Chi Wo dates back 400 years. It was once a prosperous Hakka walled-village in the northeastern part of New Territories. There were around 1000 residents in the most prosperous period. Some people are still living there today enjoying the village life. There is a restaurant inside the village next to the main gate serving good tofu fa and spam egg instant noodles which is enjoyable after a long hike to the village.

Around a hundred years ago, Lai Chi Wo was a poor village. At that time, a feng shui master suggested building 3 feng shui walls for the village to get rid of the evil spirits and keep the property inside the village safe. After setting up the three walls, the village regained its prosperity as before.

In recent years, most of the younger residents have moved out for a better living in nearby towns such as Fanling or Tai Po, or emigrated overseas to the UK, leaving the village with the older residents only. Some overseas based inhabitants have returned to connect with their ancestors village life. The original residents would, however, go back to the village whenever there are celebrations, like the Tai Ping Ching Chiu festival held once every 10 years. Many of the Tsang family members, have contributed to the refurbishment of the ancestor village and their names are recorded next to their donated amounts on a metal plaque at the village gate.

Lai Chi Wo is now the 16th special region inside Hong Kong. This special region was legalised in 2004 and enacted in 2005. Moreover, it has become one of the more popular hiking sites in Hong Kong. Hikers often start their route from either Wu Kau Tang near Tai Po or Luk Keng near Fanling. Hikers generally take Lai Chi Wo as a mid-way station.

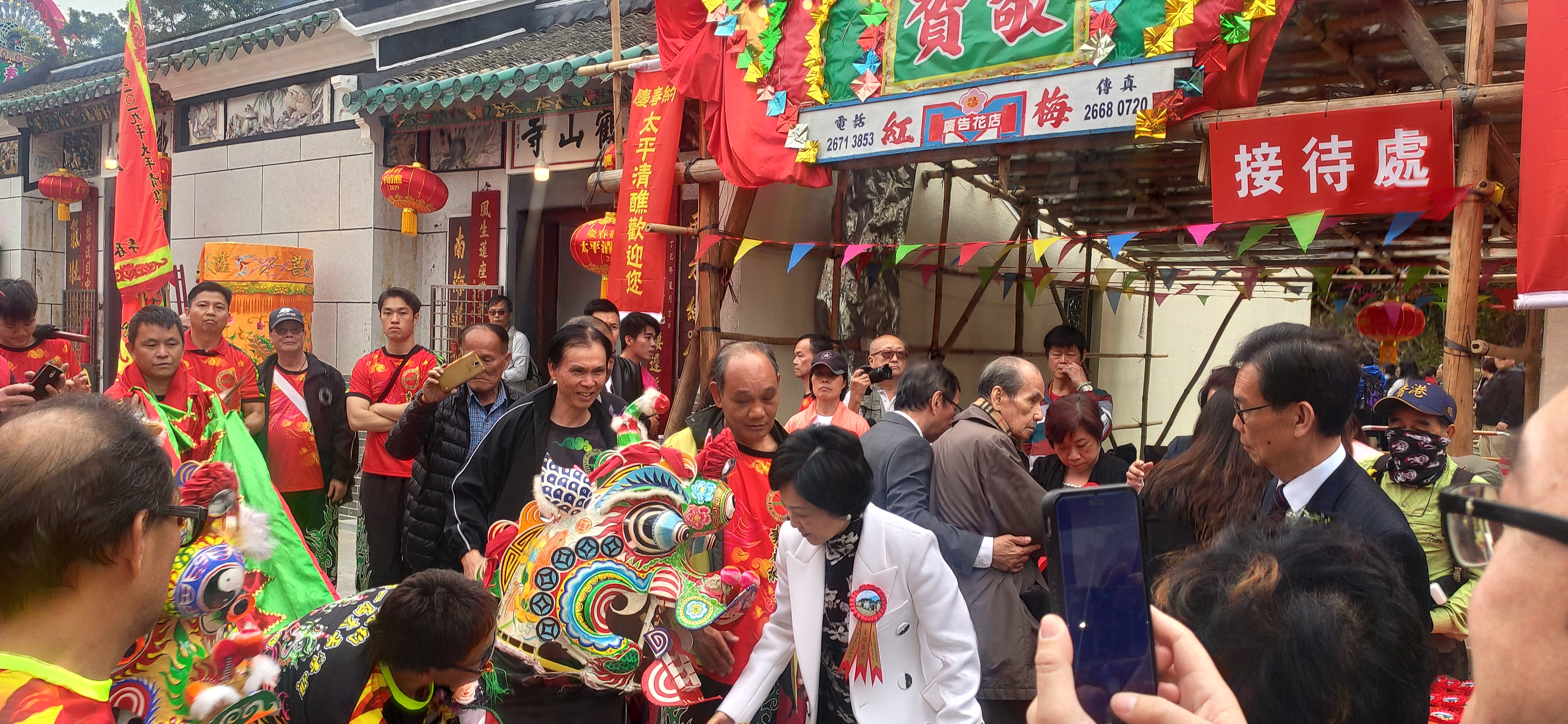
Tai Ping Ching Chiu 2019 at Lai Chi Wo Village

=== Name ===
As the name suggests, this area was once known for its lychee trees which were grown in the area. Lychee are old trees which take decades to yield fruit. In the 1960s and 1970s, the villagers found it more profitable to plant mandarins, which could fetch good prices during the Chinese New Year (as they are seen as auspicious). However, even the local villagers still cannot confirm if the village got the name because of the lychee trees or another reason.

== Location ==
Lai Chi Wo is situated inside the Plover Cove Country Park and Yan Chau Tong Marine Park. The area is situated in the north-eastern part of New Territories, near Sha Tau Kok.

The altitude of Lai Chi Wo is about 10 metres. It is around 1 hectare of special region inside the area of Lai Chi Wo.

== Structure of the village ==
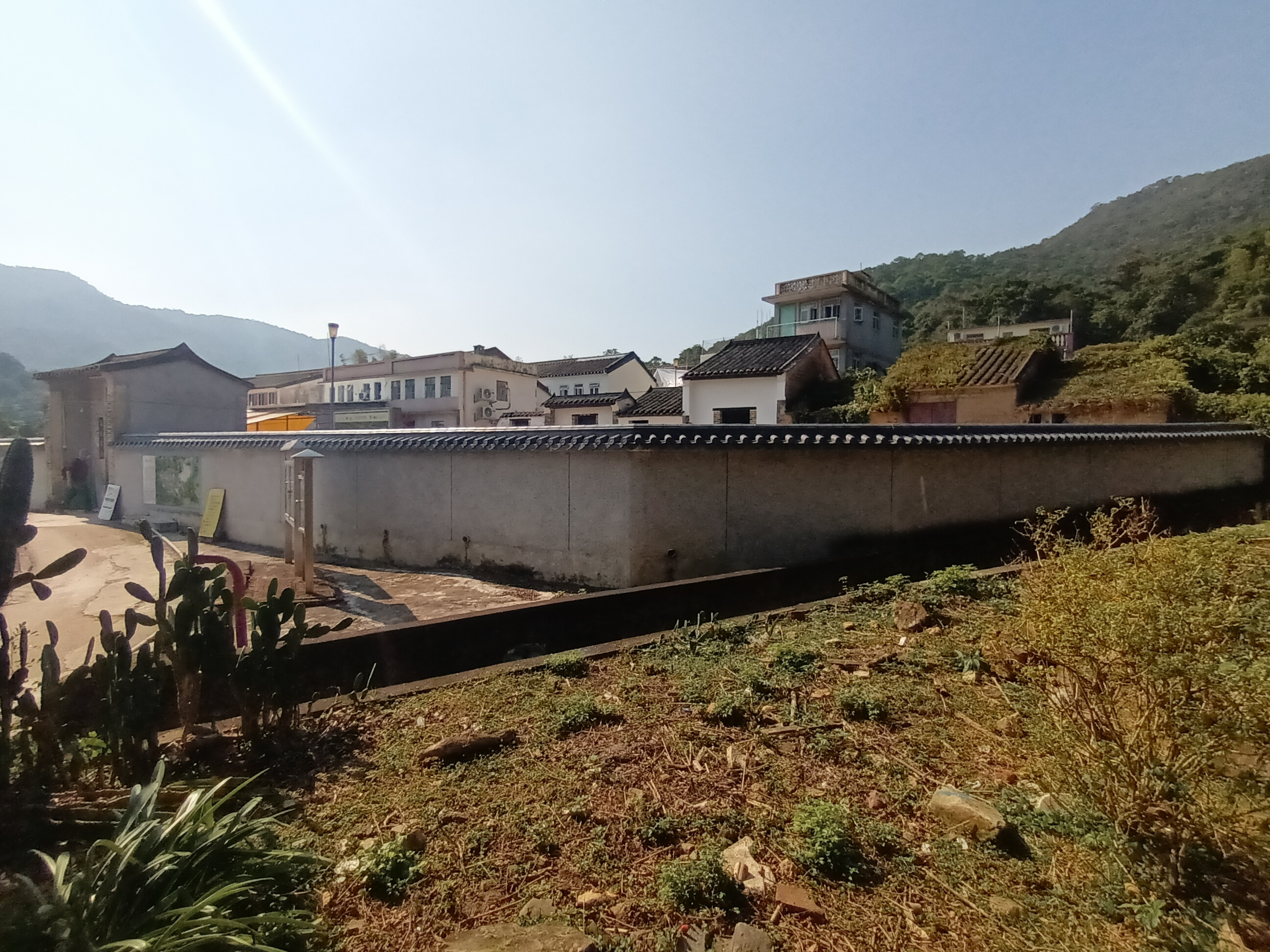
Wall of Lai Chi Wo Village

=== The buildings ===
Lai Chi Wo walled-village and the houses inside adapt the structure of a typical Hakka village. There are 211 houses in the village, including 3 ancestral halls (the Tsang's ancestral Hall, the Wong's ancestral Hall and the Wong's Weixing ancestral Hall). 131 of the houses are single-storey buildings. Another 76 are double-storey, and the remaining four three-storey buildings. The village is structured in 3 rows and 9 columns.

=== The residents ===
The inhabitants of Lai Chi Wo consist primarily of the Tsang and Wong Hakka families. Many families have either moved overseas or to other parts of Hong Kong. The ancestors of the Hakka residents of this village are claimed to have originated from Kaifeng, Henan around 2,500 years ago. The Wongs in Lai Chi Wo originate from Fujian, via Huizhou to Hong Kong during the early Qing dynasty. No one lives there except the occasional members of the Tsang family nowadays.

== Conservation ==
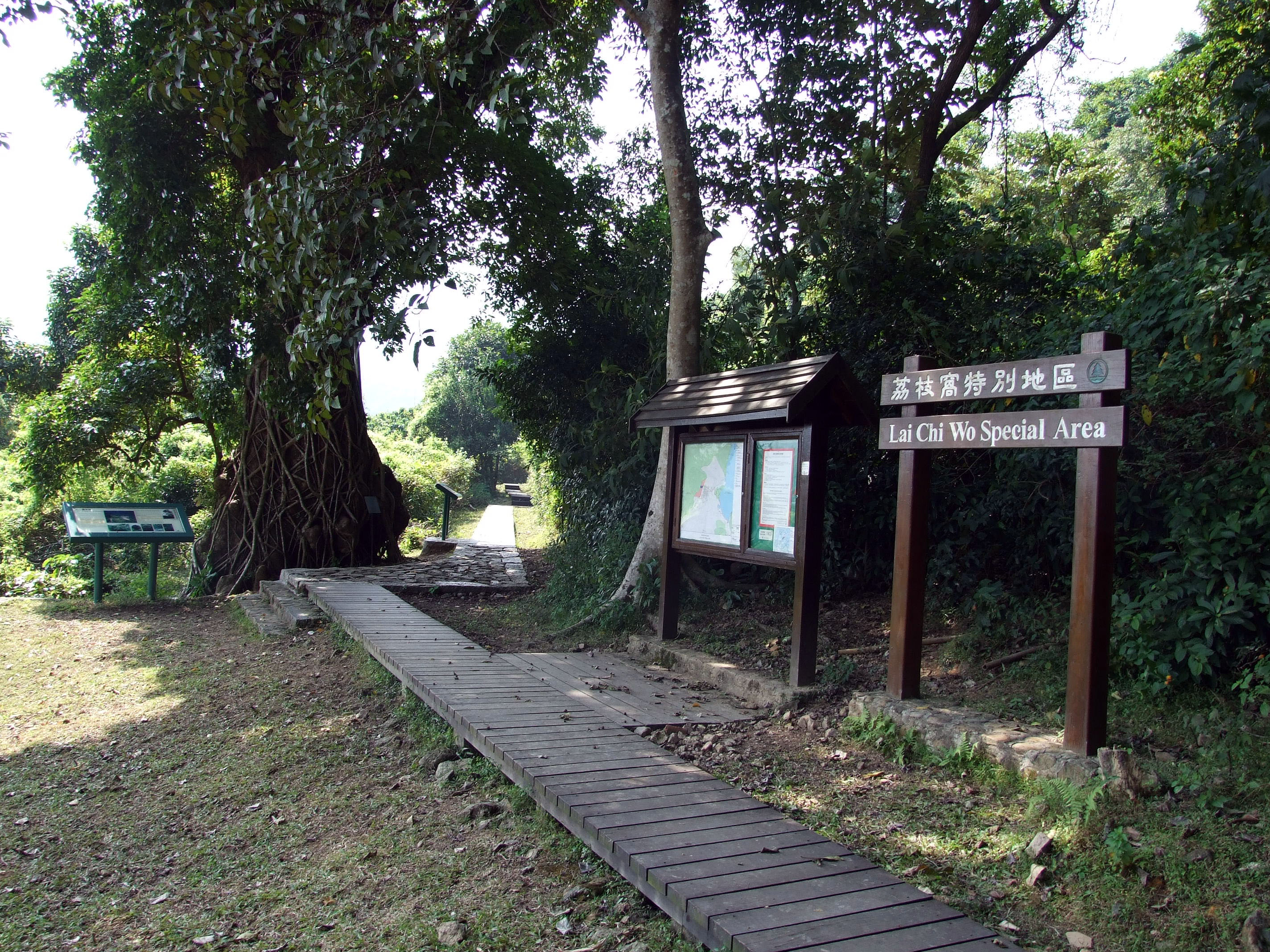
Lai Chi Wo Special Area

- Hip Tin Temple and Hok Shan Monastery (鶴山寺) in Lai Chi Wo are Grade III historic buildings.
- Lai Chi Wo is part of the Hong Kong UNESCO Global Geopark.
- The Lai Chi Wo Special Area was designated as a Special Area in 2005 and covers 1 hectare.
- The sand flat at Lai Chi Wo in Starling Inlet, covering an area of 11 hectares, was designated was designated as a Site of Special Scientific Interest in 1979 under the title "Lai Chi Wo Beach". It was the site of the first record of Zostera nana (Marine Eel Grass) in Hong Kong, in 1978.

== Cultural Sites ==
=== Fung shui woodland ===
Layout

Thought was given to the elements needed to provide good fung shui for the village. Accordingly, the village is embraced by mountains and hills at the back and on both sides. This is a "green barrier" for the village. Native trees and shrubs are crucial concern for the selection of the fung shui sites, and villagers would also plant vegetations of different values to be added in the forest. Following the development of the forest, a C-shaped like forest would encompass the village, forming a typical layout of fung shui setting of the village and fung shui woods.

Functions

Fung shui woods can protect and alleviate the impact of strong breeze and sun burn. During the time of heavy rainstorm, mudflow or landslide may happen. The natural barrier can help reduce the level of destructiveness by its retention capacity to stop the water and mudflow. Also, the dense broad-leaved trees are good resisters devoted to prevent hillfire from spreading. In economical terms, villagers grow the economic crops at the edge of the forest. It includes edible stuff and vegetation for medical purpose. They can be used as fuel wood or construction materials.

Natural conservation

Fung shui woods have the ability to stabilise the slopes as well as to avoid leakage of surface nutrients and organic substances after heavy downpour. Moreover, the physical landscape and natural habitat of Hong Kong can be preserved. Indeed, they act as a breeding ground for other fauna such as birds, bats, butterflies and mammals to thrive.

The Lai Chi Wo Fung Shui Wood

The fung shui wood still exists thanks to the effort of the villagers in the past to use every means to preserve it, such as limiting the number of days for fuel wood collection and imposing penalties for the damage of trees.

The 5–7 hectare fung shui wood comprises thick trees and shrubs. Most of them are 10–20 metres tall. We can see the great bio-diversity in Lai Chi Wo fung shui woods. For instance, we can find wild animals such as the Masked Palm Civet (Paguma larvata) and Chinese Porcupine (Hystrix brachyuran). Moreover, more than 100 plants have been recorded. Ordinary fung shui woods species like the Endospermum (Endospermum Chinese), Schima (Schima superb), Lance-leaved Sterculia (Sterculia lanceolata), Incense Tree (Ardisia quinquegona) can be seen. Other less common species like the Sampson Macaranga (Macaranga sampsonii), Lankok Fig (Ficus lankokensis) and Golden-leaved Tree (Chrysophyllum lanceolatum) have also been found.

=== Siu Ying School ===
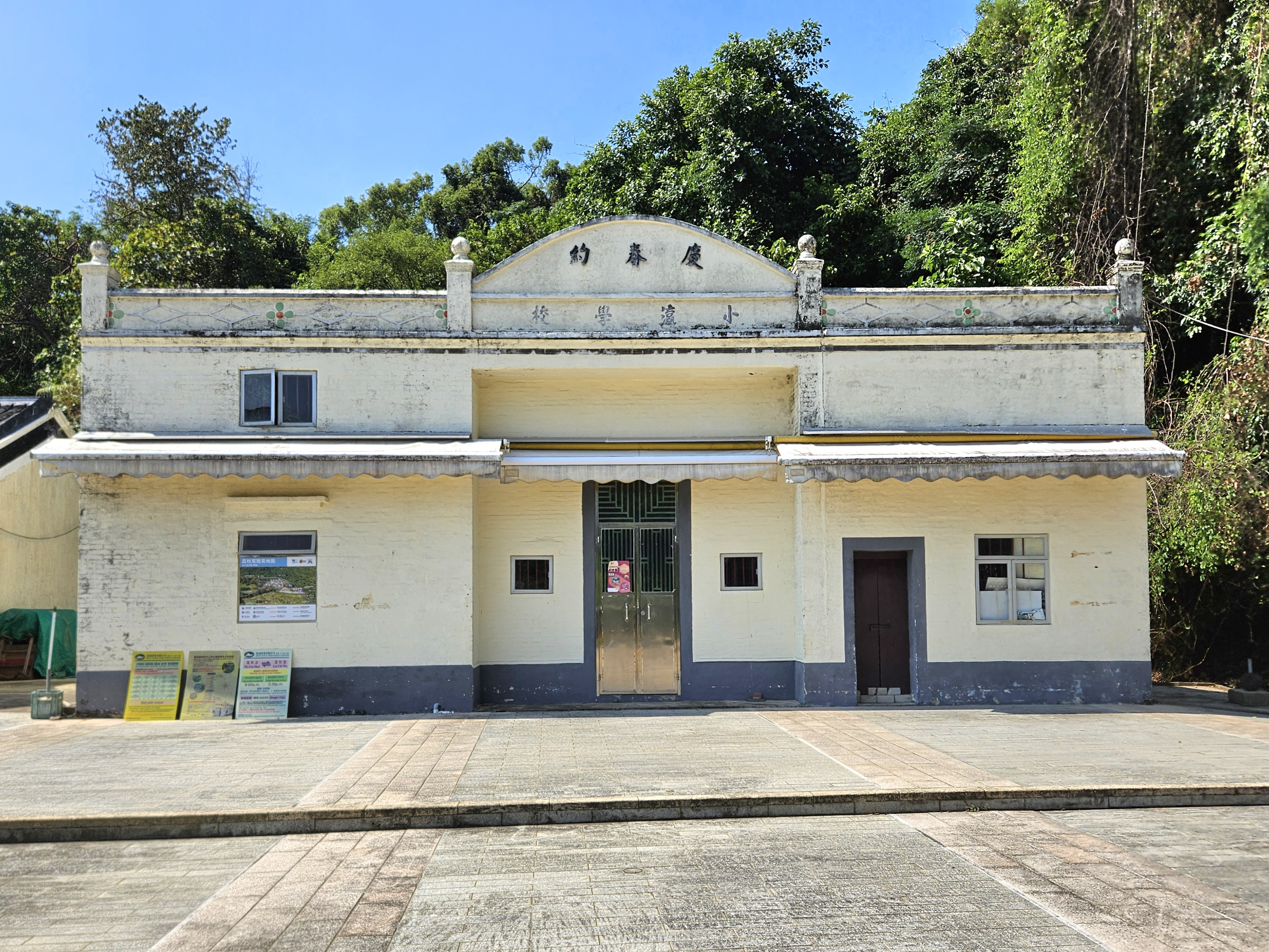
Former Siu Ying School in Lai Chi Wo

Siu Ying School (小瀛學校) has a long history. As there was no school in the other six villages, children of those seven villages went to this school to study. It closed in 1980. Then it had been left for many years. It will be converted to tourist centre in the forthcoming years. The objective of the centre is to let people know the importance of eco-awareness and preservation of environment, species, ecology, culture, learn about the natural environment, plants and animal species of Lai Chi Wo, experience the village culture in the New Territories.

=== Stone mills and well ===
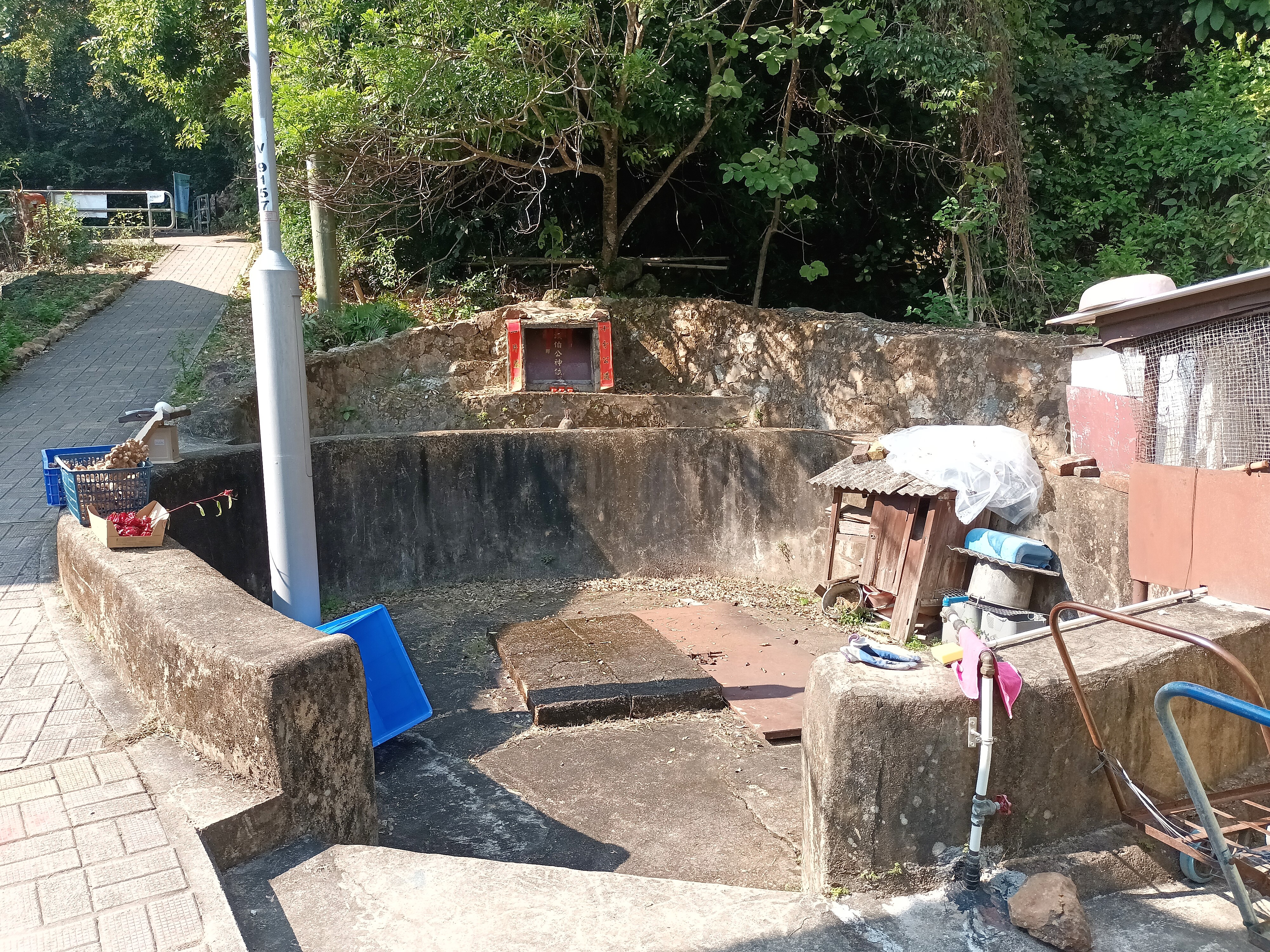
Old water well in Lai Chi Wo

Stone mills are used to peel the crust of the wheat. Each one is made up of two big cylindrical stone structure stacked together. The surface of the rocks is very rough. After you pour the wheat into the mills, you stir the rock structure, and the wheat will be peeled off into rice that villagers can eat.

By virtue of the fact that there was no tap-water, villagers have to fulfill their needs by getting waters from rivers and wells. However, there were not enough rivers near Lai Chi Wo, villagers started to dig wells and use underground water to meet the daily demands. But nowadays wells are abandoned.

=== Hing Chun Engagement (Seven-Village Square) ===
There are seven villages in the Hing Chun Alliance (慶春約, Hing Chun Yeuk). They are Lai Chi Wo, So Lo Pun, Sam A Village, Mui Tsz Lam (梅子林), Kop Tong (蛤塘), Siu Tan (小灘) and Ngau Chi Wu (牛池湖) which are located at the coast of Northeast New Territories and facing Kat O. In ancient time, when the ancestors of the 7 villages first settled in this place, the mountain and land were barren and arable lands were insufficient. They opened up wastelands and built up houses sparing no effort. Gradually, the families began to enlarge and became villages until Eastern Sha Tau Kok was developed, the 7 villages associated and made up the Hing Chung Engagement. They also opened up the Seven-Village Square. After the establishment of the engagement, the life has been smooth therefore villages all believed that it was because of the blessing of Guan Di and Guan Yin. To thank the gods and pray for good fortune, they decided to hold a ten-year session (Bun Festival).

=== Ancestral Hall ===
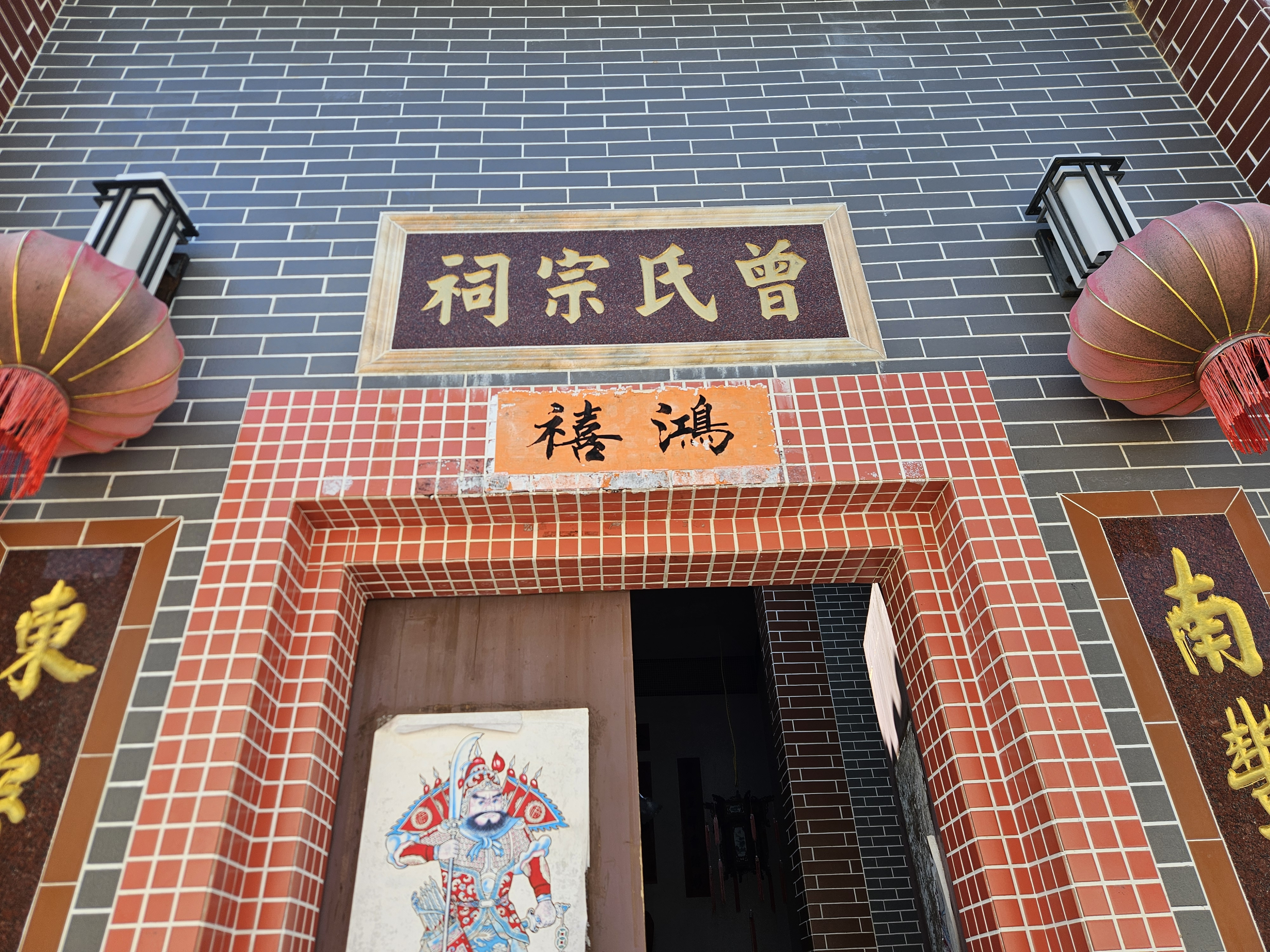
Tsang Ancestral Hall in Lai Chi Wo.

Ancestral Hall is the representative building of a clan with a lot of spirit tablet worshiping ancestors according to their positions in the family hierarchy. The eldest is located on the highest place and the younger ones are located on the lower places. Every Tomb-sweeping Day and Double Ninth Festival, or some other big festivals, villagers must visit the temple. There are two main families in Lai Chi Wo: Wong family and Tsang family. Therefore, there are temples of these two families in Lai Chi Wo.

=== Hip Tin Temple and Hok Shan Monastery ===
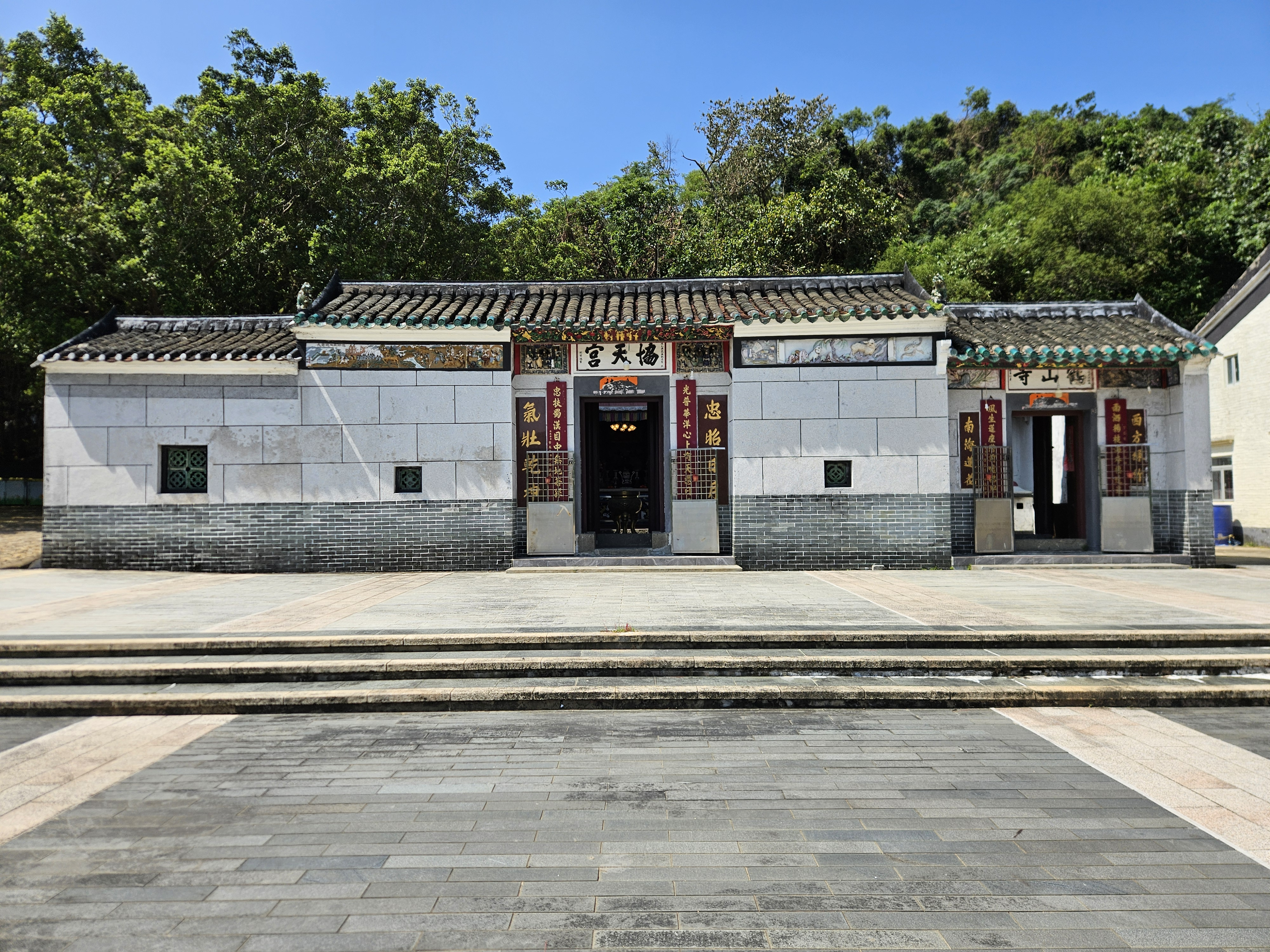
Hip Tin Temple and Hok Shan Monastery

There are two temples, Hip Tin Temple and Hok Shan Monastery, in the square of Lai Chi Wo. The two structures are connected.

They were built in the Qing dynasty and are more than two hundred years old. They were jointly built by the seven villages in Sha Tau Kok, Hing Chun Yuek for drawing good fortune and expelling the evils. The village people worship Guan Di and Guan Yin. Hip Tin Temple is for Guan Di while Hok Shan Monastery is for Guan Yin. The temples are categorised by the government as Grade II historic buildings.

=== East Gate and West Gate ===
The East Gate and the West Gate are the entrances of the village. The East Gate is the main entrance on which there was engraved a sentence 'The purple cloud comes from the East.' In Chinese, purple means good fortune. The objective of the sentence is to hope to have highly placed or high-ranking government officials and noble lords coming into the village all the time so that it makes the village prosperous and flourishing. On the other hand, there was engraved a sentence 'The west can receive the auspicious light of luck.' on the West Gate. It means the village people hope to get luck and peace.

== Environment and special species ==
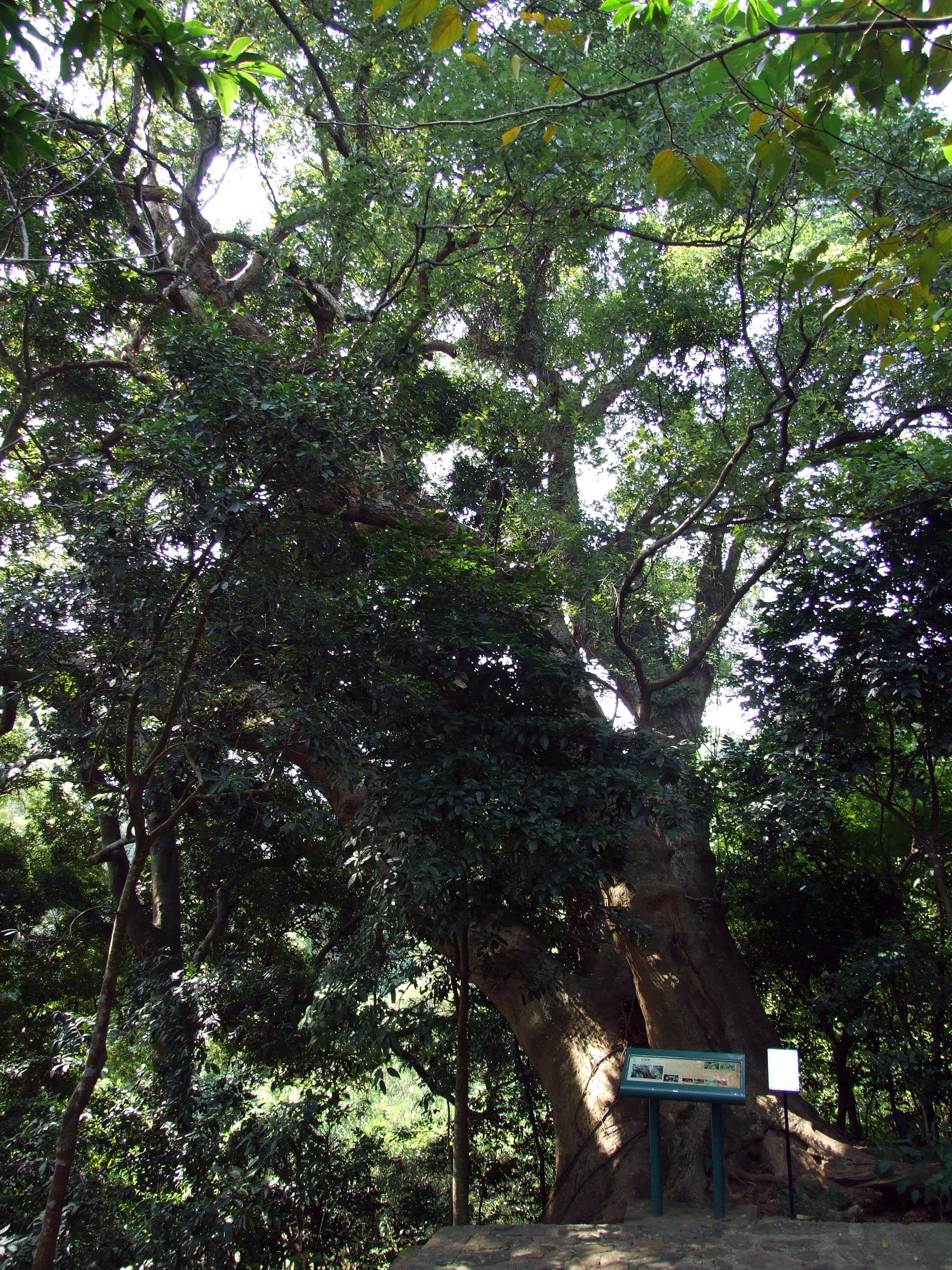
Five-finger camphor

=== Lai Chi Wo Nature Trail ===
The broad way inside the Nature Trail was constructed in 2003 as a viewing platform. It is 120 metres long and introduces three main features in the eastern mudflat corner of Lai Chi Wo. The trail is 1.2 km.

==== Looking-glass mangrove and White-flower Derris ====
The mangrove in Lai Chi Wo consists of Looking-glass mangrove (Heritiera littoralis) and White-flower Derris. Looking-glass mangrove is a species of mangrove whose biggest forest is to be found in Lai Chi Wo. Every April and May are their blossom seasons and fruits can be harvested from June to October. The fruit is round and green at first, and then become brown when it ripens. Heritiera littoralis is grand, peculiar and has a thick tree-crown. It is almost tall enough to reach the chest of people. The interlaced plank buttress serves to grasp the swampy soil in the tide zone to hold the body of the tree. And the "natural swing" around the forest of Looking-glass mangrove in fact is formed by the growing White-flower Derris.

==== Seaweeds ====
There are four main kinds of seaweeds in Hong Kong. They are Halophila beccarii (貝克喜鹽草), Halophila ovalis (喜鹽草), Ruppia maritima (川蔓藻) and Dwarf eelgrass Zostera japonica (矮大葉藻) among which Zostera japonica was first found in Lai Chi Wo in 1979. Lai Chi Wo is the only place, and also the largest bed that we can find this kind of seaweed. This seaweed bed mat the shore for more than 2 hectares on the wild open mudflat. Seaweeds are precious in Hong Kong which mainly grow along the coast of northwest and northeast of New Territories. Seaweeds hold great importance to the eco-system because it provides shelter, food and feeding place for animals living along the coast, and besides, seaweeds can prevent soil and sand from being washed away.

==== Buttress roots ====
The structures shaped like wooden slabs are named as buttress roots. Several of them can be seen inside Lai Chi Wo Nature Trail. The taller the tree, or the poorer the growing environment, the larger and stronger these buttress trees grow.

=== Lai Chi Wo Village ===
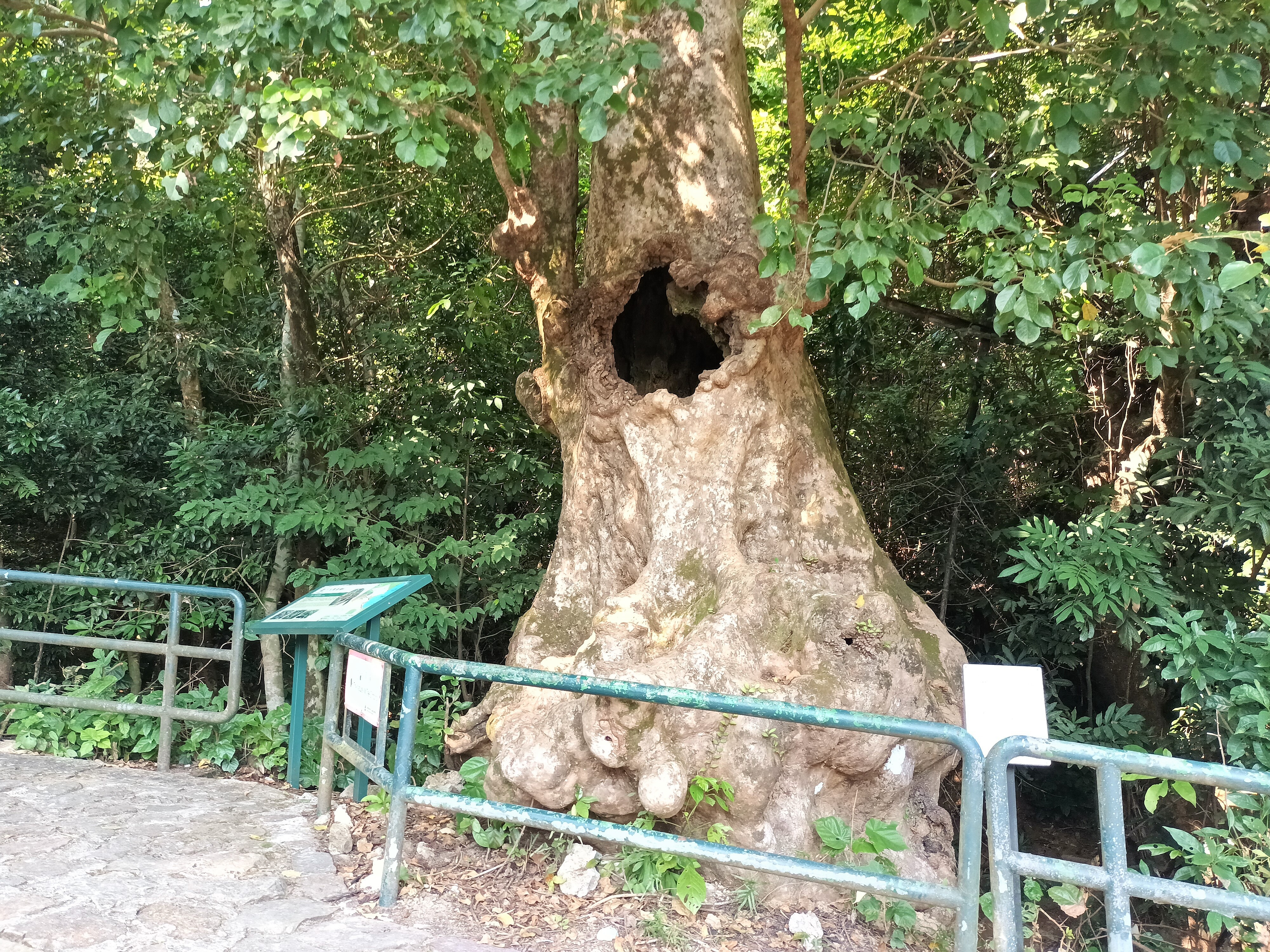
The Hollow Tree.

==== Five-finger Camphor (Cinnamomum Camphora) ====
The Camphor measures 25 metres tall and 3 metres in diameter. It gets its name because it had five branches like five fingers, although only four of them remain today. It was said that during Japanese Occupation, when Lai Chi Wo was occupied as a military backup base for the Japanese Army, the Japanese cut down many trees for fear that their enemies will hide near the area and make sudden attacks. When the soldiers threatened to chop this five-finger Camphor, the villagers stood up to protected the tree with their lives. Therefore, only one of the "fingers" has been cut.

==== The Hollow Tree (Autumn Maple) ====
The Hollow Tree is an Autumn Maple (Bischofia javanica) estimated at to about one hundred years old. It reaches a 17-metre high and 1.9-metre in diameter. It is called "hollow tree" because it has a huge hole inside the tree. The hole has openings in both upper and lower section of the tree. It is once said that there was a honeycomb and villagers tried to fire the comb but finally fired the tree altogether. However, the explanations from the description board of the tree told another cause. The parenchyma cells in the centre of the trunk contracted and withered as a result of infection. Small holes began to appear inside the tree. However, the nutrients and moisture transporting cells around the exterior part of the trunk continued to grow and thicken. The trunk later get thicker, and the centre hollow expanded in tandem.

== Transportation ==
=== Ferry ===
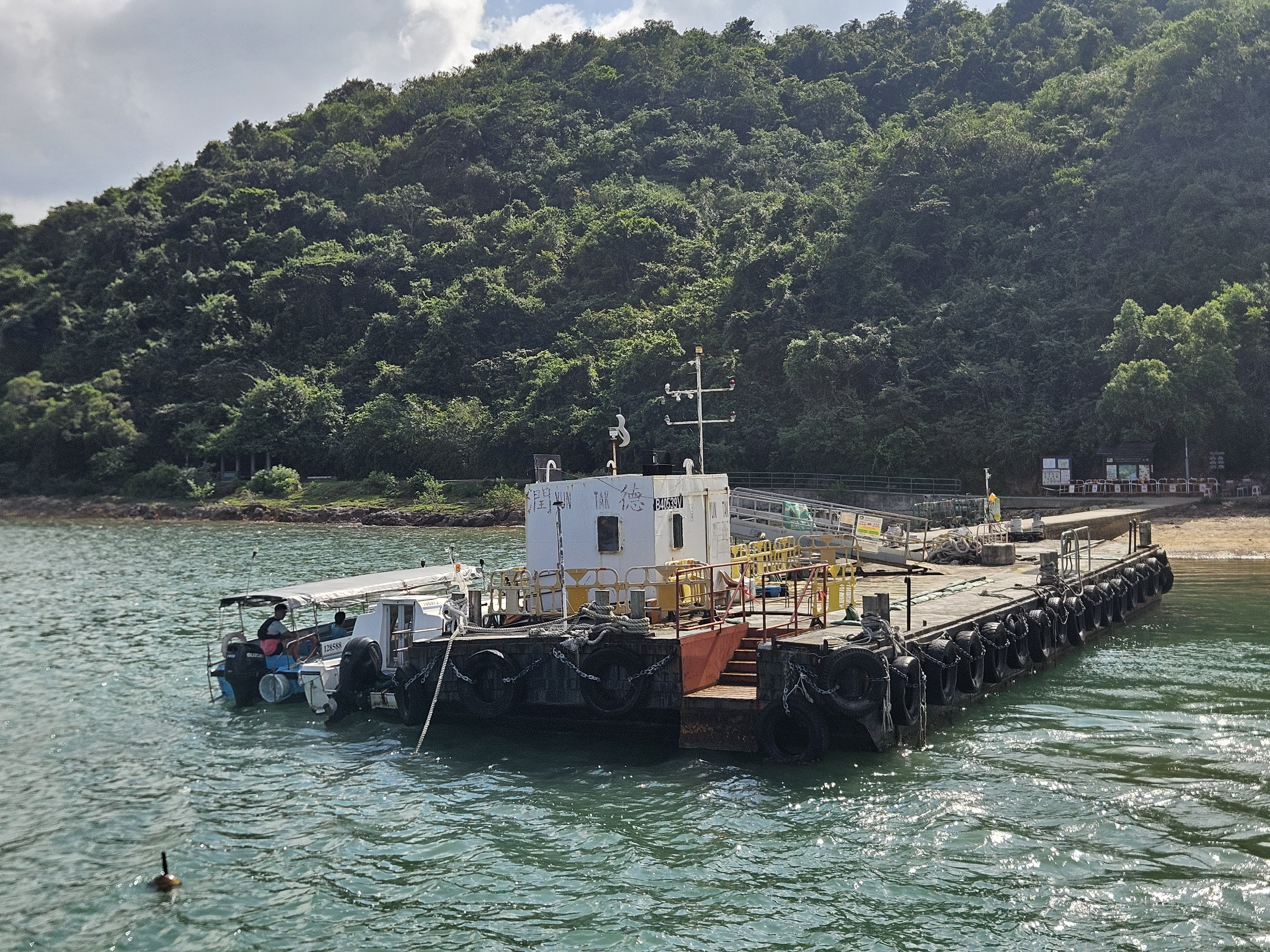
Lai Chi Wo Pier

A ferry service runs between Ma Liu Shui (Landing Steps No. 3) to Lai Chi Wo on Saturdays, Sundays and public holidays.

Visitors who carry the Sha Tau Kok permit can travel to Lai Chi Wo through boats. They can first go to Sha Tau Kok using KMB bus route 78K or Green mini-bus 55K.

=== Hiking ===
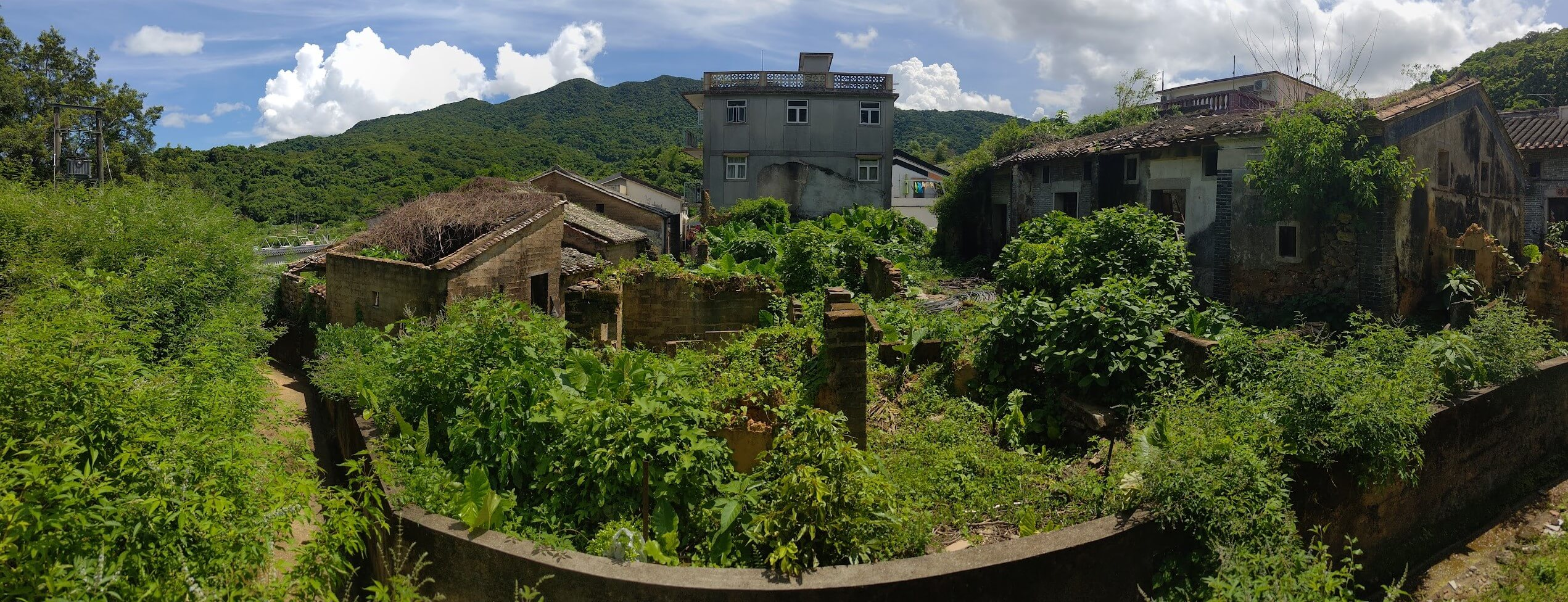
Lai Chi Wo Hakka Walled Village

Alternatively, Lai Chi Wo can be reached by hiking via one of the two popular hiking routes.

The first hiking route is from Wu Kau Tang, via Kau Tam Tso, Miu Tin and Lai Tau Shek. To get to Wu Kau Tang, hikers may use:

- Green mini-bus route 20R (daily route) from Tai Po Market station
- KMB Bus route 275R (served on Sundays and holidays only; no service on non-holiday Mondays-Saturdays), from Tai Po Market station

The second hiking route is from Luk Keng, which green mini-bus 56K serves. Hikers can walk from Luk Keng, via Tai Wan, Kuk Po and Fan Shui Au.
