= Quasipaa shini =

Conservation status
- Endangered (IUCN 3.1)

Scientific classification
- Kingdom: Animalia
- Phylum: Chordata
- Class: Amphibia
- Order: Anura
- Family: Dicroglossidae
- Genus: Quasipaa
- Species: Q. shini

Binomial name
- Quasipaa shini (Ahl, 1930)

Synonyms
- Rana shini Ahl, 1930; Paa shini (Ahl, 1930)

Species of frog

Quasipaa shini (common names: spiny-flanked frog, Chinese paa frog) is a species of frog in the family Dicroglossidae. It is endemic to southern central China (Guangxi, Guizhou, Hunan, and Chongqing). Its natural habitats are rivers in subtropical moist lowland forests and montane forest at elevations of 510–1,500 m (1,670–4,920 ft) asl. It is threatened by over-collecting for human consumption and by habitat loss.

Quasipaa shini are relatively large frogs. Males grow to a snout–vent length of about 99 mm (3.9 in) and females to 95 mm (3.7 in). Tadpoles are up to about 66 mm (2.6 in) in length.

Its specific name shini ("of Shin" in Latin) honours the biology professor Sin Shu-szi (Chinese: 辛树帜; pinyin: Xīn Shùzhì). The German zoologist Ernst Ahl, who named the species, also named the lizard Shinisaurus after professor Sin.
