= Quasipaa jiulongensis =

Conservation status
- Vulnerable (IUCN 3.1)

Scientific classification
- Kingdom: Animalia
- Phylum: Chordata
- Class: Amphibia
- Order: Anura
- Family: Dicroglossidae
- Genus: Quasipaa
- Species: Q. jiulongensis

Binomial name
- Quasipaa jiulongensis (Huang & Liu, 1985)

Synonyms
- Rana jiulongensis Huang and Liu, 1985; Paa jiulongensis (Huang and Liu, 1985)

Species of amphibian

Quasipaa jiulongensis (Jiulong paa frog or Jiulong spiny frog) is a species of frog in the family Dicroglossidae. It is endemic to eastern China and only known from the mountains of southwestern Zhejiang and adjacent Fujian above 800 m (2,600 ft) elevation. Its natural habitats are hill streams. It is threatened by habitat loss due to both logging and infrastructure development as well as by collection for food.

Quasipaa jiulongensis are moderately large frogs: males grow to a snout–vent length of about 74 mm (2.9 in) and females to 73 mm (2.9 in).
