= Quasipaa yei =

Conservation status
- Vulnerable (IUCN 3.1)

Scientific classification
- Kingdom: Animalia
- Phylum: Chordata
- Class: Amphibia
- Order: Anura
- Family: Dicroglossidae
- Genus: Quasipaa
- Species: Q. yei

Binomial name
- Quasipaa yei (Chen, Qu & Jiang, 2002)

Synonyms
- Paa yei Chen, Qu & Jiang, 2002

Species of frog

Quasipaa yei, or Ye's spiny-vented frog, is a species of frog in the family Dicroglossidae. It is endemic to China where it is known from the Dabie Mountains that straddle the border between Hubei, Henan, and Anhui provinces. Its type locality is in Shengcheng County in Jiyuan City, Henan. Its natural habitats are temperate rivers with surrounding forests. It is potentially threatened by habitat loss. It was named for herpetologist Ye Changyuan.

The taxonomic position of this species has been in flux. Originally described as Paa (Feirana) yei in 2002, it has already been placed in genera Feirana (if raised from subgenus to genus), Yerana, and Nanorana, at least, before arriving at genus Quasipaa.

== In medicine ==
The species is used in development of a drug called Rhodopsin.
