= So Lo Pun =

So Lo Pun 鎖羅盆
- village
- Location within Hong Kong
- Coordinates: 22.5362808°N 114.251960°E
- Country: People's Republic of China
- Special administrative region: Hong Kong
- Region: New Territories
- District: North District
- Time zone: UTC+8:00

So Lo Pun (Chinese: 鎖羅盆) is a village in the northeastern New Territories of Hong Kong, within the Plover Cove Country Park. It is located northwest of Lai Chi Wo and northeast of Kuk Po. Today, the village is derelict and is uninhabited. Descendants of the former inhabitants have either emigrated abroad or have relocated to more urbanized parts of Hong Kong.

According to urban legend, the village is haunted. Hikers have also reported that compasses tend to stop working when they enter the village area, leading to the village being dubbed 'So Lo Pun', which in Chinese literally means that 'the compass is locked'.

== Recognised status ==
So Lo Pun is a recognised village under the New Territories Small House Policy.

== History ==
The village was once the home of generations of the Wong family. Recorded history suggests that after migrating movement in a south easterly direction (supposedly from, what is now, Mainland China), the person named Wong Wai Hing was an early settler and founding forefather of So Lo Pun village. Other early settlers are Tsu Kim Gong, Sing Lueng Gong, Yuk Chung Gong and Si Yuen Gong. (Gong meaning forefather in the Hakka Language). These people lived circa 872 AD.

The closest researched descendants of the So Lo Pun village are as follows: Si Chow Gong, Tsip Yuen Gong, Chun Kee Gong, Yuk Man Gong, Si Tak Gong and Yuk Choi Gong (all deceased).

So Lo Pun is one of the seven Hakka villages of the Hing Chun Yeuk (慶春約; 'Hing Chun Alliance'), which comprises Kop Tong, Lai Chi Wo, Mui Tsz Lam, Ngau Shi Wu, Sam A Village, Siu Tan (小灘), and So Lo Pun.

== See also ==
- List of villages in Hong Kong
- Sha Tau Kok
