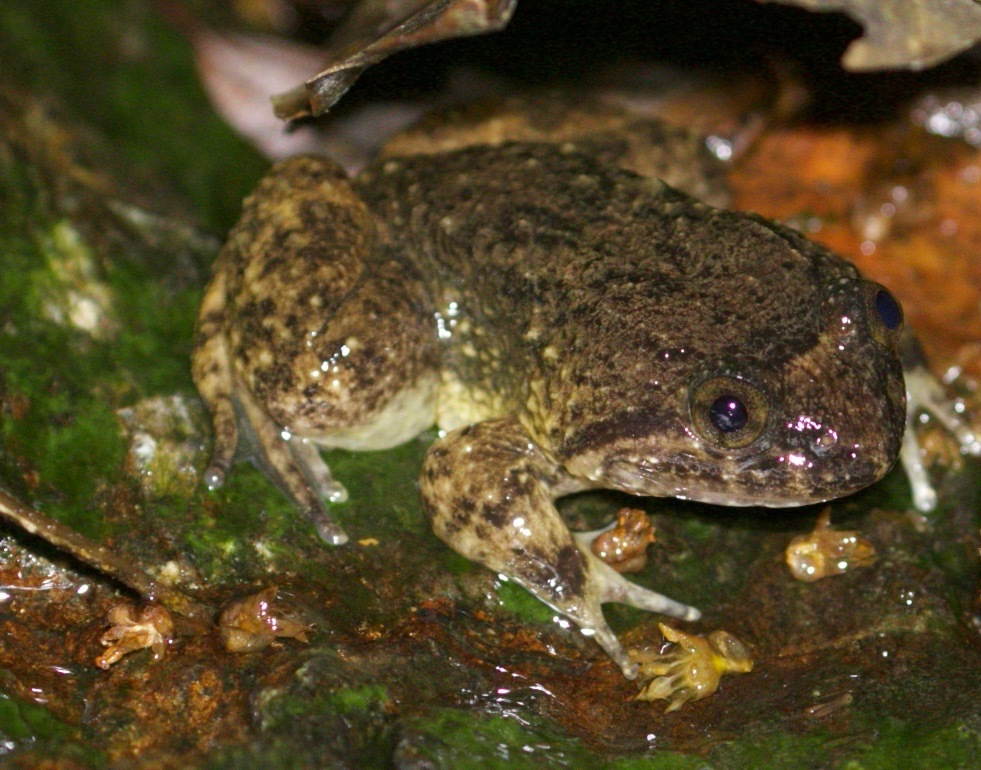
- Quasipaa verrucospinosa in Vietnam

Conservation status
- Least Concern (IUCN 3.1)

Scientific classification
- Kingdom: Animalia
- Phylum: Chordata
- Class: Amphibia
- Order: Anura
- Family: Dicroglossidae
- Genus: Quasipaa
- Species: Q. verrucospinosa

Binomial name
- Quasipaa verrucospinosa (Bourret, 1937)

Synonyms
- Rana spinosa verrucospinosa Bourret, 1937; Paa verrucospinosa (Bourret, 1937); Rana verrucospinosa (Bourret, 1937); Nanorana verrucospinosa (Bourret, 1937)

= Quasipaa verrucospinosa =

Species of frog

Quasipaa verrucospinosa is a species of frog in the family Dicroglossidae. It is found in Laos, Vietnam, and Yunnan, China. It occurs in and around streams (its breeding habitat) in hill and lower montane evergreen forests. It is believed to be relatively common, but it is threatened by collection for consumption and—presumably—habitat loss driven by logging, causing degradation of forest habitat and stream sedimentation.
