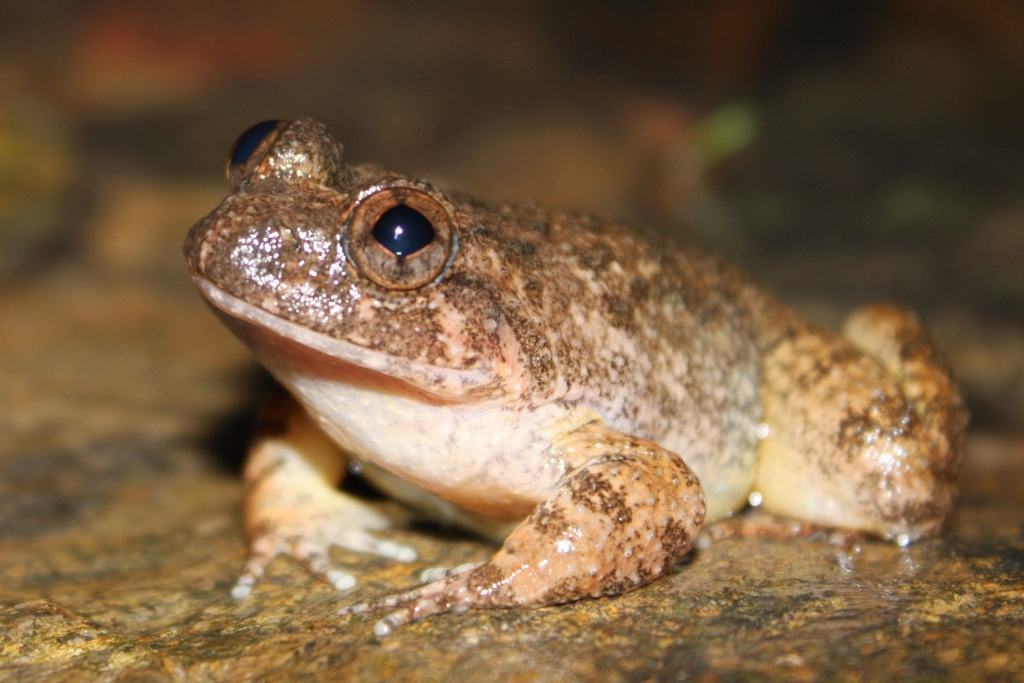

Conservation status
- Least Concern (IUCN 3.1)

Scientific classification
- Kingdom: Animalia
- Phylum: Chordata
- Class: Amphibia
- Order: Anura
- Family: Dicroglossidae
- Genus: Quasipaa
- Species: Q. exilispinosa

Binomial name
- Quasipaa exilispinosa (Liu & Hu, 1975)

Synonyms
- Rana exilispinosa Liu and Hu, 1975; Paa exilispinosa (Liu and Hu, 1975); Rana paraspinosa Dubois, 1975

= Quasipaa exilispinosa =

Species of amphibian

Quasipaa exilispinosa is a species of frog in the family Dicroglossidae. It is known under many common names, including Hong Kong spiny frog, common spiny frog, lesser spiny frog, little spiny frog, and Hong Kong paa frog. It has a patchy distribution in southern China including Hong Kong. Its natural habitats are subtropical hill streams in forests or shrublands, and sometimes also seepages, stream-fed marshes, and forests. It is threatened by over-collecting for human consumption and by habitat loss.

As hinted by common names "lesser" or "little" spiny frog, Quasipaa exilispinosa are relatively small among Quasipaa and the related frogs. Males grow to a snout–vent length of about 61 mm (2.4 in) and females to 57 mm (2.2 in). Tadpoles are up to about 39 mm (1.5 in) in length.
