= List of amphibians of Northeast India =

The following is a list of amphibians of Northeast India. The presence of amphibian species in each of the seven Northeastern states is indicated by green checkmarks. Species endemic to Northeast India are labeled as endemic. The list is based on Sen (2004), with additional records from Nagaland included from Ao, et al. (2003).

Due to its humid climate, Meghalaya has the most amphibian species diversity.

== List ==
Scientific name	Citation	Family	Meghalaya	Assam	Arunachal Pradesh	Manipur	Nagaland	Mizoram	Tripura	Status	Endemism
Pleurodeles verrucosus	(Anderson, 1871)	Salamandridae	check		check	check				Endangered	
Ichthyophis garoensis	Pillai & Ravichandran, 1999	Ichthyophiidae	check							Not evaluated	Endemic
Ichthyophis glutinosus	(Linnaeus, 1754)	Ichthyophiidae		check						Not evaluated	
Ichthyophis husaini	Pillai & Ravichandran, 1999	Ichthyophiidae	check							Not evaluated	Endemic
Gegeniophis fulleri	(Alcock, 1904)	Caeciliidae		check						Vulnerable	Endemic
Leptobrachium hasseltii	Tschudii, 1838	Megophryidae	check	check						Endangered	
Leptolalax lateralis	(Anderson, 1871)	Megophryidae		check	check					Data deficient	
Megophrys monticola	Kuhl & Van Hasselt, 1822	Megophryidae	check		check		check			Endangered	
Megophrys parva	(Boulenger, 1893)	Megophryidae	check	check	check					Near threatened	
Xenophrys glandulosa	(Boulenger, 1890)	Megophryidae					check			Least concern	
Xenophrys major	(Boulenger, 1908)	Megophryidae					check			Least concern	
Xenophrys wuliangshanensis	Ye & Fei, 1995	Megophryidae					check			Not evaluated	
Megophrys serchhipii	Mathew & Sen, 2007	Megophryidae						check		Not evaluated	
Megophrys zunhebotoensis	Mathew & Sen, 2007	Megophryidae					check			Not evaluated	
Scutiger sikimmensis	(Blyth, 1854)	Megophryidae	check				check			Near threatened	
Duttaphrynus himalayanus	Gunther, 1864	Bufonidae	check	check	check	check				Near threatened	
Duttaphrynus melanostictus	Schneider, 1799	Bufonidae	check	check	check	check	check	check	check	Vulnerable	
Bufo stomaticus	Lutken, 1862	Bufonidae		check						Near threatened	
Bufo stuarti	Smith, 1929	Bufonidae		check						Near threatened	
Bufoides meghalayanus	(Yazdani & Chanda, 1971)	Bufonidae	check	check				check		Critically endangered	Endemic
Pedostibes kempi	(Boulenger, 1919)	Bufonidae	check							Critically endangered	Endemic
Hyla annectans	(Jerdon, 1870)	Hylidae	check	check			check		check	Near threatened	
Kaloula taprobanica	(Parker, 1934)	Microhylidae	check	check					check	Not evaluated	
Kalophrynus orangensis	Dutta, Ahmed & Das, 2000	Microhylidae		check						Not evaluated	Endemic
Microhyla berdmorei	(Blyth, 1856)	Microhylidae	check	check	check			check	check	Near threatened	
Microhyla ornata	(Dumeril & Bibron, 1841)	Microhylidae	check	check	check	check	check	check	check	Least concern	
Microhyla rubra	(Jerdon, 1853)	Microhylidae		check			check	check		Near threatened	
Uperodon globulosus	(Gunther, 1864)	Microhylidae		check	check					Near threatened	
Chirixalus doriae	Boulenger, 1893	Rhacophoridae			check					Endangered	
Chirixalus simus	Annandale, 1915	Rhacophoridae		check						Endangered	Endemic
Chirixalus vittatus	(Boulenger, 1887)	Rhacophoridae			check		check	check		Endangered	
Nyctixalus moloch	(Annandale, 1912)	Rhacophoridae		check	check					Endangered	
Theloderma andersoni	(Ahl, 1927)	Rhacophoridae	check	check	check		check	check		Endangered	
Philautus annandalii	(Boulenger, 1906)	Rhacophoridae	check	check	check					Near threatened	
Chiromantis cherrapunjiae	Roonwal & Kripalani, 1961	Rhacophoridae	check	check	check					Endangered	Endemic
Philautus garo	(Boulenger, 1919)	Rhacophoridae	check	check			check			Critically endangered	Endemic
Philautus kempiae	(Boulenger, 1919)	Rhacophoridae	check	check						Critically endangered	Endemic
Philautus namdaphaensis	Sarkar & Sanyal, 1985	Rhacophoridae			check					Vulnerable	Endemic
Philautus kempii	(Annandale, 1912)	Rhacophoridae			check					Endangered	
Philautus shillongensis	Pillai & Chanda, 1973	Rhacophoridae	check							Critically endangered	Endemic
Chiromantis shyamrupus	Chanda & Ghosh, 1989	Rhacophoridae			check					Vulnerable	Endemic
Polypedates leucomystax	(Gravenhorst, 1829)	Rhacophoridae	check	check	check	check	check	check	check	Least concern	
Polypedates maculatus	(Gray, 1834)	Rhacophoridae	check		check					Endangered	
Polypedates megacephalus	Hallowell, 1861	Rhacophoridae					check			Not evaluated	
Polypedates teraiensis	(Dubois, 1987)	Rhacophoridae					check			Not evaluated	
Rhacophorus appendiculatus	(Gunther, 1859)	Rhacophoridae			check					Data deficient	
Rhacophorus bipunctatus	Ahi, 1927	Rhacophoridae	check	check	check	check	check		check	Near threatened	
Rhacophorus bisacculus	Taylor, 1962	Rhacophoridae					check			Endangered	
Rhacophorus gongshanensis	(Yang & Su, 1984)	Rhacophoridae					check			Not evaluated	
Frankixalus jerdonii	(Gunther, 1875)	Rhacophoridae		check	check				-	Vulnerable	
Rhacophorus maximus	Gunther, 1858	Rhacophoridae	check	check	check	check	check	check		Near threatened	
Rhacophorus namdaphaensis	Sarkar & Sanyal, 1985	Rhacophoridae			check					Vulnerable	Endemic
Rhacophorus naso	Annandale, 1912	Rhacophoridae			check					Data deficient	Endemic
Rhacophorus nigropalmatus	Boulenger, 1895	Rhacophoridae	check		check					Not evaluated	
Rhacophorus reinwardtii	(Kuhi & van Hasselt, 1822)	Rhacophoridae	check		check					Near threatened	
Rhacophorus tuberculatus	(Anderson, 1871)	Rhacophoridae	check	check	check					Near threatened	
Theloderma asperum	(Boulenger)	Rhacophoridae		check	check		check			Data deficient	
Chaparana sikimensis	(Jerdon, 1870)	Dicroglossidae	check							Near threatened	
Euphlyctis cyanophlyctis	(Schneider, 1799)	Dicroglossidae	check	check	check	check	check	check	check	Near threatened	
Euphlyctis ghosi	(Chanda, 1990)	Dicroglossidae				check				Endangered	Endemic
Euphlyctis hexadactylus	(Lesson, 1984)	Dicroglossidae							check	Near threatened	
Fejervarya teraiensis	(Dubois, 1975)	Dicroglossidae					check			Not evaluated	
Fejervarya nepalensis	(Dubois, 1834)	Dicroglossidae					check			Not evaluated	
Hoplobatrachus crassus	(Jerdon, 1853)	Dicroglossidae		check	check		check		check	Not evaluated	
Hoplobatrachus tigerinus	(Daudin, 1802)	Dicroglossidae	check	check	check	check	check	check	check	Vulnerable	
Limnonectes khasiensis	(Anderson, 1871)	Dicroglossidae	check							Data deficient	Endemic
Limnonectes kuhlii	(Tschudi, 1838)	Dicroglossidae	check	check						Not evaluated	
Limnonectes laticeps	(Boulenger, 1882)	Dicroglossidae	check	check	check					Not evaluated	
Limnonectes limnocharis	(Gravenhorst, 1829)	Dicroglossidae	check	check	check	check	check	check	check	Vulnerable	
Limnonectes mawlyndipi	(Chanda, 1990)	Dicroglossidae	check							Critically endangered	
Limnonectes mawphlangensis	(Pillai & Chanda, 1977)	Dicroglossidae	check			check	check			Critically endangered	
Nanorana annandalii	(Boulenger, 1920)	Dicroglossidae			check		check			Not evaluated	
Nanorana blanfordii	(Boulenger, 1882)	Dicroglossidae	check							Near threatened	
Nanorana liebigii	(Gunther, 1860)	Dicroglossidae			check					Near threatened	
Nanorana mokokchungensis	Das & Chanda, 2000	Dicroglossidae					check			Not evaluated	Endemic
Occidozyga borealis	(Annandale, 1912)	Dicroglossidae			check		check			Endangered	Endemic
Amolops afghanus	(Gunther, 1858)	Ranidae	check	check	check	check	check	check	check	Near threatened	
Amolops formosus	(Annandale, 1875)	Ranidae	check		check		check			Near threatened	
Amolops gerbillus	(Annandale, 1912)	Ranidae	check	check	check		check	check		Near threatened	
Amolops marmoratus	(Annandale, 1912)	Ranidae			check		check			Not evaluated	
Amolops viridimaculatus	(Jiang, 1983)	Ranidae					check			Not evaluated	
Clinotarsus alticola	Boulenger, 1882	Ranidae	check	check			check	check	check	Near threatened	
Ombrana sikimensis	Sclater, 1892	Ranidae	check							Near threatened	
Hylarana danieli	Pillai & Chanda, 1977	Ranidae	check	check	check	check		check		Near threatened	
Hylarana erythraea	(Schlegel, 1837)	Ranidae	check	check	check		check	check		Near threatened	
Hylarana garoensis	Boulenger, 1920	Ranidae	check	check	check	check	check			Endangered	Endemic
Zakerana keralensis	Dubois, 1980	Ranidae							check	Not evaluated	
Pterorana khare	(Kiyasetuo & Khare, 1986)	Ranidae				check	check	check		Endangered	Endemic
Hylarana leptoglossa	(Cope, 1868)	Ranidae	check	check						Endangered	
Odorrana livida	(Blyth, 1855)	Ranidae	check	check		check	check			Near threatened	
Hylarana malabarica	Tschudi, 1838	Ranidae		check				check		Not evaluated	
Hylarana nicobariensis	(Stoliczkae, 1870)	Ranidae		check					check	Near threatened	
Hylarana nigrovittata	(Blyth, 1855)	Ranidae		check						Endangered	
Hylarana taipehensis	Van Denburgh, 1909	Ranidae	check	check	check					Not evaluated	
Hylarana tytleri	(Theobald, 1868)	Ranidae					check			Not evaluated	
Humerana humeralis	Boulenger, 1887	Ranidae					check			Not evaluated	

== Names in local languages ==
Below are some frog names in the Miju language of Arunachal Pradesh.

- Hoplobatrachus tigerinus: hāŋgrān
- Hylarana taipehensis: phòlōlōnt
- Megophrys parva: tāʔòŋ
- Duttaphrynus melanostictus: càŋ khàŋ ə̄pay
- Bufo stomaticus: hāŋŋūm

== See also ==
- List of amphibians of India
- List of amphibians of Bhutan
- List of amphibians of Sikkim
