= List of amphibians of Bhutan =

The following is a list of amphibians of Bhutan from Wangyal (2013, 2014). In Bhutan, Hoplobatrachus tigerinus is widely consumed by people. Nanorana annandalii and Nanorana blanfordii are consumed by the residents of Sakteng, Trashigang District.

== Frogs ==
=== Family Bufonidae ===
- Duttaphrynus chandai
- Duttaphrynus nagalandensis
- Duttaphrynus himalayanus
- Duttaphrynus melanostictus
- Duttaphrynus cf. stuarti

=== Family Dicroglossidae ===
- Euphlyctis cyanophlyctis
- Fejervarya cf. limnocharis
- Fejervarya nepalensis
- Fejervarya pierrei
- Fejervarya teraiensis
- Hoplobatrachus crassus
- Hoplobatrachus tigerinus
- Nanorana annandalii
- Nanorana arnoldi
- Nanorana blanfordii
- Nanorana conaensis
- Nanorana liebigii
- Nanorana parkeri
- Nanorana pleskei
- Nanorana vicina
- Nanorana sp.
- Occidozyga borealis
- Ombrana sikimensis

=== Family Megophryidae ===
- Scutiger bhutanensis — endemic
- Scutiger boulengeri
- Scutiger sikimmensis
- Xenophrys glandulosa
- Xenophrys major
- Xenophrys minor
- Xenophrys cf. nankiangensis
- Xenophrys parva

=== Family Microhylidae ===
- Microhyla ornata

=== Family Ranidae ===
- Amolops formosus
- Amolops gerbillus
- Amolops himalayanus
- Amolops mantzorum
- Amolops marmoratus
- Amolops cf. monticola
- Clinotarsus alticola
- Humerana humeralis
- Hyla cf. annectans
- Hylarana sp.
- Hylarana nigrovittata
- Hylarana taipehensis
- Hylarana tytleri
- Lithobates catesbeianus — dubious
- Rana (Sylvirana) sp.
- Sylvirana cf. guentheri
- Sylvirana leptoglossa

=== Family Rhacophoridae ===
- Polypedates cf. himalayensis
- Polypedates maculatus
- Rhacophorus maximus
- Rhacophorus tuberculatus
- Theloderma andersoni
- Theloderma asperum

== Salamanders ==
=== Family Salamandridae ===
- Tylototriton verrucosus

== Caecilians ==
=== Family Ichthyophiidae ===
- Ichthyophis sikkimensis

== See also ==
- List of amphibians of Sikkim
- List of amphibians of Northeast India
- List of amphibians of India
