= List of amphibians of Sikkim =

The following is a list of amphibians of Sikkim.

== Caecilians ==
Family Ichthyophiidae

- Common yellow-banded caecilian (Ichthyophis glutinosus)
- Black caecilian (Ichthyophis monochrous)
- Sikkimese caecilian (Ichthyophis sikkimensis)

== Salamanders ==
Family Salamandridae

- Himalayan newt (Tylototriton verrucosus)

== Frogs ==
Family Bufonidae

- Himalayan toad (Duttaphrynus himalayanus)
- Asian common toad (Duttaphrynus melanostictus)
- Duttaphrynus stuarti

Family Dicroglossidae

- Indian skipper frog (Euphlyctis cyanophlyctis)
- Rice field frog (Fejervarya limnocharis)
- Northern frog (Injerana borealis)
- Nepal cricket frog (Minervarya nepalensis)
- Terai cricket frog (Minervarya teraiensis)
- Annandale’s paa frog (Nanorana annandalii)
- Blanford’s paa frog (Nanorana blanfordii)
- Torrent paa frog (Nanorana ercepeae)
- Nanorana gammii
- Liebig’s paa frog (Nanorana liebigii)
- Small paa frog (Nanorana minica)
- Polunin’s paa frog (Nanorana polunini)
- Ombrana sikimensis
- Indian burrowing frog (Sphaerotheca breviceps)

Family Microhylidae

- Ornate narrow-mouthed frog (Microhyla ornata)

Family Megophryidae

- Concave-crowned horned toad (Boulenophrys parva)
- Pale-shouldered horned toad (Boulenophrys boettgeri)
- Boulenger’s lazy toad (Scutiger boulengeri)
- Scutiger sikimensis
- Xenophrys major
- White-lipped horned toad (Xenophrys robusta)

Family Ranidae

- Kachin torrent frog (Amolops afghanus)
- Beautiful stream frog (Amolops formosus)
- Gerbil stream frog (Amolops gerbillus)
- Himalaya cascade frog (Amolops himalayanus)
- Marbled cascade frog (Amolops marmoratus)
- Mountain stream frog (Amolops monticola)
- Palebrown stream frog (Clinotarsus alticola)

Family Rhacophoridae

- Nasutixalus jerdonii
- Philautus dubius
- Common tree frog (Polypedates leucomystax)
- Indian tree frog (Polypedates maculatus)
- Hong Kong whipping frog (Polypedates megacephalus)
- Coppersmith frog (Raorchestes annandalii)
- Green flying frog (Rhacophorus reinwardtii)
- Nepal flying frog (Zhangixalus smaragdinus)

== See also ==
- List of amphibians of Bhutan
- List of amphibians of Northeast India
- List of amphibians of India
