= Annandale's frog (disambiguation) =

Annandale's frog (Clinotarsus alticola) is a frog in the family Ranidae found in northeastern India, Bangladesh, Myanmar, northern Peninsular Thailand, and possibly Bhutan and Nepal.

Annandale's frog may also refer to:

- Annandale's bush frog (Raorchestes annandalii), a frog in the family Rhacophoridae found in the eastern Himalayas in India, Nepal, and Bhutan
- Annandale's high altitude frog (Kurixalus naso), a frog in the family Rhacophoridae found in northeastern India, Tibet, and Myanmar
- Annandale's paa frog (Nanorana annandalii), a frog in the family Dicroglossidae found in northeastern India (Arunachal Pradesh and West Bengal) and eastern Nepal
- Annandale's tree frog or Annandale's pigmy tree frog (Chiromantis simus), a frog in the family Rhacophoridae found in Bangladesh and northeastern India (in Assam, Mizoram, and West Bengal states)
