= Hill frog (disambiguation) =

The hill frog (Clinotarsus alticola) is a frog in the family Ranidae found in northeastern India, Bangladesh, Myanmar, northern Peninsular Thailand, and possibly Bhutan and Nepal.

Hill frog may also refer to:

- Boulenger's Garo hill frog (Hylarana garoensis), a frog in the family Ranidae found in India and possibly Bangladesh
- Boulenger's hill frog (Nanorana annandalii), a frog in the family Dicroglossidae found in India and Nepal
- Dubois' hill frog (Zakerana keralensis), a frog in the family Dicroglossidae found in India
- Tirunvelveli's hill frog (Nyctibatrachus beddomii), a frog in the family Nyctibatrachidae endemic to southern Western Ghats of India
