= Assam frog =

Assam frog may refer to:

- Assam Asian frog (Chiromantis simus), a frog in the family Rhacophoridae found in Bangladesh and northeastern India (Assam, Mizoram, and West Bengal states)
- Assam forest frog (Hylarana leptoglossa), a frog in the family Rhacophoridae native to Bangladesh, northeastern India, Myanmar, and western Thailand
- Assam sucker frog (Amolops formosus), a frog in the family Randidae found in northern India, northern Bangladesh, and Nepal
