= Palebrown frog =

Palebrown frog may refer to:

- Palebrown small frog (Hylarana leptoglossa), a frog in the family Ranidae native to Bangladesh, India, Myanmar, and Thailand
- Palebrown stream frog (Clinotarsus alticola), a frog in the family Ranidae found in India, Bangladesh, Myanmar, Thailand, and possibly Bhutan and Nepal
