= Boulenger's frog =

Boulenger's frog may refer to:

- Boulenger's African river frog (Phrynobatrachus ogoensis), a frog in the family Petropedetidae found in Gabon and Liberia
- Boulenger's callulops frog (Callulops robustus), a frog in the family Microhylidae found in Indonesia and Papua New Guinea
- Boulenger's climbing frog (Anodonthyla boulengerii), a frog in the family Microhylidae endemic to Madagascar
- Boulenger's Garo hill frog (Hylarana garoensis), a frog in the family Ranidae found in India and possibly Bangladesh
- Boulenger's hill frog (Nanorana annandalii), a frog in the family Dicroglossidae found in northeastern India (Arunachal Pradesh and West Bengal) and eastern Nepal
- Boulenger's narrow-eyed frog (Nyctibatrachus major), a frog in the family Nyctibatrachidae endemic to Malabar and Wynaad, Kerala, and Tamil Nadu, India
- Boulenger's snouted tree frog (Scinax boulengeri), a frog in the family Hylidae found in Colombia, Costa Rica, Nicaragua, Panama, and possibly Honduras
- Boulenger's spiny frog (Quasipaa boulengeri), a frog in the family Dicroglossidae found in southern and southwestern China and northern Vietnam
- Boulenger's wrinkled ground frog or Boulenger's platymantis (Platymantis boulengeri), a frog in the family Ceratobatrachidae endemic to New Britain Island in the Bismarck Archipelago, Papua New Guinea
