= Himalaya frog =

Himalaya frog may refer to:

- High Himalaya frog (Nanorana), a genus of frogs in the family Dicroglossidae frog found in Asia
- Himalaya bubble-nest frog (Raorchestes annandalii), a frog in the family Rhacophoridae found in India, Nepal, and Bhutan
- Himalaya sucker frog (Amolops himalayanus), a frog in the family Ranidae found in northeastern India and Nepal
