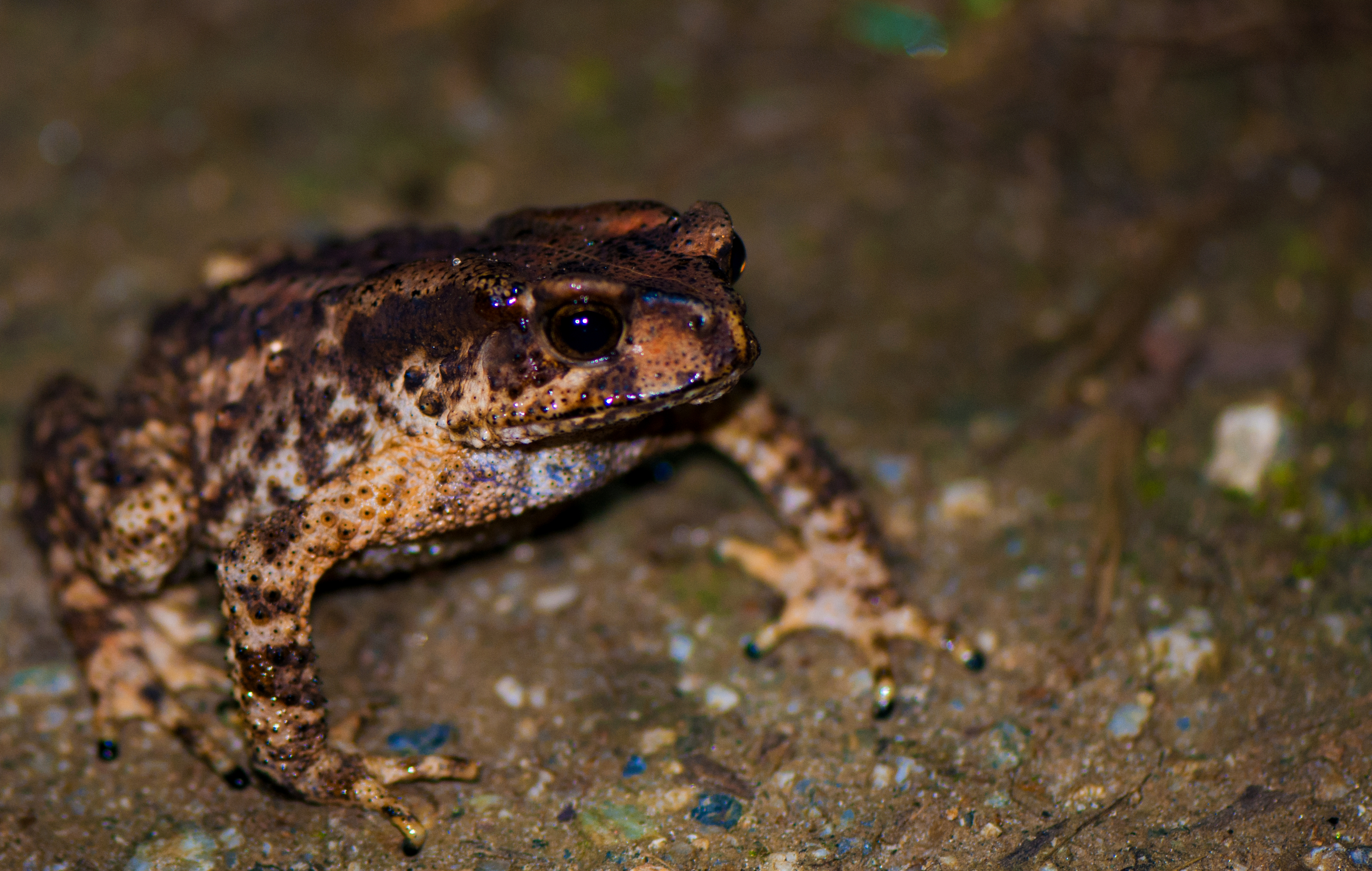

Conservation status
- Least Concern (IUCN 3.1)

Scientific classification
- Kingdom: Animalia
- Phylum: Chordata
- Class: Amphibia
- Order: Anura
- Family: Bufonidae
- Genus: Bufo
- Species: B. stuarti

Binomial name
- Bufo stuarti Smith, 1929

= Bufo stuarti =

Species of amphibian

Bufo stuarti is a species of toad found in Southeast Asia, known only from northern Myanmar and northeastern India. The type locality is the Putao plains.
