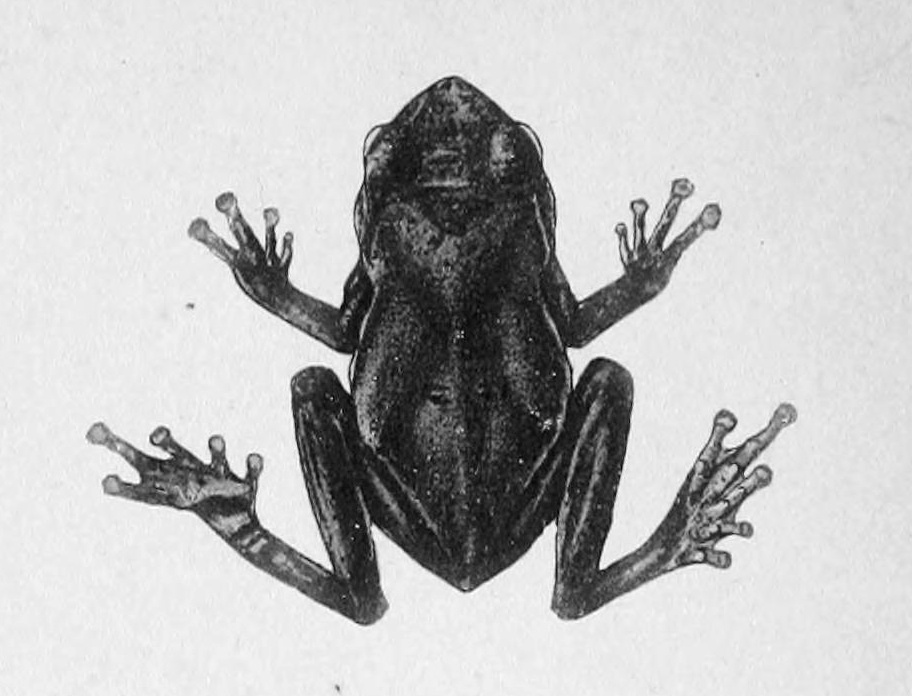

Conservation status
- Least Concern (IUCN 3.1)

Scientific classification
- Domain: Eukaryota
- Kingdom: Animalia
- Phylum: Chordata
- Class: Amphibia
- Order: Anura
- Family: Rhacophoridae
- Genus: Raorchestes
- Species: R. andersoni

Binomial name
- Raorchestes andersoni (Ahl, 1927)

Synonyms
- Ixalus tuberculatus Anderson, 1879 "1878" — secondary homonym of Polypedates tuberculatus Anderson, 1871; Rhacophorus andersoni Ahl, 1927 — replacement name; Philautus andersoni Bourret, 1942; Theloderma andersoni Li, Che, Murphy, Zhao, Zhao, Rao, and Zhang, 2009

= Raorchestes andersoni =

Species of frog

Raorchestes andersoni is a species of frog in the family Rhacophoridae. It is found in northeast India, northern Myanmar, and Tibet and Yunnan, China. The common names Anderson's bubble-nest frog, Anderson's bush frog and tuberculed small treefrog have been coined for it.

Its natural habitats are tropical forest edges and marshes. It is an arboreal species that breeds in small, temporary water pools. It has been recorded in the Nameri National Park in India and just outside the Hkakabo Razi National Park in Myanmar. This frog has been observed between 0 and 2006 meters above sea level.
