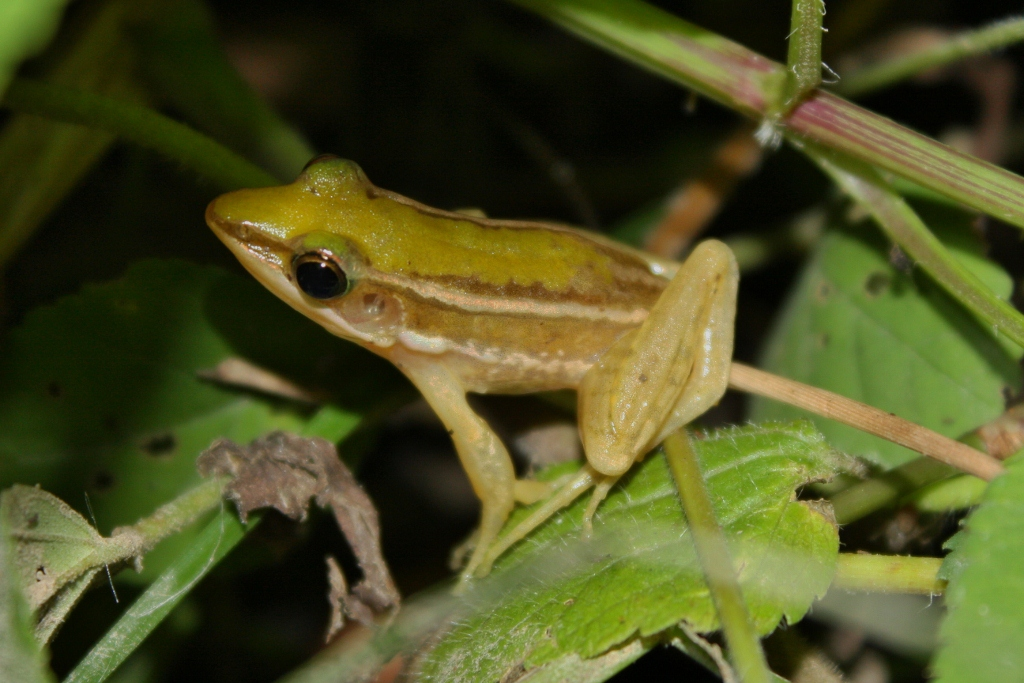

Conservation status
- Least Concern (IUCN 3.1)

Scientific classification
- Kingdom: Animalia
- Phylum: Chordata
- Class: Amphibia
- Order: Anura
- Family: Ranidae
- Genus: Hylarana
- Species: H. taipehensis

Binomial name
- Hylarana taipehensis (Van Denburgh, 1909)

Synonyms
- Rana taipehensis Van Denburgh, 1909

= Hylarana taipehensis =

Species of amphibian

Hylarana taipehensis is a species of "true frog", family Ranidae. It has several common names, including Taipei frog, Taipei grass frog, two-striped grass frog, or striped slender frog. Following its redelimitation in 2019, its range is now believed to extend from Taiwan and southern China (including Hainan) to Vietnam, Laos, Cambodia, and eastern Thailand. It has been observed as high as 800 meters above sea level.

== Description ==
Males are usually less than 3 cm (1.2 in) in snout-vent length and females less than 4 cm (1.6 in). The dorsum is yellowish green to greenish brown and the sides are light yellowish brown. Paired dorso-lateral glandular folds are visible as brownish black lines. The limbs are light brown and have dark brown stripes. The abdomen and neck have tiny spots and have three brownish black stripes each. The tympanum and the region behind and below it are dark blackish brown in color.

== Habitat and conservation ==
Hylarana taipehensis occurs in open, grassy wetlands, rice paddies, river floodplains, and forest ponds and swampy areas in deciduous forests. It is often common. Breeding takes place at water edges sheltered by thickets.

Hylarana taipehensis adapts to agricultural conditions; it could be threatened by pesticides. It is sometimes persecuted as a pest. In Taiwan, it is considered endangered. However, it is not considered threatened overall, and occurs in many protected areas. Scientists consider the population stable but note that it is sensitive to changes in habitat. Chemicals such as fertilizers, pesticides, and pollution can all harm this frog.
