= Amolops monticola =

Conservation status
- Least Concern (IUCN 3.1)

Scientific classification
- Kingdom: Animalia
- Phylum: Chordata
- Class: Amphibia
- Order: Anura
- Family: Ranidae
- Genus: Amolops
- Species: A. monticola

Binomial name
- Amolops monticola (Anderson, 1871)

Synonyms
- Hylorana monticola Anderson, 1871; Rana monticola (Anderson, 1871); Staurois monticola (Anderson, 1871)

Species of frog

Amolops monticola is a species of frog in the family Ranidae, the "true frogs". It is found in the Northeast India, eastern Nepal, and western China (Tibet, Yunnan), although there is some uncertainty regarding the Chinese records. It probably also occurs in the intervening Bhutan. Common names mountain sucker frog, mountain stream frog, mountain torrent frog, and mountain cascade frog have been coined for it.

== Description ==
Amolops monticola grow to a snout–vent length of 74 mm (2.9 in). As is characteristic for the Amolops monticola group, skin is smooth, dorsolateral folds are present, and the side of head is dark, with a light-colored upper lip stripe extending to the shoulder. The tympanum is distinct. The finger and toe tips bear discs. The toes are webbed. Males have paired vocal sac.

Tadpoles measure up to 66 mm (2.6 in) in total length, of which about two thirds is made up by the tail.

== Habitat and conservation ==
Amolops monticola occur in shaded stream rapids, but occasionally also in ponds. Its elevational range is 850–2,350 m (2,790–7,710 ft) above sea level. This frog lays eggs in stone crevices along the edges of streams, and on aquatic plants. It is not considered threatened by the International Union for Conservation of Nature (IUCN).
