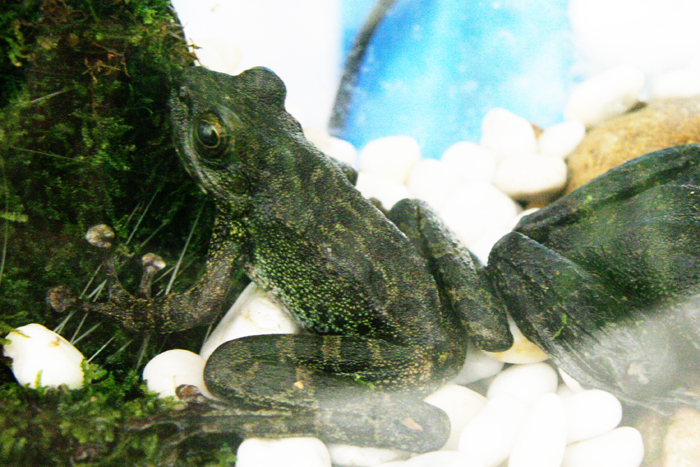

Conservation status
- Least Concern (IUCN 3.1)

Scientific classification
- Kingdom: Animalia
- Phylum: Chordata
- Class: Amphibia
- Order: Anura
- Family: Ranidae
- Genus: Amolops
- Species: A. afghanus

Binomial name
- Amolops afghanus (Günther, 1858)

Synonyms
- List: Ixalus kakhienensis Anderson, 1879; Polypedates afghana Günther, 1858; Rana afghana (Günther, 1858); Staurois afghanus (Günther, 1858)

= Kachin torrent frog =

Species of frog

Kachin torrent frog (Amolops afghanus) is a species of true frog native to Myanmar.

== Description ==
Kachin torrent frog is an obscure species and not much is known about it. However, from preserved specimens and written descriptions, it is known that it is a medium-sized, sometimes slender frog with a broad head. According to the original author, Albert Günther, the skin is smooth, but observations from iNaturalist depict multiple individuals with small knobs on the dorsal side. Furthermore, they are dark green with a dark, mottled pattern on their dorsal side. They also have dark, mottled, or clear bands on their limbs, which vary by observation. The ventral side appears to be light. The species shows clear sexual dimorphism in size. Females have an SVL of around 8 cm (3 in), while males have an SVL of around 5 cm (2 in).

== History and etymology ==
Kachin torrent frog was originally described briefly in 5 lines of text in 1858, where it was put in the genus Polypedates. The original author, Albert Günther, wrote that it was found in Afghanistan, and thus came the name. In 1865, it was then transferred to the genus Amolops by Edward Drinker Cope and got the name Amolops afghanus, which is the current designation. In 1879, a new species was discovered and it was called Ixalus kakhienensis, but it was later discovered that it was the existing species Amolops afghanus. In 1882, it was transferred to the genus Rana, where it remained for around 58 years until it was transferred to the genus Staurois. In 1966, the species was transferred for the last time by Robert F. Inger to the genus Amolops, and the species name was changed to afghanus once again. It belongs to the genus Amolops because of a certain trait in the tadpole that indicated that it was in reality a member of Amolops.

The common name comes from the fact that specimens have been collected from Kachin, Myanmar.
