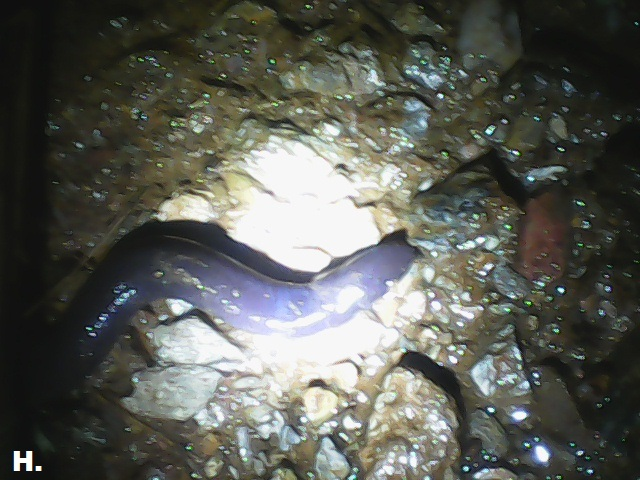
- Icthyophis sikkimensis from Korak Village, Chitwan district, Nepal

Conservation status
- Least Concern (IUCN 3.1)

Scientific classification
- Kingdom: Animalia
- Phylum: Chordata
- Class: Amphibia
- Order: Gymnophiona
- Clade: Apoda
- Family: Ichthyophiidae
- Genus: Ichthyophis
- Species: I. sikkimensis

Binomial name
- Ichthyophis sikkimensis Taylor, 1960
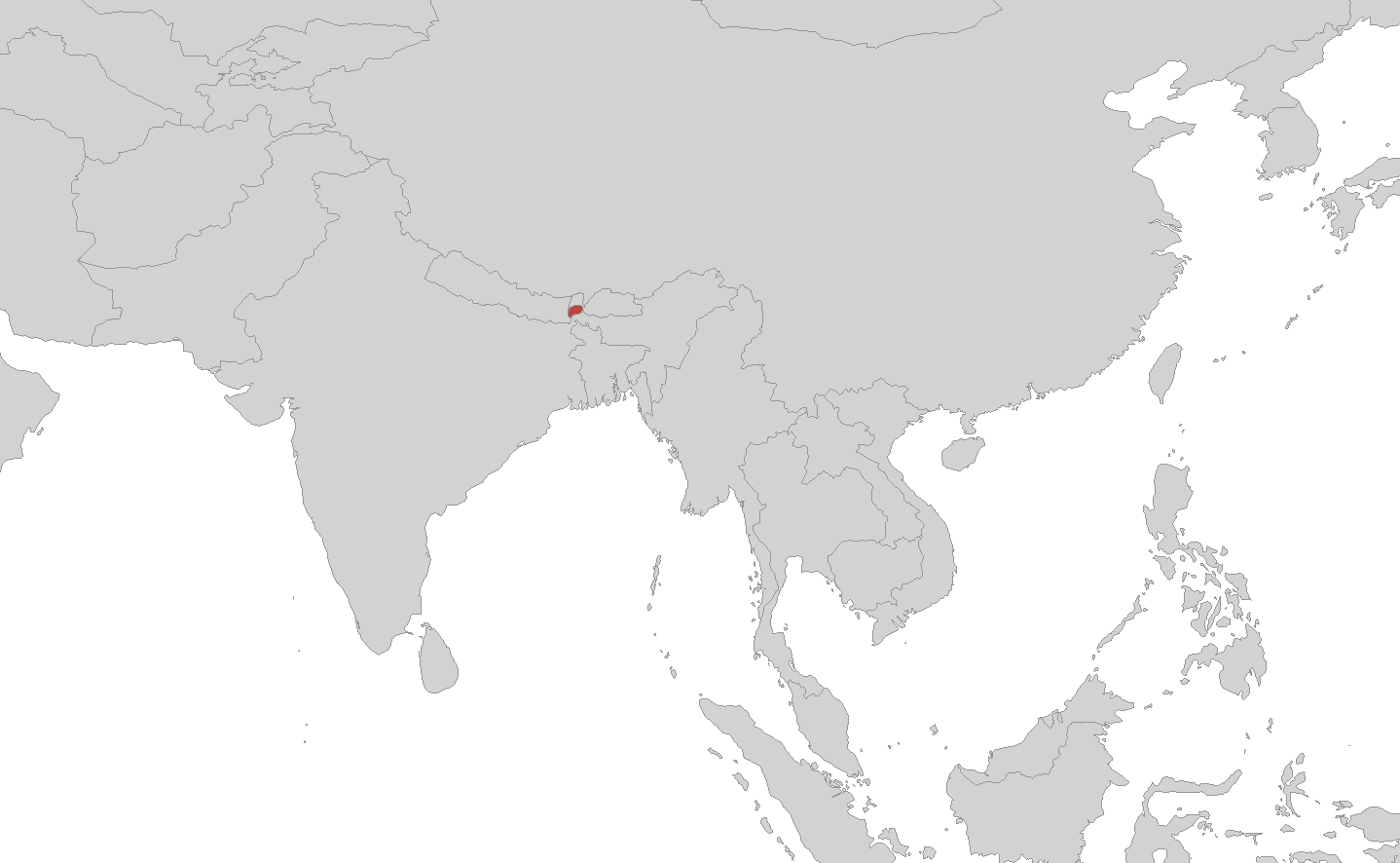
- Sikkimese caecilian range

= Ichthyophis sikkimensis =

Species of amphibian

Ichthyophis sikkimensis, the Sikkimese caecilian or Darjeeling caecilian, is a species of caecilian found in India (Sikkim and West Bengal), Nepal and possibly Bhutan. It was described by Edward Harrison Taylor in 1960.
