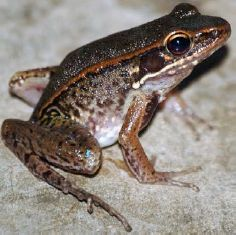
- Hylarana leptoglossa, Samdrup Jongkhar District, Bhutan

Conservation status
- Least Concern (IUCN 3.1)

Scientific classification
- Kingdom: Animalia
- Phylum: Chordata
- Class: Amphibia
- Order: Anura
- Family: Ranidae
- Genus: Hylarana
- Species: H. leptoglossa

Binomial name
- Hylarana leptoglossa (Cope, 1868)

Synonyms
- Hylorana granulosa Anderson, 1871; Hylorana leptoglossa Cope, 1868; Rana leptoglossa (Cope, 1868)

= Hylarana leptoglossa =

Long-tongued frog

Species of amphibian

Hylarana leptoglossa, commonly known as the long-tongued frog, is a species of true frog in the genus Hylarana. It is native to Bangladesh, northeastern India, Myanmar, and western Thailand. It is also known under the common names Cope's frog, Cope's Assam frog, palebrown small frog, and Assam forest frog. It has recently been reported also from Bhutan.

Hylarana leptoglossa live near streams in evergreen forests. They are generally found at moderate elevations, below 500 m (1,600 ft) in India and between 600–700 m (2,000–2,300 ft) in Thailand. Deforestation, fires, and agricultural encroachment can pose threats to this species.
