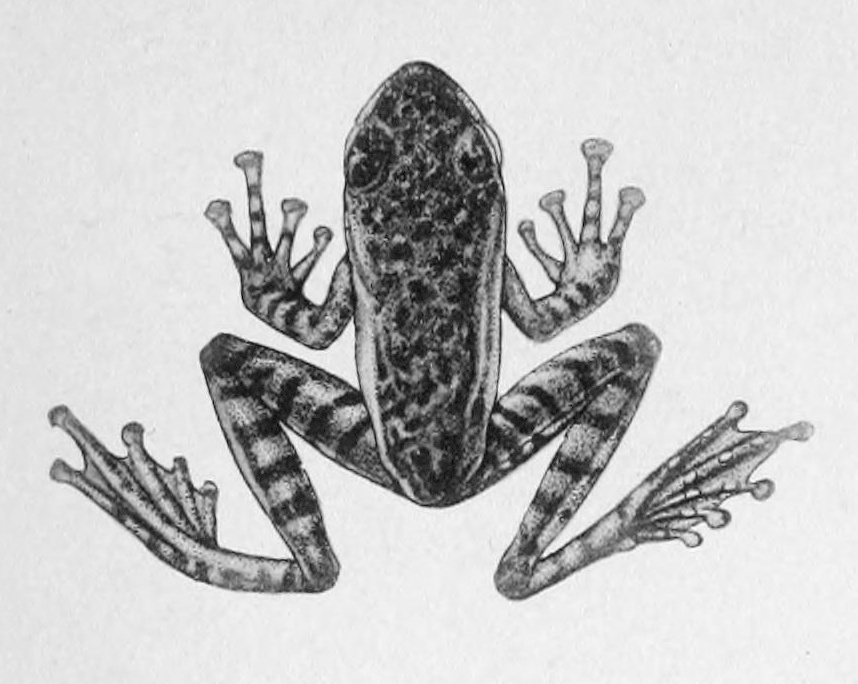

Conservation status
- Least Concern (IUCN 3.1)

Scientific classification
- Kingdom: Animalia
- Phylum: Chordata
- Class: Amphibia
- Order: Anura
- Family: Ranidae
- Genus: Amolops
- Species: A. marmoratus

Binomial name
- Amolops marmoratus (Blyth, 1855)

Synonyms
- Polypedates (?) marmoratus Blyth, 1855; Rana senchalensis Chanda, 1987; Amolops senchalensis (Chanda, 1987)

= Amolops marmoratus =

Species of amphibian

Amolops marmoratus is a species of ranid frog found in Asia. Its common names include marbled sucker frog, marbled cascade frog, Pegu torrent frog, and many others. The taxonomic status of many populations formerly assigned to this species is uncertain.

== Description ==
Amolops marmoratus shows a pronounced sexual dimorphism in size: males grow to snout-vent length of 38–48 mm (1.5–1.9 in) and females to 70–79 mm (2.8–3.1 in). It is a relatively small species among Amolops.

== Distribution and habitat ==
Amolops marmoratus is only known with certainty from Myanmar and likely from northern Thailand, though it may occur more widely. For example, International Union for Conservation of Nature (IUCN), using a less stringent delineation of the species, reported the species also from Bangladesh, Bhutan, China, India, and Nepal. While IUCN in its assessment in 2004 considered Amolops marmoratus to be of "Least Concern" in view of its wide distribution and presumed large population, recognizing higher biodiversity within the species warrants further assessment of its conservation status. A study in BMC Genomics suggests that the Marbled Cascade Frog in the Darjeeling Hills is genetically distinct and may be vulnerable.

As is typical for the genus Amolops, Amolops marmoratus lives near fast-flowing mountain streams.
