= Amolops himalayanus =

Conservation status
- Least Concern (IUCN 3.1)

Scientific classification
- Kingdom: Animalia
- Phylum: Chordata
- Class: Amphibia
- Order: Anura
- Family: Ranidae
- Genus: Amolops
- Species: A. himalayanus

Binomial name
- Amolops himalayanus (Boulenger, 1888)

Synonyms
- Rana himalayana Boulenger, 1888

Species of amphibian

Amolops himalayanus (Himalaya sucker frog, Himalaya cascade frog, or Himalaya frog) is a species of frog found in northeastern India and Nepal.

Whether this species is distinct from Amolops formosus is still debated. For example, the most recent IUCN assessment (2004) treated Amolops himalayanus as a synonym of Amolops formosus.
