= Rhacophorus tuberculatus =

Conservation status
- Data Deficient (IUCN 3.1)

Scientific classification
- Kingdom: Animalia
- Phylum: Chordata
- Class: Amphibia
- Order: Anura
- Family: Rhacophoridae
- Genus: Rhacophorus
- Species: R. tuberculatus

Binomial name
- Rhacophorus tuberculatus (Anderson, 1871)

Synonyms
- Polypedates tuberculatus Anderson, 1871

Species of frog

Rhacophorus tuberculatus is a species of frog in the family Rhacophoridae found in eastern and northeastern India (Arunachal Pradesh, Assam, Meghalaya, and West Bengal) and southeastern Tibet, China. It is known from tropical moist forests and bamboo forests. Breeding has been observed from bushes near to small forest ponds. It may hide in bamboo stems during the day. The species is threatened by habitat loss.

Rhacophorus tuberculatus grow to a length of about 45 mm (1.8 in).
