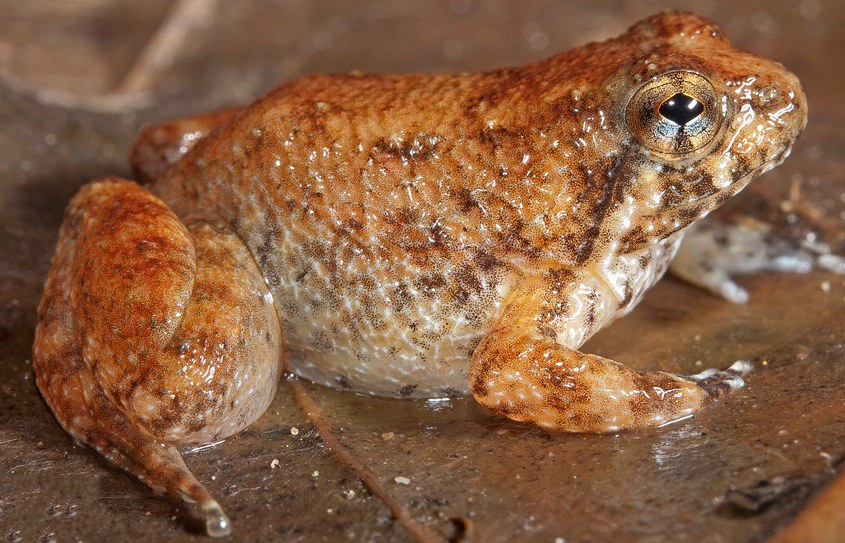

Conservation status
- Least Concern (IUCN 3.1)

Scientific classification
- Kingdom: Animalia
- Phylum: Chordata
- Class: Amphibia
- Order: Anura
- Family: Dicroglossidae
- Genus: Ingerana
- Species: I. borealis

Binomial name
- Ingerana borealis (Annandale, 1912)

Synonyms
- Micrixalus borealis Annandale, 1912; Occidozyga borealis (Annandale, 1912)

= Northern frog =

Species of amphibian

The northern frog (Ingerana borealis), or the Rotung oriental frog is a species of frog in the family Dicroglossidae. It is found in Bangladesh, Bhutan, northeastern India, Tibet, Nepal, and western Myanmar.

Its natural habitats are small, still waters and slow-moving waters in tropical moist forests. It is threatened by pollution due to agrochemicals but also by habitat loss and degradation.
