= Boulenophrys parva =

Conservation status
- Least Concern (IUCN 3.1)

Scientific classification
- Kingdom: Animalia
- Phylum: Chordata
- Class: Amphibia
- Order: Anura
- Family: Megophryidae
- Genus: Boulenophrys
- Species: B. parva

Binomial name
- Boulenophrys parva (Boulenger, 1893)

Synonyms
- Xenophrys monticola Günther, 1864; Leptobrachium parvum Boulenger, 1893; Xenophrys parva (Boulenger, 1893); Megalophrys parva (Boulenger, 1893); Megophrys parva

Species of horned frog

Boulenophrys parva is a species of horned frog found in South Asia, Southeast Asia, eastern India, Nepal, Bangladesh, Burma, western Thailand, southern China, (Yunnan and Guangxi) northern Laos and Vietnam. Perhaps because of its wide distribution, Boulenophrys parva is known under many common names, including concave-crowned horned toad, lesser stream horned frog, mountain horned frog, brown horn frog, Burmese spadefoot toad, and small spadefoot toad. It inhabits evergreen broadleaf forests alongside streams.

Males measure 43 mm (1.7 in) and females 45 mm (1.8 in) in length.
