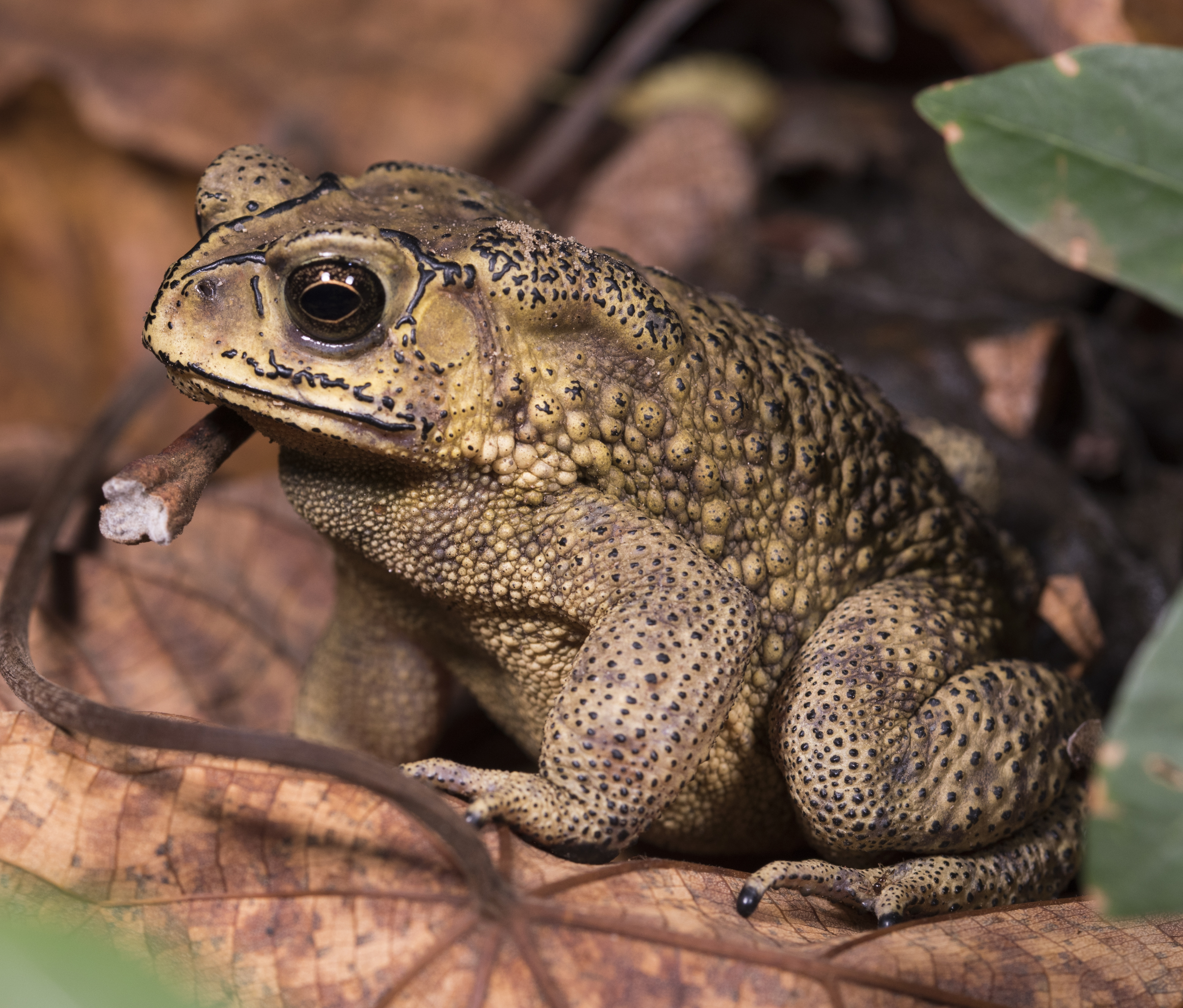

Conservation status
- Least Concern (IUCN 3.1)

Scientific classification
- Kingdom: Animalia
- Phylum: Chordata
- Class: Amphibia
- Order: Anura
- Family: Bufonidae
- Genus: Duttaphrynus
- Species: D. melanostictus

Binomial name
- Duttaphrynus melanostictus (Schneider, 1799)

Synonyms
- Bufo melanostictus

= Duttaphrynus melanostictus =

Species of amphibian

Duttaphrynus melanostictus is commonly called Asian common toad, Asian black-spined toad, Asian toad, black-spectacled toad, common Sunda toad, and Javanese toad. It is probably a complex of more than one true toad species that is widely distributed in South and Southeast Asia.

The species grows to about 20 cm (8 in) long. Asian common toads breed during the monsoon, and their tadpoles are black. Young toads may be seen in large numbers after monsoon rains finish.

== Distribution and habitat ==
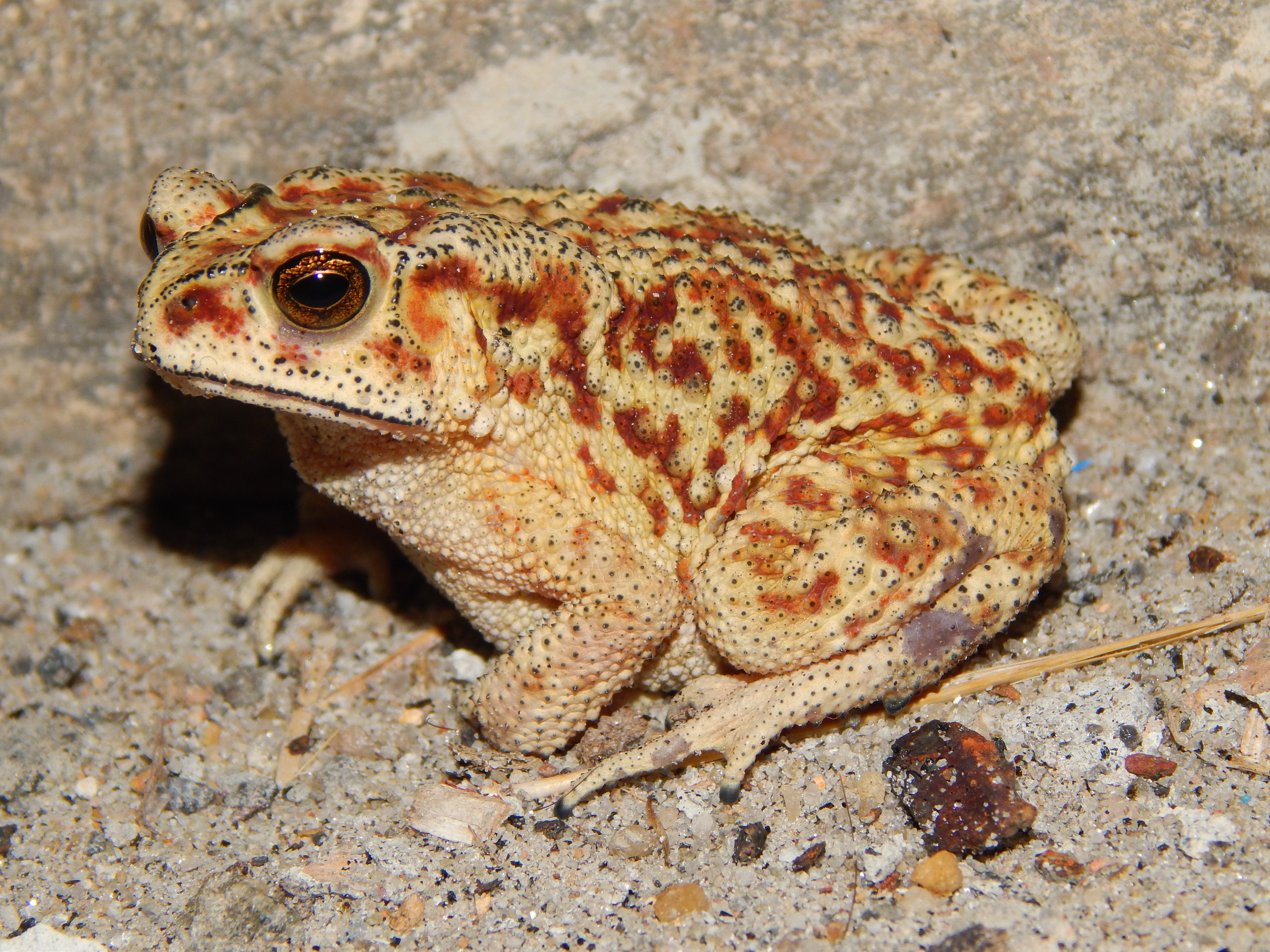
In the Western Ghats, India

Asian common toads occur widely from northern Pakistan through Nepal, Bangladesh, India including the Andaman and Nicobar Islands, Sri Lanka, Myanmar, Thailand, Laos, Vietnam, Cambodia, southern China, Taiwan, Hong Kong and Macau to Malaysia, Singapore, and the Indonesian islands of Sumatra, Java, Borneo, Anambas and Natuna Islands. They have been recorded from sea level up to 1,800 m (5,900 ft) altitude, and live mostly in disturbed lowland habitats, from upper beaches and riverbanks to human-dominated agricultural and urban areas. They are uncommon in closed forests.

== Characteristics ==
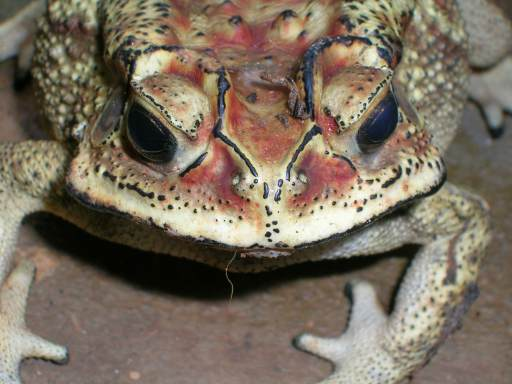
The wart patterns of the toads are unique and have been used for individual identification in studies.

The top of the head has several bony ridges, along the edge of the snout (canthal ridge), in front of the eye (preorbital), above the eye (supraorbital), behind the eye (postorbital), and a short one between the eye and ear (orbitotympanic). The snout is short and blunt, and the space between the eyes is broader than the upper eyelid width. The ear drum or tympanum is very distinct and is at least as wide as two-thirds the diameter of the eye. The first finger is often longer than the second and the toes are at least half webbed. A warty tubercle is found just before the junction of the thigh and shank (subarticular tubercle) and two moderate ones are on the shank (metatarsus). No skin fold occurs along the tarsus. The "knee" (tarsometatarsal articulation) reaches the tympanum or the eye when the hind leg is held parallel along the side of the body. The dorsal side is covered with spiny warts. The parotoids are prominent, kidney-shaped, or elliptical and elongated, and secrete milky white Bufotoxin. The dorsal side is yellowish or brownish and the spines and ridges are black. The underside is unmarked or spotted. Males have a subgular vocal sac and black pads on the inner fingers that help in holding the female during copulation.

== Ecology and behaviour ==
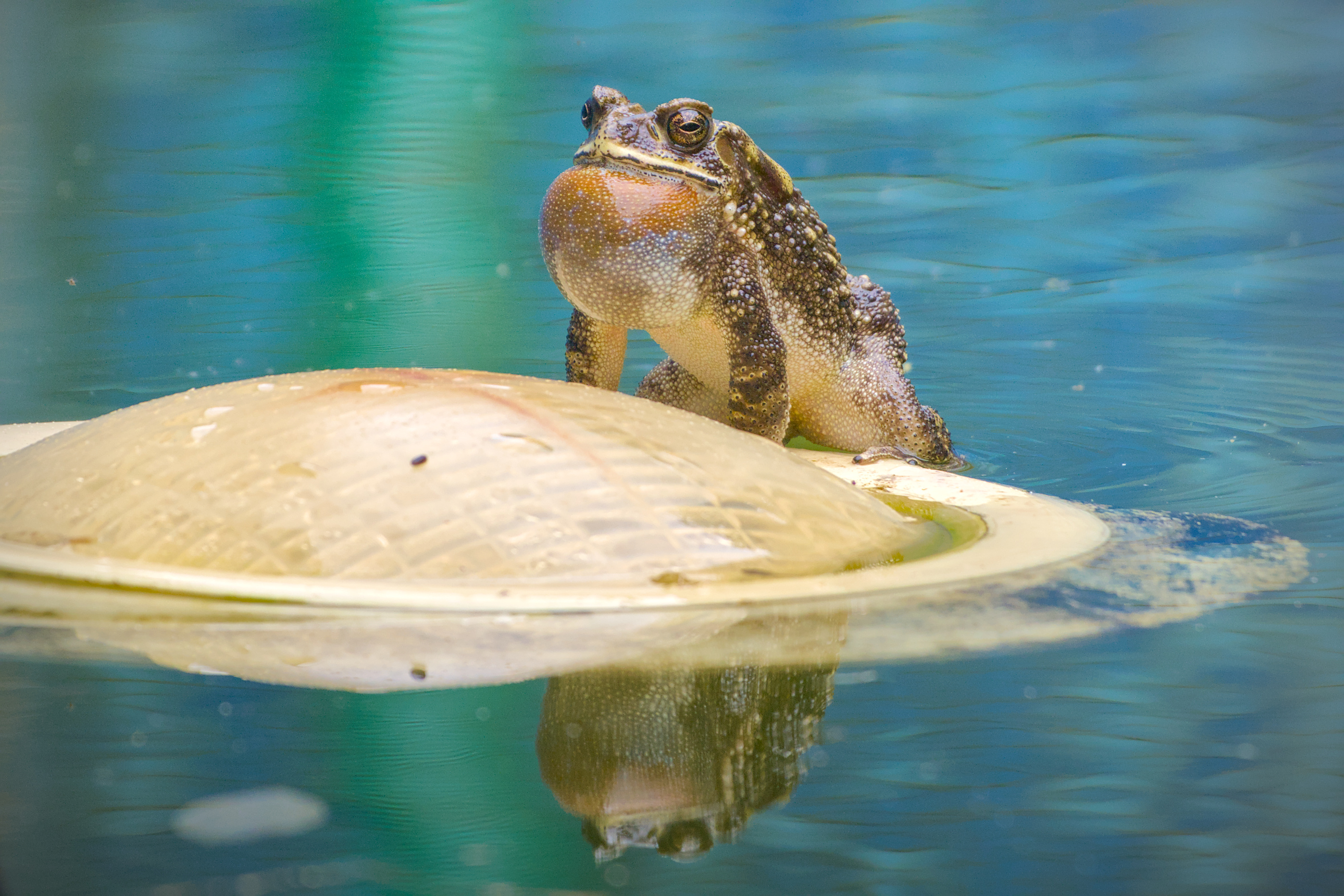
Vocalizing

Breeding pairs

Asian common toads breed in still and slow-flowing rivers and temporary and permanent ponds and pools. Adults are terrestrial and may be found under ground cover such as rocks, leaf litter, and logs, and are also associated with human habitations. The larvae are found in still and slow-moving waterbodies. They are often seen at night under street lamps, especially when winged termites swarm. They have been noted to feed on a wide range of invertebrates, including scorpions. Tadpoles grown in sibling groups metamorphosed faster than those that were kept in mixed groups. Tadpoles have been shown to be able to recognize kin. The 96h LC50 of commercial grade malathion for the tadpoles is 7.5 mg/L and sublethal levels of exposure can impair swimming.

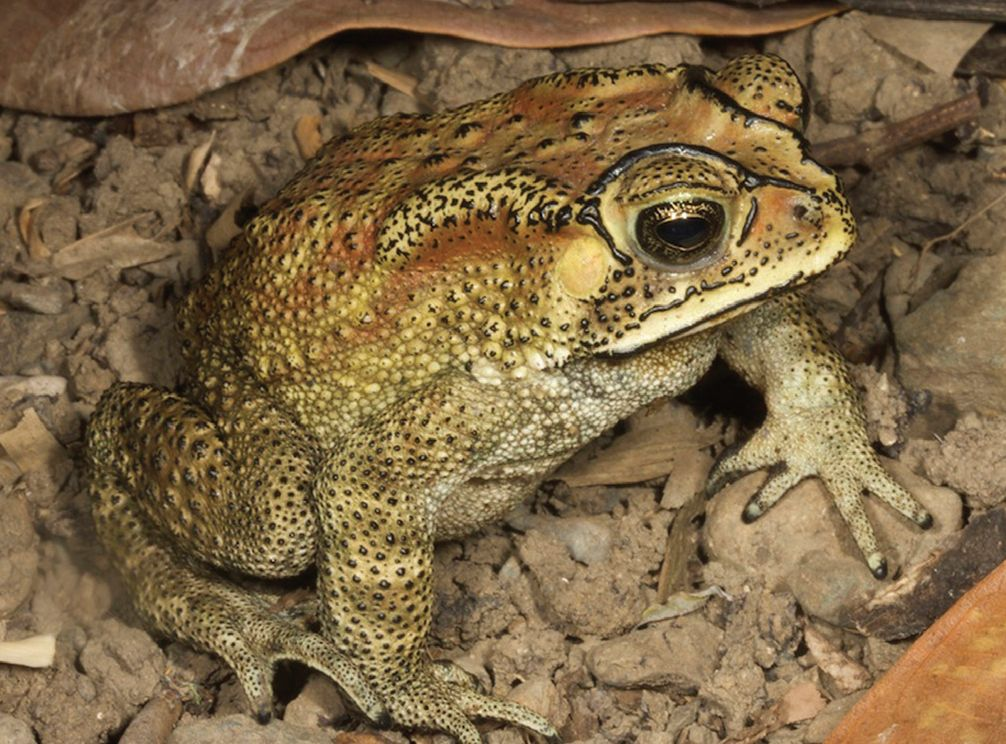

== Introductions ==
=== Madagascar ===
D. melanostictus arrived in Madagascar in 2011 at the port of Toamasina, and by 2014, was found in a 100 km^{2} (39 sq mi) zone around that city.

Since its discovery on the east coast, a grave fear has developed that if the Asian toad is not eradicated from Madagascar and stronger quarantines are not developed to prevent reinvasion, it could have comparable impacts to those of cane toads in Australia. Because – like Australia's – Madagascar's native predators have been isolated from bufonids since the Jurassic, they are thought to lack resistance to toad toxins as found in natural varanid and snake predators of D. melanostictus in its native range.

One study analyzed the sequences of the Na+/K+-ATPase gene (sodium-potassium pump) in dozens of Malagasy species that may be feeding on D. melanostictus. It was found that all but one out of 77 species failed to show evidence of resistance to the toad toxin, which strongly suggests that these alien toads can significantly impact the native Malagasy animal life and contribute to the worsening biodiversity crisis in the region.

Nevertheless, evidence from one Australian species, the bluetongue lizard, Tiliqua scincoides, produces the possibility that some Malagasy animals do possess resistance to bufotenin because almost identical cardiac glycosides are produced by native plants of the genus Bryophyllum.

=== Wallacea and West Papua ===
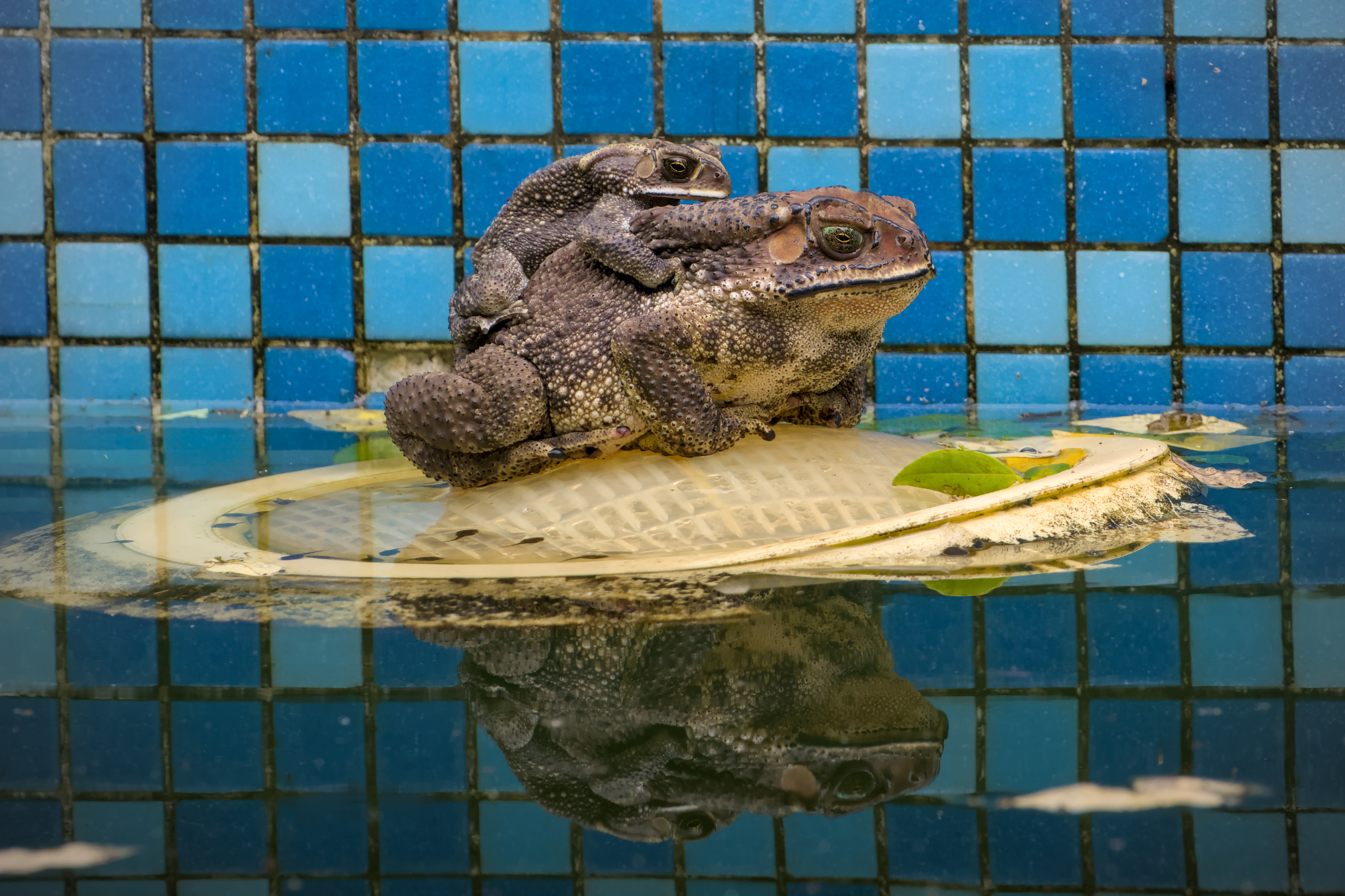
Amplexus

D. melanostictus was introduced to the Indonesian island of Bali in 1958, Sulawesi in 1974, then subsequently to Ambon, Lombok, Sumba, Sumbawa, Timor and Indonesian New Guinea at Manokwari on the Vogelkop Peninsula. The species is now common at Sentani in far eastern Papua Province. The absence of resistance to toad toxins in native snake and varanid predators means that these species could suffer severe declines from the inadvertent spread of the Asian common toad via human traffic, and the currently near threatened New Guinea quoll is also almost certain to be further affected in the lower-altitude portion of its range.

=== An unwanted species in Australia ===
The Asian common toad has been detected in Australia at least four times since 2000.

The Asian common toad has been described as one of Australia's "10 most unwanted" species, and "potentially more damaging than the cane toad". It may cause serious ecological problems due to "competition with native species, its potential to spread exotic parasites and pathogens and its toxicity". Like cane toads, the Asian common toad secretes toxins from glands in their backs to deter predators. These toxins would beyond reasonable doubt severely affect native predators, such as snakes, goannas and quolls.

The recent rate of incursions suggests a high likelihood of establishment in Australia. So, experts are calling for the Australian government to develop a "high-priority contingency plan" that includes stronger environmental quarantine and surveillance strategies.
