= Hylarana garoensis =

Conservation status
- Data Deficient (IUCN 3.1)

Scientific classification
- Kingdom: Animalia
- Phylum: Chordata
- Class: Amphibia
- Order: Anura
- Family: Ranidae
- Genus: Hylarana
- Species: H. garoensis

Binomial name
- Hylarana garoensis (Boulenger, 1920)

Synonyms
- Sylvirana garoensis (Smith, 1917); Rana danieli Pillai & Chanda, 1977; Rana garoensis Boulenger, 1920

Species of frog

Hylarana garoensis, commonly known as Boulenger's Garo hill frog, Daniel's frog, Swift cascade frog, Garo's hill frog or the Mawphlang frog, is an accepted species of frog in the family Ranidae. H. garoensis' natural habitats are subtropical or tropical moist lowland forests, subtropical or tropical moist shrubland, subtropical or tropical high-altitude grassland, and rivers; it is found in India and possibly Bangladesh. It is threatened by habitat loss.

This frog measures 32 mm in snout-vent length. The skin of the dorsum is gray-brown and that of the ventrum is nearly white . It has a long head and pointed snout. Its front legs are longer than the front legs of most frogs this size. It has webbed skin on its hind feet but none on its front feet, which also have discs.
