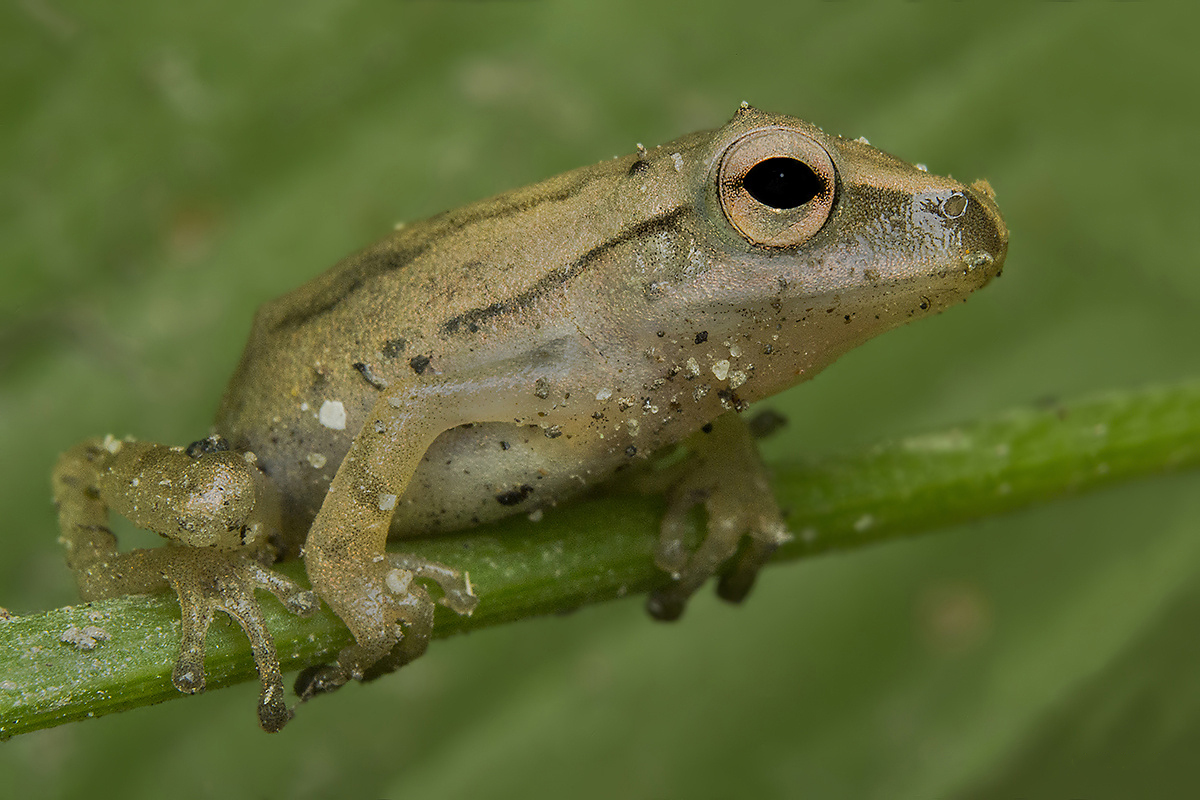
- Assam tree frog from Barpeta, Assam, India

Conservation status
- Least Concern (IUCN 3.1)

Scientific classification
- Kingdom: Animalia
- Phylum: Chordata
- Class: Amphibia
- Order: Anura
- Family: Rhacophoridae
- Genus: Chirixalus
- Species: C. simus

Binomial name
- Chirixalus simus Annandale, 1915

Synonyms
- Chiromantis simus (Annandale, 1915)

= Chirixalus simus =

Species of amphibian

Chirixalus simus, commonly known as Assam Asian frog, Assam tree frog, Annandale's tree frog, and Annandale's pigmy tree frog, is a species of frog in the family Rhacophoridae found in Bangladesh and north-eastern India (in Assam, Mizoram, and West Bengal states). Among other places, it has been recorded from Rajpur in the South 24 Parganas district and in the Darrang district of Assam.

== Habitat ==
Chirixalus simus is a reasonably abundant species. They are arboreal frogs associated with scrub forest habitats. They breed in pools, with eggs deposited on vegetation.

== Description ==
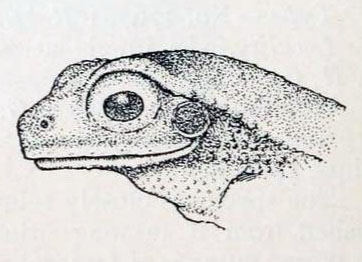
Illustration of the type specimen

Chirixalus simus are small frogs that grow to a snout-vent length of 19–23 mm (0.75–0.91 in) in males and about 27 mm (1.1 in) in females. Male frogs call from grasses about 1 metre above the water. They make foam nests that hang above the water.
