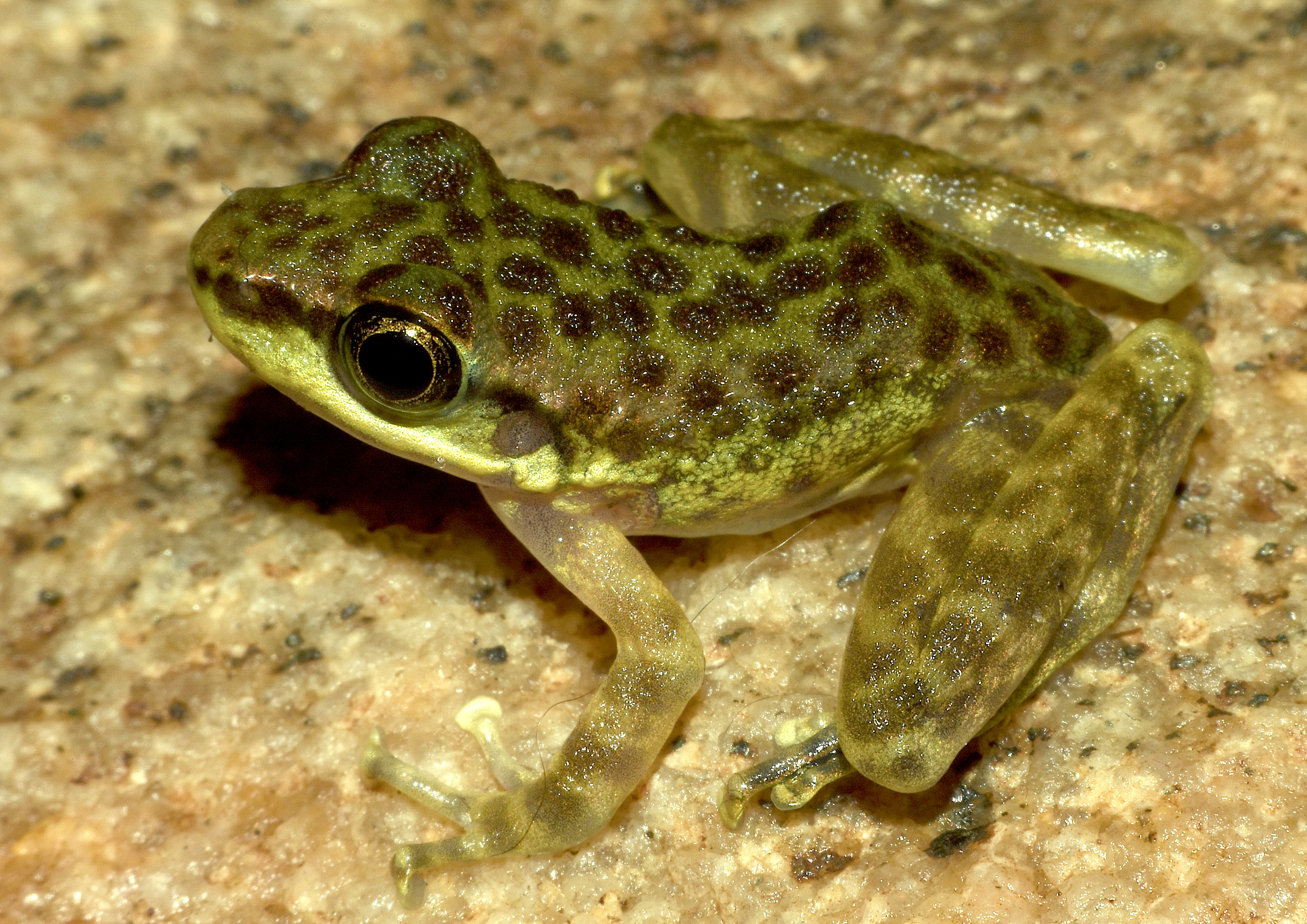
- Amolops gerbillus

Conservation status
- Least Concern (IUCN 3.1)

Scientific classification
- Kingdom: Animalia
- Phylum: Chordata
- Class: Amphibia
- Order: Anura
- Family: Ranidae
- Genus: Amolops
- Species: A. gerbillus

Binomial name
- Amolops gerbillus (Annandale, 1912)

Synonyms
- Rana gerbillus Annandale, 1912

= Amolops gerbillus =

Species of amphibian

Amolops gerbillus, also known as the Yembung sucker frog or the gerbil stream frog, is a species of frog found in South Asia. It is native to Bhutan, northern and northeastern India, Myanmar, eastern Nepal and Tibet, where it is typically found in the south-facing foothills of the Himalayas, along high-elevation hillstreams, mountain creeks and ponds. It is an amphibious species, spending equal time basking in the sun and swimming and hunting in the water.
