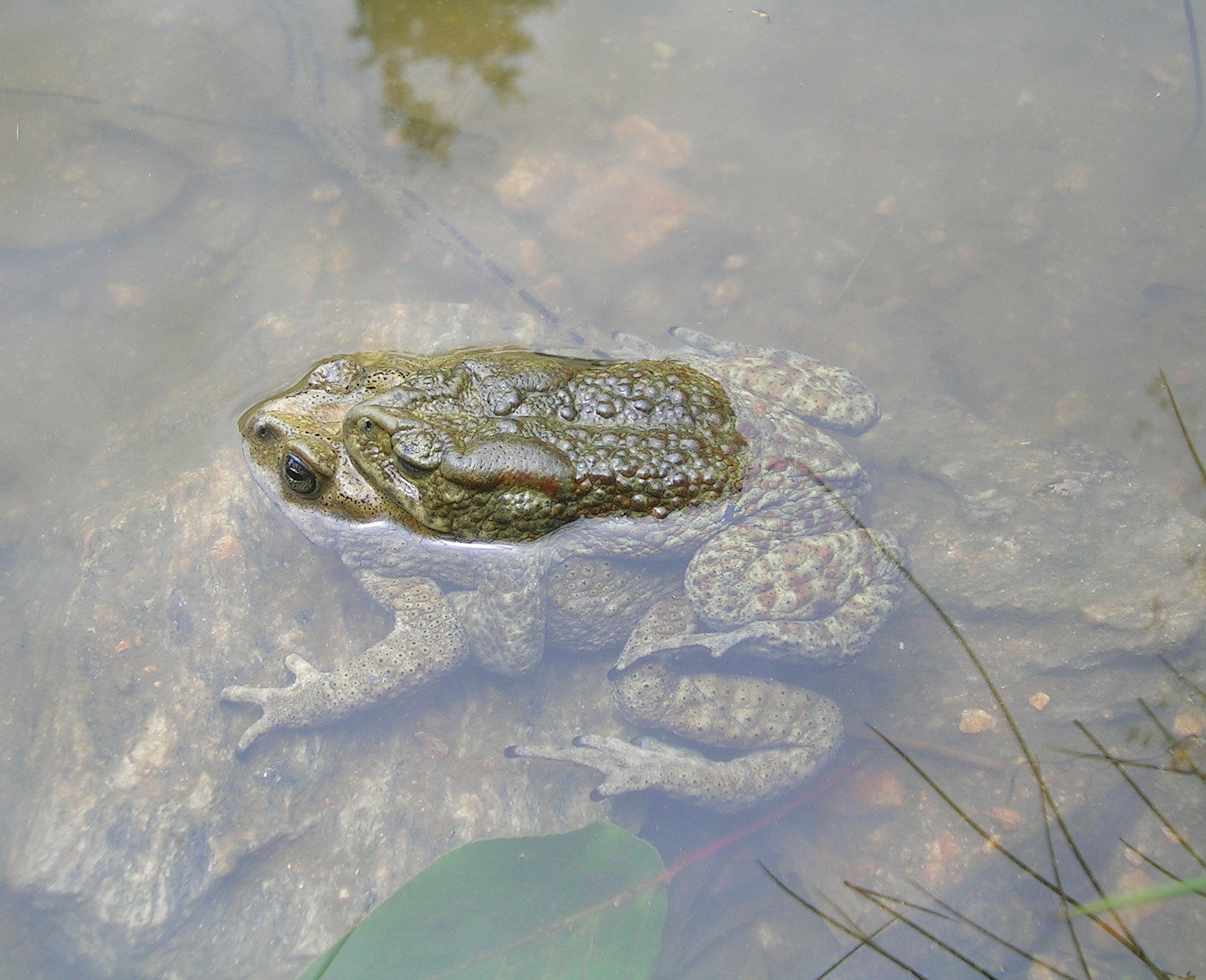
- Pair in amplexus (Munsiari, Uttaranchal, India)

Conservation status
- Least Concern (IUCN 3.1)

Scientific classification
- Kingdom: Animalia
- Phylum: Chordata
- Class: Amphibia
- Order: Anura
- Family: Bufonidae
- Genus: Duttaphrynus
- Species: D. himalayanus

Binomial name
- Duttaphrynus himalayanus (Günther, 1864)

Synonyms
- Bufo melanostictus var. himalayanus Günther, 1864; Bufo himalayanus Günther, 1864; Bufo abatus Ahl, 1925; Bufo cyphosus Ye, 1977; Duttaphrynus cyphosus (Ye, 1977)

= Duttaphrynus himalayanus =

Himalayan toad

Species of amphibian

Duttaphrynus himalayanus, also known as the Himalaya toad, Himalayan toad, Himalayan broad-skulled toad, and Günther's high altitude toad (among others), is a species of toad that is widely distributed throughout the Himalayan mountains. The Yunnanese populations are sometimes considered a separate species, Duttaphrynus cyphosus.

== Description ==
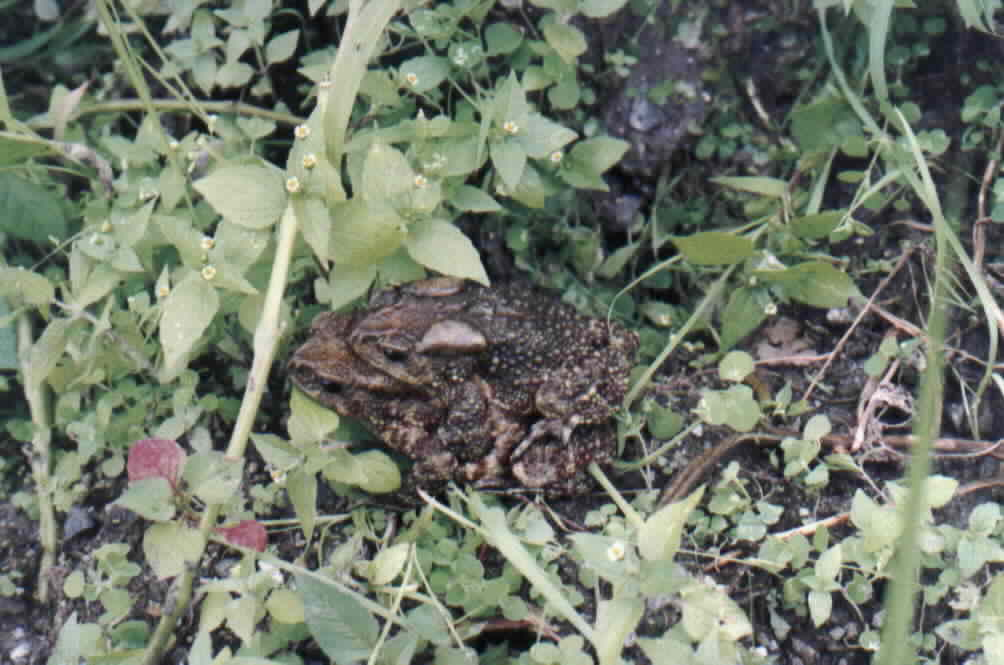

The crown is deeply concave, with low, blunt supraorbital ridges. The snout is short and blunt, the interorbital space is broader than the upper eyelid, and the tympanum is very small and rather indistinct. The first finger does not extend beyond the second, the toes are half or two-thirds webbed, with single subarticular tubercles, two moderate metatarsal tubercles, and no tarsal fold. The tarsometatarsal articulation reaches the anterior border of the eye or the tip of the snout. Upper parts have irregular, distinctly porous warts, the parotoids are very prominent, large, and elongated, at least as long as the head. They are uniform brown in color. Males do not have vocal sacs.

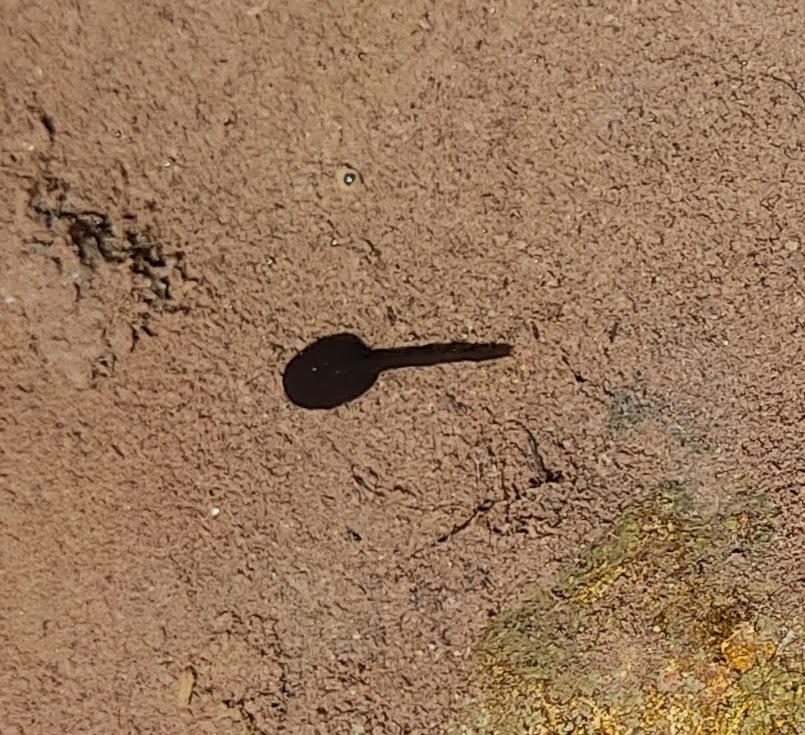
Tadpole

From snout to vent, they measure 130 mm (5 in).

== Diet ==
This frog has been seen eating grasshoppers, moths, ants, and other invertebrates.

== Distribution and habitat ==
This species is found from Azad Kashmir in Pakistan through northern India and adjacent Bangladesh, Bhutan, and Nepal to southern and central Tibet and northwestern Yunnan in China. Its range might extend into Myanmar. It occurs at the elevations of 1,000–3,500 m (3,300–11,500 ft) above sea level. It inhabits mountain forests and shrubland near streams, and also is found in the vicinity of seepages and fields. This high-altitude species can also occur in the evergreen forests of the foothills. It is largely a terrestrial toad. Breeding takes place in hill streams, small pools, and puddles.

This frog has been found in many protected parks: Tarai National Park, Chitwan National Park, Khunjgerab National Park, Central Karakorum National Park Jigme Dorji National Park, and Jigme Khesar Strict Nature Reserve. It has previously been recorded in Namdhapa National Park, Mouling National Park, and Dihang-Dibang Biosphere Reserve.
