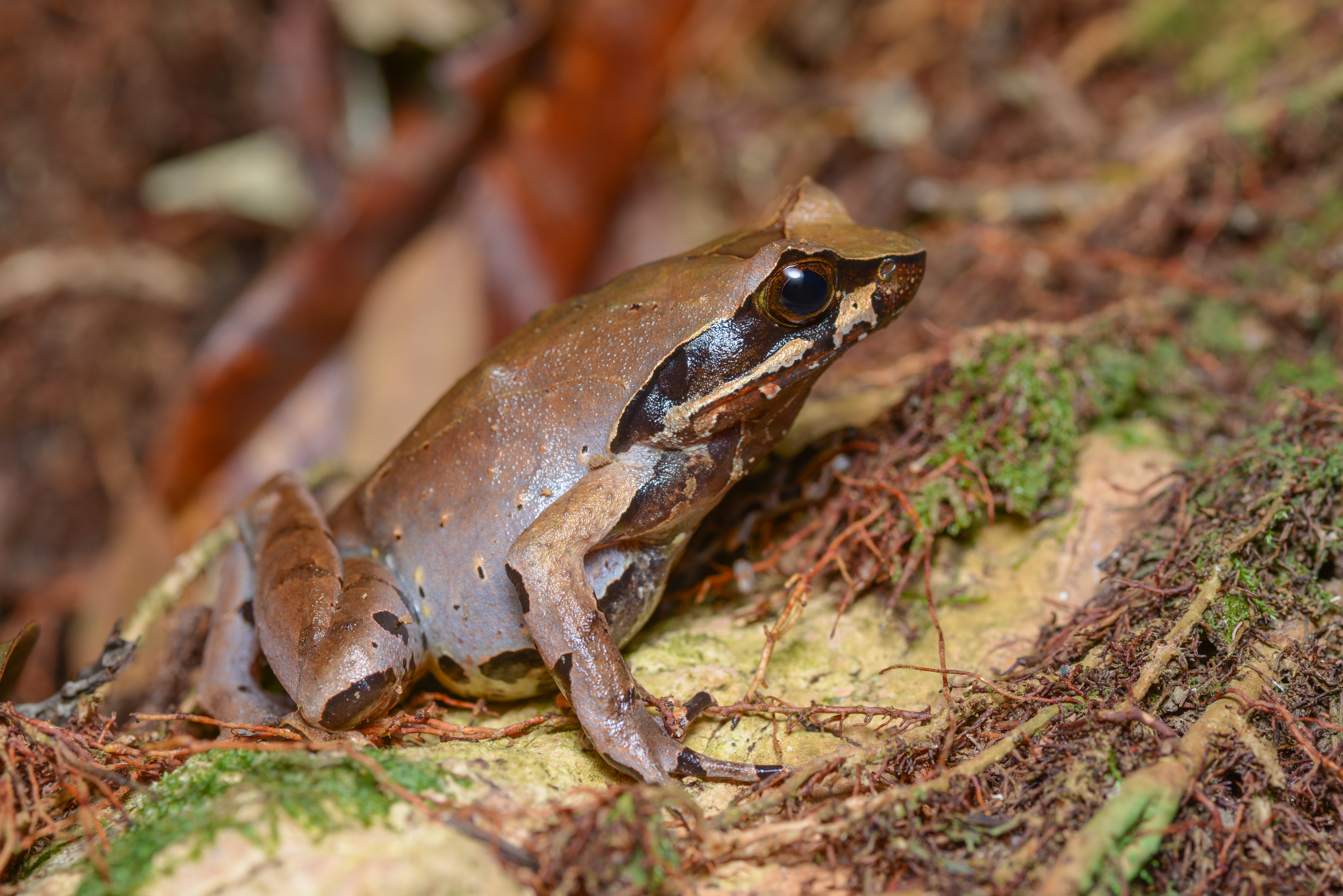
- From Kaeng Krachan National Park, Thailand

Conservation status
- Least Concern (IUCN 3.1)

Scientific classification
- Kingdom: Animalia
- Phylum: Chordata
- Class: Amphibia
- Order: Anura
- Family: Megophryidae
- Genus: Xenophrys
- Species: X. major

Binomial name
- Xenophrys major (Boulenger, 1908)

Synonyms
- Megophrys major Boulenger, 1908

= Xenophrys major =

Species of amphibian

Xenophrys major is a species of toad found in northeastern India, Burma, Thailand, Cambodia, Laos, Vietnam, and southern China. It has recently been reported also from Bhutan.

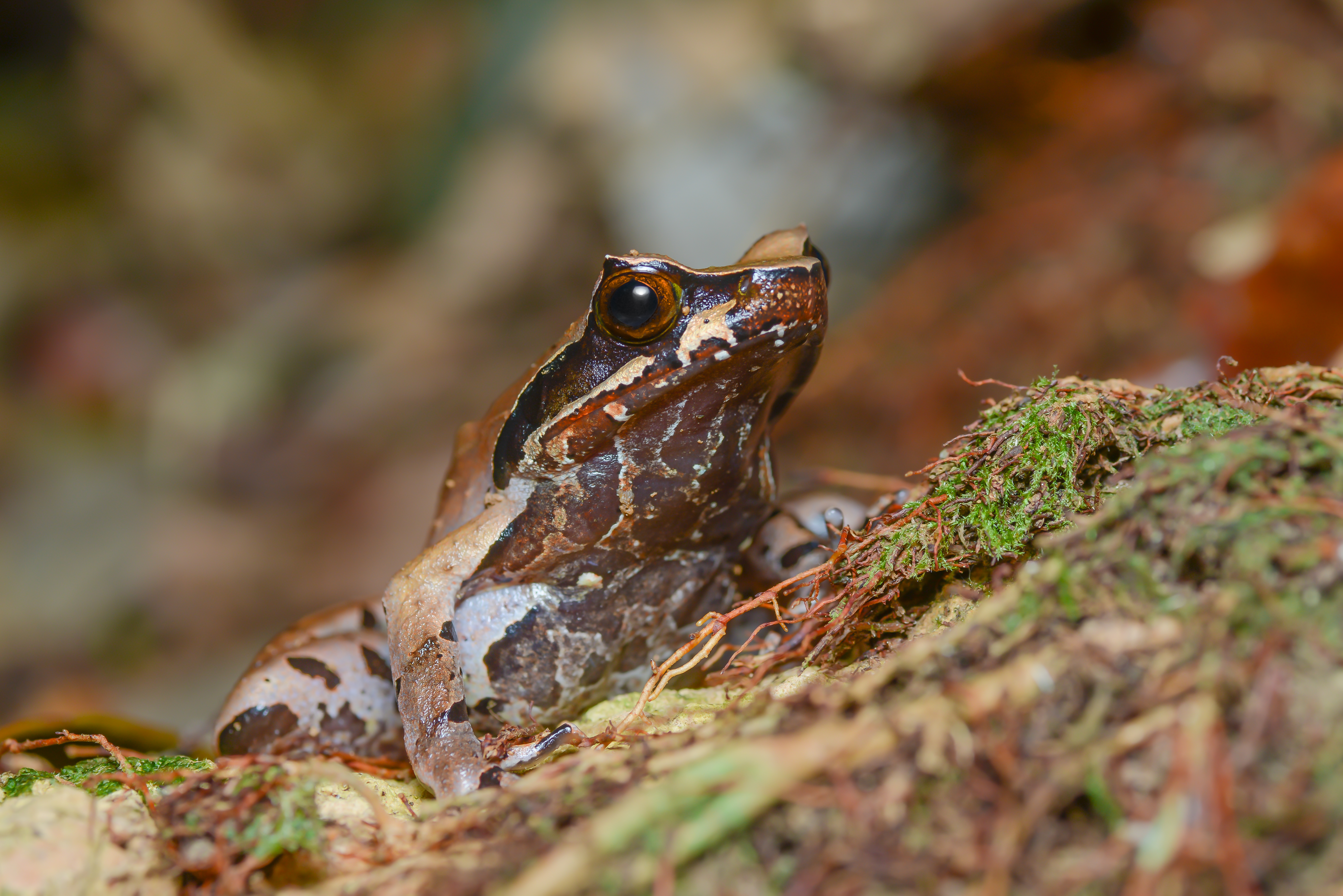
Xenophrys major, Kaeng Krachan National Park

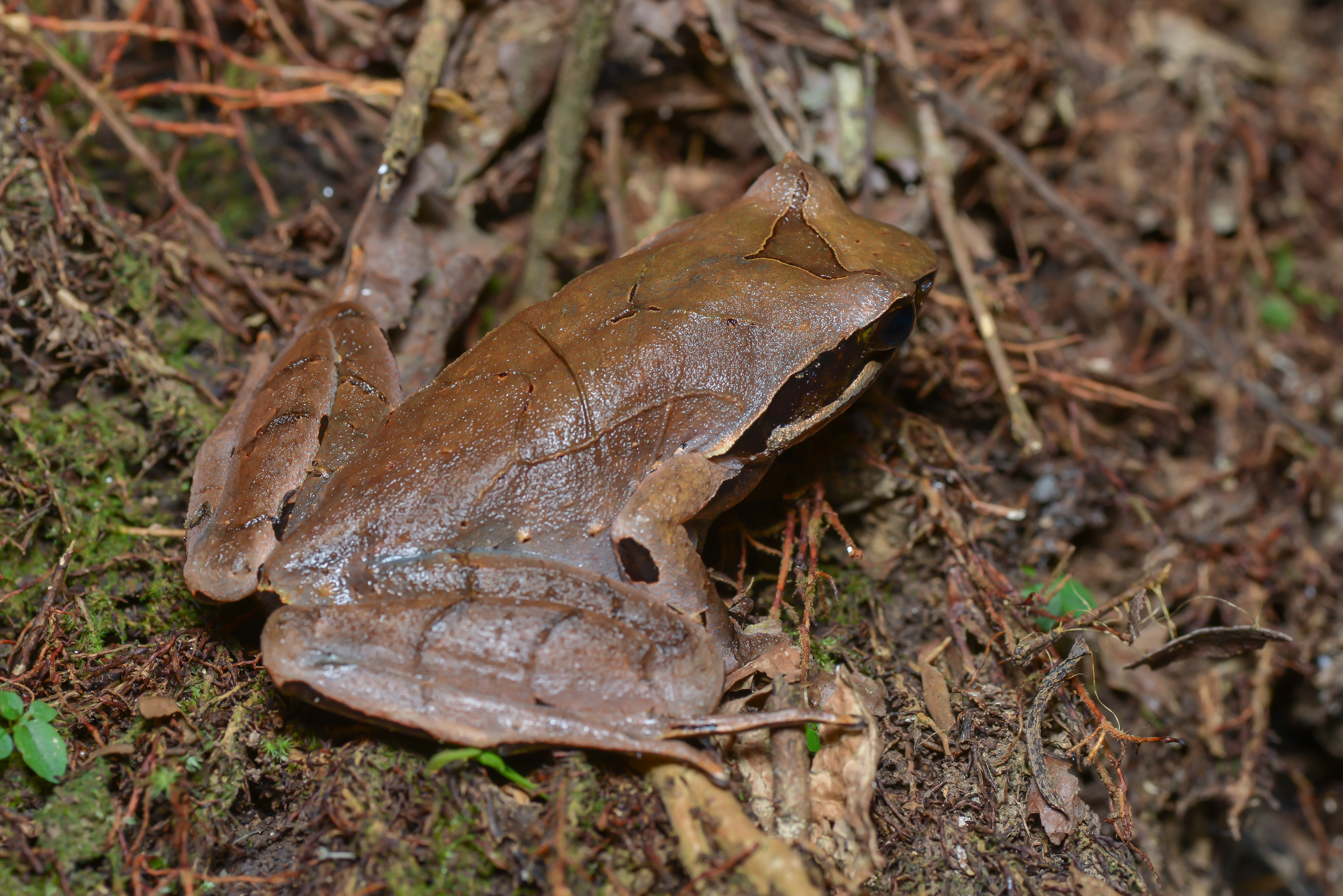
Xenophrys major, Kaeng Krachan National Park
