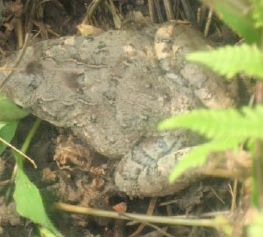
- Minervarya teraiensis from Sarpang District, Bhutan

Conservation status
- Least Concern (IUCN 3.1)

Scientific classification
- Kingdom: Animalia
- Phylum: Chordata
- Class: Amphibia
- Order: Anura
- Family: Dicroglossidae
- Genus: Minervarya
- Species: M. teraiensis

Binomial name
- Minervarya teraiensis (Dubois, 1984)

Synonyms
- Rana teraiensis Dubois, 1984; Fejervarya teraiensis (Dubois, 1984)

= Minervarya teraiensis =

Species of amphibian

Minervarya teraiensis (Terai cricket frog or Terai wart(y) frog) is a species of frog that is found in southern Nepal, adjacent Sikkim and northeastern India, and southeastern and central Bangladesh. It has recently been reported also from Bhutan. It is a common species associated with open grasslands, often found close to permanent pools and streams.
