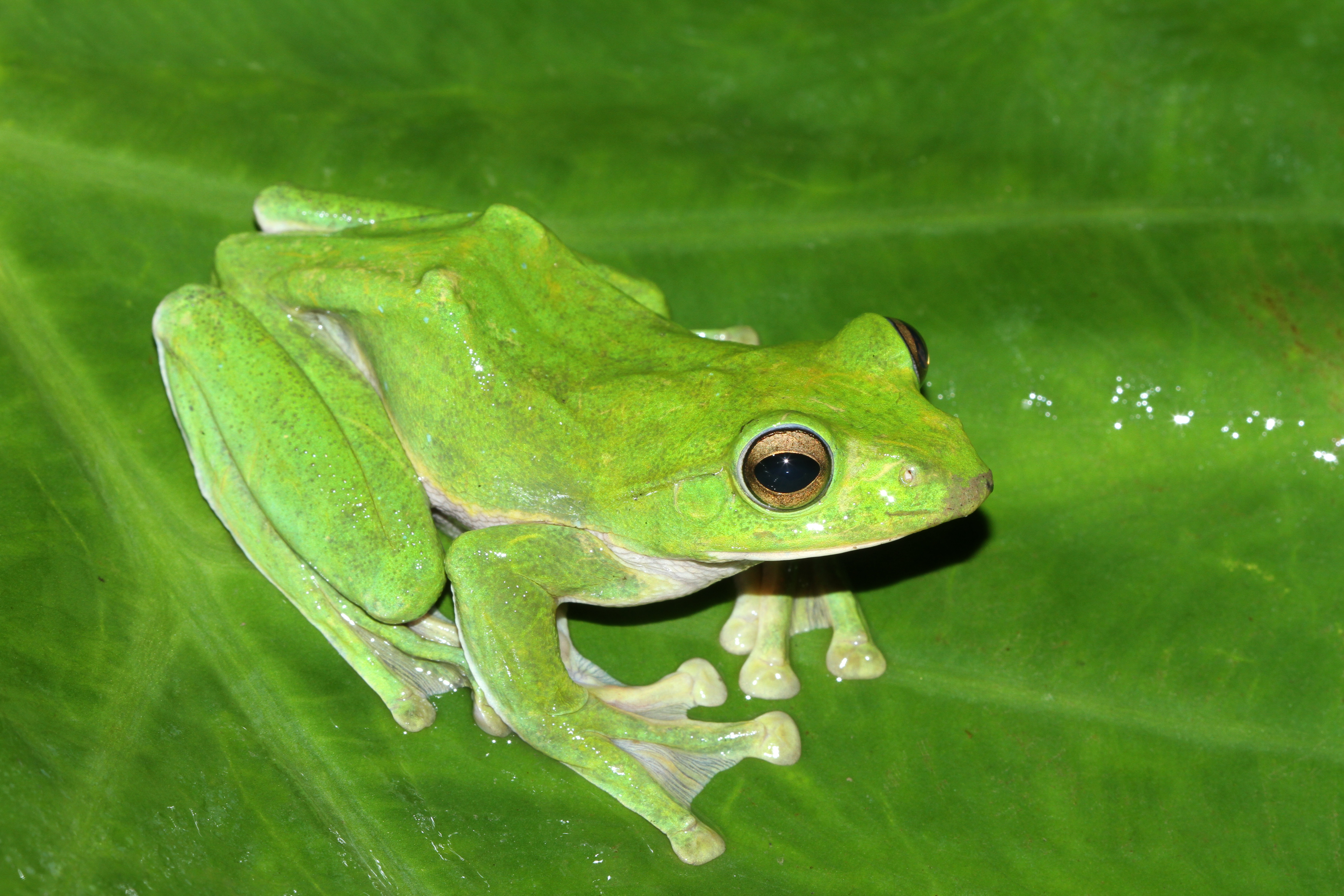

Conservation status
- Least Concern (IUCN 3.1)

Scientific classification
- Kingdom: Animalia
- Phylum: Chordata
- Class: Amphibia
- Order: Anura
- Family: Rhacophoridae
- Genus: Zhangixalus
- Species: Z. smaragdinus

Binomial name
- Zhangixalus smaragdinus (Blyth, 1852)
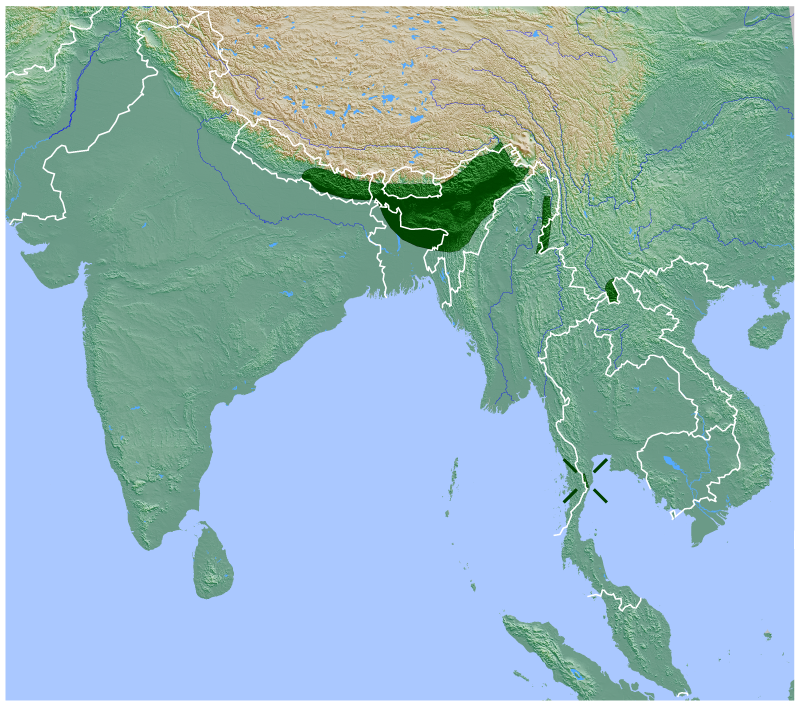
- Rhacophorus maximus range.

Synonyms
- Rhacophorus maximus Günther, 1858; Rhacophorus gigas Jerdon, 1870

= Zhangixalus smaragdinus =

Species of amphibian

Zhangixalus smaragdinus (common names: Nepal flying frog, Günther's tree frog, giant treefrog, and others) is a species of frog in the family Rhacophoridae found in southwestern China (Yunnan, Tibet), north-eastern India, Nepal, western Thailand, and northern Vietnam, and possibly in Bangladesh.

Zhangixalus smaragdinus lives in lowland to submontane moist evergreen forests. It lays eggs in foam nests built above pools and ponds. Outside the breeding season it is arboreal and lives high in the canopy. This frog has been observed between 500 and 2,000 metres (1,640 and 6,560 ft) above sea level.

It is classified as of least concern of extinction by the IUCN because of its large range, which includes protected parks in several countries: Xishuangbanna National Nature Reserve, Dihang-Dibang Biosphere Reserve, Royal Manas National Park, Phibsoo Wildlife Sanctuary, Jigme Singye Wangchuck National Park, Phu Luang Wildlife Sanctuary, Thong Pha Phum National Park, Kaeng Krachan National Park, and Kui Buri National Park. In India, people occasionally catch this frog as subsistence food.

== Original description ==
- Annemarie Ohler; Kaushik Deuti (2018). "Polypedates smaragdinus Blyth, 1852—a senior subjective synonym of Rhacophorus maximus Günther, 1858". Zootaxa (Abstract). 4375 (2): 273–280. doi:10.11646/zootaxa.4375.2.7. PMID 29689774.
