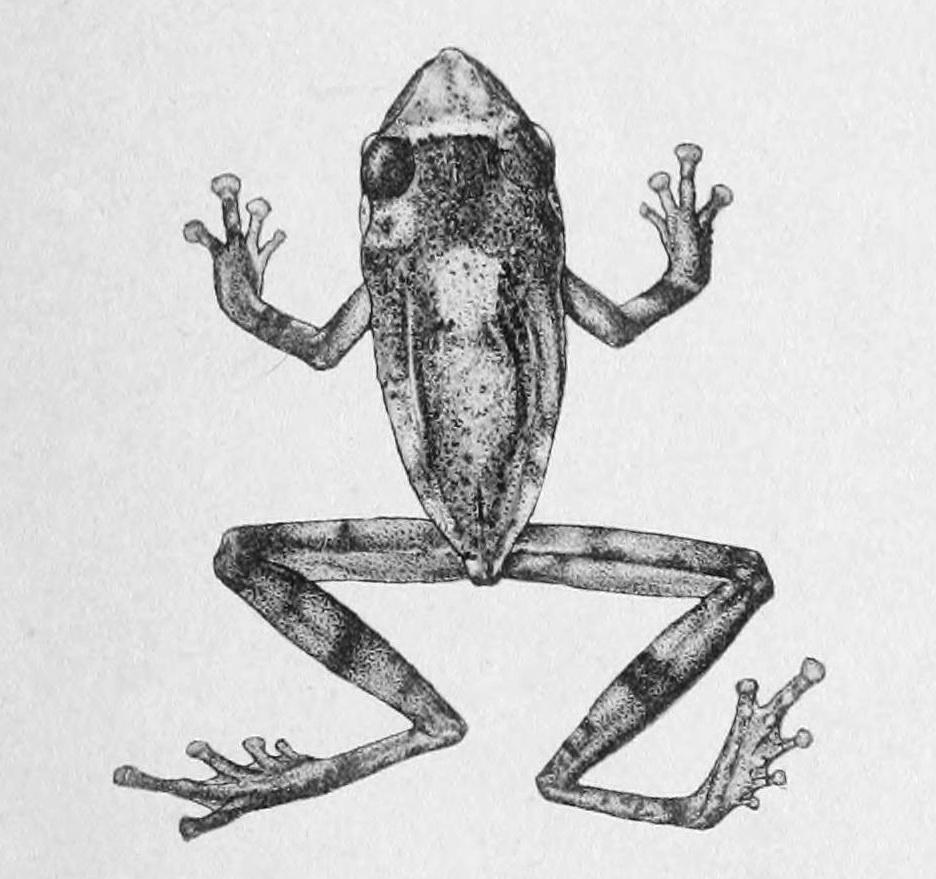

Conservation status
- Least Concern (IUCN 3.1)

Scientific classification
- Kingdom: Animalia
- Phylum: Chordata
- Class: Amphibia
- Order: Anura
- Family: Rhacophoridae
- Genus: Raorchestes
- Species: R. annandalii

Binomial name
- Raorchestes annandalii (Boulenger, 1906)

Synonyms
- Ixalus annandalii Boulenger, 1906; Philautus annandalii (Boulenger, 1906); Pseudohilautus annandalii (Boulenger, 1906)

= Raorchestes annandalii =

Species of amphibian

Raorchestes annandalii (known also as Annandale's bush frog, coppersmith frog, Himalaya bubble-nest frog, or Himalaya foam nest frog) is a species of frog in the family Rhacophoridae. It is found in the eastern Himalayas in India, Nepal, and Bhutan. Its natural habitats are subtropical or tropical moist montane forests and subtropical or tropical high-altitude shrubland. It has been observed as high as 2700 meters above sea level. It relies on saltation to move around.

This frog has been found in grasses near human habitation. This frog breeds through direct development with no free-swimming tadpole stage.

Scientists classify this frog as least concern of extinction because of its large range and presumed large population, but there are some local declines. Pollution from tea plantations may do the population some harm. The frog's range includes two protected parks: Namdapha Wildlife Sanctuary and Dibang Wildlife Reserve.
