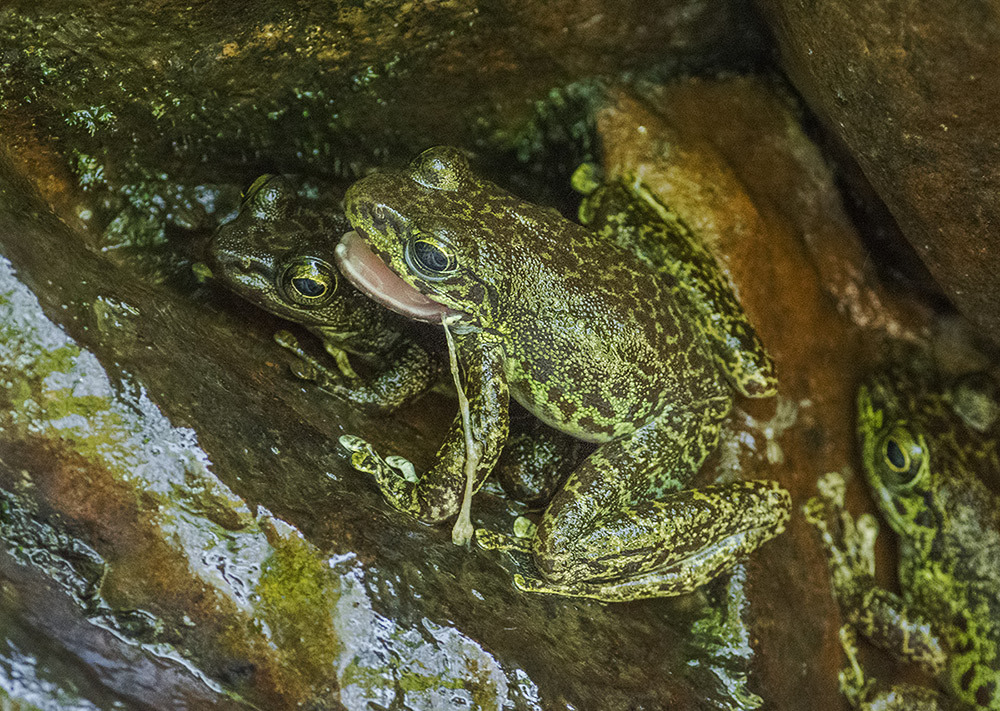

Conservation status
- Least Concern (IUCN 3.1)

Scientific classification
- Kingdom: Animalia
- Phylum: Chordata
- Class: Amphibia
- Order: Anura
- Family: Ranidae
- Genus: Amolops
- Species: A. formosus

Binomial name
- Amolops formosus (Günther, 1876)

Synonyms
- Polypedates formosus Günther, 1876 "1875"; Rana formosa (Günther, 1876)

= Amolops formosus =

Species of amphibian

Amolops formosus, also known as Assam sucker frog, beautiful stream frog, Assam cascade frog, or hill stream frog, is a species of frog found in high gradient streams of northern India, northern Bangladesh, and Nepal, possibly also Bhutan, although these records may represent confusion between Amolops himalayanus and this species; the latest available IUCN assessment from 2004 treats A. himalayanus as a synonym of A. formosus.

== Description ==
Adult males measure, based on the holotype only, 64 mm (2.5 in) and females measure 63–73 mm (2.5–2.9 in) in snout–vent length. The head is relatively wide. The tympanum is small but distinct. The fingers have no webbing while the toes are fully webbed; both fingers and toes bear discs. Skin is smooth. The dorsum is green with irregular distinct chocolate-coloured blotches with yellow dots. The ventral parts are light with a greenish abdomen.

== Habitat and conservation ==
Amolops formosus is a rare frog associated with streams and riparian vegetation within tropical evergreen forest at elevations of 1,000–2,508 m (3,281–8,228 ft) above sea level. It is threatened by habitat loss caused by deforestation and dams. It is present in the Namdapha National Park and Dibang Wildlife Sanctuary in Arunachal Pradesh (India).
