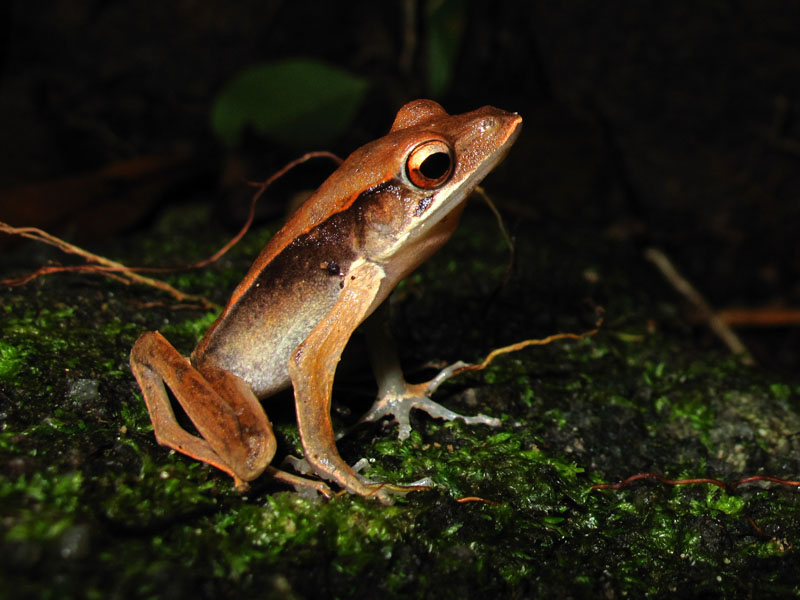

Conservation status
- Least Concern (IUCN 3.1)

Scientific classification
- Kingdom: Animalia
- Phylum: Chordata
- Class: Amphibia
- Order: Anura
- Family: Ranidae
- Genus: Clinotarsus
- Species: C. alticola

Binomial name
- Clinotarsus alticola (Boulenger, 1882)

Synonyms
- Hylorana pipiens Jerdon, 1870; Rana alticola Boulenger, 1882; Nasirana alticola (Boulenger, 1882); Clinotarsus alticolus (misspelling)

= Clinotarsus alticola =

Species of amphibian

Clinotarsus alticola is a species of frog in the family Ranidae. Common names for this species include: Assam Hills frog, Annandale's frog, pointed-headed frog, palebrown stream frog, hill frog, point-nosed frog, and high-altitude frog. It is found in Hills of Meghalaya and northeastern India (Assam, Meghalaya, Mizoram, Nagaland, Tripura, and West Bengal) to northern Bangladesh, possibly into Bhutan and Nepal.

== Habitat ==
Clinotarsus alticola inhabit evergreen forests near large streams (the habitat for their tadpoles) in hill areas, usually near waterfalls.

== Description ==
Clinotarsus alticola are sexually dimorphic: males are 32–47 mm (1.3–1.9 in) in snout–vent length and females 43–61 mm (1.7–2.4 in). The advertisement call of males is a bird-like "chirp". In breeding sites, males greatly outnumber females and attempt to dislodge one another from the backs of females. Outside the breeding season adult Clinotarsus alticola are rarely encountered.

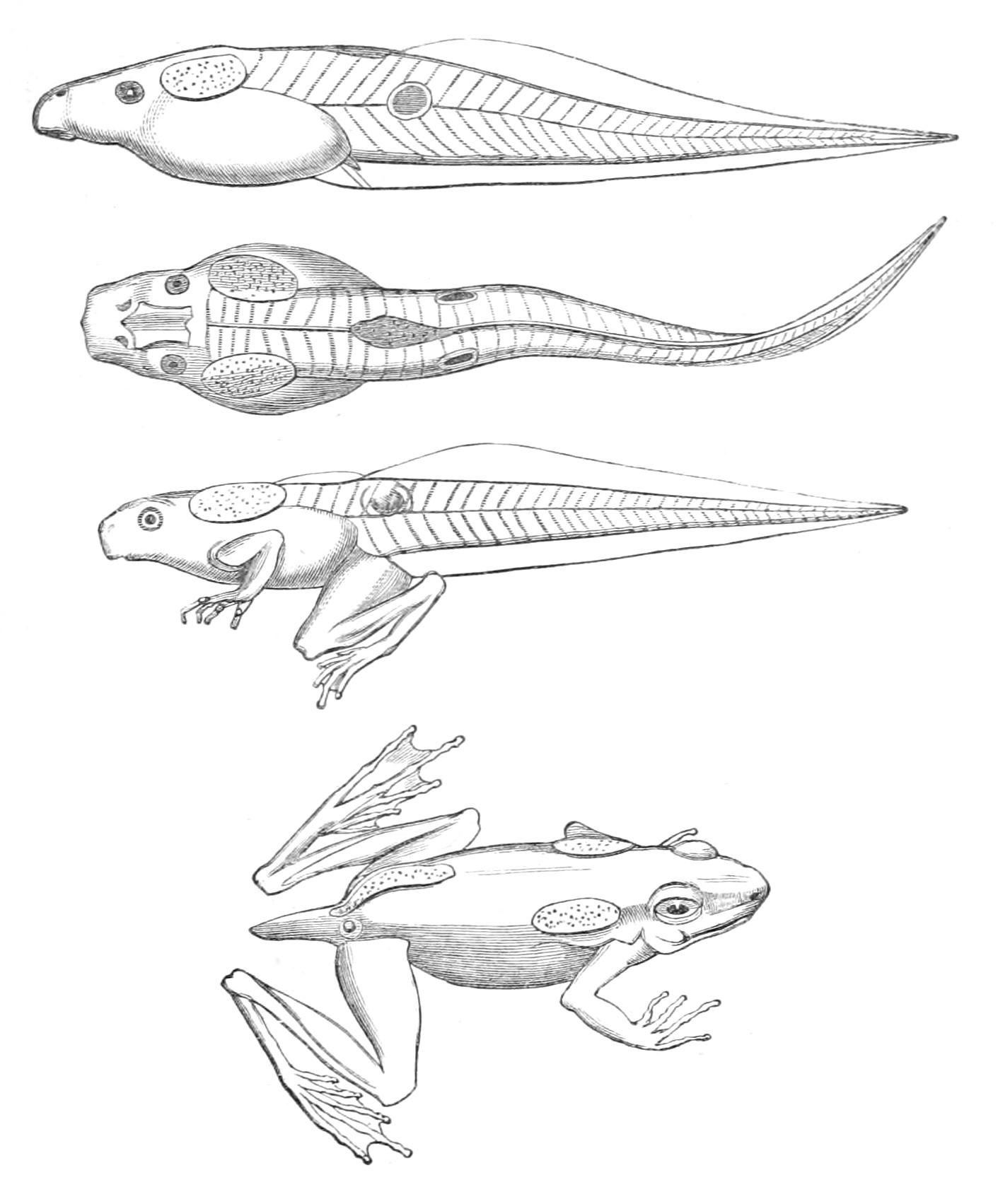
Tadpoles—notice the caudal ocellus—and newly metamorphosed juvenile

The tadpoles of Clinotarsus alticola are distinctive: they are large (up to 98 mm (3.9 in) in length), have many glands, and are black in colouration with red ocelli. The caudal ocellus is a unique feature among ranid tadpoles. Its colouration may be aposematic.
