= Nanorana annandalii =

Conservation status
- Near Threatened (IUCN 3.1)

Scientific classification
- Kingdom: Animalia
- Phylum: Chordata
- Class: Amphibia
- Order: Anura
- Family: Dicroglossidae
- Genus: Nanorana
- Species: N. annandalii

Binomial name
- Nanorana annandalii (Boulenger, 1920)

Synonyms
- Paa annandalii (Boulenger, 1920)

Species of amphibian

Nanorana annandalii (common names: Annandale's paa frog, Annandale's frog, Boulenger's hill frog) is a species of frog in the family Dicroglossidae. It is found in northeastern India (Arunachal Pradesh and West Bengal) and eastern Nepal. Nanorana gammii (Anderson, 1871) was until quite recently (2006) considered a synonym of Nanorana annandalii but is now treated as a separate species; this change confounds older records of Nanorana annandalii. This species lives in rocky streams and brooks in montane forests. It can also be found near pools in forest clearings. It is threatened by habitat loss (deforestation).
